= List of governors of Mississippi =

Governor of Mississippi
- Seal of Mississippi

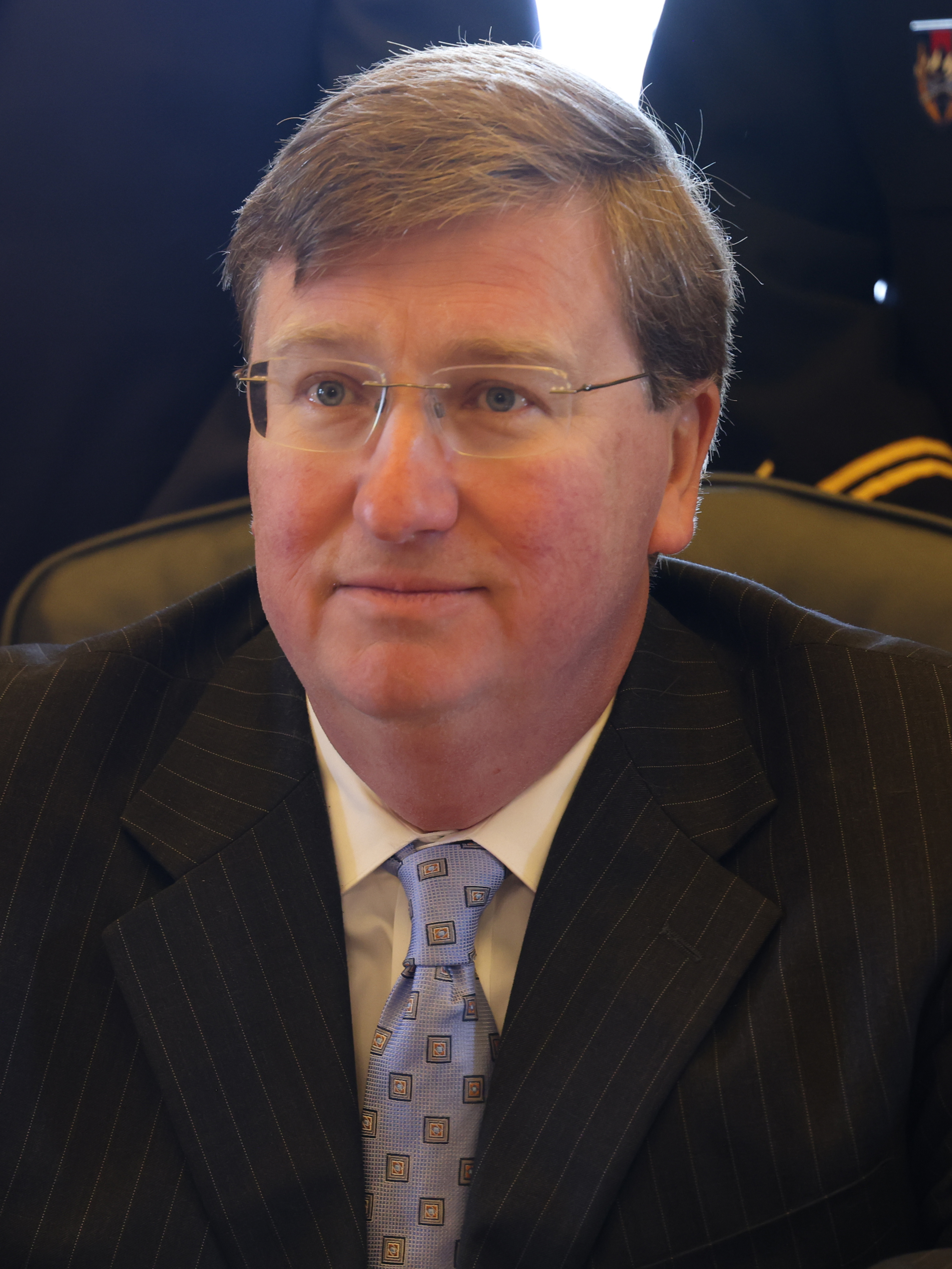
- Incumbent; Tate Reeves since January 14, 2020
- Style: Governor (informal); The Honorable (formal)
- Status: Head of state; Head of government
- Residence: Mississippi Governor's Mansion
- Term length: Four years, renewable once
- Formation: Constitution of Mississippi
- First holder: Winthrop Sargent
- Succession: Line of succession
- Deputy: Lieutenant Governor of Mississippi
- Salary: $122,160
- Website: governor.ms.gov

The governor of Mississippi is the head of government of Mississippi. The Constitution of Mississippi, ratified in 1890, calls for a four-year term for the governor, elected via the two-round system since a 2020 referendum. Prior to this, the governor was elected by an electoral college composed of the districts represented in the Mississippi House of Representatives, with a contingent election held in the House in the event no candidate received a majority of district electors. The term length was originally two years, with no limit on how many terms they could serve. The 1832 constitution limited governors to serving no more than four out of every six years. When terms were lengthened to four years in 1868, this limit was removed. The 1890 constitution forbid governors from succeeding themselves, but a 1986 amendment allows them to succeed themselves once. The office of the lieutenant governor was created in the 1817 constitution, abolished in 1832, and recreated in 1868. When the office of governor becomes vacant for any reason, the lieutenant governor exercises the powers of governor for the remainder of the term. The governor and the lieutenant governor are not officially elected on the same ticket.

The current governor is Republican Tate Reeves, who took office January 14, 2020.

== List of governors ==
=== Mississippi Territory ===
Mississippi Territory was organized on April 7, 1798, from land ceded to the federal government by Georgia. It had four governors appointed by the president of the United States during its 19-year history, including one, David Holmes, who would later serve as state governor.

Governors of the Territory of Mississippi
| No. | Governor | Term in office (Note: The range given is from the date the governor was confirmed by the Senate, or appointed by the President during a Senate recess, to the date the governor's successor was confirmed, unless noted.) | Appointed by |
|---|---|---|---|
| 1 | Winthrop Sargent (1753–1820) | May 7, 1798 (Note: George Mathews was nominated on April 18, 1798, but was withdrawn and Sargent nominated on May 2. He was confirmed by the Senate on May 7, and arrived in the territory on August 6.) – May 25, 1801 (1114 days; replaced) | John Adams |
| 2 | William C. C. Claiborne (d. 1817) | May 25, 1801 (Note: Claiborne was appointed on May 25, 1801, during a Senate recess; nominated on January 6, 1802; and confirmed by the Senate on January 26, 1802. He arrived in the territory on November 23, 1801.) – March 2, 1805 (1378 days; replaced) | Thomas Jefferson |
| 3 | Robert Williams (1770–1836) | March 2, 1805 (Note: Williams was nominated on March 1, 1805; confirmed by the Senate on March 2; and he arrived in the territory in May. He was reconfirmed by the Senate on March 14, 1808.) – March 7, 1809 (1467 days; replaced) | Thomas Jefferson |
| 4 | David Holmes (1769–1832) | March 7, 1809 (Note: Holmes was nominated on March 6, 1809; confirmed by the Senate on March 7; and he arrived in the territory on June 30. He was reconfirmed by the Senate on March 31, 1812, and December 10, 1814.) – October 7, 1817 (3137 days; elected state governor) | James Madison |

=== State of Mississippi ===
Mississippi was admitted to the Union on December 10, 1817. It seceded from the Union on January 9, 1861, and was a founding member of the Confederate States of America on February 4, 1861. During the Reconstruction era following the end of the American Civil War, Mississippi was part of the Fourth Military District, which exerted some control over governor appointments and elections. Mississippi was readmitted to the Union on February 23, 1870.

Governors of the State of Mississippi
| No. | Governor | Term in office | Party | Election | Lt. Governor (Note: The office of lieutenant governor was created in 1817, abolished in 1832, and recreated in 1868.) (Note: Lieutenant governors represented the same party as their governor unless noted.) |
|---|---|---|---|---|---|
| 1 | David Holmes (1769–1832) | October 7, 1817 – January 5, 1820 (821 days; retired) | Democratic- Republican | 1817 | Duncan Stewart |
| 2 | George Poindexter (1779–1853) | January 5, 1820 – January 7, 1822 (734 days; retired) | Democratic- Republican | 1819 | James Patton |
| 3 | Walter Leake (1762–1825) | January 7, 1822 – November 17, 1825 (1411 days; died in office) | Democratic- Republican | 1821 | David C. Dickson |
| 3 | Walter Leake (1762–1825) | January 7, 1822 – November 17, 1825 (1411 days; died in office) | Democratic- Republican | 1823 | Gerard Brandon |
| 4 | Gerard Brandon (1788–1850) | November 17, 1825 – January 7, 1826 (52 days; retired) | Democratic- Republican | Lieutenant governor acting | Acting as governor |
| 5 | David Holmes (1769–1832) | January 7, 1826 – July 25, 1826 (200 days; resigned) (Note: Holmes resigned due to ill health.) | Democratic- Republican | 1825 | Gerard Brandon |
| 6 | Gerard Brandon (1788–1850) | July 25, 1826 – January 9, 1832 (1995 days; retired) | Democratic- Republican | Lieutenant governor acting | Acting as governor |
| 6 | Gerard Brandon (1788–1850) | July 25, 1826 – January 9, 1832 (1995 days; retired) | Democratic- Republican | 1827 | Abram M. Scott (Note: Represented the National Republican Party) |
| 6 | Gerard Brandon (1788–1850) | July 25, 1826 – January 9, 1832 (1995 days; retired) | Democratic- Republican | 1829 | Abram M. Scott |
| 7 | Abram M. Scott (1785–1833) | January 9, 1832 – June 12, 1833 (521 days; died in office) (Note: Scott had already lost reelection when he died.) | National; Republican | 1831 | Fountain Winston (Note: Represented no party) (office abolished October 26, 1832) |
| 7 | Abram M. Scott (1785–1833) | January 9, 1832 – June 12, 1833 (521 days; died in office) | National; Republican | 1831 | Office did not exist |
| 8 | Charles Lynch (1783–1853) | June 12, 1833 – November 21, 1833 (163 days; retired) | Whig (Note: Lynch is labeled a Whig by Kallenbach and a Democratic-Republican by Glashan.) | President of the Senate acting | Office did not exist |
| 9 | Hiram Runnels (1796–1857) | November 21, 1833 (Note: All sources, modern and older, say Runnels took office on November 20; however, contemporary news shows he was inaugurated on November 21.) – November 21, 1835 (731 days; lost election) (Note: The 1832 constitution specified that governor "shall hold his office for two years from the time of his installation;" thus, on November 21, 1835, two years after he took office, Runnels, having lost the 1835 election, left office. However, the legislature had set the start of the next term in January. The Senate met on December 3 and elected a new president, Quitman, who would act as governor until the governor-elect, Lynch, took office.) | Democratic | 1833 | Office did not exist |
| 10 | John A. Quitman (1798–1858) | December 3, 1835 – January 7, 1836 (36 days; retired) | Democratic | President of the Senate acting | Office did not exist |
| 11 | Charles Lynch (1783–1853) | January 7, 1836 – January 8, 1838 (733 days; retired) | Whig | 1835 | Office did not exist |
| 12 | Alexander McNutt (1802–1848) | January 8, 1838 – January 9, 1842 (1463 days; term-limited) (Note: McNutt's term constitutionally could only last two years, so on January 9, he left office and President of the Senate Jesse Speight became acting governor for one day.) (Note: Under the 1832 constitution, governors were ineligible to hold the office for more than four years in any term of six years.) | Democratic | 1837 | Office did not exist |
| 12 | Alexander McNutt (1802–1848) | January 8, 1838 – January 9, 1842 (1463 days; term-limited) | Democratic | 1839 | Office did not exist |
| 13 | Tilghman Tucker (1802–1859) | January 10, 1842 – January 10, 1844 (731 days; retired) (Note: Tucker was instead elected to the United States House of Representatives.) | Democratic | 1841 | Office did not exist |
| 14 | Albert G. Brown (1813–1880) | January 10, 1844 – January 10, 1848 (1462 days; term-limited) (Note: Brown, being term-limited, had already been elected to the United States House of Representatives when his term ended.) | Democratic | 1843 | Office did not exist |
| 14 | Albert G. Brown (1813–1880) | January 10, 1844 – January 10, 1848 (1462 days; term-limited) | Democratic | 1845 | Office did not exist |
| 15 | Joseph W. Matthews (1812–1862) | January 10, 1848 – January 10, 1850 (732 days; retired) | Democratic | 1847 | Office did not exist |
| 16 | John A. Quitman (1798–1858) | January 10, 1850 – February 3, 1851 (390 days; resigned) (Note: Quitman resigned after being arrested for his involvement in the Lopez Expedition; he was later acquitted.) | Democratic | 1849 | Office did not exist |
| 17 | John Isaac Guion (1802–1855) | February 3, 1851 – November 4, 1851 (275 days; new senate seated) (Note: All senate terms ended on November 4; Secretary of State of Mississippi Joseph Bell acted as chief executive until the senate could convene and elect a new president.) | Democratic | President of the Senate acting | Office did not exist |
| 18 | James Whitfield (1791–1875) | November 25, 1851 (Note: All modern sources say Whitfield took office November 24; however, contemporary news reports say the final vote was the next morning.) – January 10, 1852 (47 days; retired) | Democratic | President of the Senate acting | Office did not exist |
| 19 | Henry S. Foote (1804–1880) | January 10, 1852 – January 5, 1854 (727 days; resigned) (Note: Foote resigned due to tensions resolving around secession.) | Union; Democratic | 1851 | Office did not exist |
| 20 | John J. Pettus (1813–1867) | January 5, 1854 – January 10, 1854 (6 days; retired) | Democratic | President of the Senate acting | Office did not exist |
| 21 | John J. McRae (1815–1868) | January 10, 1854 – November 16, 1857 (1407 days; term-limited) | Democratic | 1853 | Office did not exist |
| 21 | John J. McRae (1815–1868) | January 10, 1854 – November 16, 1857 (1407 days; term-limited) | Democratic | 1855 | Office did not exist |
| 22 | William McWillie (1795–1869) | November 16, 1857 – November 21, 1859 (736 days; retired) | Democratic | 1857 | Office did not exist |
| 23 | John J. Pettus (1813–1867) | November 21, 1859 – November 16, 1863 (1457 days; term-limited) | Democratic | 1859 | Office did not exist |
| 23 | John J. Pettus (1813–1867) | November 21, 1859 – November 16, 1863 (1457 days; term-limited) | Democratic | 1861 | Office did not exist |
| 24 | Charles Clark (1811–1877) | November 16, 1863 – May 22, 1865 (554 days; arrested and removed) (Note: Clark was arrested by Union forces.) | Democratic | 1863 | Office did not exist |
| 25 | William L. Sharkey (1798–1873) | June 13, 1865 – October 16, 1865 (126 days; retired) (Note: Humphreys was sworn in on October 16. Sharkey was elected to the Senate on October 19, Humphreys signed his credentials on October 31, and Sharkey presented them to the United States Senate on December 5, though he was refused his seat. However, some reputable sources say Sharkey remained in office until December, when President Andrew Johnson ordered him to turn over power to Humphreys.) | Provisional governor appointed by President | | Office did not exist |
| 26 | Benjamin G. Humphreys (1808–1882) | October 16, 1865 – June 15, 1868 (947 days; removed) (Note: Humphreys was removed by federal forces and replaced with a military governor after his failure to comply with the Reconstruction Acts.) | Non-partisan (Note: The 1865 election was officially non-partisan.) | 1865 | Office did not exist |
| 27 | Adelbert Ames (1835–1933) | June 15, 1868 – March 10, 1870 (634 days; civil government established) (Note: Mississippi was readmitted to Congress on February 23, 1870, and Ames was elected to the United States Senate that same day. He left office upon the inauguration of James Alcorn.) | Provisional governor appointed by military occupation | | Office did not exist |
| 28 | James L. Alcorn (1816–1894) | March 10, 1870 – November 30, 1871 (631 days; resigned) (Note: Alcorn resigned, having been elected to the United States Senate; his senate term had begun on March 4, 1871, but he delayed taking it.) | Republican | 1869 | Ridgley C. Powers |
| 29 | Ridgley C. Powers (1836–1912) | November 30, 1871 – January 22, 1874 (785 days; retired) | Republican | Lieutenant governor acting | Acting as governor |
| 30 | Adelbert Ames (1835–1933) | January 22, 1874 – March 29, 1876 (798 days; resigned) (Note: Ames resigned under threat of impeachment from the newly-elected Democratic legislature.) | Republican | 1873 | Alexander Kelso Davis (impeached and removed) |
| 30 | Adelbert Ames (1835–1933) | January 22, 1874 – March 29, 1876 (798 days; resigned) | Republican | 1873 | Vacant |
| 31 | John Marshall Stone (1830–1900) | March 29, 1876 – January 9, 1882 (2113 days; lost nomination) | Democratic | President of the Senate acting | Vacant |
| 31 | John Marshall Stone (1830–1900) | March 29, 1876 – January 9, 1882 (2113 days; lost nomination) | Democratic | 1877 | William H. Sims |
| 32 | Robert Lowry (1829–1910) | January 9, 1882 – January 13, 1890 (2927 days; retired) | Democratic | 1881 | G. D. Shands |
| 32 | Robert Lowry (1829–1910) | January 9, 1882 – January 13, 1890 (2927 days; retired) | Democratic | 1885 | G. D. Shands |
| 33 | John Marshall Stone (1830–1900) | January 13, 1890 – January 21, 1896 (2200 days; term-limited) (Note: Under the 1890 constitution, governors were ineligible to be their immediate successor.) | Democratic | 1889 | M. M. Evans |
| 34 | Anselm J. McLaurin (1848–1909) | January 21, 1896 – January 16, 1900 (1457 days; term-limited) (Note: McLaurin, being term-limited, was elected to the United States Senate immediately upon the end of his term.) | Democratic | 1895 | J. H. Jones |
| 35 | Andrew H. Longino (1854–1942) | January 16, 1900 – January 19, 1904 (1464 days; term-limited) | Democratic | 1899 | James T. Harrison |
| 36 | James K. Vardaman (1861–1930) | January 19, 1904 – January 21, 1908 (1464 days; term-limited) (Note: Vardaman, being term-limited, had already lost election to the United States Senate when his term ended.) | Democratic | 1903 | John Prentiss Carter |
| 37 | Edmond Noel (1856–1927) | January 21, 1908 – January 16, 1912 (1457 days; term-limited) | Democratic | 1907 | Luther Manship |
| 38 | Earl L. Brewer (1869–1942) | January 16, 1912 – January 18, 1916 (1464 days; term-limited) | Democratic | 1911 | Theodore G. Bilbo |
| 39 | Theodore G. Bilbo (1877–1947) | January 18, 1916 – January 18, 1920 (1462 days; term-limited) | Democratic | 1915 | Lee M. Russell |
| 40 | Lee M. Russell (1875–1943) | January 20, 1920 – January 22, 1924 (1464 days; term-limited) | Democratic | 1919 | Homer Casteel |
| 41 | Henry L. Whitfield (1868–1927) | January 22, 1924 – March 18, 1927 (1152 days; died in office) | Democratic | 1923 | Dennis Murphree |
| 42 | Dennis Murphree (1886–1949) | March 18, 1927 – January 17, 1928 (306 days; lost nomination) | Democratic | Lieutenant governor acting | Acting as governor |
| 43 | Theodore G. Bilbo (1877–1947) | January 17, 1928 – January 19, 1932 (1464 days; term-limited) | Democratic | 1927 | Bidwell Adam |
| 44 | Martin Sennet Conner (1891–1950) | January 19, 1932 – January 21, 1936 (1464 days; term-limited) | Democratic | 1931 | Dennis Murphree |
| 45 | Hugh L. White (1881–1965) | January 21, 1936 – January 16, 1940 (1457 days; term-limited) | Democratic | 1935 | Jacob Buehler Snider |
| 46 | Paul B. Johnson Sr. (1880–1943) | January 16, 1940 – December 26, 1943 (1441 days; died in office) | Democratic | 1939 | Dennis Murphree |
| 47 | Dennis Murphree (1886–1949) | December 26, 1943 – January 18, 1944 (24 days; retired) (Note: Murphree had already lost the Democratic nomination for governor when he succeeded Johnson.) | Democratic | Lieutenant governor acting | Acting as governor |
| 48 | Thomas L. Bailey (1888–1946) | January 18, 1944 – November 2, 1946 (1020 days; died in office) | Democratic | 1943 | Fielding L. Wright |
| 49 | Fielding L. Wright (Note: Mississippi numbers Wright as both the 49th governor (completing his predecessor's term) and the 50th governor (his own elected term).) (1895–1956) | November 2, 1946 – January 22, 1952 (1908 days; term-limited) | Democratic | Lieutenant governor acting | Acting as governor |
| 50 | Fielding L. Wright (1895–1956) | November 2, 1946 – January 22, 1952 (1908 days; term-limited) | Democratic | 1947 | Sam Lumpkin |
| 51 | Hugh L. White (1881–1965) | January 22, 1952 – January 17, 1956 (1457 days; term-limited) | Democratic | 1951 | Carroll Gartin |
| 52 | James P. Coleman (1914–1991) | January 17, 1956 – January 19, 1960 (1464 days; term-limited) | Democratic | 1955 | Carroll Gartin |
| 53 | Ross Barnett (1898–1987) | January 19, 1960 – January 21, 1964 (1464 days; term-limited) | Democratic | 1959 | Paul B. Johnson Jr. |
| 54 | Paul B. Johnson Jr. (1916–1985) | January 21, 1964 – January 16, 1968 (1457 days; term-limited) (Note: Johnson, being term-limited, had already lost election as Lieutenant Governor of Mississippi when his term ended.) | Democratic | 1963 | Carroll Gartin (died December 19, 1966) |
| 54 | Paul B. Johnson Jr. (1916–1985) | January 21, 1964 – January 16, 1968 (1457 days; term-limited) | Democratic | 1963 | Vacant |
| 55 | John Bell Williams (1918–1983) | January 16, 1968 – January 18, 1972 (1464 days; term-limited) | Democratic | 1967 | Charles L. Sullivan |
| 56 | Bill Waller (1926–2011) | January 18, 1972 – January 20, 1976 (1464 days; term-limited) | Democratic | 1971 | William F. Winter |
| 57 | Cliff Finch (1927–1986) | January 20, 1976 – January 22, 1980 (1464 days; term-limited) | Democratic | 1975 | Evelyn Gandy |
| 58 | William F. Winter (1923–2020) | January 22, 1980 – January 10, 1984 (1450 days; term-limited) | Democratic | 1979 | Brad Dye |
| 59 | William Allain (1928–2013) | January 10, 1984 – January 12, 1988 (1464 days; retired) | Democratic | 1983 | Brad Dye |
| 60 | Ray Mabus (b. 1948) | January 12, 1988 – January 14, 1992 (1464 days; lost election) | Democratic | 1987 | Brad Dye |
| 61 | Kirk Fordice (1934–2004) | January 14, 1992 – January 11, 2000 (2920 days; term-limited) (Note: Under a 1986 amendment to the constitution, governors are ineligible to be elected more than twice.) | Republican | 1991 | Eddie Briggs |
| 61 | Kirk Fordice (1934–2004) | January 14, 1992 – January 11, 2000 (2920 days; term-limited) | Republican | 1995 | Ronnie Musgrove |
| 62 | Ronnie Musgrove (b. 1956) | January 11, 2000 – January 13, 2004 (1464 days; lost election) | Democratic | 1999 | Amy Tuck (Note: Tuck switched her party membership to the Republican Party in 2002.) |
| 63 | Haley Barbour (b. 1947) | January 13, 2004 – January 10, 2012 (2920 days; term-limited) | Republican | 2003 | Amy Tuck |
| 63 | Haley Barbour (b. 1947) | January 13, 2004 – January 10, 2012 (2920 days; term-limited) | Republican | 2007 | Phil Bryant |
| 64 | Phil Bryant (b. 1954) | January 10, 2012 – January 14, 2020 (2927 days; term-limited) | Republican | 2011 | Tate Reeves |
| 64 | Phil Bryant (b. 1954) | January 10, 2012 – January 14, 2020 (2927 days; term-limited) | Republican | 2015 | Tate Reeves |
| 65 | Tate Reeves (b. 1974) | January 14, 2020 – Incumbent (Note: Reeves' second term began on January 9, 2024, and will expire on January 11, 2028; he will be term-limited.) (in office 2505 days) | Republican | 2019 | Delbert Hosemann |
| 65 | Tate Reeves (b. 1974) | January 14, 2020 – Incumbent (in office 2505 days) | Republican | 2023 | Delbert Hosemann |

== Electoral history (1903–) ==
| Year | Democratic nominee | | | Republican nominee | | | Other candidate | | | Other candidate | | | Other candidate | | |
| Year | Candidate | # | % | Candidate | # | % | Candidate | # | % | Candidate | # | % | Candidate | # | % |
|---|---|---|---|---|---|---|---|---|---|---|---|---|---|---|---|
| 1903 | James K. Vardaman | 32,191 | 100.00% | – | | | – | | | – | | | – | | |
| 1907 | Edmond Noel | 29,528 | 100.00% | – | | | – | | | – | | | – | | |
| 1911 | Earl L. Brewer | 40,471 | 95.18% | – | | | Summer Rose (Socialist) | 2,049 | 4.82% | – | | | – | | |
| 1915 | Theodore G. Bilbo | 50,541 | 92.59% | – | | | J. T. Lester (Socialist) | 4,046 | 7.41% | – | | | – | | |
| 1919 | Lee M. Russell | 39,241 | 96.96% | – | | | J. T. Lester (Socialist) | 1,231 | 3.04% | – | | | – | | |
| 1923 | Henry L. Whitfield | 29,138 | 100.00% | – | | | – | | | – | | | – | | |
| 1927 | Theodore G. Bilbo | 31,717 | 100.00% | – | | | – | | | – | | | – | | |
| 1931 | Martin S. Conner | 45,942 | 100.00% | – | | | – | | | – | | | – | | |
| 1935 | Hugh L. White | 45,881 | 100.00% | – | | | – | | | – | | | – | | |
| 1939 | Paul B. Johnson Sr. | 61,614 | 100.00% | – | | | – | | | – | | | – | | |
| 1943 | Thomas L. Bailey | 50,488 | 100.00% | – | | | – | | | – | | | – | | |
| 1947 | Fielding L. Wright | 166,095 | 97.59% | George L. Sheldon | 4,102 | 2.41% | – | | | – | | | – | | |
| 1951 | Hugh L. White | 43,422 | 100.00% | – | | | – | | | – | | | – | | |
| 1955 | James P. Coleman | 40,707 | 100.00% | – | | | – | | | – | | | – | | |
| 1959 | Ross Barnett | 57,671 | 100.00% | – | | | – | | | – | | | – | | |
| 1963 | Paul B. Johnson Jr. | 225,456 | 61.94% | Rubel Phillips | 138,515 | 38.06% | – | | | – | | | – | | |
| 1967 | John Bell Williams | 315,318 | 70.27% | Rubel Phillips | 133,379 | 29.73% | – | | | – | | | – | | |
| 1971 | Bill Waller | 601,222 | 77.02% | – | | | Charles Evers (Independent) | 172,762 | 22.13% | Thomas P. Brady (Independent) | 6,653 | 0.85% | – | | |
| 1975 | Cliff Finch | 369,568 | 52.19% | Gil Carmichael | 319,632 | 45.15% | Henry Kirksey (Independent) | 18,883 | 2.67% | – | | | – | | |
| 1979 | William Winter | 413,620 | 61.07% | Gil Carmichael | 263,702 | 38.93% | – | | | – | | | – | | |
| 1983 | William Allain | 409,209 | 55.10% | Leon Bramlett | 288,764 | 38.88% | Charles Evers (Independent) | 30,493 | 4.12% | Billie H. Taylor (Independent) | 7,869 | 1.06% | Henry M. Williams (Independent) | 6,302 | 0.85% |
| 1987 | Ray Mabus | 385,689 | 53.44% | Jack Reed | 336,006 | 46.56% | – | | | – | | | – | | |
| 1991 | Ray Mabus | 338,459 | 47.59% | Kirk Fordice | 361,500 | 50.83% | Shawn O'Hara (Independent) | 11,253 | 1.58% | – | | | – | | |
| 1995 | Dick Molpus | 364,210 | 44.44% | Kirk Fordice | 455,261 | 55.56% | – | | | – | | | – | | |
| 1999 | Ronnie Musgrove | 379,033 | 49.62% | Mike Parker | 370,691 | 48.52% | Jerry Ladner (Reform) | 8,208 | 1.07% | Helen Perkins (Independent) | 6,005 | 0.79% | – | | |
| 2003 | Ronnie Musgrove | 409,787 | 45.81% | Haley Barbour | 470,404 | 52.59% | John Cripps (Constitution) | 6,317 | 0.71% | Shawn O'Hara (Reform) | 4,070 | 0.46% | Sherman L. Dillon (Green) | 3,909 | 0.44% |
| 2007 | John A. Eaves | 313,232 | 42.10% | Haley Barbour | 430,807 | 57.90% | – | | | – | | | – | | |
| 2011 | Johnny DuPree | 348,617 | 39.02% | Phil Bryant | 544,851 | 60.98% | – | | | – | | | – | | |
| 2015 | Robert Gray | 234,858 | 32.38% | Phil Bryant | 480,399 | 66.24% | Shawn O'Hara (Reform) | 9,950 | 1.37% | – | | | – | | |
| 2019 | Jim Hood | 414,368 | 46.83% | Tate Reeves | 459,396 | 51.91% | David Singletary (Independent) | 8,522 | 0.96% | Bob Hickingbottom (Constitution) | 2,625 | 0.30% | – | | |
| 2023 | Brandon Presley | 391,614 | 47.70% | Tate Reeves | 418,233 | 50.94% | Gwendolyn Gray (Independent) | 11,153 | 1.36% | – | | | – | | |

== See also ==
- Gubernatorial lines of succession in the United States § Mississippi
- List of first ladies of Mississippi
- Lieutenant Governor of Mississippi
- List of Mississippi state legislatures

== Sources ==
- "Former Mississippi Governors". National Governors Association.
- "Mississippi Constitution". State Democracy Research Initiative. University of Wisconsin Law School.
- Dubin, Michael J. (2003). United States Gubernatorial Elections, 1776–1860: The Official Results by State and County. McFarland. ISBN 0-7864-1439-1 – via Internet Archive.
- Glashan, Roy R. (1979). American Governors and Gubernatorial Elections, 1775-1978. Meckler Books. ISBN 0-7201-1511-6 – via Internet Archive.
- Kallenbach, Joseph E.; Kallenbach, Jessamine S. (1977). American State Governors, 1776-1976. Oceana Publications. ISBN 978-0-379-00665-0 – via Internet Archive.
- McMullin, Thomas A.; Walker, David (1984). Biographical Directory of American Territorial Governors. Meckler Publishing. ISBN 0-930466-11-X – via Internet Archive.
- Mullaney, Marie Marmo (1994). Biographical Directory of the Governors of the United States, 1988–1994. Greenwood Publishing Group. ISBN 0-313-28312-5 – via Internet Archive.
- Sobel, Robert; Raimo, John (1978). Biographical Directory of the Governors of the United States, 1789-1978. Vol. 2. Meckler Books. ISBN 0-930466-01-2 – via Internet Archive.
- Thorpe, Francis Newton, ed. (1909). The Federal and State Constitutions, Colonial Charters, and Other Organic Laws of the States, Territories, and Colonies Now or Heretofore Forming the United States of America. Vol. 4. United States Government Publishing Office – via Internet Archive.
