= Governor Runnels =

Governor Runnels may refer to:

- Hardin Richard Runnels (1820–1873), 6th Governor of Texas
- Hiram Runnels (1796—1857), 9th Governor of Mississippi
