= Abram M. Scott =

American politician (1785–1833)

Abram Marshall Scott
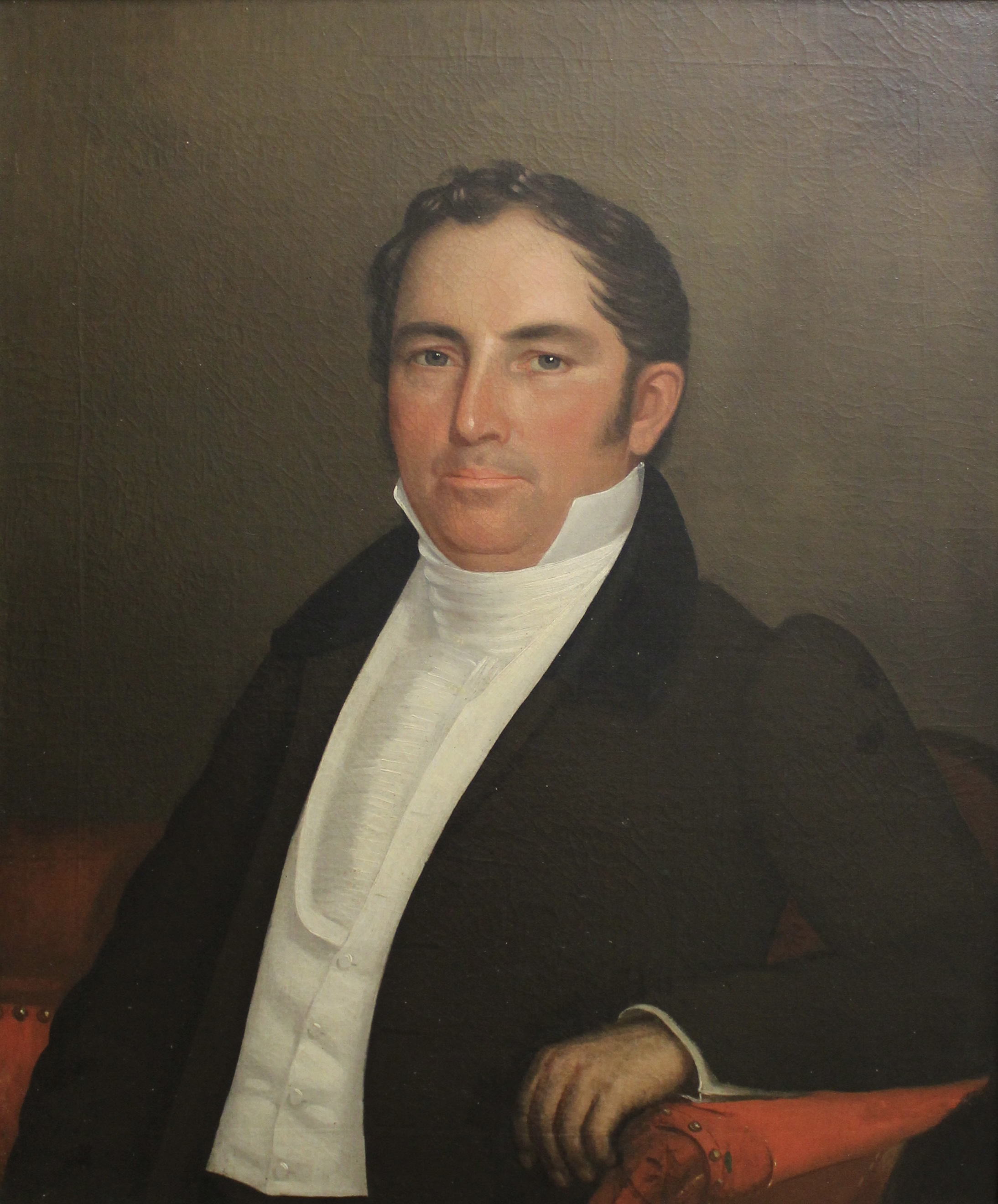

7th Governor of Mississippi
- In office January 9, 1832 – June 12, 1833
- Lieutenant: Fountain Winston (1832); Office abolished (1832–1833)
- Preceded by: Gerard Brandon
- Succeeded by: Charles Lynch

5th Lieutenant Governor of Mississippi
- In office January 1828 – January 9, 1832
- Governor: Gerard Brandon
- Preceded by: Gerard Brandon
- Succeeded by: Fountain Winston

Member of the Mississippi State Senate
- In office 1822
- In office 1826–1827

Personal details
- Born: March 13, 1785 Edgefield County, South Carolina
- Died: June 12, 1833 (aged 48) Jackson, Mississippi, U.S.

Abram Marshall Scott (March 13, 1785 – June 12, 1833) was a politician in Mississippi. He was born in Edgefield County in the Province of South Carolina. He was an early settler of Wilkinson County, Mississippi and was instrumental in founding the town of Woodville, Mississippi. He held local political offices before his election to the Mississippi State Senate. As President of the Mississippi Senate he also served as Lieutenant Governor of Mississippi. He belonged to the National Republican Party.

== Early life ==
Abram Marshall Scott was born in 1785 in Edgefield County, South Carolina. He migrated to Wilkinson County, Mississippi early in his life, where he would serve as a tax collector. During the War of 1812, Scott served as a lieutenant in the 1st Mississippi Regiment of Volunteers.

== Political career ==
Scott served as a delegate during Mississippi's Constitutional Convention of 1817, before serving in the state senate in 1822 and 1826–1827. In 1828, Scott was sworn in as Lieutenant Governor of Mississippi, and in 1832, he was sworn in as the seventh Governor of Mississippi, having defeated Hiram Runnels in the general election of August 1831.

During Scott's administration, the State of South Carolina attempted to nullify a tariff passed by the United States Congress, leading to the Nullification Crisis, in which South Carolina's government threatened to secede from the United States. Like other southern states, Mississippi did not support South Carolina's actions, defusing the crisis.

In 1832, Mississippi ratified a new constitution, which led to a special election for public officials under the new constitution in May 1833. Scott was defeated by Hiram Runnels in this election, but due to disputes over the legality of the special election, Scott was permitted to remain in office. He served until he died on June 12, 1833, due to a cholera epidemic in Jackson, and was succeeded by Charles Lynch.

He is buried in Greenwood Cemetery in Jackson, Mississippi. Scott County, Mississippi is named in his honor.

Party political offices
Preceded by George W. Winchester	National Republican nominee for Governor of Mississippi; 1831	Succeeded by None
First	Whig nominee for Governor of Mississippi; 1833	Succeeded by Charles Lynch
Political offices
Preceded by Gerard C. Brandon	Lieutenant Governor of Mississippi; 1828–1832	Succeeded by Fountain Winston
Preceded by Gerard Brandon	Governor of Mississippi; 1832–1833	Succeeded by Charles Lynch
