= Governor Lynch =

Governor Lynch may refer to:

- Charles Lynch (politician) (1783–1853), 8th and 11th Governor of Mississippi
- John Lynch (New Hampshire governor) (born 1952), 80th Governor of New Hampshire
- James Rolph (1869–1934), 27th Governor of California, nicknamed Governor Lynch
