= Governor McNutt =

Governor McNutt may refer to:

- Alexander McNutt (governor) (1802–1848), 12th Governor of Mississippi
- Paul V. McNutt (1891–1955), 34th Governor of Indiana
