= Senator Winston =

Senator Winston may refer to:

- Fountain Winston (1793–1834), Mississippi State Senate
- Francis D. Winston (1857–1941), North Carolina State Senate
