= 1833 Mississippi gubernatorial election =

- May 6, 1833
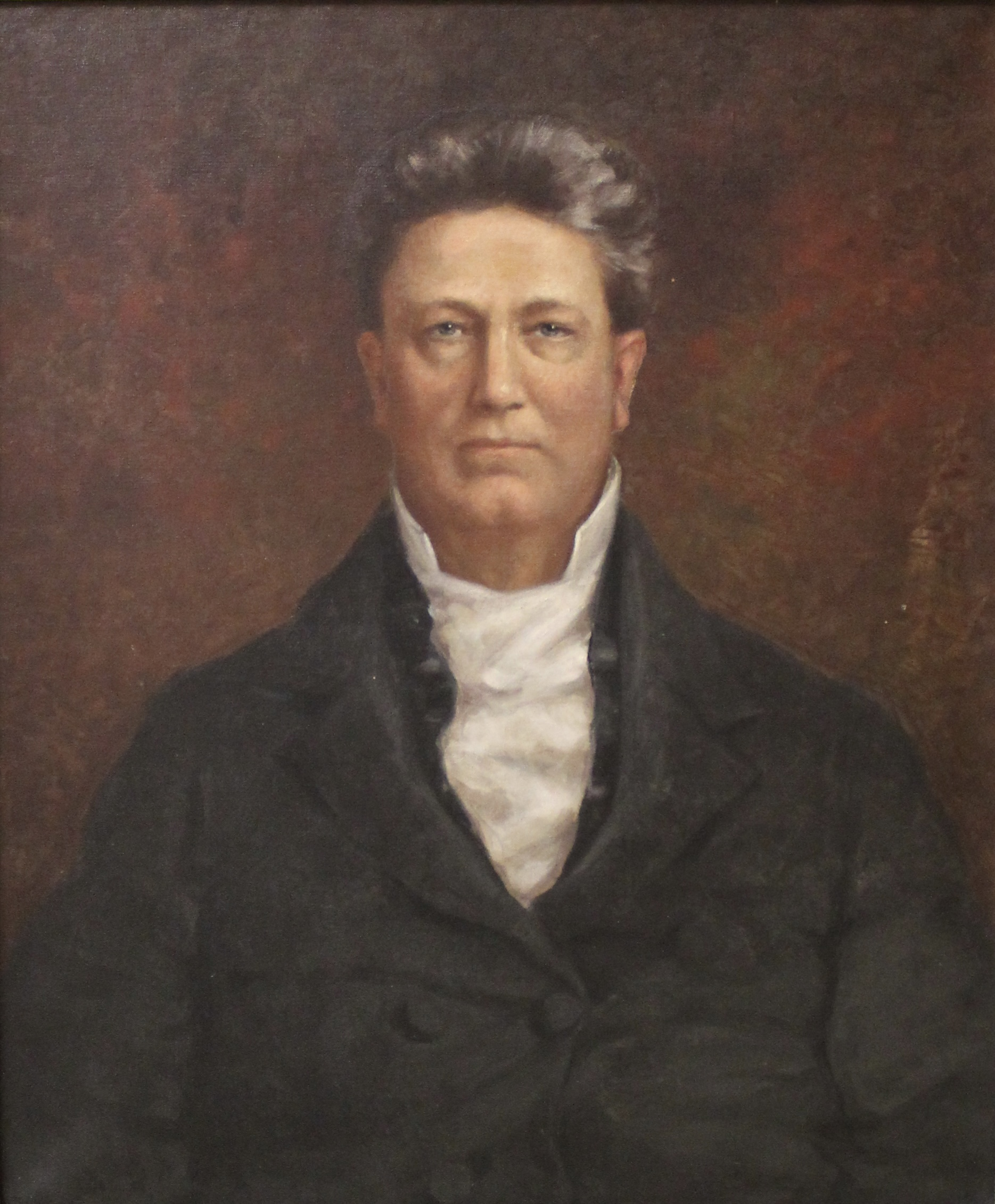

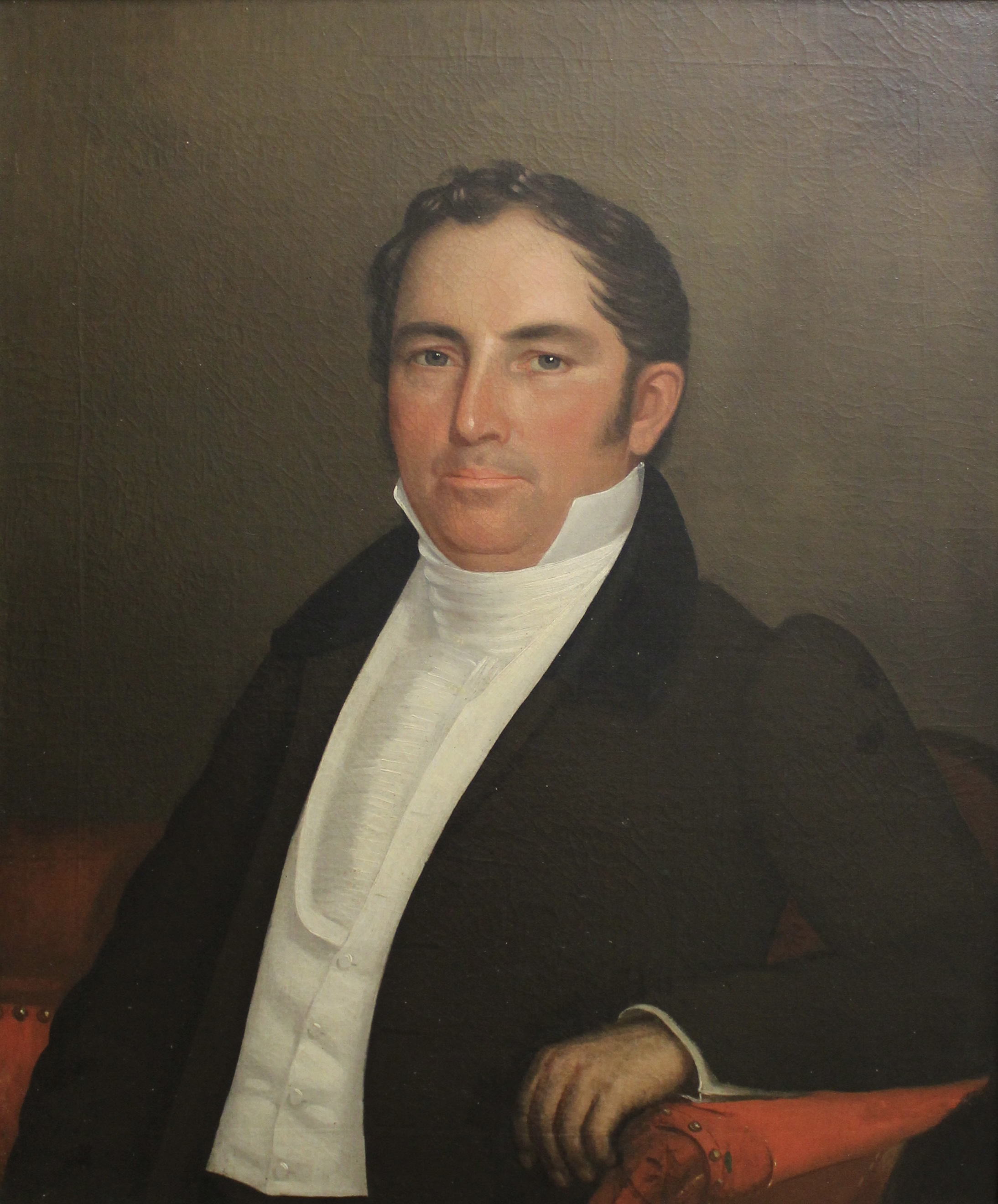
Nominee	Hiram Runnels	Abram M. Scott
Party	Democratic	National Republican
Popular vote	6,705	6,117
Percentage	52.29%	47.71%
- County results Runnels: 50–60% 60–70% 70–80% 80–90% >90% Scott: 50–60% 60–70% 70–80% 80–90% No returns
Governor before election
Abram M. Scott
National Republican
Elected Governor
Hiram Runnels (Note: Scott died between the election and Runnels's inauguration and was briefly succeeded by Charles Lynch.)
Democratic

The 1833 Mississippi gubernatorial election was held on May 6, 1833, to elect the governor of Mississippi. Hiram Runnels, a Democrat, defeated incumbent Governor Abram Scott, a National Republican. (Note: Glashan 1979 labels Scott as both an Independent Republican or National Republican, whereas John Raimo and Robert Sobel 1978 label him a National Republican.)

== Background ==
With the passing of the Mississippi Constitution of 1832, the legislature scheduled elections for May instead of November, the typical month for elections prior. This was done to facilitate the transtition from the old constitution to the new one.

== Results ==
Despite Runnels winning the election in May, he was not inaugurated until November because of confusion of when his term began. During this confusion, Governor Scott died in June from cholera, resulting in Charles Lynch, the senate president, assuming office. Once the legislature met in a special session in November, Runnels was inaugurated and assumed office. Constitutionally, Runnels was supposed to take office in January 1834, causing an irregularity at the end of his two-year term.

Mississippi gubernatorial election, 1833
Party	Candidate	Votes	%
Democratic	Hiram Runnels	6,705	52.29%
National Republican	Abram M. Scott (incumbent)	6,117	47.71%
Total votes		12,822	100.00
Democratic gain from National Republican			
