= John A. Quitman =

American politician (1798–1858)

John Quitman
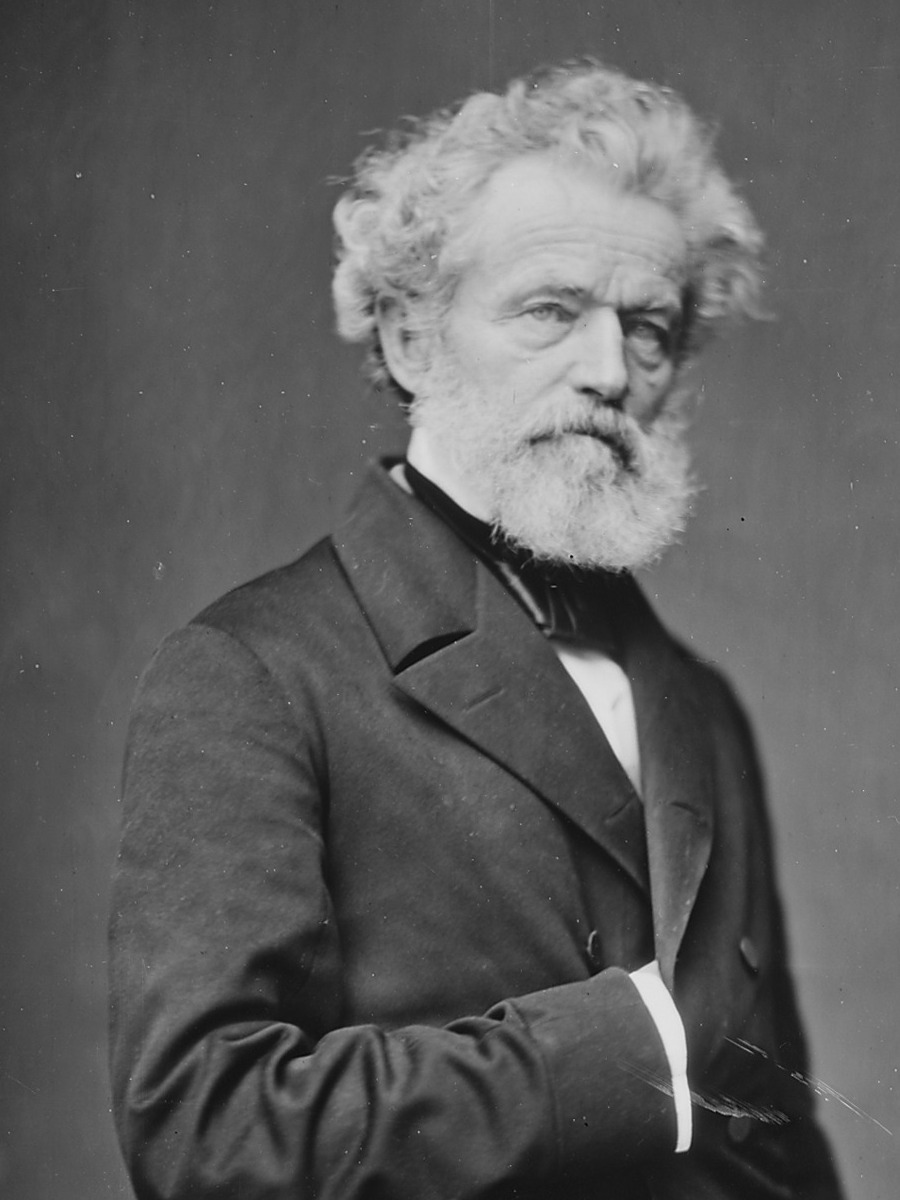
- Photograph by Mathew Brady

Member of the U.S. House of Representatives from Mississippi's 5th district
- In office March 4, 1855 – July 17, 1858
- Preceded by: Constituency established
- Succeeded by: John McRae

10th and 16th Governor of Mississippi
- In office January 10, 1850 – February 3, 1851
- Preceded by: Joseph W. Matthews
- Succeeded by: John Guion
- In office December 3, 1835 – January 7, 1836; Acting
- Preceded by: Hiram Runnels
- Succeeded by: Charles Lynch

Personal details
- Born: September 1, 1798 Rhinebeck, New York, U.S.
- Died: July 17, 1858 (aged 59) Natchez, Mississippi, U.S.
- Resting place: Natchez City Cemetery
- Party: Whig (before 1848); Democratic (1848–1852 and 1852-1858); Southern Rights (1852)
- Spouse: Eliza Turner
- Education: Hartwick College (BA)

Military service
- Allegiance: United States
- Branch/service: United States Army
- Years of service: 1846–1848
- Rank: Major General
- Unit: United States Volunteers
- Commands: 2nd Brigade, 1st Volunteer Division; 4th Volunteer Division; Military Governor of Mexico City
- Battles/wars: Texas Revolution; Mexican–American War; Battle of Monterrey; Siege of Veracruz; Battle of Contreras; Battle of Churubusco; Battle of Chapultepec; Battle for Mexico City

John Anthony Quitman (September 1, 1798 – July 17, 1858) was an American lawyer, politician, and soldier. As president of the Mississippi Senate, he was the acting governor of Mississippi for one month (from December 3, 1835 to January 7, 1836) as a Whig. He was elected governor in 1849 as a Democrat, and served from January 10, 1850, until his resignation on February 3, 1851, shortly after his arrest for violating U.S. neutrality laws. He was strongly pro-slavery and a leading Fire-Eater.

According to Quitman's first biographer, John F. H. Claiborne, writing in 1860, "A more ambitious man never lived. ...He was greedy for military fame." "For Quitman, military glory and political ambition had priority over management of his three plantations and numerous slaves."

== Early life ==
Born at Rhinebeck, New York, in 1798, Quitman studied classics at Hartwick Seminary, graduating in 1816. He was an instructor at Mount Airy College, Pennsylvania, but decided to study law. Quitman's family was of Dutch descent.

He was admitted to the bar in 1820 and moved to Chillicothe, Ohio. He moved south to Natchez, Mississippi, the following year. He purchased Monmouth in 1826, and it would remain in his family for the next 100 years. It was an archaeological dig site investigated by Dr. Montroville Dickeson during his 10-year study of the Natchez Indians of the Mississippi River Valley.

== Mississippi and Louisiana ==
Quitman owned four plantations: Springfield, which he purchased in 1834, on the Mississippi River near Natchez, a cotton plantation and dairy farm; Palmyra (Warren County, Mississippi), which he acquired through marriage (cotton); Live Oaks (Terrebonne Parish, Louisiana, sugar and molasses); and Belen (Holmes County, Mississippi, cotton).

He did not personally manage the plantations, a task entrusted to overseers. Not counting house servants, at Palmyra, there were 311 people under sixty years of age in 1848; at Live Oaks, 85 in 1850; at Springfield, 39 in 1842; and at Belen, 32 in 1858.

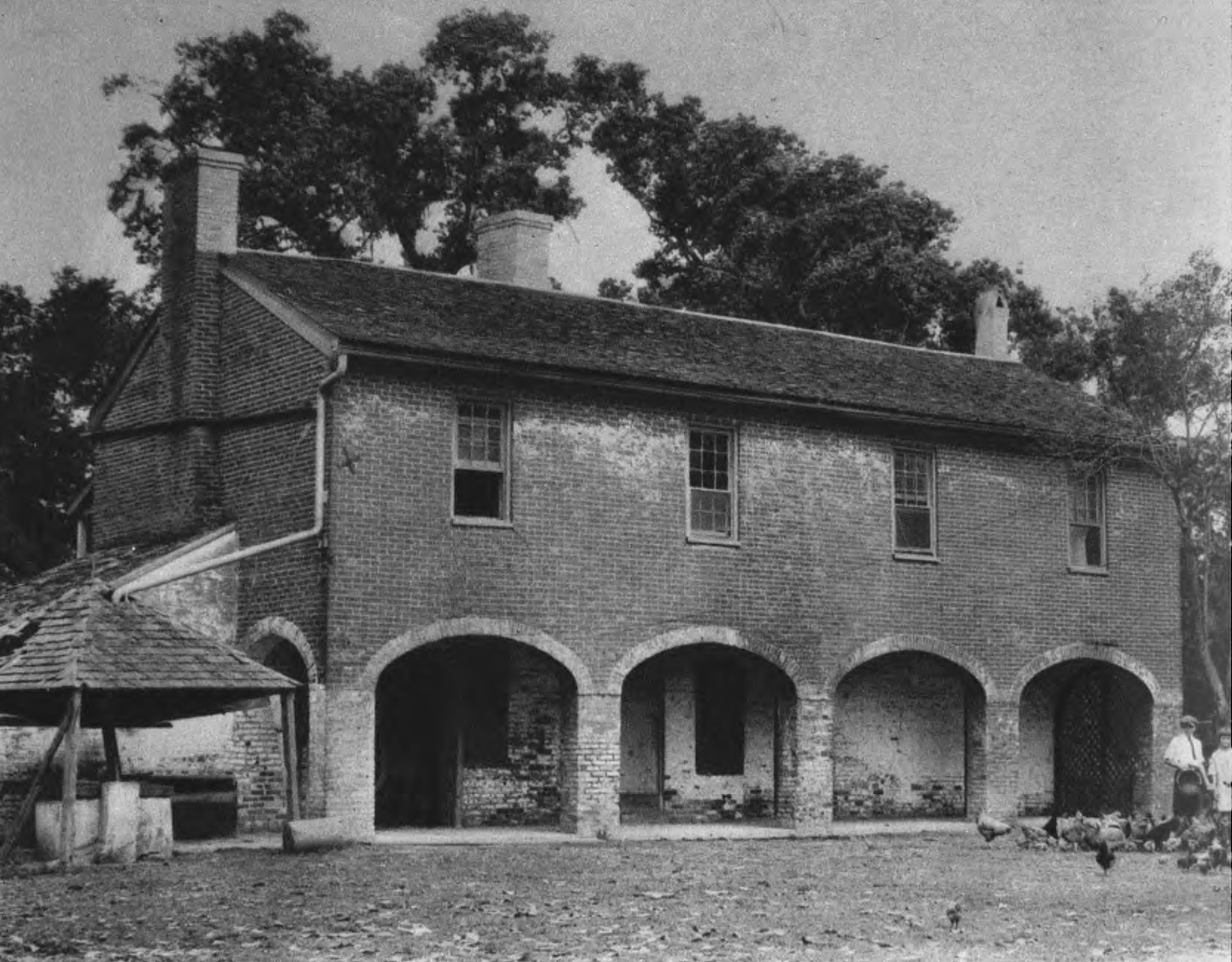
Milk house and servants' house at Monmouth, Natchez, Mississippi

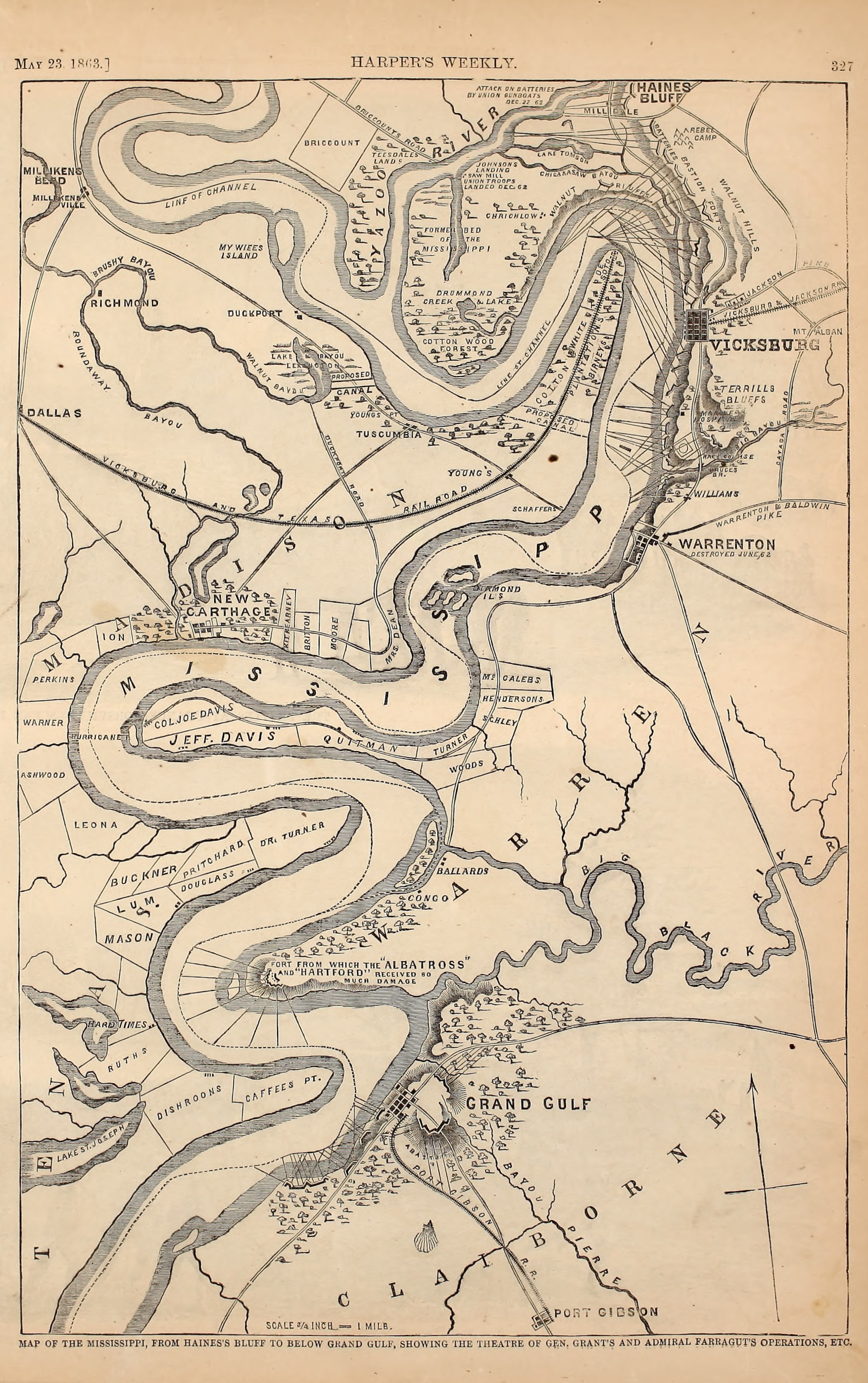
Quitman's Palmyra plantation is pictured on this 1863 map of the Vicksburg area

== Politics ==
In 1823 Quitman was the brigade inspector for the local militia and in the next year organized a volunteer militia company called the Natchez Fencibles. Quitman practiced law in Natchez until 1826 when he was elected to the Mississippi House of Representatives. He became Chancellor of the state in 1828 and served on the state's Constitutional Convention in 1832. He was the protégé of John C. Calhoun during the Nullification Crisis.

In 1835, he was elected to the Mississippi Senate, then elected president of the Mississippi State Senate. He was an acting governor of Mississippi. In 1838, he became a judge on the High Court of Errors and Appeal. Quitman was the grand master of the Grand Lodge of Mississippi from 1826 to 1838, in 1840, and 1845 to 1846. A masonic lodge and council were named after Quitman.

He was initiated to the Scottish Rite Masonry till his elevation to the 33rd and highest degree.

== Mexican–American War ==
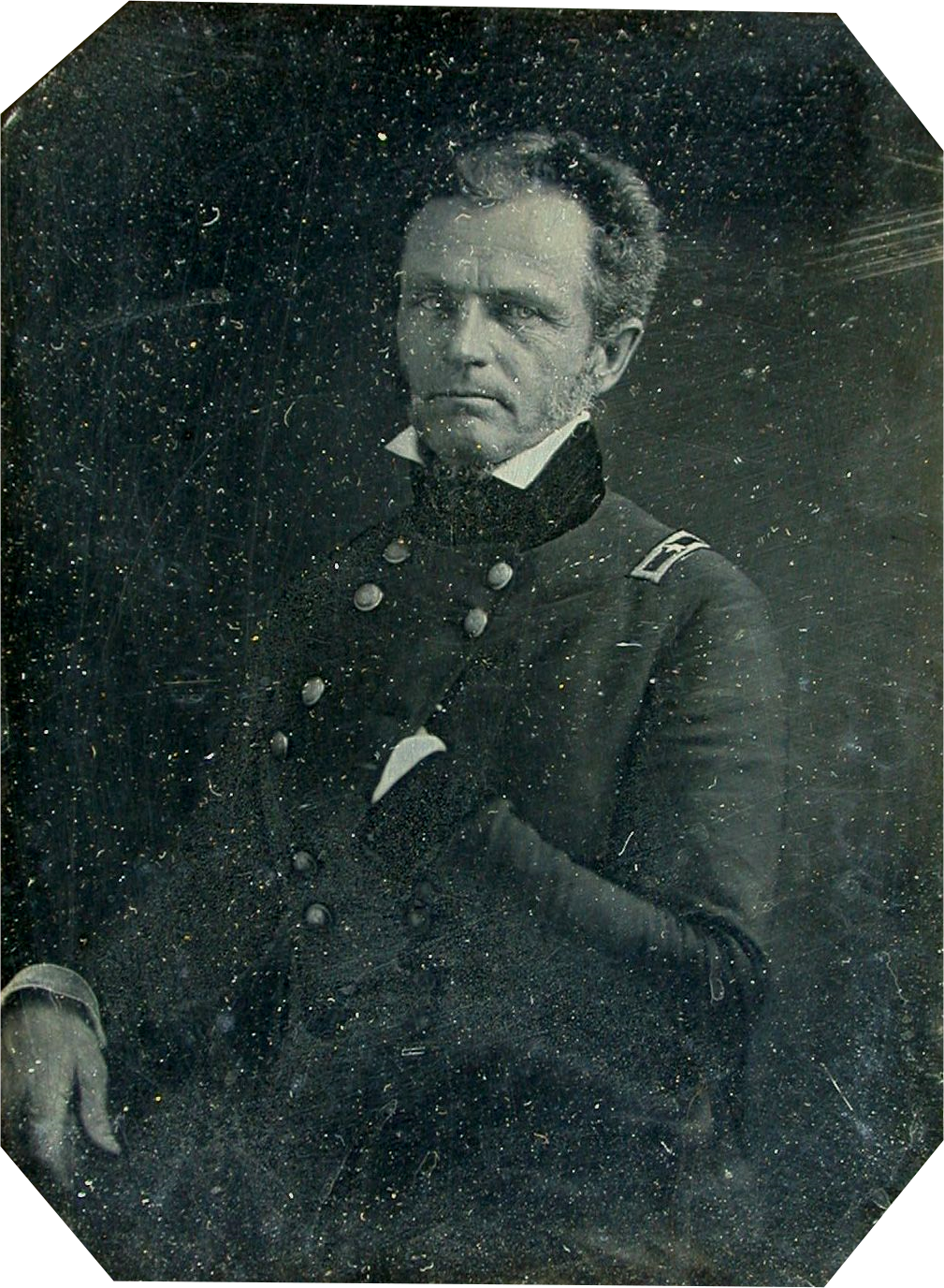
Quitman circa 1846.

The Natchez Fencibles were not selected to fight in the Mexican War due to a handful of men who failed to muster at Vicksburg, Mississippi, at the proper time. However on July 1, 1846, during the Mexican–American War, Quitman was made a Brigadier General of Volunteers. He commanded a brigade under Zachary Taylor in northern Mexico.

After the Battle of Monterrey, he was sent to join Winfield Scott's expedition. He led the 2nd Brigade in the Volunteer Division during the Siege of Veracruz, and on April 14, 1847, he was promoted to major general in the Regular Army.

Following the Battle of Cerro Gordo, General Robert Patterson returned to the United States with other Volunteer soldiers whose enlistments had expired. Reinforcements from Veracruz, including about 300 U. S. Marines, were organized into a new brigade under Samuel E. Watson. Watson's and James Shields' brigades were designated the 4th Division, with Quitman in overall command.

By this point, Quitman had gained a reputation as a competent military commander and enjoyed affectionate respect from volunteer and professional soldiers alike.

Quitman led his division to the Valley of Mexico, where he was posted to guard the supply depot, hospital, and horse teams. Frustrated at his supporting role, Quitman was nevertheless ordered to send reinforcements to the front. At the battles of Contreras and Churubusco, Shields' brigade was actively engaged, though Quitman was not personally involved.

He commanded the southern assault during the battle of Chapultepec. U.S. Marines of Quitman's division spearheaded the attack, and their involvement in this battle is remembered in the opening line of the Marines' Hymn. Quitman received the surrender of the citadel in Mexico City.

After the fall of Mexico City, General Scott named Quitman as the military governor of Mexico City for the remainder of the occupation. He was the only American to rule from within the National Palace of Mexico. Quitman was a founding member of the Aztec Club of 1847. He was discharged on July 20, 1848, and served as governor of Mississippi in 1850 and 1851.

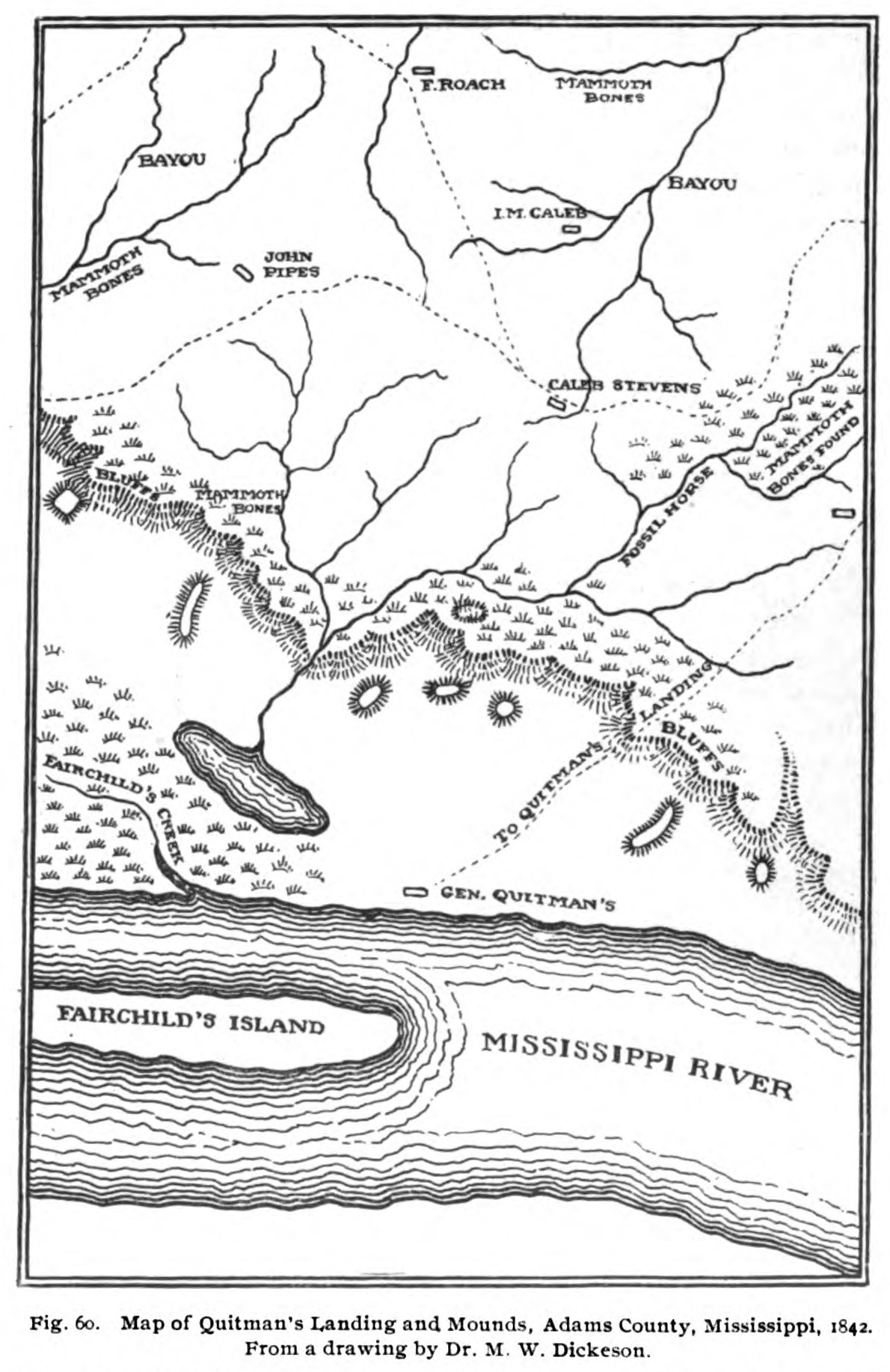
In the 1840s, Quitman permitted archeologist-antiquarian Montroville Wilson Dickeson to excavate ancient mounds located on his property; Dickeson drew this location map indicating key finds

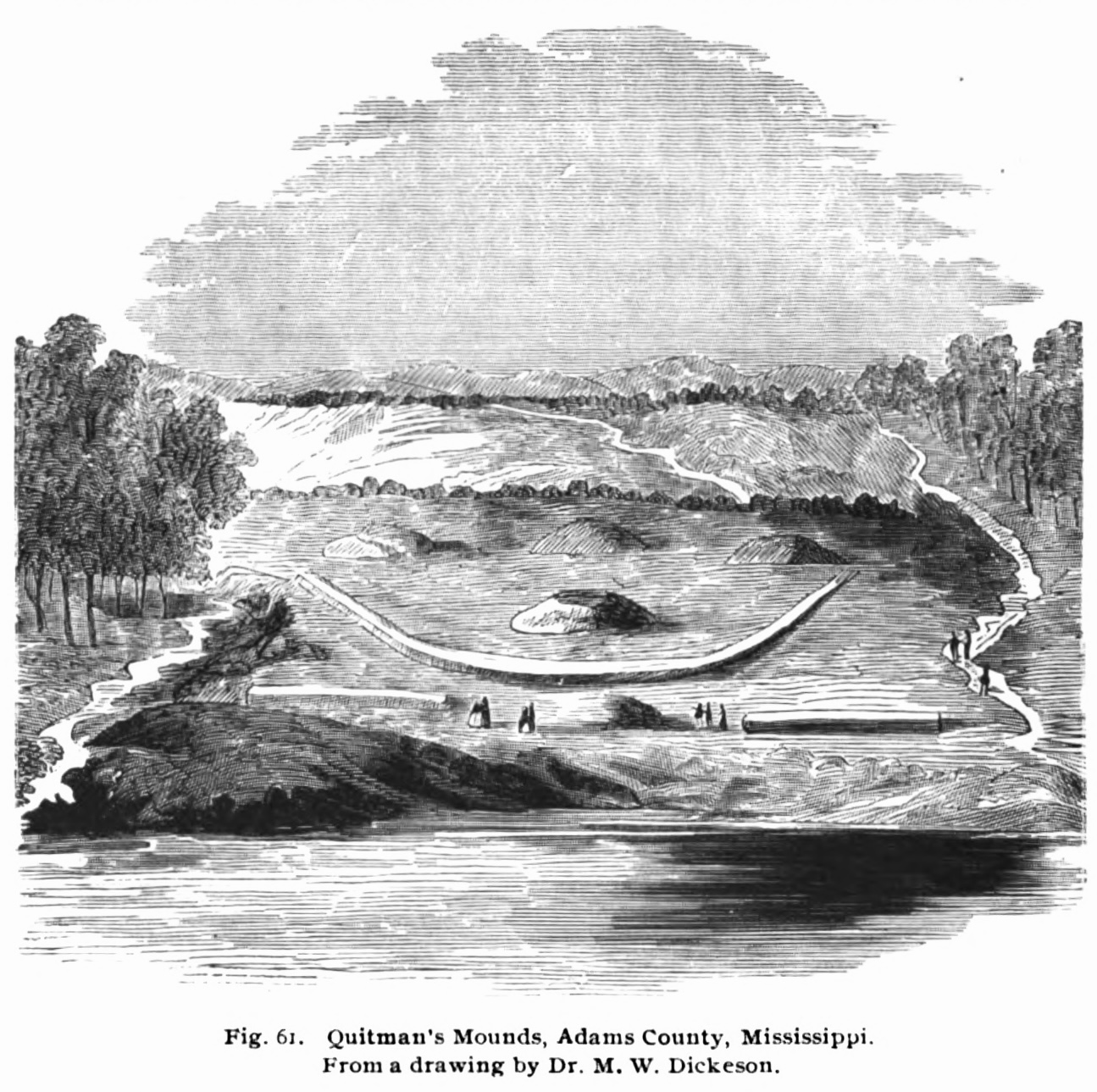
Dickeson illustration of mounds in situ

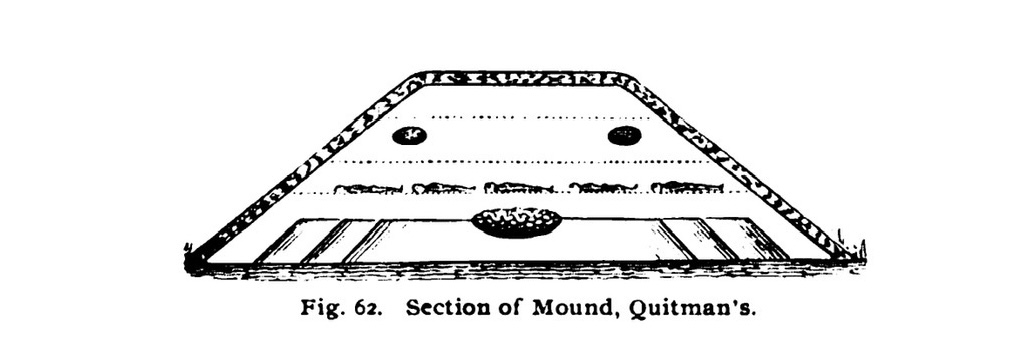
Cross-section showing stratigraphic layers of a mound excavated by Dickeson

== Filibustering ==
It was in his capacity as governor of Mississippi that Quitman was approached by Narciso López, the Venezuelan-born filibuster, to lead his expedition of 1850 to liberate Cuba from Spanish rule. He turned down the offer because of his desire to complete his term as governor but did provide assistance to López in the form of supplies of M1841 Mississippi rifles for the expedition. López departed for Cuba and captured Cárdenas, but a Spanish counterattack caused López to leave for Key West. The repercussion of the expedition led to Quitman being indicted by a federal grand jury in New Orleans for violations of the Neutrality Act of 1818. Quitman resigned as governor so that he could defend himself. The charges were dropped after three hung juries allowed him to avoid conviction.

With the encouragement of President Franklin Pierce, Quitman, with assistance from later Confederate General Mansfield Lovell, began preparations in July 1853 for a filibuster expedition of his own. The preparations to invade Cuba were nearly complete, with several thousand men prepared to go, when in May 1854, the administration reversed course and undertook steps to stop what it had almost put into motion, presumably because it felt that in the wake of the furor over the passage of the Kansas–Nebraska Act, the action to add slave territory such as Cuba would cause irreparable damage to the Democratic Party in the North.

== Return to politics ==
During the 1852 United States presidential election, Quitman was the running mate for George Troup on the Southern Rights Party.

On March 4, 1855, Quitman was elected to the 34th United States Congress as a representative from Mississippi's 5th congressional district and served until his death during the 35th Congress. On April 29, 1856, Quitman gave a speech mentioning a bill he introduced to repeal the first through the eleventh section of the Neutrality Act of 1818, and his desire for the United States to take possession of Cuba. In Congress, he was Chairman of the United States House Committee on Military Affairs.

== Death ==
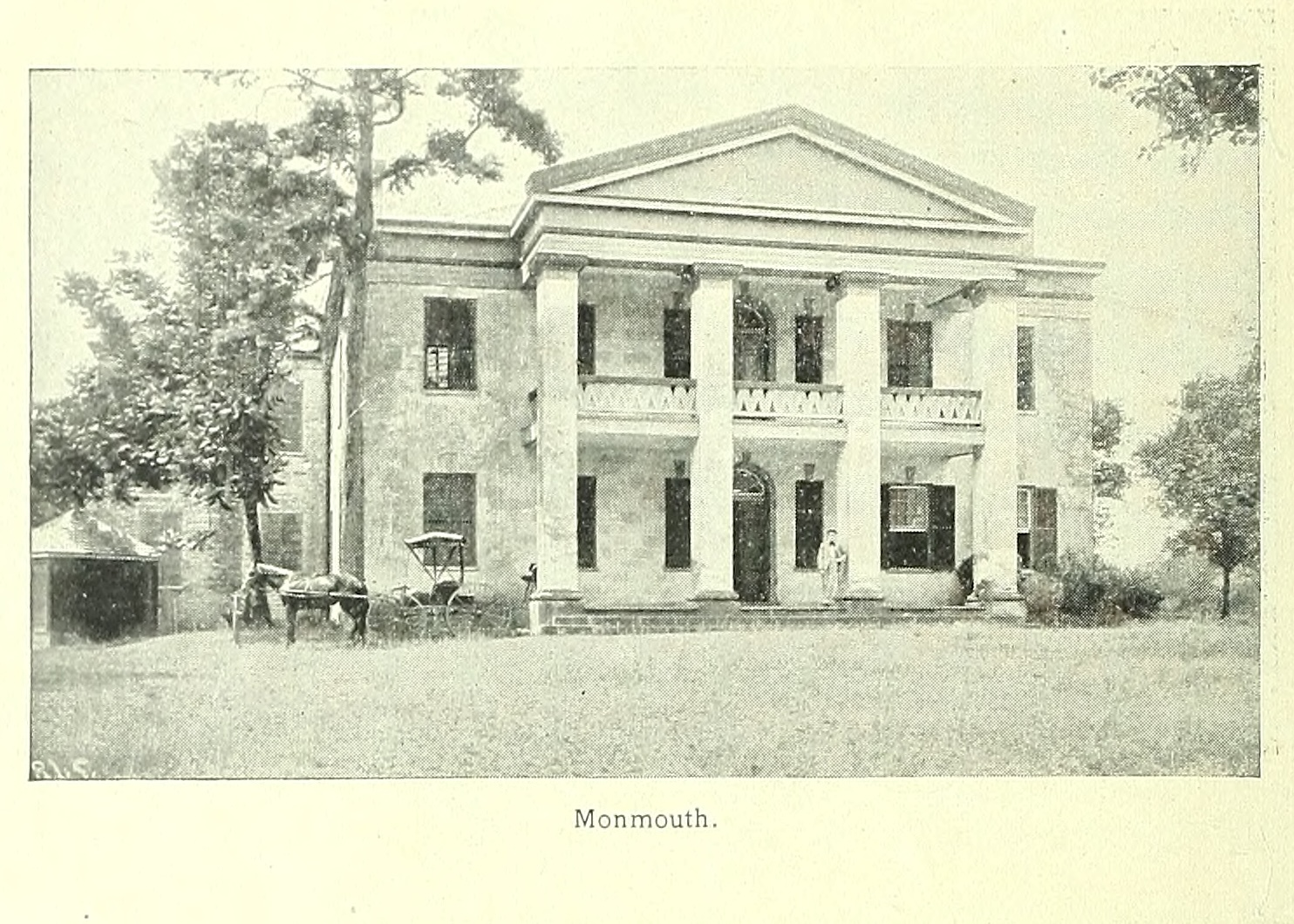
Monmouth, from The memento, old and new Natchez, 1700 to 1897

John A. Quitman died at his home, "Monmouth," near Natchez, Mississippi, on July 17, 1858, aged 59, apparently from the effects of National Hotel disease, which he contracted during the inauguration of President James Buchanan. He was buried in the Natchez City Cemetery in Natchez, Mississippi.

== Legacy ==
=== Towns ===
- Quitman, Texas
- Quitman, Mississippi
- Quitman, Georgia
- Quitman, Missouri
- Quitman, Arkansas

=== Counties ===
- Quitman County, Georgia
- Quitman County, Mississippi

=== Other ===
The United States Army military installation Fort Quitman in Texas was named in his honor.

A Confederate steamboat which was provided by the State of Louisiana for the defense of New Orleans and armed with two rifled 32 pounders was named in his honor.

== See also ==
- List of members of the United States Congress who died in office (1790–1899)
- List of members of the United States Congress killed or wounded in office
- William B. Griffith, law partner
- John T. McMurran, law partner

== Notes ==
Political offices
Preceded by Hiram Runnels	Governor of Mississippi; Acting; 1835–1836	Succeeded by Charles Lynch
Preceded by Joseph W. Matthews	Governor of Mississippi; 1850–1851	Succeeded by John Guion
Party political offices
Preceded by Joseph W. Matthews	Democratic nominee for Governor of Mississippi; 1849	Vacant Title next held by John J. McRae; 1853
U.S. House of Representatives
New constituency	Member of the U.S. House of Representatives from Mississippi's 5th congressional district 1855–1858	Succeeded by John J. McRae
Preceded by Thomas Benton	Chair of the House Military Affairs Committee; 1855–1858	Succeeded by Charles J. Faulkner
