= 1831 Mississippi gubernatorial election =

- August 1, 1831
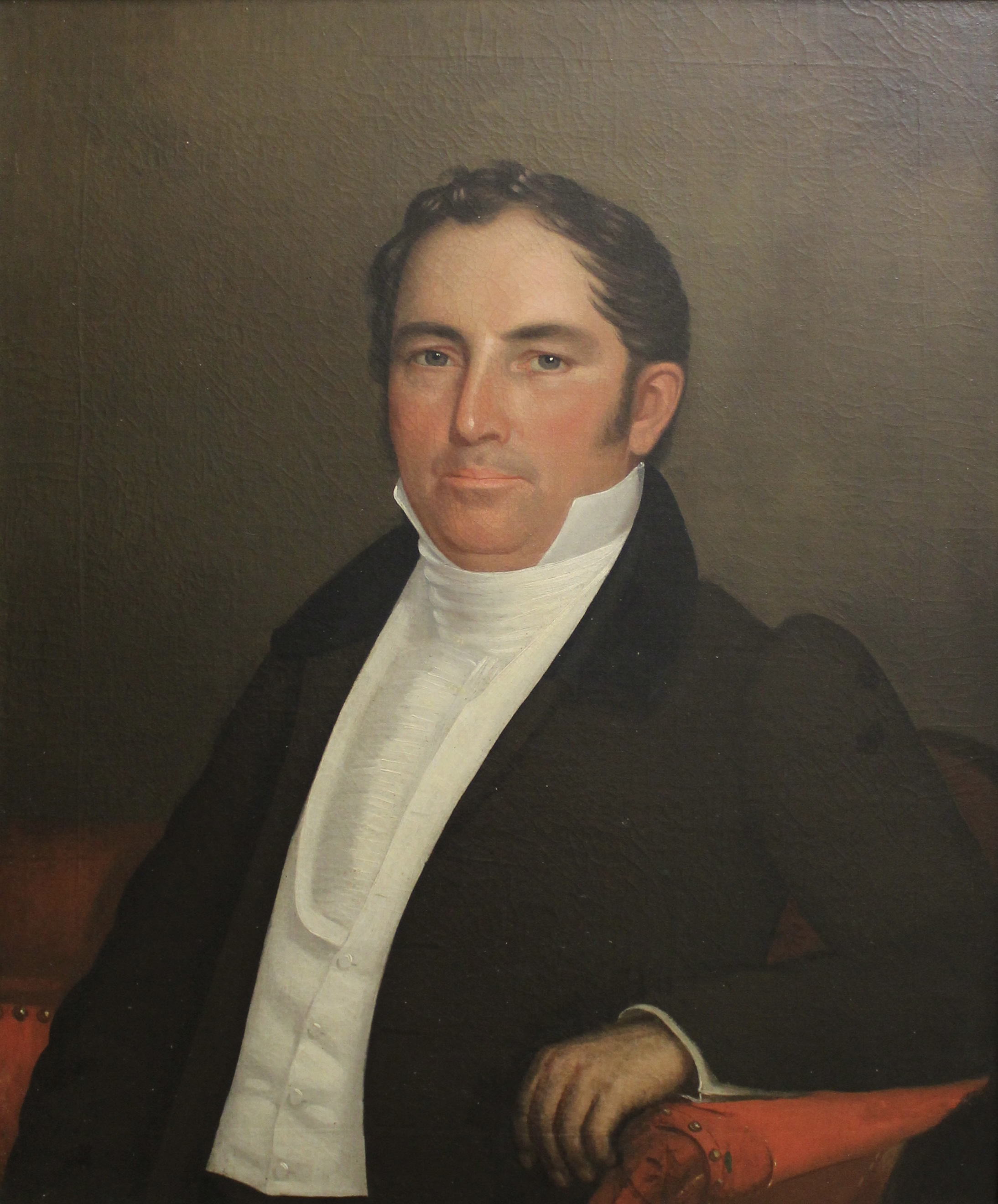

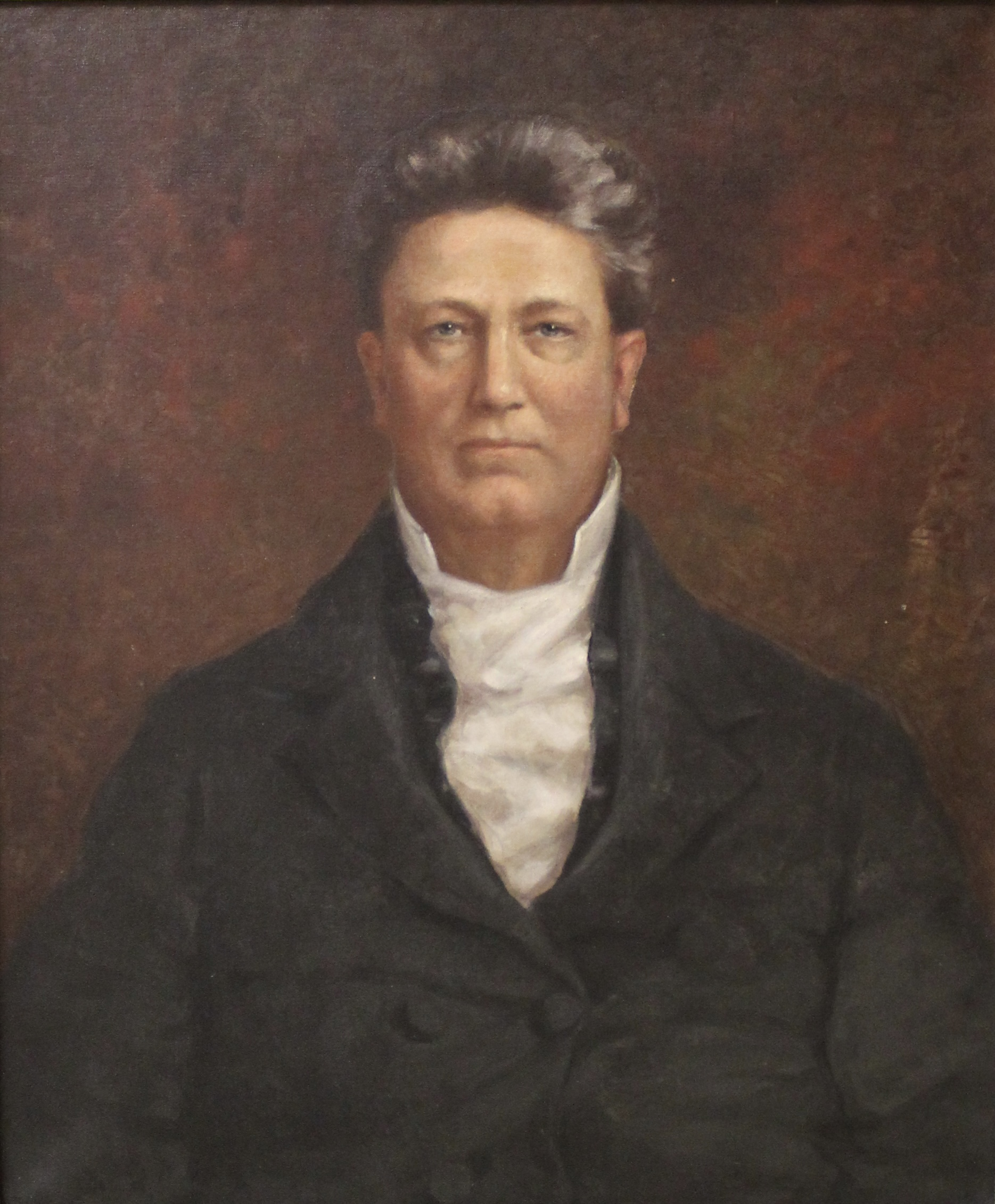

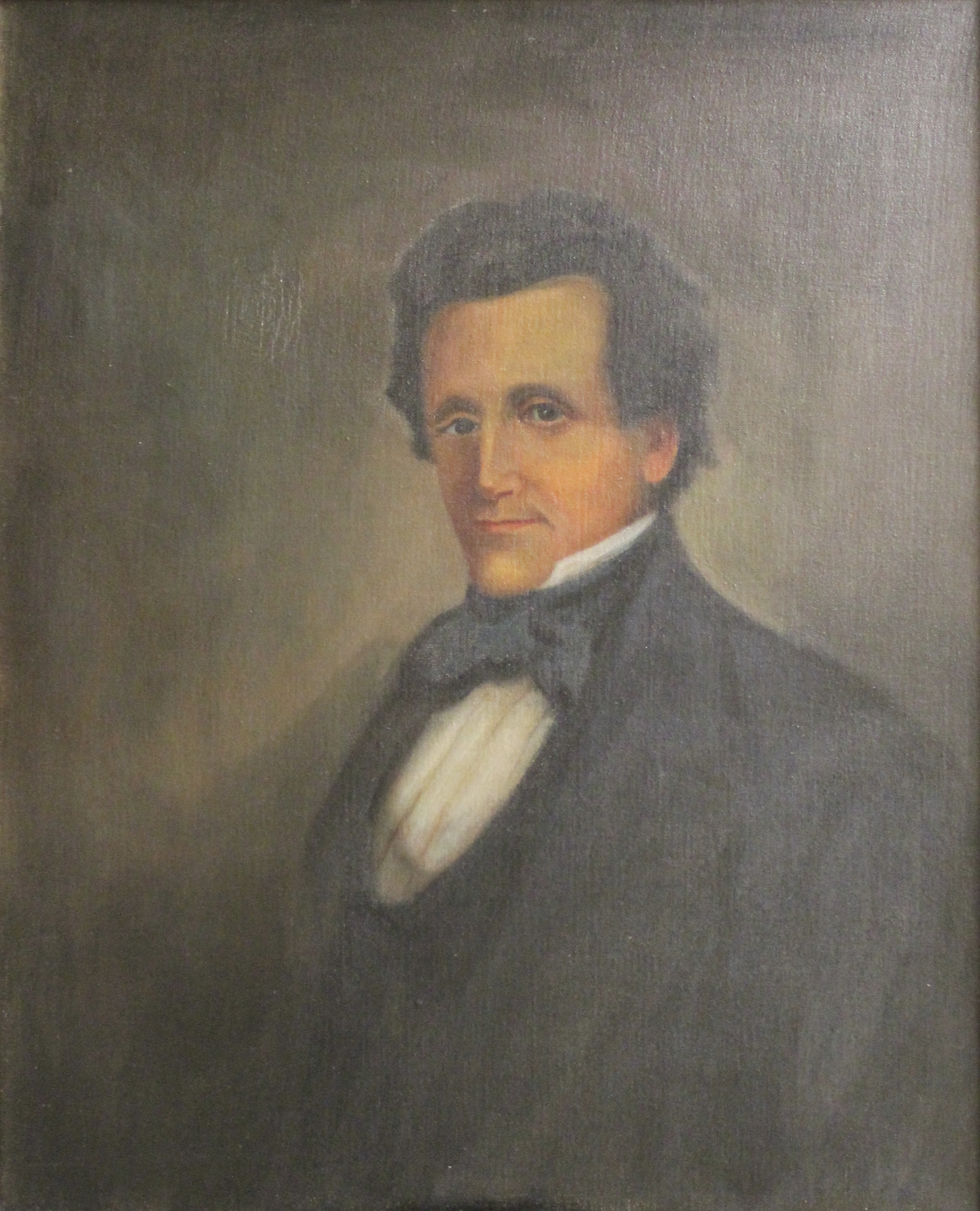
Nominee	Abram M. Scott	Hiram G. Runnels	Charles Lynch
Party	National Republican	Democratic	Democratic
Popular vote	3,958	3,711	2,902
Percentage	31.61%	29.67%	23.20%
- County results Scott: 50–60% 60–70% 70–80% Runnels: 40–50% 50–60% 60–70% 80–90% Lynch: 40–50% 50–60% 60–70% 70–80% Harris: 50–60% Gordon: 40–50% Tie: 30–40%
Governor before election
Gerard Brandon
Democratic
Elected Governor
Abram M. Scott
National Republican

The 1831 Mississippi gubernatorial election was held on August 1, 1831, to elect the governor of Mississippi. Abram M. Scott, a National Republican won against Democrats Hiram G. Runnels and Charles Lynch. (Note: Glashan 1979 labels Scott as both an Independent Republican or National Republican, whereas John Raimo and Robert Sobel 1978 label him a National Republican.) Two other candidates, Wiley P. Harris and Adam Gordon, received scattered votes.

== Results ==
Mississippi gubernatorial election, 1831
Party	Candidate	Votes	%
National Republican	Abram M. Scott	3,953	31.61%
Democratic	Hiram G. Runnels	3,711	29.67%
Democratic	Charles Lynch	2,902	23.20%
Democratic	Wiley P. Harris	1,449	11.59%
Independent	Adam Gordon	492	3.93%
Total votes		12,507	100.00
National Republican gain from Democratic			
