= 1839 Mississippi gubernatorial election =

- November 4, 1839
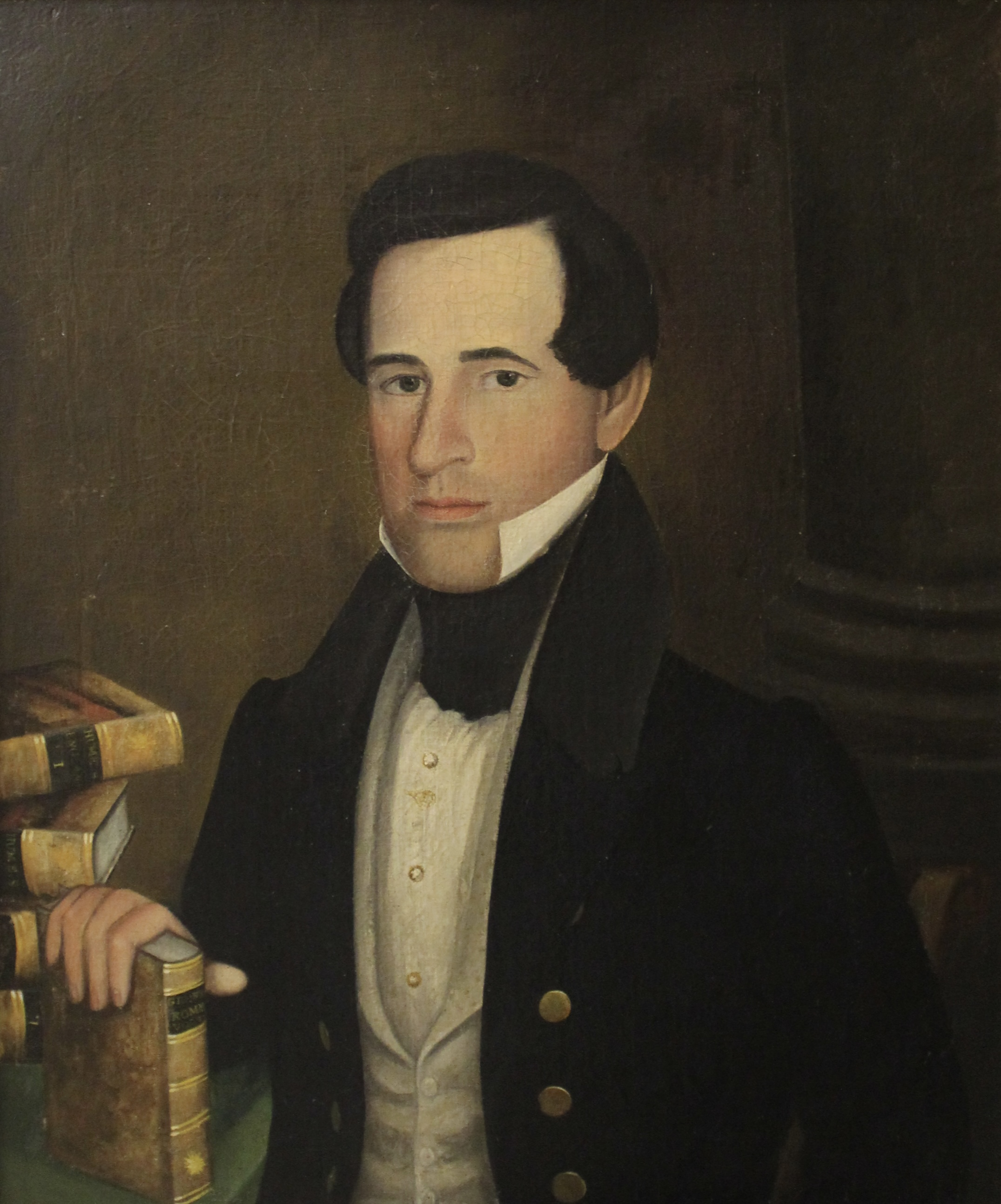

Nominee	Alexander G. McNutt	Edward Turner
Party	Democratic	Whig
Popular vote	18,800	15,886
Percentage	54.20%	45.80%
- County results McNutt: 50–60% 60–70% 70–80% 80–90% >90% Turner: 50–60% 60–70% 70–80% Tie: 50%
Governor before election
Alexander G. McNutt
Democratic
Elected Governor
Tilghman Tucker
Democratic

The 1839 Mississippi gubernatorial election was held on November 4, 1839, to elect the governor of Mississippi. Alexander G. McNutt, an incumbent Democrat won against Whig candidate Edward Turner.

== General election ==
During McNutt's administrations, a banking controversy unfolded in Mississippi with economic and political repercussions. Stemming from President Andrew Jackson's attack on the national bank and efforts to curb inflation, the Panic of 1837 ensued. In response to the crisis, Mississippi chartered the Union Bank in 1838, approving the Supplementary Act to boost its capital. However, the move exacerbated financial issues, leading to blame on banking institutions, especially the Union Bank. The Democrats, aligning with anti-bank sentiment, capitalized on this during the 1839 election, securing Governor McNutt's reelection against the Whigs amidst ongoing economic challenges in the state.

== Results ==
Mississippi gubernatorial election, 1839
Party	Candidate	Votes	%
Democratic	Alexander G. McNutt (incumbent)	18,800	54.20%
Whig	Edward Turner	15,886	45.80%
Total votes		34,686	100.00
Democratic hold			
