= 1835 Mississippi gubernatorial election =

- November 2, 1835
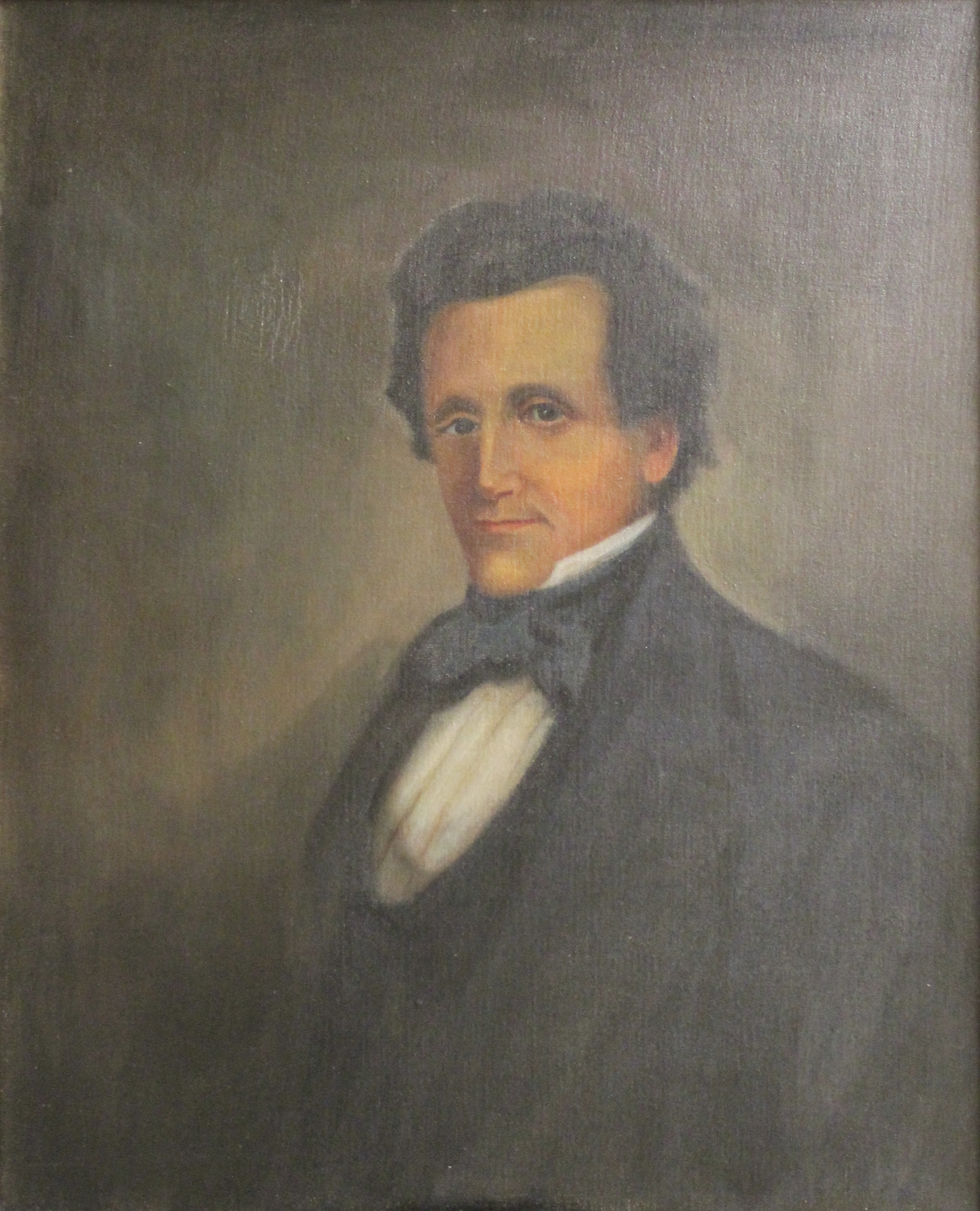

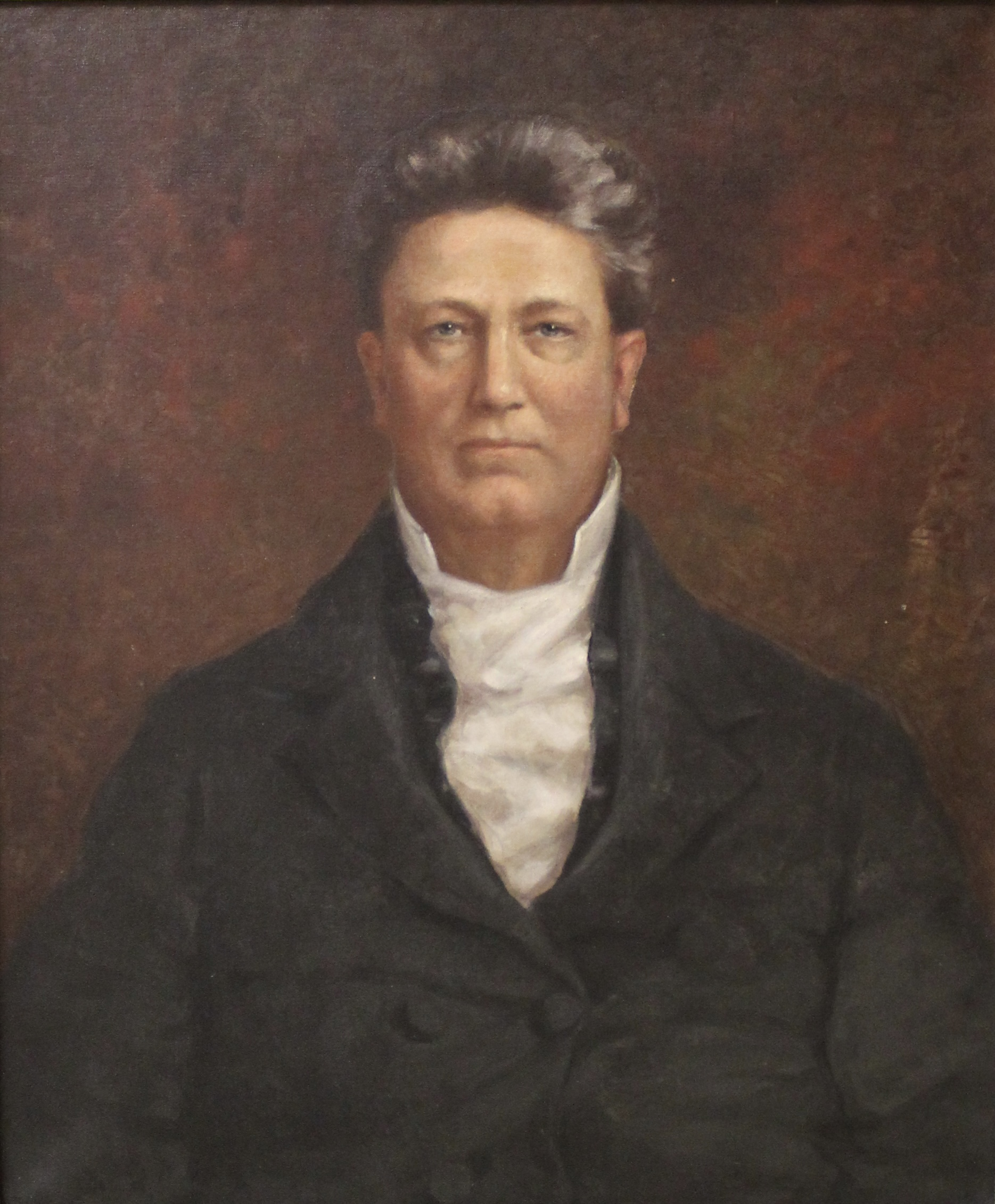
Nominee	Charles Lynch	Hiram Runnels
Party	Whig	Democratic
Popular vote	9,867	9,441
Percentage	51.10%	48.90%
- County results Lynch: 50–60% 60–70% 70–80% 80–90% Runnels: 50–60% 60–70% 70–80% 80–90% >90% No votes
Governor before election
Hiram Runnels
Democratic
Elected Governor
Charles Lynch
Whig

The 1835 Mississippi gubernatorial election was held on November 2, 1835, to elect the governor of Mississippi. Charles Lynch, a Whig, won against incumbent Governor Hiram Runnels, a Democrat.

== Results ==
Mississippi gubernatorial election, 1835
Party	Candidate	Votes	%
Whig	Charles Lynch	9,867	51.10%
Democratic	Hiram Runnels (incumbent)	9,441	48.90%
Total votes		19,308	100.00
Whig gain from Democratic			
