= Alexander McNutt (politician) =

Mississippi Governor from 1838 to 1842

Alexander G. McNutt
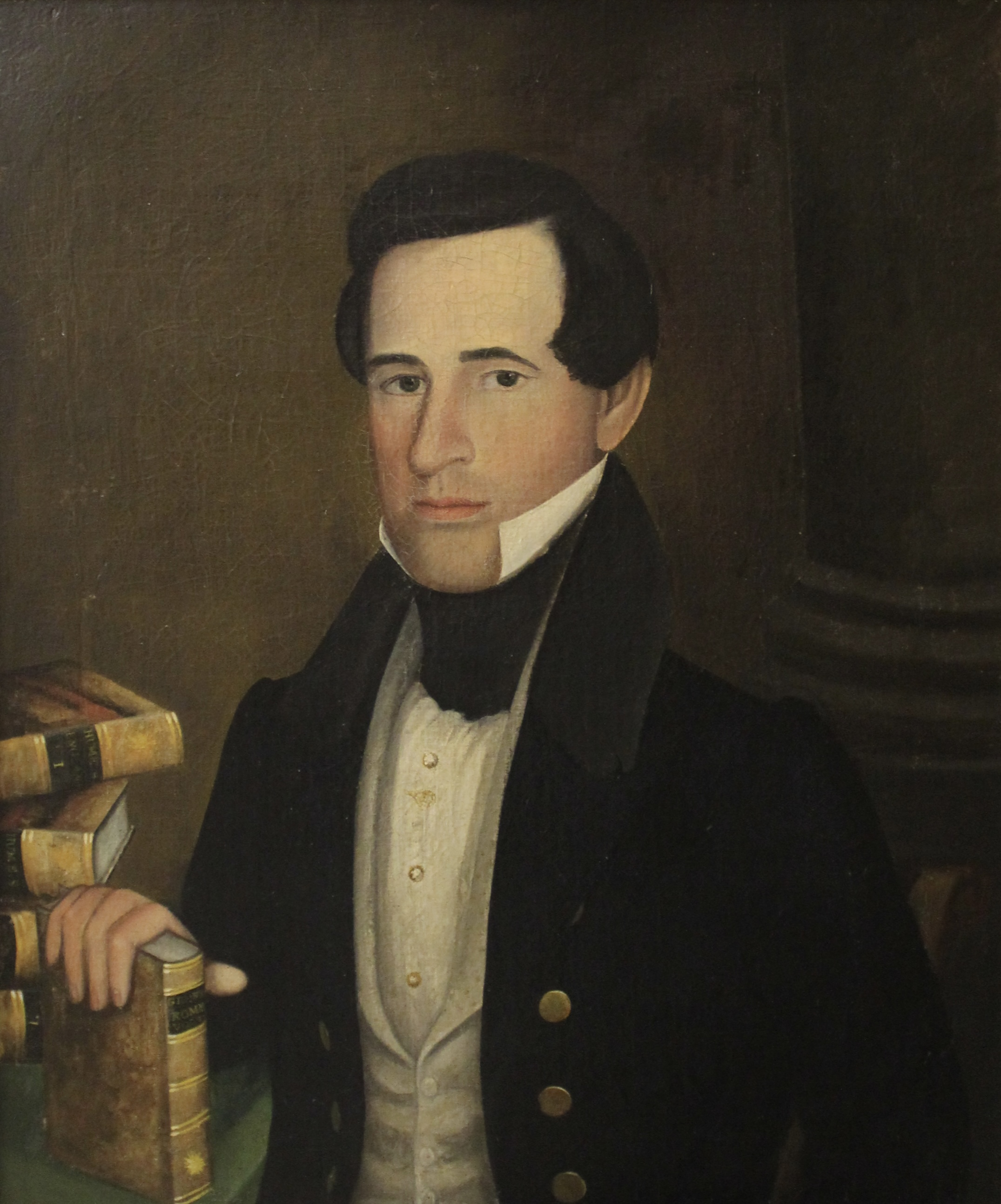

12th Governor of Mississippi
- In office January 8, 1838 – January 10, 1842
- Preceded by: Charles Lynch
- Succeeded by: Tilghman Tucker

Member of the Mississippi Senate
- In office 1835

Personal details
- Born: January 3, 1802 Rockbridge County, Virginia, U.S.
- Died: October 22, 1848 (aged 46) DeSoto County, Mississippi, U.S.
- Party: Democratic
- Education: Washington and Lee University

Alexander Gallatin McNutt (January 3, 1802 – October 22, 1848) was a Mississippi attorney and politician who served as Governor from 1838 to 1842.

== Early life ==
Alexander G. McNutt was born into an aristocratic landowning family in Rockbridge County, Virginia on January 3, 1802. He graduated from Washington College (now Washington and Lee University) in 1821, studied law, and moved to Jackson, Mississippi in the early 1820s. He subsequently relocated to Vicksburg, where he practiced in partnership with Joel Cameron. When Cameron was murdered by his slaves in 1833, McNutt subsequently married Cameron's widow, Elizabeth Lewis Cameron. (Before the slaves were executed, a free black man who was also implicated blamed McNutt for the murder, stating that McNutt had instigated it in order to profit by Cameron's death.)

== Political career ==
A Democrat, in 1829 he served as a Selectman in Vicksburg. In 1835 McNutt was elected to the Mississippi State Senate. In 1837 he was elected President of the Senate.

McNutt ran successfully for governor in 1837 and in 1839, serving two terms from 1838 to 1842. During his term Mississippi founded its state library and procured land for construction of a state university, and construction was completed on the state penitentiary. The northern boundary with the State of Tennessee was resurveyed, but the new boundary did not result in more territory for Mississippi and the new city of Memphis proved to outside the bounds of the survey which had been an aim for some of the advocates of the resurvey.

During his governorship, McNutt opposed central banking, including Mississippi's Planters and Union Banks, in which the state had large ownership stakes, arguing that the stockholders and managers were corrupt. The banks sold bonds in an effort to raise revenue, which the state repudiated under McNutt's influence, leaving the state with a large debt.

After leaving office he resumed practicing law. In 1847 he ran unsuccessfully for the United States Senate, losing to Henry S. Foote.

In 1848, McNutt campaigned for the presidential ticket headed by Lewis Cass and was a candidate for presidential elector. While in Desoto County, he became ill and died on October 22, 1848. He was buried in Greenwood Cemetery in Jackson, Section 6, Lot 57.

== Legacy ==
McNutt's home is a Vicksburg landmark and listed on the National Register of Historic Places. The community of McNutt, Mississippi is named in honor of McNutt.

== Gallery ==
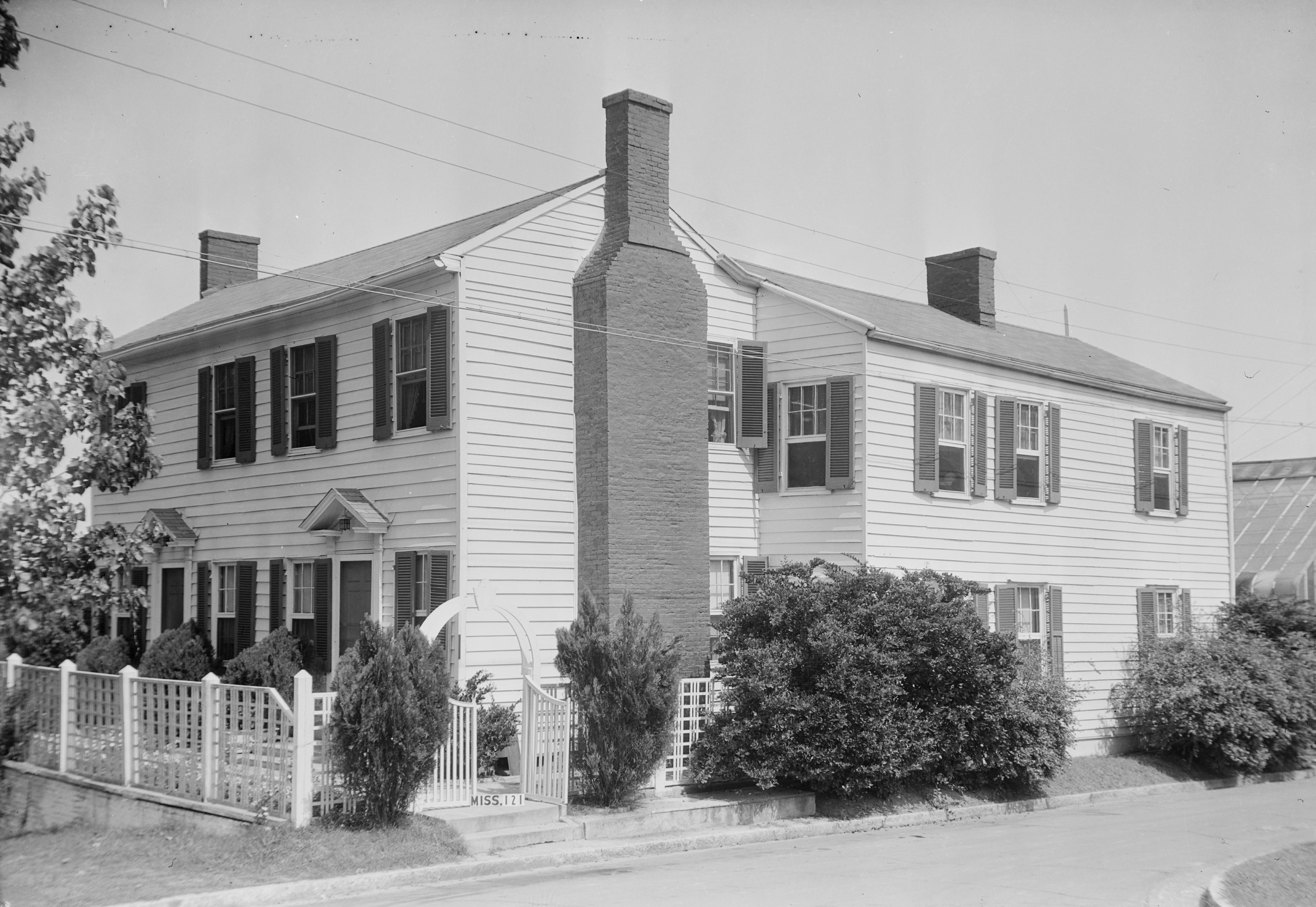
McNutt's house in Vicksburg

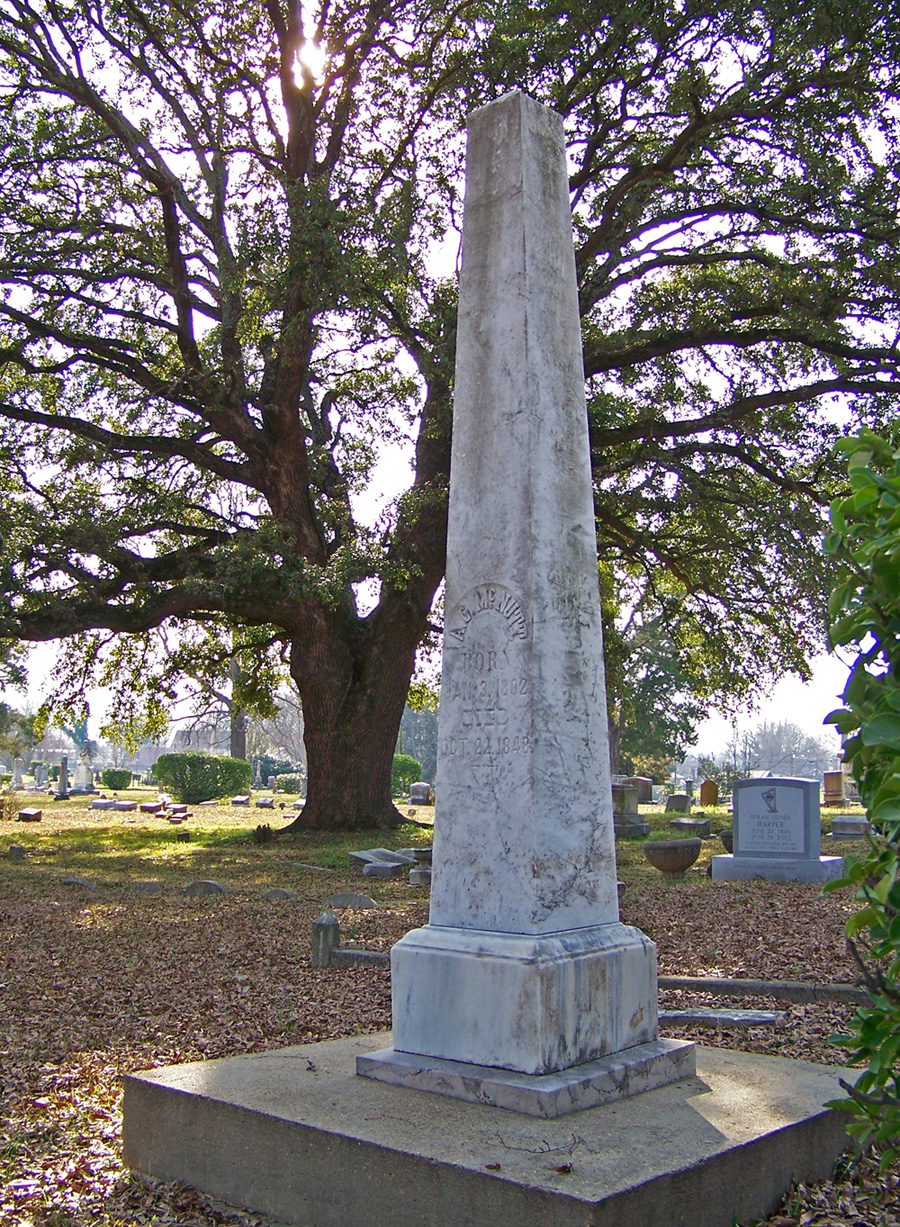
Burial site in Greenwood Cemetery, Jackson

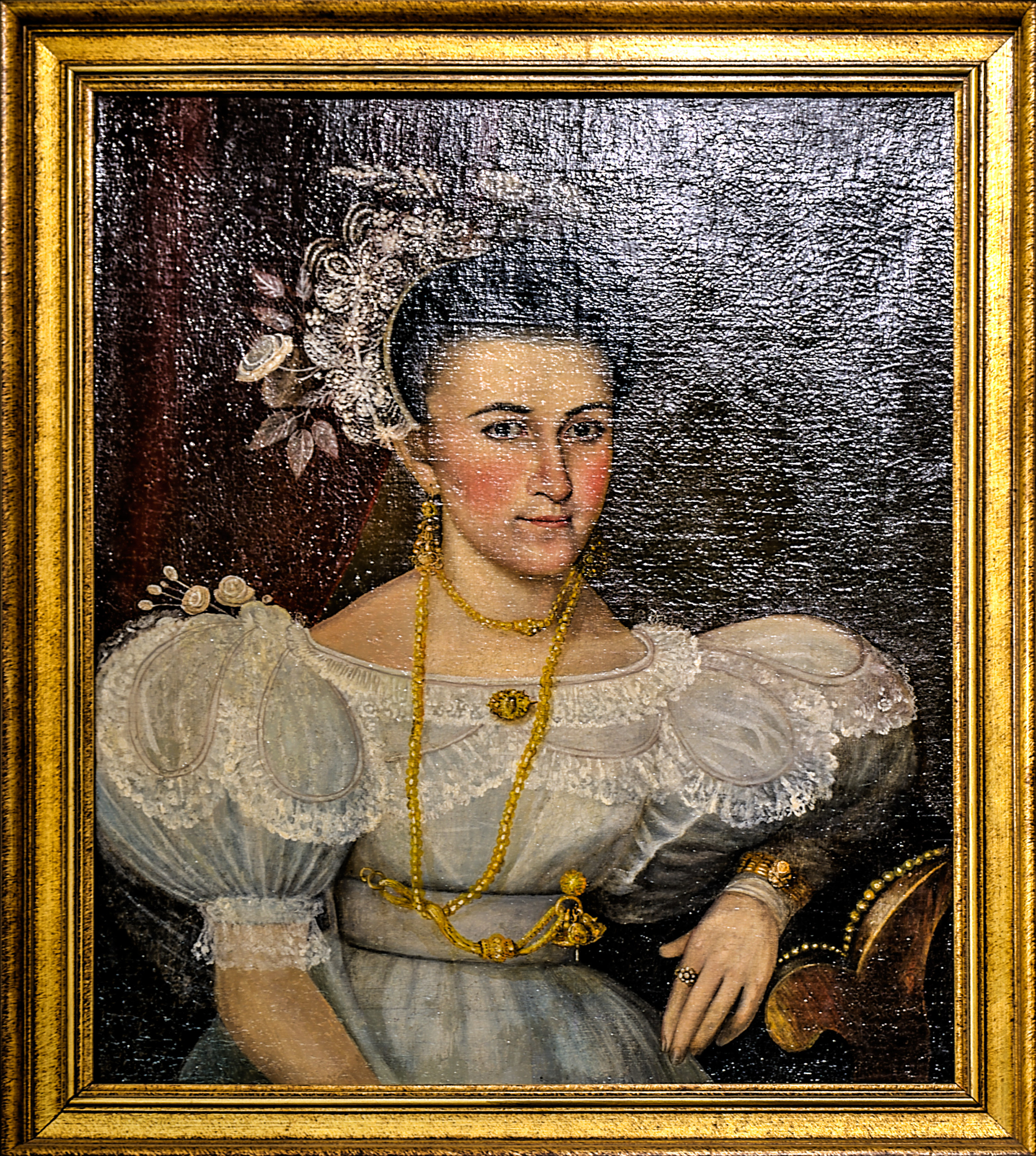
Painting of Elizabeth McNutt on display at the Old Warren County Courthouse

Party political offices
Preceded by Hiram Runnels	Democratic nominee for Governor of Mississippi; 1837, 1839	Succeeded by Tilghman Tucker
Political offices
Preceded by Charles Lynch	Governor of Mississippi; 1838-1842	Succeeded by Tilghman Tucker
