= 1911 Mississippi gubernatorial election =

- November 7, 1911
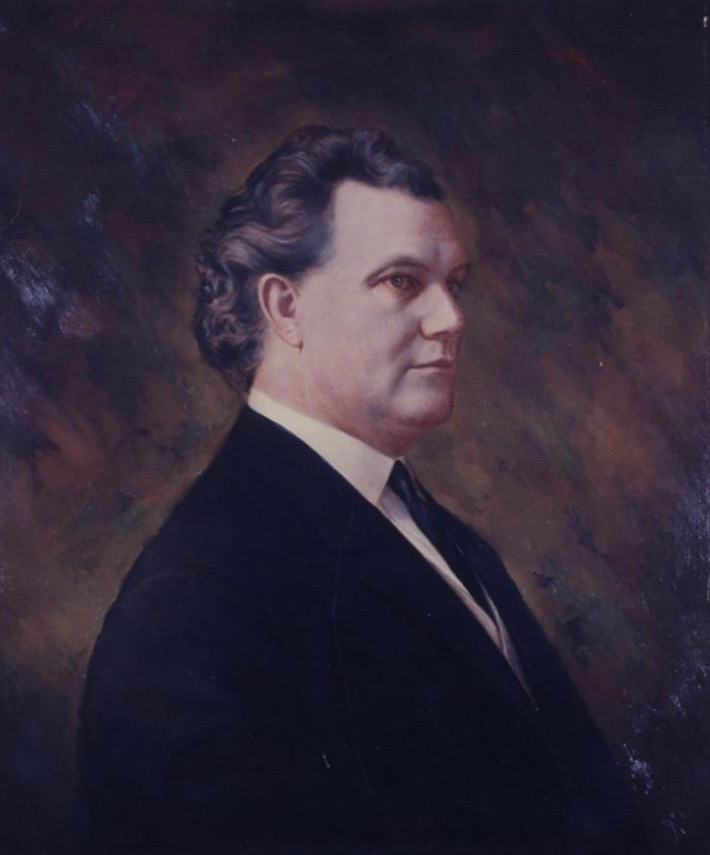

Nominee	Earl L. Brewer	Summer W. Rose
Party	Democratic	Socialist
Popular vote	40,471	2,049
Percentage	95.18%	4.82%
- County results Brewer: 80–90% >90%
Governor before election
Edmond Noel
Democratic
Elected Governor
Earl L. Brewer
Democratic

The 1911 Mississippi gubernatorial election took place on November 7, 1911, in order to elect the Governor of Mississippi. Incumbent Democrat Edmond Noel was term-limited, and could not run for reelection to a second term.

== Democratic primary ==
The Democratic primary election was scheduled for August 1, 1911. However, on July 17, 1911, the State Democratic Executive Committee declared that Earl L. Brewer was unopposed and was declared the nominee.

=== Results ===
Mississippi Democratic gubernatorial primary, 1911
Party	Candidate	Votes	%
Democratic	Earl L. Brewer	unopposed	

== General election ==
In the general election, Democratic candidate Earl L. Brewer, a district attorney and former state senator, easily defeated Socialist candidate Summer W. Rose.

=== Results ===
Mississippi gubernatorial election, 1911
Party	Candidate	Votes	%
Democratic	Earl L. Brewer	40,471	95.18
Socialist	Summer W. Rose	2,049	4.82
Total votes		42,520	100.00
Democratic hold			
