= 1915 Mississippi gubernatorial election =

- November 2, 1915
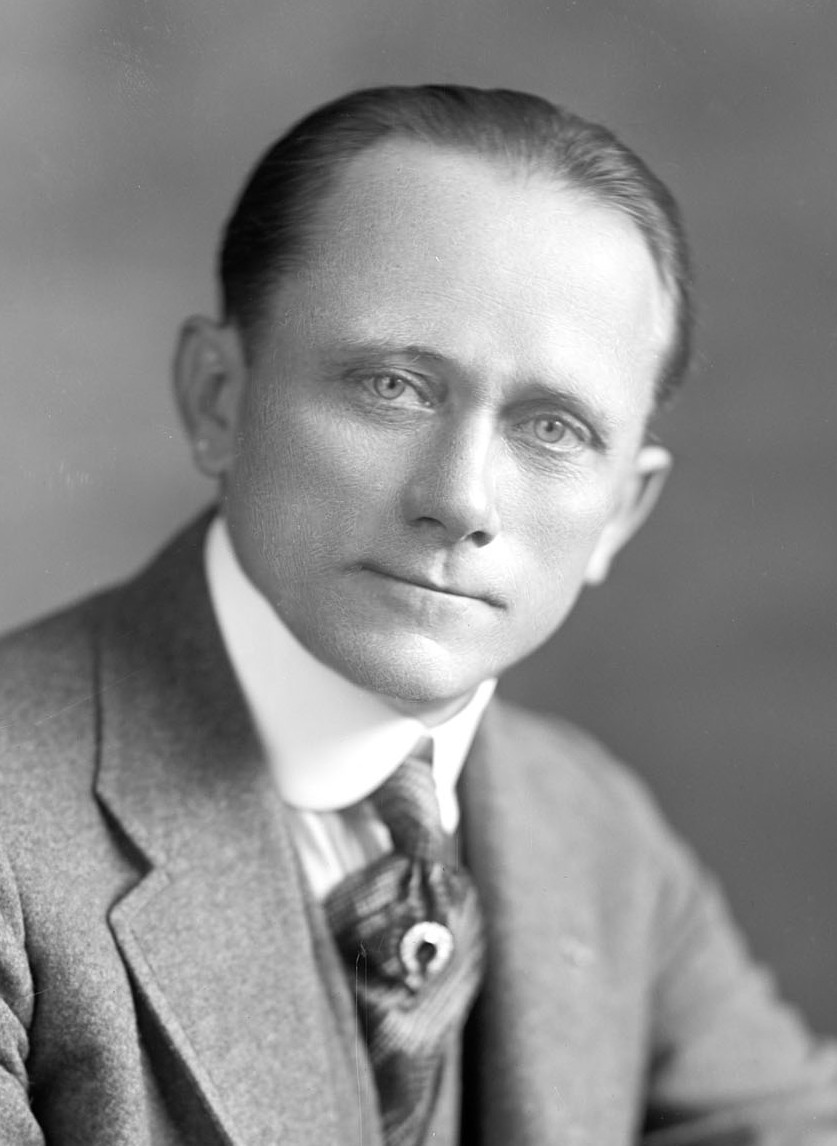

Nominee	Theodore G. Bilbo	J. T. Lester
Party	Democratic	Socialist
Popular vote	50,541	4,046
Percentage	92.59%	7.41%
- County results Bilbo: 60–70% 80–90% >90%
Governor before election
Earl L. Brewer
Democratic
Elected Governor
Theodore G. Bilbo
Democratic

The 1915 Mississippi gubernatorial election took place on November 2, 1915, to elect the Governor of Mississippi. Incumbent Democrat Earl L. Brewer was term-limited, and could not run for reelection to a second term. As was common at the time, the Democratic candidate won in a landslide in the general election, so therefore the Democratic primary was the real contest, and winning the primary was considered tantamount to election. This election was the first Mississippi gubernatorial election since 1895 that the winner of the gubernatorial election was of the same party as the incumbent president.

== Democratic primary ==
In the Democratic primary, Lieutenant Governor Theodore G. Bilbo received just over 50% of the vote, eliminating the need for a runoff. He defeated 4 other candidates to win the nomination.

=== Results ===
Mississippi Democratic gubernatorial primary, 3 August 1915
Party	Candidate	Votes	%
Democratic	Theodore G. Bilbo	74,573	50.36
Democratic	M. W. Riley	47,717	32.23
Democratic	John R. Tally	11,451	7.73
Democratic	Mr. Quinn	7,627	5.15
Democratic	Peter Simpson Stovall	6,706	4.53
Total votes		148,074	100.00

== General election ==
In the general election, Bilbo easily defeated Socialist candidate J. T. Lester.

=== Results ===
Mississippi gubernatorial election, 1915
Party	Candidate	Votes	%
Democratic	Theodore G. Bilbo	50,541	92.59
Socialist	J. T. Lester	4,046	7.41
Total votes		54,587	100.00
Democratic hold			
