= Hiram Runnels =

American politician (1796–1857)

Hiram George Runnels
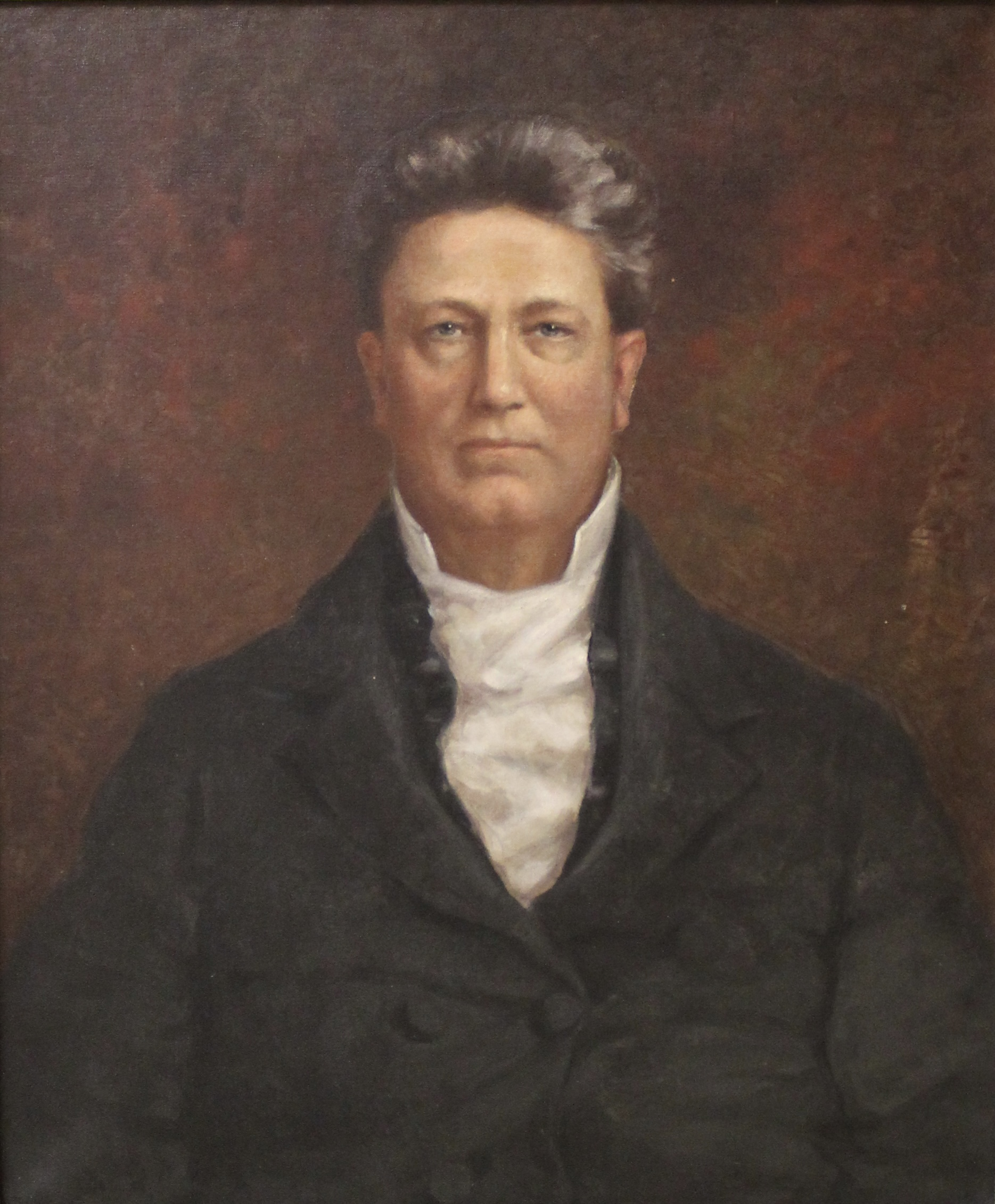
- Portrait of Runnels, c. 1835

9th Governor of Mississippi
- In office November 20, 1833 – November 20, 1835
- Preceded by: Charles Lynch
- Succeeded by: John A. Quitman

State Auditor of Mississippi
- In office 1822-1830
- Governor: Walter Leake; Gerard Brandon
- Preceded by: John Richards
- Succeeded by: Thomas B.J. Hadley

Member of the Mississippi House of Representatives
- In office 1829; 1841

Personal details
- Born: Hiram George Runnels; December 15, 1796 Hancock County Georgia, U.S.
- Died: December 17, 1857 (aged 61) Houston, Texas, U.S.
- Party: Democratic
- Spouse: Obedience Smith Runnels
- Relatives: Harmon Runnels (father), Howell W. Runnels (brother), Hardin D. Runnels (brother), Hardin Richard Runnels (nephew)

Hiram George Runnels (December 15, 1796 – December 17, 1857) was a U.S. politician from the states of Mississippi and Texas.

He was a Democrat who served as the ninth governor of Mississippi from November 20, 1833, to December 3, 1835.

== Biography ==
Runnels was born in Hancock County, Georgia, on December 15, 1796, to Hester (Hubert) and Harmon M. Runnels. The Runnels relocated to Mississippi Territory when Hiram was a child. The family descended from English colonists. The Runnels were the first white people to build a house in what would become Monticello, Mississippi. He married Obedience Smith in 1823.

Although he received a limited education, Runnels worked as a schoolteacher before serving as the state's auditor and treasurer from 1822 to 1830. Runnels also served as a volunteer in the army during various conflicts with Native Americans. He was elected in the Mississippi House of Representatives in 1830. After an unsuccessful run for governor in 1831, Runnels was elected in May 1833 by only 558 votes. Due to the closeness of the result, he did not take office until the following November.

During his tenure as governor, Runnels secured funding for a new statehouse in Jackson, restructured the state militia, signed a ban on the importation of enslaved people for auction and oversaw the formation of sixteen new counties in the land seized from the Chickasaw Indians. A devoted Jacksonian Democrat, Runnels angered his political allies when he refused to order the state militia to support and arm vigilantes who killed and maimed dozens of white and black people suspected of inciting a slave rebellion during the summer of 1835. On the other hand, more conservative voters and Whigs accused Runnels of verbally condoning vigilantism and preventing the militia and local law enforcement officials from suppressing extralegal violence. Facing criticism from Whigs and many Democrats over the affair, Runnels narrowly lost his reelection bid and left office in November 1835. He owned property in the northwestern quarter of the state, and "The present town of Grenada originally embraced two rival towns. The western town situated on the Yalobusha River was founded by a company headed by Franklin E. Plummer. It was known as Pittsburg. Adjoining it on the east was the town of Tulahoma, which was founded by a company headed by Hiram G. Runnels. There was an inveterate opposition be- tween the two towns similar to that existing between their founders, who were uncompromising political enemies. This antagonism greatly impeded the progress of both towns."

In 1838, Runnels was appointed president of the newly chartered Union Bank in Jackson, placing him in deeper conflict with other Democrats. When Union Bank collapsed in 1840, the new governor of Mississippi, Alexander McNutt, accused Runnels and others of corruption. Runnels responded by canning the governor in the streets of Jackson. Debates related to the state's central banking system also led to a duel between Runnels and Volney E. Howard, a director at Union Bank, that same year. His wife listed 29 slaves as her "separate property" possibly "in anticipation of an imminent duel...so that her property would not be affected if her husband should die." Despite these conflicts, Runnels was reelected to represent Hinds County in the state legislature in 1841.

Runnels moved to Texas in 1842 and purchased a cotton plantation located on the Brazos River near Houston. He represented Brazoria County during the Convention of 1845. He was elected to the Texas State Senate in 1855 but failed to qualify for office. He was elected to the Senate again in 1857 but died before taking office. The Texas Senate passed a memorial resolution in his honor, and Benjamin F. Tankersly was sworn into office in his stead.

Runnels died in Houston on December 17, 1857, and was buried in Glenwood Cemetery.

== Personality ==
The son of a man who "would fire up and fight anybody and at any time," Runnels's personality reflected the rough-hewn violence of his frontier upbringing. Described as excitable and volatile, his narrow defeat in the 1835 Mississippi gubernatorial race was partially attributed to an emotional outburst against one of his opponents during which he used some very harsh and unparliamentary language.

== Legacy ==
Runnels County, Texas, was named in his honor.

Runnels was the uncle of Texas Governor Hardin Richard Runnels, and William R. Baker, a Texas State Senator was married to Runnels's niece, Hester.

== See also ==
- Howell W. Runnels, his brother
- Hardin D. Runnels, his brother

Party political offices
First	Democratic nominee for Governor of Mississippi; 1833, 1835	Succeeded by Alexander McNutt
Political offices
Preceded by Charles Lynch	Governor of Mississippi; 1833 – 1835	Succeeded by John A. Quitman
