= Charles Lynch (politician) =

American politician

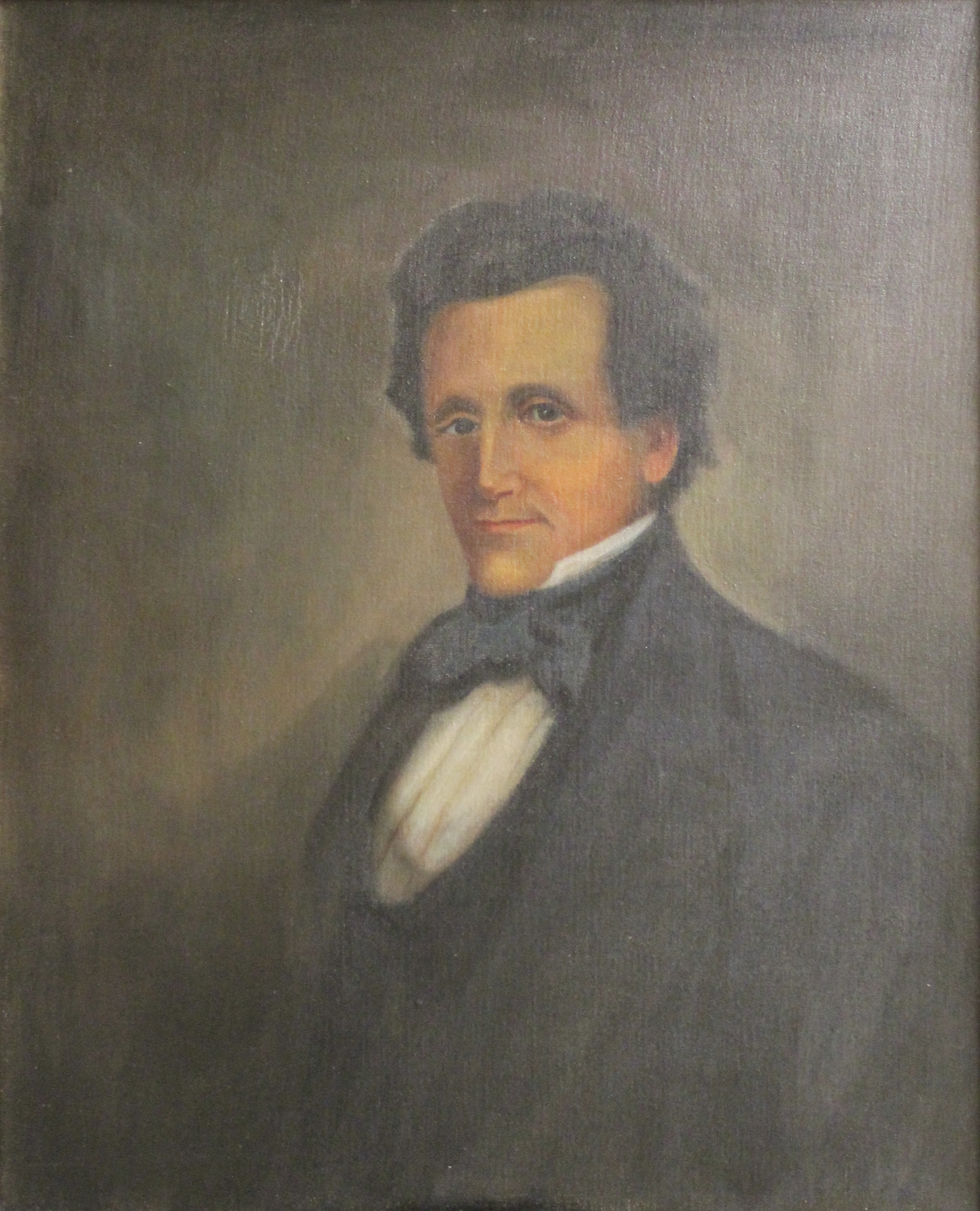
- Portrait, c. 1833

8th and 11th Governor of Mississippi
- In office June 12, 1833 – November 20, 1833
- Preceded by: Abram M. Scott
- Succeeded by: Hiram Runnels
- In office January 7, 1836 – January 8, 1838
- Preceded by: John A. Quitman
- Succeeded by: Alexander G. McNutt

Member of the Mississippi State Senate
- In office 1827
- In office 1832–1833

Personal details
- Born: August 8, 1783 Jefferson County, Virginia (in modern-day Shelby County, Kentucky), U.S.
- Died: February 9, 1853 (aged 69) Monticello, Mississippi, U.S.
- Party: Democratic (before 1833); Whig (1833–1852)

Charles Lynch (August 8, 1783 – February 9, 1853) was a Democratic and Whig politician who served as Governor of Mississippi and was a former enslaver.

== Early life and career ==
Charles Lynch was born in 1783 in either South Carolina or Virginia. He was born into a planter family, and settled as a farmer near Monticello, Mississippi, sometime before 1821, when he was appointed probate judge of Lawrence County, Mississippi.

In 1827, he was elected to the Mississippi State Senate, and returned to the State Senate after the Constitutional Convention of 1832.

== Governorship and later life ==
Lynch returned to the Mississippi Senate in 1832. He was elected President of the Senate, and in June 1833, he succeeded Governor Abram L. Scott, who had died in office. He completed Scott's term, serving until November 1833, when he was succeeded by Hiram Runnels. In his first six-month tenure as governor, Lynch advocated for a state system of public schools, but his plan was rejected by the State Legislature.

In the 1835 Mississippi gubernatorial election, Lynch, now a Whig, ran successfully for governor, narrowly defeating incumbent Governor Hiram Runnels. He took office in January 1836 and served a two-year term. One of his first acts as governor was approving a law to create 10 new counties from land received after the Treaty of Dancing Rabbit Creek between the Choctaw tribe and the federal government.

As Governor, Lynch advocated for criminal justice reform, changing the state's criminal code, which he referred to as the "Bloody Code," and recommending the construction of a state penitentiary.

Mississippi became involved in central banking by chartering the Union Bank during his tenure. During the Panic of 1837, the state issued 5 million dollars in bonds through the Union Bank, but due to the continued decline of land prices, the Union Bank failed quickly. Lynch did not run for reelection.

After the end of Lynch's term, he served as the President of the Alabama and Mississippi Railroad and Banking Company, and served as Commissioner of Public Buildings for Jackson, Mississippi's capital, where he would oversee the construction of a new state capitol building, executive mansion, and state penitentiary, a facility known as "The Walls," located at the site of the current Mississippi State Capitol.

He died on February 9, 1853, and was buried at Greenwood Cemetery in Jackson, Mississippi.

Party political offices
Preceded by Abram M. Scott	Whig nominee for Governor of Mississippi; 1835	Vacant Title next held by Edward Turner
Political offices
Preceded by Abram M. Scott	Governor of Mississippi; 1833	Succeeded by Hiram Runnels
Preceded by John A. Quitman	Governor of Mississippi; 1836–1838	Succeeded by Alexander G. McNutt
