= List of Mississippi state legislatures =

The legislature of the U.S. state of Mississippi has convened many times since statehood became effective on December 10, 1817.

== Legislatures ==
Source for session numbers until 1965 and dates between 1942 and 2021:

Name	Session number	Start date	End date	Last election
Mississippi Constitution of 1817
1st Mississippi Legislature	1	October 6, 1817	February 6, 1818	September 1817
2nd Mississippi Legislature	2	January 1819	February 1819	
3rd Mississippi Legislature	3	January 3, 1820	February 12, 1820	
4th Mississippi Legislature	4	January 1, 1821	February 12, 1821	
5th Mississippi Legislature	5	November 5, 1821	November 24, 1821	
5th Mississippi Legislature	5b	June 3, 1822	June 30, 1822	
6th Mississippi Legislature	6	December 23, 1822	January 21, 1823	
7th Mississippi Legislature	7	December 22, 1823	January 23, 1824	
8th Mississippi Legislature	8	January 3, 1825	February 1, 1825	
9th Mississippi Legislature	9	January 2, 1826	January 31, 1826	
10th Mississippi Legislature	10	January 1, 1827	February 8, 1827	
11th Mississippi Legislature	11	January 7, 1828	January 30, 1828	
12th Mississippi Legislature	12	January 5, 1829	February 6, 1829	
13th Mississippi Legislature	13	January 4, 1830	February 13, 1830	
14th Mississippi Legislature	14	November 15, 1830	December 16, 1830	
15th Mississippi Legislature	15	November 21, 1831	December 20, 1831	
16th Mississippi Legislature	16	January 7, 1833	March 2, 1833	
17th Mississippi Legislature	17	November 18, 1833	December 25, 1833	
17th Mississippi Legislature	18	January 19, 1835	January 30, 1835	
Mississippi Constitution of 1832
1836–1838 Mississippi Legislature	19	January 1836	February 1836	
1836–1838 Mississippi Legislature	20	January 1837	January 1837	
1836–1838 Mississippi Legislature	21	April 1837	May 1837	
1838–1840 Mississippi Legislature	22	January 1838	February 1838	
1838–1840 Mississippi Legislature	23	January 1839	February 1839	
1840–1842 Mississippi Legislature	24	January 1840	February 1840	
1840–1842 Mississippi Legislature	25	January 1841	February 1841	
1842–1844 Mississippi Legislature	26	January 1842	February 1842	
1842–1844 Mississippi Legislature	27	July 1843	July 1843	
1844–1846 Mississippi Legislature	28	January 1844	February 1844	
1846–1848 Mississippi Legislature	29	January 1846	March 1846	
1848–1850 Mississippi Legislature	30	January 1848	March 1848	
1850–1852 Mississippi Legislature	31	January 1850	March 1850	
1850–1852 Mississippi Legislature	32	November 1850	November 1850	
1852–1854 Mississippi Legislature	33	January 1852	March 1852	
1852–1854 Mississippi Legislature	34	October 1852	October 1852	
1854–1856 Mississippi Legislature	35	January 1854	March 1854	
1856–1857 Mississippi Legislature	36	January 1856	March 1856	
1856–1857 Mississippi Legislature	37	December 1856	February 1857	
1857–1859 Mississippi Legislature	38	November 1857	November 1857	
1857–1859 Mississippi Legislature	39	November 1858	December 1858	
1859–1861 Mississippi Legislature	40	November 1859	February 1860	
1859–1861 Mississippi Legislature	41	November 1860	November 1860	
1859–1861 Mississippi Legislature	42	January 1861	January 1861	
1859–1861 Mississippi Legislature	43	July 1861	August 1861	
1861–1863 Mississippi Legislature	44	November 1861	January 1862	
1861–1863 Mississippi Legislature	45	December 1862	January 1863	
1863–1865 Mississippi Legislature	46	November 1863	December 1863	
1863–1865 Mississippi Legislature	47	March 1864	April 1864	
1863–1865 Mississippi Legislature	48	August 1864	August 1864	
1863–1865 Mississippi Legislature	49	February 1865	March 1865	
1865–1867 Mississippi Legislature	50	October 1865	December 1865	
1865–1867 Mississippi Legislature	51	October 1866	October 1866	
1865–1867 Mississippi Legislature	52	January 1867	February 1867	
Mississippi Constitution of 1868
1870–1872 Mississippi Legislature	53	January 1870	July 1870	
1870–1872 Mississippi Legislature	54	January 1871	May 1871	
1872–1874 Mississippi Legislature	55	January 1872	April 1872	
1872–1874 Mississippi Legislature	56	January 1873	April 1873	
1872–1874 Mississippi Legislature	57	October 1873	October 1873	
1874–1876 Mississippi Legislature	58	January 1874	April 1874	
1874–1876 Mississippi Legislature	59	December 1874	December 1874	
1874–1876 Mississippi Legislature	60	January 1875	March 1875	
1874–1876 Mississippi Legislature	61	July 1875	July 1875	
1876–1878 Mississippi Legislature	62	January 1876	April 1876	
1876–1878 Mississippi Legislature	63	January 1877	February 1877	
1878–1880 Mississippi Legislature	64	January 1878	March 1878	
1880–1882 Mississippi Legislature	65	January 1880	March 1880	
1882–1884 Mississippi Legislature	66	January 1882	March 1882	
1884–1886 Mississippi Legislature	67	January 1884	March 1884	
1886–1888 Mississippi Legislature	68	January 1886	March 1886	
1888–1890 Mississippi Legislature	69	January 1888	March 1888	
1890-1892 Mississippi Legislature	70	January 7, 1890	February 24, 1890	
Mississippi Constitution of 1890
1892–1896 Mississippi Legislature	71	January 5, 1892	April 2, 1892	
1892–1896 Mississippi Legislature	72	January 2, 1894	February 10, 1894	
1896–1900 Mississippi Legislature	73	January 7, 1896	March 24, 1896	
1896–1900 Mississippi Legislature	74	April 27, 1896	May 27, 1897	
1896–1900 Mississippi Legislature	75	January 4, 1898	February 11, 1898	
1900–1904 Mississippi Legislature	76	January 2, 1900	March 12, 1900	
1900–1904 Mississippi Legislature	77	January 7, 1902	March 5, 1902	
1904–1908 Mississippi Legislature	78	January 5, 1904	March 22, 1904	
1904–1908 Mississippi Legislature	79	January 2, 1906	April 21, 1906	
1908–1912 Mississippi Legislature	80	January 7, 1908	March 21, 1908	
1908–1912 Mississippi Legislature	81	January 4, 1910	April 16, 1910	
1908–1912 Mississippi Legislature	82	November 1, 1911	November 15, 1911	
1912–1916 Mississippi Legislature	83	January 2, 1912	March 16, 1912	
1912–1916 Mississippi Legislature	84	June 10, 1913	June 14, 1913	
1912–1916 Mississippi Legislature	85	January 6 1914	March 28, 1914	
1916–1920 Mississippi Legislature	86	January 1916	April 1916	
1916–1920 Mississippi Legislature	87	September 1917	October 1917	
1916–1920 Mississippi Legislature	88	January 1918	March 1918	
1920–1924 Mississippi Legislature	89	January 1920	April 1920	
1920–1924 Mississippi Legislature	90	January 1922	April 1922	
1924–1928 Mississippi Legislature	91	January 1924	April 1924	
1924–1928 Mississippi Legislature	92	January 1926	March 1926	
1928–1932 Mississippi Legislature	93	January 1928	April 1928	
1928–1932 Mississippi Legislature	94	October 1928	December 1928	
1928–1932 Mississippi Legislature	95	June 1929	September 1929	
1928–1932 Mississippi Legislature	96	January 1930	May 1930	
1928–1932 Mississippi Legislature	97	September 1931	October 1931	
1932–1936 Mississippi Legislature	98	January 1932	May 1932	
1932–1936 Mississippi Legislature	99	December 1932	December 1932	
1932–1936 Mississippi Legislature	100	January 1934	April 1934	
1932–1936 Mississippi Legislature	101	October 1935	December 1935	
1936–1940 Mississippi Legislature	102	January 1936	March 1936	
1936–1940 Mississippi Legislature	103	September 1936	September 1936	
1936–1940 Mississippi Legislature	104	November 1936	December 1936	
1936–1940 Mississippi Legislature	105	January 1938	April 1938	
1936–1940 Mississippi Legislature	106	July 1938	August 1938	
1940–1944 Mississippi Legislature	107	January 1940	May 1940	
1940–1944 Mississippi Legislature	108	January 6, 1942	March 23, 1942	
1944–1948 Mississippi Legislature	109	January 4, 1944	March 31, 1944	
1944–1948 Mississippi Legislature	110	November 2, 1944	November 3, 1944	
1944–1948 Mississippi Legislature	111	January 8, 1946	April 10, 1946	
1944–1948 Mississippi Legislature	112	March 4, 1947	March 15, 1947	
1944–1948 Mississippi Legislature	113	November 12, 1947	November 15, 1947	
1948–1952 Mississippi Legislature	114	January 6, 1948	April 14, 1948	
1948–1952 Mississippi Legislature	115	November 14, 1949	December 17, 1949	
1948–1952 Mississippi Legislature	116	January 3, 1950	April 20, 1950	
1952–1956 Mississippi Legislature	117	January 8, 1952	April 17, 1952	
1952–1956 Mississippi Legislature	118	November 3, 1953	December 28, 1953	
1952–1956 Mississippi Legislature	119	January 5, 1954	May 6, 1954	
1952–1956 Mississippi Legislature	120	September 7, 1954	September 30, 1954	
1952–1956 Mississippi Legislature	121	January 11, 1955	April 7, 1955	
1956–1960 Mississippi Legislature	122	January 3, 1956	April 6, 1956	
1956–1960 Mississippi Legislature	123	November 5, 1957	December 14, 1957	
1956–1960 Mississippi Legislature	124	January 7, 1958	May 10, 1958	
1956–1960 Mississippi Legislature	125	December 2, 1959	December 24, 1959	
1960–1964 Mississippi Legislature	126	January 5, 1960	May 11, 1960	
1960–1964 Mississippi Legislature	127	August 23, 1961	August 25, 1961	
1960–1964 Mississippi Legislature	128	October 17, 1961	October 21, 1961	
1960–1964 Mississippi Legislature	129	January 2, 1962	June 2, 1962	
1960–1964 Mississippi Legislature	130	September 18, 1962	October 6, 1962	
1960–1964 Mississippi Legislature	131	November 13, 1962	December 21, 1962	
1960–1964 Mississippi Legislature	132	February 25, 1963	March 2, 1963	
1964–1968 Mississippi Legislature	133	January 7, 1964	June 12, 1964	
1964–1968 Mississippi Legislature	134	June 23, 1964	July 15, 1964	
1964–1968 Mississippi Legislature	135	June 14, 1965	July 10, 1965	
1964–1968 Mississippi Legislature		January 4, 1966	June 17, 1966	
1964–1968 Mississippi Legislature		November 9, 1966	January 6, 1967	
1964–1968 Mississippi Legislature		June 20, 1967	June 30, 1967	
1968–1972 Mississippi Legislature		January 2, 1968	August 9, 1968	
1968–1972 Mississippi Legislature		July 22, 1969	October 11, 1969	
1968–1972 Mississippi Legislature		January 6, 1970	April 6, 1970	
1968–1972 Mississippi Legislature		January 5, 1971	April 5, 1971	
1972–1976 Mississippi Legislature		January 4, 1972	May 9, 1972	
1972–1976 Mississippi Legislature		January 2, 1973	April 1973	
1972–1976 Mississippi Legislature		January 8, 1974	April 7, 1974	
1972–1976 Mississippi Legislature		January 7, 1975	April 6, 1975	
1976–1980 Mississippi Legislature		January 6, 1976	May 9, 1976	
1976–1980 Mississippi Legislature		June 18, 1976	June 20, 1976	
1976–1980 Mississippi Legislature		January 4, 1977	April 3, 1977	
1976–1980 Mississippi Legislature		August 12, 1977	August 13, 1977	
1976–1980 Mississippi Legislature		January 3, 1978	April 7, 1978	
1976–1980 Mississippi Legislature		January 2, 1979	April 1, 1979	
1976–1980 Mississippi Legislature		May 1, 1979	May 3, 1979	
1980–1984 Mississippi Legislature		January 8, 1980	May 11, 1980	
1980–1984 Mississippi Legislature		January 6, 1981	April 8, 1981	
1980–1984 Mississippi Legislature		August 25, 1981	August 27, 1981	
1980–1984 Mississippi Legislature		January 5, 1982	April 10, 1982	
1980–1984 Mississippi Legislature		December 6, 1982	December 21, 1982	
1980–1984 Mississippi Legislature		January 4, 1983	April 21, 1983	
1980–1984 Mississippi Legislature		June 24, 1983	June 24, 1983	
1980–1984 Mississippi Legislature		November 16, 1983	November 19, 1983	
1984–1988 Mississippi Legislature		January 3, 1984	May 15, 1984	
1984–1988 Mississippi Legislature		June 25, 1984	June 27, 1984	
1984–1988 Mississippi Legislature		January 8, 1985	April 11, 1985	
1984–1988 Mississippi Legislature		January 7, 1986	April 15, 1986	
1984–1988 Mississippi Legislature		May 28, 1986	June 1, 1986	
1984–1988 Mississippi Legislature		January 6, 1987	April 5, 1987	
1984–1988 Mississippi Legislature		August 27, 1987	August 29, 1987	
1988–1992 Mississippi Legislature		January 5, 1988	May 8, 1988	
1988–1992 Mississippi Legislature		August 10, 1988	August 16, 1988	
1988–1992 Mississippi Legislature		January 3, 1989	April 10, 1989	
1988–1992 Mississippi Legislature		April 17, 1989	April 19, 1989	
1988–1992 Mississippi Legislature		January 2, 1990	April 14, 1990	
1988–1992 Mississippi Legislature		June 18, 1990	June 30, 1990	
1988–1992 Mississippi Legislature		January 8, 1991	May 6, 1991	
1988–1992 Mississippi Legislature		December 18, 1991	December 20, 1991	
1992 Mississippi Legislature		January 7, 1992	May 12, 1992	
1992 Mississippi Legislature		September 16, 1992	September 16, 1992	
1993–1996 Mississippi Legislature		January 5, 1993	April 4, 1993	
1993–1996 Mississippi Legislature		January 4, 1994	April 3, 1994	
1993–1996 Mississippi Legislature		August 15, 1994	August 23, 1994	
1993–1996 Mississippi Legislature		January 3, 1995	April 11, 1995	
1996–2000 Mississippi Legislature		January 2, 1996	April 19, 1996	
1996–2000 Mississippi Legislature		July 11, 1996	July 11, 1996	
1996–2000 Mississippi Legislature		October 11, 1996	October 11, 1996	
1996–2000 Mississippi Legislature		January 7, 1997	April 10, 1997	
1996–2000 Mississippi Legislature		April 23, 1997	April 23, 1997	
1996–2000 Mississippi Legislature		January 6, 1998	April 5, 1998	
1996–2000 Mississippi Legislature		January 4, 1999	April 4, 1999	
1996–2000 Mississippi Legislature		July 22, 1999	July 22, 1999	
2000–2004 Mississippi Legislature		January 4, 2000	May 7, 2000	
2000–2004 Mississippi Legislature		June 29, 2000	June 29, 2000	
2000–2004 Mississippi Legislature		August 28, 2000	August 28, 2000	
2000–2004 Mississippi Legislature		August 30, 2000	August 30, 2000	
2000–2004 Mississippi Legislature		November 6, 2000	November 6, 2000	
2000–2004 Mississippi Legislature		January 2, 2001	March 30, 2000	
2000–2004 Mississippi Legislature		July 23, 2001	July 23, 2001	
2000–2004 Mississippi Legislature		November 1, 2001	November 7, 2001	
2000–2004 Mississippi Legislature		January 8, 2002	April 12, 2002	
2000–2004 Mississippi Legislature		June 21, 2002	June 21, 2002	
2000–2004 Mississippi Legislature		July 30, 2002	July 30, 2002	
2000–2004 Mississippi Legislature		September 5, 2002	November 26, 2002	
2000–2004 Mississippi Legislature		January 7, 2003	April 16, 2003	
2004–2008 Mississippi Legislature		January 6, 2004	May 9, 2004	2003 Mississippi elections
2004–2008 Mississippi Legislature		May 19, 2004	June 30, 2004	2003 Mississippi elections
2004–2008 Mississippi Legislature		November 8, 2004	November 22, 2004	2003 Mississippi elections
2004–2008 Mississippi Legislature		January 4, 2005	April 5, 2005	2003 Mississippi elections
2004–2008 Mississippi Legislature		March 12, 2005	March 13, 2005	2003 Mississippi elections
2004–2008 Mississippi Legislature		May 18, 2005	May 27, 2005	2003 Mississippi elections
2004–2008 Mississippi Legislature		June 28, 2005	July 2, 2005	2003 Mississippi elections
2004–2008 Mississippi Legislature		July 15, 2005	July 15, 2005	2003 Mississippi elections
2004–2008 Mississippi Legislature		January 3, 2006	April 25, 2006	2003 Mississippi elections
2004–2008 Mississippi Legislature		August 24, 2006	September 13, 2006	2003 Mississippi elections
2004–2008 Mississippi Legislature		October 5, 2006	October 5, 2006	2003 Mississippi elections
2004–2008 Mississippi Legislature		January 2, 2007	April 25, 2007	2003 Mississippi elections
2004–2008 Mississippi Legislature		April 27, 2007	May 18, 2007	2003 Mississippi elections
2008–2012 Mississippi Legislature		January 8, 2008	May 12, 2008	2007 Mississippi elections
2008–2012 Mississippi Legislature		May 21, 2008	August 21, 2008	2007 Mississippi elections
2008–2012 Mississippi Legislature		January 6, 2009	June 3, 2009	2007 Mississippi elections
2008–2012 Mississippi Legislature		May 7, 2009	May 7, 2009	2007 Mississippi elections
2008–2012 Mississippi Legislature		June 2, 2009	June 30, 2009	2007 Mississippi elections
2008–2012 Mississippi Legislature		July 10, 2009	July 10, 2009	2007 Mississippi elections
2008–2012 Mississippi Legislature		January 5, 2010	April 28, 2010	2007 Mississippi elections
2008–2012 Mississippi Legislature		January 4, 2011	April 7, 2011	2007 Mississippi elections
2012–2016 Mississippi Legislature		January 3, 2012	May 3, 2012	November 2011
2012–2016 Mississippi Legislature		January 8, 2013	April 4, 2013	November 2011
2012–2016 Mississippi Legislature		April 26, 2013	April 26, 2013	November 2011
2012–2016 Mississippi Legislature		June 27, 2013	June 27, 2013	November 2011
2012–2016 Mississippi Legislature		January 7, 2014	April 6, 2014	November 2011
2012–2016 Mississippi Legislature		April 2, 2014	April 2, 2014	November 2011
2012–2016 Mississippi Legislature		May 8, 2014	May 8, 2014	November 2011
2012–2016 Mississippi Legislature		January 6, 2015	April 5, 2015	November 2011
2016–2020 Mississippi Legislature		January 5, 2016	April 24, 2016	November 2015
2016–2020 Mississippi Legislature		February 4, 2016	February 4, 2016	November 2015
2016–2020 Mississippi Legislature		June 28, 2016	June 29, 2016	November 2015
2016–2020 Mississippi Legislature		January 3, 2017	April 2, 2017	November 2015
2016–2020 Mississippi Legislature		January 2, 2018	March 28, 2018	November 2015
2016–2020 Mississippi Legislature		August 23, 2018	August 23, 2018	November 2015
2016–2020 Mississippi Legislature		January 8, 2019	March 29, 2019	November 2015
2020–2024 Mississippi Legislature		January 7, 2020	October 10, 2020	November 2019
2020–2024 Mississippi Legislature		January 5, 2021	April 1, 2021	November 2019
2024–2028 Mississippi Legislature		January 2024		November 2023: House, Senate

== See also ==
- List of former members of the Mississippi State Senate
- List of speakers of the Mississippi House of Representatives
- List of presidents pro tempore of the Mississippi State Senate
- List of governors of Mississippi
- Politics of Mississippi
- Elections in Mississippi
- Mississippi State Capitol
- Historical outline of Mississippi
- Lists of United States state legislative sessions
