= 9th Mississippi Legislature =

1826 legislative session

←	8th Mississippi Legislature	10th Mississippi Legislature	→

Overview
- Legislative body: Mississippi Legislature
- Jurisdiction: Mississippi, United States
- Term: January 2, 1826 – January 31, 1826

Mississippi State Senate
- President: Gerard C. Brandon
- President pro tempore: Thomas Freeland

Mississippi House of Representatives
- Speaker: Isaac R. Nicholson

Sessions
- 1st: January 2, 1826 – January 31, 1826

The 9th Mississippi Legislature met from January 2, 1826 to January 31, 1826, in Jackson, Mississippi. It was composed of the Mississippi State Senate and the Mississippi House of Representatives. Some senators and all representatives were elected in August 1825.

== Senate ==
As the Gerard Brandon, the Lieutenant Governor (Senate President) was Acting Governor when the term started, Thomas Freeland was elected as the Senate's President Pro Tempore. On January 7, 1826, David Holmes was sworn in as Governor, allowing Brandon to resume his role as Lieutenant Governor and ex officio President of the Senate. Non-senators William H. Chaille and Joseph Pierce were elected Senate's Secretary and Door-Keeper respectively.

County District	Senator Name	Year Elected
Adams	Fountain Winston	1825
Adams	Adam L. Bingaman	1823
Warren, Claiborne	Thomas Freeland	1823
Pike, Marion	Wiley P. Harris	1824
Hinds, Jefferson, Copiah, Yazoo	Hardin D. Runnels	1824
Lawrence	Charles Lynch	1824
Amite, Franklin	Charles C. Slocumb	1825
Jackson, Hancock, Green, Perry	John McLeod	1825
Wayne, Covington, Monroe	William Dowsing	1825
Wilkinson	Abram M. Scott	1825

== House ==
Isaac R. Nicholson was elected Speaker of the House. Non-representatives James Phillips Jr. and Dillard Collins were elected Clerk and Door-Keeper respectively.

County	Representative Name
Adams	Benjamin L. C. Wailes
Adams (Natchez)	Charles B. Green
Amite	Francis Graves
Amite	Soloman Weathersby
Amite	Edmund Smith
Claiborne	William Briscoe
Claiborne	David Dickson
Copiah	Isaac R. Nicholson
Covington	Joseph McAfee
Franklin	Thomas Cotton
Franklin	James C. Hawley
Green	Archibald McManus
Hancock	Thomas Holmes
Hinds	William Walker
Jackson	John McDonald
Jefferson	Malcolm Gilchrist
Jefferson	John L. Irwin
Lawrence	Harman Runnels
Lawrence	Joseph Cooper
Lawrence	Reuben Collins
Marion	Merry Bracy
Monroe	Robert D. Haden
Perry	J. J. H. Morris
Pike	William Dickson
Pike	David Cleveland
Pike	Vincent Garner
Simpson	William Tullus
Warren	Henry N. Vick
Wayne	Thomas S. Sterling
Wayne	John H. Horne
Wilkinson	William Haile
Wilkinson	Cotesworth P. Smith
Wilkinson	William L. Brandon
Yazoo	Lindsey C. Hall
