= 8th Mississippi Legislature =

1825 legislative session

| ← | 7th Mississippi Legislature | 9th Mississippi Legislature | → |

Overview
- Legislative body: Mississippi Legislature
- Jurisdiction: Mississippi, United States
- Term: January 3, 1825 – February 4, 1825

Mississippi State Senate
- President: Gerard C. Brandon
- President pro tempore: Bartley C. Barry

Mississippi House of Representatives
- Speaker: Cowles Mead

Sessions
- 1st: January 3, 1825 – February 4, 1825

The 8th Mississippi Legislature met from January 3, 1825 to February 4, 1825 in Jackson, Mississippi.

== Senate ==
In August 1824, elections were held for some of the Senate districts. Lieutenant governor Gerard C. Brandon served ex officio as the President of the Senate. Due to his absence on January 3 (the first day of the session), Bartley C. Barry was elected Senate President pro tempore for that day. Non-senator William H. Chaille was elected Secretary of the Senate. The Senate adjourned on February 1, 1825.

| County District | Senator Name | Year Elected |
|---|---|---|
| Adams | Adam L. Bingaman | 1823 |
| Adams (City of Natchez) | James Foster | 1824 |
| Wilkinson | John Joor | 1823 |
| Warren, Claiborne | Thomas Freeland | 1823 |
| Pike, Marion | Wiley P. Harris | 1824 |
| Jackson, Hancock, Green, Perry | McLaughlin McKay | 1822 |
| Lawrence | Charles Lynch | 1824 |
| Wayne, Covington, Monroe | Bartley C. Barry | 1822 |
| Amite, Franklin | John Browne | 1822 |
| Hinds, Jefferson, Copiah, Simpson, Yazoo | Hardin D. Runnels | 1824 |

== House ==
Cowles Mead was elected Speaker of the House. Non-representatives Peter A. Van Dorn and Dillard Collins were elected Clerk and Door-keeper respectively. The House adjourned on February 4, 1825.

| County | Representative Name |
|---|---|
| Adams | George Dougherty |
| Adams | Benjamin L. C. Wailes |
| Adams (Natchez) | Fountain Winston |
| Amite | Richard Hurst |
| Amite | Francis Graves |
| Amite | Solomon Weathersby |
| Claiborne | David D. Downing |
| Claiborne | Daniel Burnet |
| Copiah | Isaac R. Nicholson |
| Covington | Joseph Macafee |
| Franklin | Thomas K. Pickett |
| Franklin | Charles C. Slocumb |
| Hancock | Samuel White |
| Hancock | Daniel Burnett |
| Hinds | Charles M. Lawson |
| Jackson | Thomas Bilbo |
| Jefferson | Malcolm Gilchrist |
| Jefferson | Cowles Mead |
| Lawrence | Joseph Cooper |
| Lawrence | John Tomlinson |
| Lawrence | James H. Bull |
| Marion | Merry Bracey |
| Monroe | Christopher H. Williams |
| Perry | Jacob J. H. Morris |
| Pike | David Cleveland |
| Pike | Peter Quinn Jr. |
| Pike | Nathaniel Wells |
| Simpson | Stephen Howell |
| Warren | James Gibson |
| Wayne | Edward Gray |
| Wayne | William Patton |
| Wilkinson | Joseph Johnson |
| Wilkinson | Edward McGehee |
| Wilkinson | William Haile |
| Yazoo | Andrew E. Beaty |
