= 4th Mississippi Legislature =

1821 legislative session

←	3rd Mississippi Legislature	5th Mississippi Legislature	→

Overview
- Legislative body: Mississippi Legislature
- Jurisdiction: Mississippi, United States
- Meeting place: Natchez, Mississippi
- Term: January 1, 1821 – February 12, 1821

Mississippi State Senate
- President: James Patton
- President pro tempore: Thomas Torrence

Mississippi House of Representatives
- Speaker: Beverly R. Grayson

The 4th Mississippi Legislature met from January 1, 1821, to February 12, 1821, in Natchez, Mississippi.

== Senate ==
The Mississippi State Senate was composed of the following. James Patton, the lieutenant governor of Mississippi, served ex officio as the president of the Senate. Thomas A. Willis was elected Secretary of the Senate, and J. Lowry was elected Door-Keeper. On January 15, 1821, Thomas Torrence was elected president pro tempore of the Senate.

County District	Senator Name
Adams	Joseph Sessions
Adams	Charles B. Green
Amite	Thomas Torrence
Wilkinson	John Joor
Warren, Claiborne	William Willis
Pike, Marion	David Dickson
Jefferson, Franklin	Cowles Mead
Lawrence, Covington, Wayne	Howell W. Runnels
Jackson, Hancock, Green, Perry	Isaac R. Nicholson

== House ==
The Mississippi House of Representatives was composed of the following. Beverly R. Grayson was elected Speaker of the House. Non-representatives Peter A. Vandorn and James R. Whitney were elected to the offices of clerk and door keeper, respectively.

County	Representative
Adams	Samuel L. Winston
Adams	Beverly R. Grayson
Adams	Samuel Montgomery
Adams (Natchez)	James Foster
Amite	Richard Hurst
Amite	John Burton
Amite	Wilie Jackson
Claiborne	Henry G. Johnson
Claiborne	Thomas Freeland
Covington	Garven Harris
Franklin	Bailey E. Chaney
Franklin	Thomas Cotton
Hancock	Noel Jourdan
Jackson	Thomas Bilbo
Jefferson	Isaac N. Selser
Jefferson	William B. Blanton
Lawrence	Thomas Anderson
Lawrence	Arthur Fox
Marion	Francis B. Lenoir
Perry	R. H. Gilmer
Perry	Hugh McDonald
Pike	William Dickson
Pike	James Robinson
Pike	Vincent Gardner
Warren	Francis Griffin
Wayne	Josiah Watts
Wilkinson	Gerard C. Brandon
Wilkinson	William A. Richardson
Wilkinson	William Yerby
