= 17th Mississippi Legislature =

←	16th Mississippi Legislature	1836–1838 Mississippi Legislature	→

Overview
- Legislative body: Mississippi Legislature
- Jurisdiction: Mississippi, United States
- Meeting place: Jackson, Mississippi
- Term: November 18, 1833 – January 30, 1835

Mississippi State Senate
- President: Parmenas Briscoe

Mississippi House of Representatives
- Speaker: Adam L. Bingaman

Sessions
- 1st: November 18, 1833 – December 25, 1833
- 2nd: January 19, 1835 – January 30, 1835

The 17th Mississippi Legislature met in two sessions: a regular session between November 18, 1833 and December 25, 1833; and a called session between January 19, 1835, and January 30, 1835.

== History ==
This was the first of the two-year legislative terms as ordered by Mississippi's 1832 constitution. Elections were held on the first Monday of May in 1833.

== Senate ==
Parmenas Briscoe was elected President of the Senate. John P. Gilbert was elected Secretary and Major Craft was elected Door-Keeper.

County District	Senator Name
Adams	Fountain Winston (Regular)
Adams	John A. Quitman (Called)
Wilkinson	John Henderson (Called)
Pike, Marion	Jesse Harper
Amite, Franklin	David Davis
Claiborne	Parmenas Briscoe
Copiah, Jefferson	Solomon Tracey
Hinds	Silas Brown
Monroe, Lowndes, Rankin	Stephen Cocke
Wayne, Greene, Jackson, Hancock, Jones, Perry	Thomas S. Sterling (Regular)
Wayne, Greene, Jackson, Hancock, Jones, Perry	Thomas P. Falconer (Called)
Warren, Washington	Eugene Magee
Lawrence, Simpson, Covington	Richard A. Hargis
Yazoo, Madison, Holmes	Thomas Land (Called)

== House ==
Adam L. Bingaman was elected Speaker, defeating Russell Williamson. Several new members were elected for the Called Session. These included representatives from new state counties.

County	Representative Nam (Main Session)	Representative Name (Called Session)
Adams	Adam L. Bingaman	
Adams	William Vannerson	
Amite	William Van Norman	
Amite	Morgan Davis	
Carroll		Greenwood Leflore
Choctaw		William Peery
Claiborne	James H. Maury	
Claiborne	Thomas M. Newell	
Clark		Samuel K. Lewis
Copiah	Buckner Harris	
Copiah	John Beesley	Seth Granberry
Covington	Thomas H. Hopkins	
Franklin	Robert Anderson	
Green	David McRae	Allen McCaskill
Hancock	Burwell B. Brewer	
Hinds	A. Albert Allen	Thomas H. Williams
Hinds	William C. Demoss	
Holmes	James C. Bole	William W. George
Jackson	Allen McLendon	
Jasper		John C. Thomas
Jefferson	Thomas H. Watkins	Malcolm Gilchrist
Jefferson	Joseph Dunbar	
Kemper		Francis Thomas
Lauderdale		Samuel Dale
Lawrence	Samuel Jayne	
Lawrence	Samuel Hunter	Major Newton
Leake		Henry Harper
Lowndes	Tilghman M. Tucker	
Marion	Charles D. Learned	
Madison	Russel M. Williamson	David M. Fulton
Monroe	Samuel J. Gholson	
Neshoba		James Ellis
Noxubee		Thomas D. Wooldridge
Oktibbeha		Henry Gibson
Perry	James Carpenter	
Pike	Charles C. Cage	Franklin Love
Pike	James Y. McNabb	
Rankin	Oliver C. Dease	
Scott		Jeremiah B. White
Simpson	Charles K. Brown	
Smith		Emanuel A. Durr
Tallahatchie		Charles Bowen
Warren	William Vick	
Washington	Robert P. Shelby	
Wayne	John Watts	Alfred Brown
Wilkinson	Gordon D. Boyd	
Wilkinson	John W. Gildart	
Winston		Jesse M. Field
Yalobusha		Robert Edrington
Yazoo	John M. Sharp	
Yazoo	John Alston	
