= 13th Mississippi Legislature =

1830 legislative session

←	12th Mississippi Legislature	14th Mississippi Legislature	→

Overview
- Legislative body: Mississippi Legislature
- Jurisdiction: Mississippi, United States
- Meeting place: Jackson, Mississippi
- Term: January 4, 1830 – February 13, 1830

Mississippi State Senate
- President: Abram M. Scott

Mississippi House of Representatives
- Speaker: Joseph Dunbar

The 13th Mississippi Legislature met in Jackson from January 4, 1830, to February 13, 1830.

== Senate ==
Lieutenant Governor A. M. Scott served ex officio as President of the Senate. Non-senators Thomas A. Willis and Joseph Pearce were elected Secretary and Door-Keeper respectively, The Senate adjourned on February 13, 1830.

County District	Senator Name
Adams	Fountain Winston
Wilkinson	C. P. Smith
Pike, Marion	David Cleaveland
Jackson, Hancock, Green, Perry	John McLeod
Amite, Franklin	Willie Jackson
Monroe	James F. Trotter
Claiborne	Parmenas Briscoe
Copiah, Jefferson	Benjamin Kennedy
Wayne, Covington, Jones	Thomas S. Sterling
Lawrence, Simpson	Joseph Cooper
Hinds, Rankin, Madison, Yazoo, Washington, Warren	Henry W. Vick

== House ==
Joseph Dunbar was elected Speaker of the House. Non-representatives John H. Mallory and Dillard Collins were elected Clerk and Door-Keeper respectively. The House adjourned on February 12, 1830.

County	Representative Name
Adams	John F. H. Claiborne
Adams	Robert F. Dunbar
Amite	Francis Graves
Amite	David Pemble
Claiborne	Samuel R. Montgomery
Claiborne	Adam Gordon
Copiah	Seth Granberry
Copiah	Ephraim G. Peyton
Covington	Hanson Alsbury
Franklin	Richard W. Webber
Franklin	John Cameron
Green	Alexander Morrison
Hancock	William Haile
Hinds	Hiram G. Runnels
Jackson	John McDonald
Jefferson	Joseph Dunbar
Jefferson	N. L. Boulden
Jones	Samuel Ellis
Lawrence	Walter W. New
Lawrence	Arthur Fox
Marion	William Lott
Madison	James R. Marsh
Monroe	George Higgason
Monroe	Samuel Ragsdale
Monroe	John Bell
Perry	John Barefield
Pike	A. P. Cunningham
Pike	Simeon P. Shope
Rankin	Nehemiah McGee
Simpson	Mr. Plummer
Warren	Albert G. Creath
Washington	P. A. Gilbert
Wayne	John H. Horne
Wilkinson	Edward F. Farish
Wilkinson	M. F. DeGraffenreid
Yazoo	Thomas Land
