= 15th Mississippi Legislature =

←	14th Mississippi Legislature	16th Mississippi Legislature	→

Overview
- Legislative body: Mississippi Legislature
- Jurisdiction: Mississippi, United States
- Meeting place: Jackson, Mississippi
- Term: November 21, 1831 – December 20, 1831

Mississippi State Senate
- President: Abram M. Scott

Mississippi House of Representatives
- Speaker: M. F. DeGraffenreid

The 15th Mississippi Legislature met between November 21, 1831, and December 20, 1831, in Jackson, Mississippi.

== Senate ==
Parmenas Briscoe was elected President pro Tempore. John P. Gilbert was elected Secretary of the Senate, and Joseph Pierce was elected Door-Keeper.

County District	Senator Name
Adams	Robert T. Dunbar
Wilkinson	Cotesworth Pinckney Smith
Pike, Marion	William Clinton Cage
Amite, Franklin	Willie Jackson
Claiborne	Parmenas Briscoe
Copiah, Jefferson	Benjamin Kennedy
Hinds	Isaac Caldwell
Monroe, Lowndes, Rankin	James F. Trotter
Wayne, Greene, Jackson, Hancock, Jones, Perry	Thomas S. Sterling
Warren, Washington	John I. Guion
Yazoo, Madison	Thomas Land
Lawrence, Simpson, Covington	A. M. Keegan

== House ==
M. F. DeGraffenreid was elected Speaker, defeating Charles B. Green in a 31-3 vote. John H.. Mallory was elected Clerk, and Lewis Whitesides was elected Door-Keeper.

County	Representative Name
Adams	John F. H. Claiborne
Adams	Adam L. Bingaman
Amite	Edmund Smith
Amite	David Pemble
Claiborne	Benjamin F. Stockton
Claiborne	James H. Maury
Copiah	Daniel B. Egan
Copiah	Seth Granberry
Covington	Morgan McAfee
Franklin	Richard W. Webber
Green	David McRae
Hancock	Elihu Carver
Hinds	Jeremiah Conant
Hinds	James Scott
Jackson	John McDonald
Jefferson	Armstead B. Bradford
Jefferson	John L. Irwin
Jones	Samuel Ellis
Lawrence	Samuel Benson
Lawrence	George Granberry
Lowndes	Tilman M. Tucker
Marion	William M. Rankin
Madison	Charles B. Green
Monroe	George Higgason
Perry	George D. Gaines
Pike	John Gwin
Pike	Franklin Love
Rankin	Thomas J. Coffee
Simpson	Frederick Carr
Warren	Gideon Gibson
Washington	Claudius Gibson
Wayne	John A. Edwards
Wilkinson	M. F. DeGraffenreid
Wilkinson	George H. Gordon
Yazoo	Richard Sparks
Yazoo	William M. Walton
