= David Pemble =

American politician (c. 1790–1869)

12th Speaker of the Mississippi House of Representatives
- In office January 7, 1833 – March 2, 1833
- Preceded by: M. F. DeGraffenreid
- Succeeded by: A. L. Bingaman

Member of the Mississippi House of Representatives from the Amite County district
- In office November 21, 1831 – January 7, 1833
- In office January 4, 1830 – February 12, 1830

Personal details
- Born: 1790 or 1791 South Carolina, U. S.
- Died: 1869 (aged 78) Texas, U. S.
- Party: Democratic-Republican

David Pemble (1790 or 1791 – 1869) was an American politician and farmer who represented Amite County in the Mississippi House of Representatives in the early 1830 including as the 12th Speaker of the Mississippi House of Representatives during the 16th Session from January to March 1833.

== Early life ==
David Pemble was born in South Carolina. He moved to Amite County, Mississippi, on horseback in 1825.

== Career ==
After moving to Amite County, Pemble taught school for several years. Pemble was elected to represent Amite County in the Mississippi House of Representatives for the 13th Mississippi Legislature in early 1830. Pemble was re-elected to the House again for the 15th Mississippi Legislature in late 1831. In December 1832, Pemble was re-elected to the House for the 16th Mississippi Legislature, which lasted from January 7, 1833 to March 2, 1833. During this session, Pemble was elected Speaker of the House over Joseph Dunbar, Adam L. Bingaman, and A. M. Keehan, in the 15th ballot. In August 1835, Pemble was a candidate for Governor of Mississippi. In November 1838, he chaired an Amite County States' Rights Party meeting. After leaving politics he continued farming in Amite County. He later moved to Texas to live with his daughter. He died in Texas in 1869, aged 78.

=== Political views ===
Pemble was a Jeffersonian Democrat and a supporter of states' rights. Pemble was "a great admirer" of John C. Calhoun. He voted for Henry Clay and William Henry Harrison.

== Personal life ==
Pemble married Emily Gerald, who had moved to Mississippi during childhood in 1811. They had three children: Thomas W., Emily E., and Robert J. (born July 31, 1833). Mrs. Pemble died when Robert was a year old.
