= 16th Mississippi Legislature =

←	15th Mississippi Legislature	17th Mississippi Legislature	→

Overview
- Legislative body: Mississippi Legislature
- Jurisdiction: Mississippi, United States
- Meeting place: Jackson, Mississippi
- Term: January 7, 1833 – March 2, 1833

Mississippi State Senate
- President: Charles Lynch

Mississippi House of Representatives
- Speaker: David Pemble

Sessions
- 1st: January 7, 1833 – March 2, 1833

The 16th Mississippi Legislature met between January 7, 1833, and March 2, 1833, in Jackson, Mississippi.

== History ==
This legislature was the last under Mississippi's original state constitution. Elections were held in December 1832. The legislature published a resolve against nullification and in support of President Andrew Jackson.

== Senate ==
Charles Lynch was elected President of the Senate. David Dickson was elected Secretary and Joseph Pierce was elected Door-Keeper.

County District	Senator Name
Adams	Fountain Winston
Wilkinson	Thomas H. Prosser
Pike, Marion	Franklin Love
Amite, Franklin	Archibald Smith
Claiborne	Adam Gordon
Copiah, Jefferson	Buckner Harris
Hinds	J. B. Morgan
Monroe, Lowndes, Rankin	George Higgason
Wayne, Greene, Jackson, Hancock, Jones, Perry	John McLeod
Warren, Washington	John I. Guion
Yazoo, Madison	David Ford
Lawrence, Simpson, Covington	Charles Lynch

== House ==
David Pemble was elected Speaker in fifteen ballots, over Joseph Dunbar, Adam L. Bingaman, and A. M. Keehan. John H. Mallory was elected Clerk and Lewis Whiteside was elected Door-Keeper.

County	Representative Name
Adams	Adam L. Bingaman
Adams	William Vannerson
Amite	David Pemble
Amite	William Vannorman
Claiborne	John A. Barnes
Claiborne	Benjamin F. Stockton
Copiah	Barnabas Allen
Copiah	John Beasley
Covington	Elam S. Ragan
Franklin	Orin Shurtleff
Green	David McRae
Hancock	Burwell B. Brewer
Hinds	William C. Demoss
Hinds	Alexander Morrison
Jackson	John McDonald
Jefferson	Philip Dickson
Jefferson	Joseph Dunbar
Jones	Samuel Ellis
Lawrence	Aloysius M. Keegan
Lowndes	Tilghman M. Tucker
Marion	Charles D. Learned
Madison	Andrew E. Batie
Monroe	John Bell
Perry	Abner Carter
Pike	Jesse Harper
Pike	William G. Martin
Rankin	Nathan G. Howard
Simpson	James Powel
Warren	William Vick
Washington	Robert P. Shelby
Wayne	John A. Edwards
Wilkinson	Gordon G. Boyd
Wilkinson	Francis R. Richardson
Yazoo	David Vance
Yazoo	James C. Bole
