= 12th Mississippi Legislature =

1829 legislative session

←	11th Mississippi Legislature	13th Mississippi Legislature	→

Overview
- Legislative body: Mississippi Legislature
- Jurisdiction: Mississippi, United States
- Meeting place: Jackson, Mississippi
- Term: January 5, 1829 – February 6, 1829

Mississippi State Senate
- President: Abram M. Scott

Mississippi House of Representatives
- Speaker: William L. Sharkey

The 12th Mississippi Legislature met in Jackson from January 5, 1829 to February 6, 1829.

== Senate ==
As the incumbent lieutenant governor, A. M. Scott served as the ex officio President of the Senate. Non-senators David Gordon and Joseph Pearce were elected Clerk and Door-Keeper respectively.

County District	Senator Name
Adams	Fountain Winston
Wilkinson	Joseph Johnson
Pike, Marion	Wiley P. Harris
Jackson, Hancock, Green, Perry	John McLeod
Amite, Franklin	Willie Jackson
Monroe	James F. Trotter
Claiborne	Thomas Freeland
Copiah, Jefferson	John L. Irwin
Wayne, Covington, Jones	Hamilton Cooper
Lawrence, Simpson	Joseph Cooper
Hinds, Rankin, Madison, Yazoo, Washington, Warren	Henry W. Vick

== House ==
William L. Sharkey was elected Speaker, defeating David Cleveland in a 19-16 vote. James Cornell was elected Clerk of the House. Dillard Collins was elected Door-Keeper.

County	Representative Name
Adams	Charles B. Green
Adams	Duncan S. Walker
Amite	Samuel B. Marsh
Amite	Francis Graves
Claiborne	Parmenas Briscoe
Claiborne	Thomas Gale
Copiah	William N. Miller
Copiah	Benjamin Kennedy
Covington	John Colbert
Franklin	David D. Gibson
Franklin	Lewis Magee
Green	Archibald McMannus
Hancock	P. Rutullius R. Pray
Hinds	John B. Peyton
Jackson	Thomas Bilbo
Jefferson	Nathan L. Boulden
Jefferson	Philip Dixon
Jones	Samuel Ellis
Lawrence	Walter W. New
Lawrence	A. M. Kegan
Marion	David Ford
Madison	James R. Marsh
Monroe	Robert Edrington
Monroe	Daniel W. Wright
Monroe	Samuel Ragsdale
Perry	Abner Carter
Pike	David Cleveland
Pike	Richard Davidson
Rankin	Alexander Chisholm
Simpson	Franklin E. Plummer
Warren	William L. Sharkey
Washington	P. A. Gilbert
Wayne	John H. Horne
Wilkinson	M. F. Degraffenreid
Wilkinson	Jacob Chambers
Yazoo	Richard Sparks
