= 11th Mississippi Legislature =

1828 legislative session

←	10th Mississippi Legislature	12th Mississippi Legislature	→

Overview
- Legislative body: Mississippi Legislature
- Jurisdiction: Mississippi, United States
- Meeting place: Jackson, Mississippi
- Term: January 7, 1828 – February 26, 1828

Mississippi State Senate
- President pro tempore: William Dowsing

Mississippi House of Representatives
- Speaker: Charles B. Green

The 11th Mississippi Legislature met in Jackson, Mississippi, from January 7, 1828, to February 16, 1828.

== Senate ==
William Dowsing served as president pro tempore of the Senate. Non-senator David Dickson served as secretary. The Senate adjourned on January 30, 1828.

County District	Senator Name
Adams	Fountain Winston
Wilkinson	Joseph Johnson
Pike, Marion	Wiley P. Harris
Jackson, Hancock, Green, Perry	John McLeod
Amite, Franklin	Thomas Torrence
Monroe	William Dowsing
Claiborne	Thomas Freeland
Copiah, Jefferson	John L. Irwin
Wayne, Covington, Jones	Hamilton Cooper
Lawrence, Simpson	Charles Lynch
Warren, Yazoo, Hinds, Washington	Henry W. Vick

== House ==
Charles B. Green was elected Speaker of the House. Non-representatives James Phillips Jr. and Dillard Collins were elected Clerk and Door-Keeper respectively. The House adjourned on February 26, 1828.

County	Representative Name
Adams	John A. Quitman
Adams	Charles B. Green
Amite	Samuel B. Marsh
Amite	Edmond Smith
Claiborne	John Henderson
Claiborne	Parmenius Briscoe
Copiah	Seth Grandberry
Copiah	Samuel N. Gilliland
Covington	John Colbert
Franklin	James C. Hawley
Franklin	David D. Gibson
Green	Archibald McManus
Hancock	P. Rutilius R. Pray
Hinds	Silas Brown
Jackson	William Starks
Jefferson	Claudius Gibson
Jefferson	William M. Green
Jones	John C. Thomas
Lawrence	Harmon Runnels
Marion	David Ford
Monroe	Larkin Pruett
Monroe	Robert Edrington
Monroe	George Higgason
Perry	Hugh McDonald
Pike	David Cleveland
Pike	William Dickson
Simpson	F. E. Plummer
Warren	William L. Sharkey
Washington	William B. Prince
Wayne	Thomas S. Sterling
Wilkinson	Thomas G. Ellis
Wilkinson	T. B. J. Hadley
Yazoo	Richard Sparks
