= 14th Mississippi Legislature =

←	13th Mississippi Legislature	15th Mississippi Legislature	→

Overview
- Legislative body: Mississippi Legislature
- Jurisdiction: Mississippi, United States
- Meeting place: Jackson, Mississippi
- Term: November 15, 1830 – December 16, 1830

Mississippi State Senate
- President: Abram M. Scott

Mississippi House of Representatives
- Speaker: M. F. DeGraffenreid

The 14th Mississippi Legislature met between November 15, 1830, and December 16, 1830, in Jackson, Mississippi.

== Senate ==
Abram M. Scott, as Lieutenant Governor, served ex officio as President of the Senate. David Gordon was elected Secretary and Joseph Pearce was elected Door-Keeper.

County District	Senator Name
Adams	Fountain Winston
Wilkinson	Cotesworth P. Smith
Pike, Marion	William C. Cage
Jackson, Hancock, Green, Perry	John McLeod
Amite, Franklin	Willie Jackson
Claiborne	Parmenas Briscoe
Copiah, Jefferson	Benjamin Kennedy
Wayne, Covington, Jones	Thomas Sterling
Lawrence, Simpson	Charles Lynch
Hinds, Rankin, Madison, Yazoo, Washington, Warren	Isaac Caldwell
Monroe, Lowndes	James F. Trotter

== House ==
M. F. DeGraffenreid was elected Speaker of the House, defeating A. M. Keegan and Richard Hurst 21-10-1 respectively. John H. Mallory was elected Clerk, and Lewis Whitesides was elected Doorkeeper.

County	Representative Name
Adams	John F. H. Claiborne
Adams	Robert T. Dunbar
Amite	Benjamin Huff
Amite	Richard Hurst
Claiborne	Adam Gordon
Claiborne	Thomas Gale
Copiah	Buckner Harris
Copiah	William N. Miller
Covington	John Watts
Franklin	John Cameron
Franklin	Ellis P. Passmore
Green	David McRae
Hancock	Elihu Carver
Hinds	Jeremiah Conant
Jackson	John McDonald
Jefferson	William L. Davis
Jefferson	James H. Montgomery
Jones	Samuel Ellis
Lawrence	A. M. Keegan
Lawrence	J. W. Pendleton
Lowndes	Charles H. Abert
Marion	William M. Rankin
Madison	Abraham Penquite
Monroe	John Bell
Monroe	George Higgason
Perry	Absalom Carter
Pike	Vincent Garner
Pike	James Harper
Rankin	Nehemiah McGee
Simpson	Frederick Carr
Warren	Samuel D. McCray
Washington	Frederick G. Trumbull
Wayne	John A. Edwards
Wilkinson	M. F. DeGraffenreid
Wilkinson	George H. Gordon
Yazoo	Joel A. George
Yazoo	Joseph W. Pendleton
