= 5th Mississippi Legislature =

1821 to 1822 legislative session

←	4th Mississippi Legislature	6th Mississippi Legislature	→

Overview
- Legislative body: Mississippi Legislature
- Jurisdiction: Mississippi, United States
- Meeting place: Columbia, Mississippi
- Term: November 5, 1821 – June 30, 1822

Mississippi State Senate
- President: James Patton

Mississippi House of Representatives
- Speaker: Cowles Mead

Sessions
- 1st: November 5, 1821 – November 24, 1821
- Special Session: June 3, 1822 – June 30, 1822

The 5th Mississippi Legislature met in Columbia, Mississippi in two sessions: first from November 5, 1821, to November 24, 1821, and then a special session from June 3, 1822, to June 30, 1822.

== Senate ==
In the first session, Lieutenant Governor James Patton served ex officio as President of the Senate. For the 1822 session, new lieutenant governor David Dickson replaced Patton.

County District	Senator
Adams	Joseph Sessions
Adams	Samuel Clement
Amite	Thomas Torrence
Wilkinson	John Joor (1st session)
Wilkinson	Abram M. Scott (2nd session)
Warren, Claiborne	Ralph Regan
Pike, Marion	William Spencer
Jackson, Hancock, Green, Perry	Isaac R. Nicholson
Lawrence	Thomas Anderson
Jefferson, Hinds	John Turnbull (1st session)
Jefferson, Hinds	Samuel Cavit (2nd session)
Monroe, Wayne, Lawrence	Harman A. Hays

== House ==
Cowles Mead was unanimously elected Speaker of the House. Peter A. Vandorn was elected Clerk and James R. Whitney was elected Door-keeper; both were non-representatives. At the start of the second session, William Yerby was elected Speaker on the first day (June 3, 1822) due to Mead's absence, but resigned the following day after Mead arrived in Columbia.

County	Representative
Adams	Abram Defrance
Adams	James S. Morrow
Adams (Natchez)	Edward Turner
Amite	William Gardner
Amite	James Jones
Amite	John Lowrey
Claiborne	Henry G. Johnston
Claiborne	Amos Whiting
Covington	Gowen Harris
Franklin	Bailey E. Chainey
Franklin	Thomas Cotton
Greene	?
Hancock	Noel Jourdan
Jackson	Thomas Bilbo
Jefferson	Cowles Mead
Jefferson	Robert McCray
Lawrence	Harmon Runnels
Lawrence	Brewster H. Jayne
Lawrence	Joseph Cooper
Marion	Charles Stovall
Monroe	William Cook
Perry	J. J. H. Morris
Pike	Wiley P. Harris
Pike	William Dickson
Pike	James Y. McNabb
Warren	Jacob Hyland
Wayne	Samuel W. Dickson
Wayne	Josiah Watts
Wilkinson	Moses Liddell
Wilkinson	Abram M. Scott
Wilkinson	William Yerby
