= 10th Mississippi Legislature =

1827 legislative session

←	9th Mississippi Legislature	11th Mississippi Legislature	→

Overview
- Legislative body: Mississippi Legislature
- Jurisdiction: Mississippi, United States
- Term: January 1, 1827 – February 8, 1827

Mississippi State Senate
- President: Gerard C. Brandon
- President pro tempore: Abram M. Scott

Mississippi House of Representatives
- Speaker: Isaac R. Nicholson

Sessions
- 1st: January 1, 1827 – February 8, 1827

The 10th Mississippi Legislature met from January 1, 1827, to February 8, 1827, in Jackson, Mississippi. Elections, for all representatives and some senators, were held in August 1826.

== Senate ==
State senators were elected to three-year terms on a rotating basis. Burnett, Scott, Cooper, and Irwin were elected to full three-year terms in August 1826. Torrence was elected to a two-year term in August 1826 to fill a vacancy caused by the death of Senator Charles C. Slocumb.

Abram M. Scott was elected president pro tempore of the Senate to fill in for Senate President and Lieutenant Governor Gerard C. Brandon who was serving as acting Governor. Non-senators William H. Chaille and Joseph Pearce were elected Secretary and Door-keeper respectively. The Senate adjourned on February 8, 1827.

County District	Senator Name	Year Elected
Pike, Marion	Willie P. Harris	1824
Lawrence, Simpson	Charles Lynch	1824
Hinds, Warren, Yazoo	Hardin D. Runnels	1824
Adams	Fountain Winston	1825
Jackson, Hancock, Green, Perry	John McLeod	1825
Monroe	William Dowsing	1825
Amite, Franklin	Thomas Torrence	1826
Wayne, Covington, Jones	Hamilton Cooper	1826
Wilkinson	Abram M. Scott	1826
Claiborne	Daniel Burnett	1826
Copiah, Jefferson	John L. Irwin	1826

== House ==
All representatives were elected in August 1826. Isaac R. Nicholson was elected Speaker of the House. Non-representatives James Phillips Jr. and Dillard Collins were elected Clerk and Door-Keeper respectively. The House adjourned on February 7, 1827.

County	Name of Representative
Adams	Charles B. Green
Adams	Archibald Dunbar
Amite	Solomon Weathersby
Amite	Richard Hurst
Claiborne	Joseph Moore
Claiborne	John Henderson
Copiah	Isaac R. Nicholson
Copiah	Samuel N. Gilleland
Covington	Abel L. Hatten
Franklin	John F. Weatherspoon
Franklin	Thomas Cotton
Green	Archibald McManus
Hancock	R. Rutelus P. Pray
Hinds	William J. Austin
Jackson	William C. Seamon
Jefferson	Cowles Mead
Jefferson	Philip Dickson
Jones	John C. Thomas
Lawrence	Joseph Cooper
Lawrence	Anthony Butler
Marion	Nathaniel Robbins
Monroe	George Higgason
Monroe	Robert Edrington
Monroe	James T. Trotter
Perry	J. J. H. Morris
Pike	David Cleveland
Pike	Peter Quinn
Simpson	Franklin E. Plummer
Warren	James Gibson
Wayne	Thomas S. Sterling
Wilkinson	Cotesworth P. Smith
Wilkinson	M. T. Degraffenreid
Yazoo	Richard Sparks
