= Runnels =

Runnels is a surname, and may refer to:

- Cody Garrett Runnels (born 1985), American wrestler and actor known as Cody Rhodes
- Dustin Patrick Runnels (born 1969), American wrestler known as Goldust or Dustin Rhodes
- Hardin Dudley Runnels (1789–1839), Mississippi state senator
- Hardin Richard Runnels (1820–1873), American politician; governor of Texas 1857–1859
- Harmon Runnels, American soldier and politician (1753–1839)
- Harold L. Runnels (1924–1980), American politician from New Mexico; U.S. representative 1971–80
- Hiram Runnels (1796–1857), American politician from Mississippi; governor of Mississippi 1833–35
- J. D. Runnels (b. 1984), American professional football player
- Mike Runnels (1945-2015), American politician from New Mexico
- Pete Runnels (1928–1991), American professional baseball player
- Randolph Runnels (b. 1827) American lawman in Panama
- Terri Runnels (b. 1966), American professional wrestling manager
- Tom Runnels (b. 1934), American professional football player
- Virgil Riley Runnels, Jr. (1945–2015), American wrestler known as "The American Dream" Dusty Rhodes

== See also ==
- Runnels County, Texas
- Runnells (disambiguation)
