= Runnel =

Runnel(s) may refer to:

- Runnel Stone, a hazardous rock pinnacle near Gwennap Head, Cornwall, United Kingdom
- Runnels, a surname
- Runnels County, Texas, United States
- A small stream
- A channel along the side of a bicycle stairway
