= Hardin Runnels =

Hardin Runnels may refer to:

- Hardin Dudley Runnels (1789–1839), Mississippi state senator
- Hardin Richard Runnels (1820–1873), governor of Texas, son of the former
