= George Torrey =

George Torrey may refer to:

- George Torrey (politician) (c. 1808–1886), American politician
- George Arnold Torrey (1838–1911), American politician, lawyer and writer
- George Burroughs Torrey (1863–1942), American painter
- George Safford Torrey (1891–1977), American botanist
