= Duncan Walker (disambiguation) =

Duncan Walker (1899–1963) was a Scottish footballer

Duncan Walker may also refer to:

- Duncan S. Walker (1794–1835), American lawyer
- Duncan Stephen Walker (1841–1912), American Army lieutenant colonel
- Duncan Walker, co-founder of Skyports
