= Daniel Williams (Mississippi politician) =

American politician

1st Secretary of State of Mississippi
- In office December 11, 1817 – January 1821
- Succeeded by: John A. Grimball

Daniel Williams was an American politician. He was the first Secretary of State of Mississippi, serving from 1817 to 1821.

== Biography ==
Daniel Williams was unanimously elected by the Mississippi Legislature as the first Secretary of State of Mississippi on December 11, 1817.^{.} He was re-elected unanimously on January 18, 1820. Williams resigned from the office in 1821, and the 1821 Mississippi Legislature elected John A. Grimball to replace him on November 13, 1821. He ran as a candidate in the 1827 Mississippi gubernatorial election.
