= Dunbarton plantation =

19th-century Mississippi location

Coordinates: 31.504°N 91.276°W

Dunbarton plantation was a 19th-century plantation house and farm in Adams County, Mississippi, United States that is perhaps most notable today as the site of a fire that destroyed a manuscript.

== History ==
Dunbarton was located 4 miles (6.4 km) from Washington, Mississippi and 10 miles (16 km) from Natchez "in the forks of Second Creek on the Liberty Road, the old Indian path from Fort Rosalie to Pensacola." The first owners of record were Martha Willis and her husband William Dunbar, brother of Joseph Dunbar, circa 1804. Dunbar was part of a family sometimes known at the time as the "country Dunbars", distinguishing them from the unrelated "city Dunbars" of Sir William Dunbar in Natchez. Martha Willis was said to be a daughter of John Willis, a North Carolinian "who came to the Natchez country with Judge David Ker...[Dunbarton] was constructed...with one story, a large cupola on the pinnacle of the roof commanding the surrounding scenery. It has the dignity of wide space and splendid decoration, with commodious galleries surrounding the house; the grounds enriched by beautiful gardens, wide-spread lawns and splendid trees. The furnishings were massive colonial, mahogany and rosewood, enriching each room. Being near the old Adams county court house, and several miles from Washington, the territorial capital, it was the gathering place of many noted men in the early days."

The Dunbar family first made their home in a rustic log cabin. The house was built between 1810 and 1814 of hand-sawed yellow poplar and ash, and the yard was planted with pecan trees, shrubbery, and roses.

In addition to farming, Dunbar owned a "horse power gin, where he had his own and his neighbors' cotton ginned. His plantation books show that the farmers who brought cotton to the gin were given receipts which they took to Natchez and gave to the merchants for cash; then the cotton would be delivered to the holder of the receipt, the cotton having a fixed value."

According to an account published in 1971, "Dunbar amassed a large estate and after being an invalid for several years, died in 1828, leaving his wife and 10 children. Mrs. Dunbar was a woman known for her good common sense and unusual energy, which enabled her to take care of the estate and manage it with ability." The Dunbars hired S. S. Prentiss to be a tutor to their children, which is what brought him to Mississippi where he was later a politician and famed orator. After Martha Willis Dunbar died the estate passed to her heirs, eventually, in 1870, becoming the home of Jacksonian Democratic politician and Mississippi historian J. F. H. Claiborne, who married a Dunbar. There was a family burial ground on the property.

== Fire ==
Dunbarton burned Sunday, March 2, 1884. The cause was reported to be "a defective flue in the servants' room, and with the old mansion perished all the valuable contents, including books and papers." J. F. H. Claiborne of Dunbarton had published Mississippi, as a province, territory, and state: with biographical notices of eminent citizens, volume 1 in 1880, but "the completed manuscript of v. 2 was lost in the burning of the author's home in Mar. 1884". Claiborne apparently worked out of the "Prentiss shack" where Prentiss had lived during his second year in Mississippi. Claiborne's daughter Martha Claiborne assisted him with his work on the books.

== Cemetery ==
There is a Dunbarton family cemetery on Old Liberty Road. Names on the gravestones include Claiborne, Baylor, McPheters, Garrett, and Dunbar. As of 1946, it had "a 6 foot brick wall around it, not any gate, all kinds of vines all over the cemetery and running on the stones. A task to enter it, read & write the inscriptions."
