= Beverly R. Grayson =

American politician

Speaker of the Mississippi House of Representatives
- In office January 1, 1821 – February 12, 1821
- Preceded by: Edward Turner
- Succeeded by: Gerard C. Brandon

Member of the Mississippi House of Representatives from the Adams County district
- In office January 3, 1820 – February 12, 1821

Personal details
- Born: 1782
- Died: 1843 (aged 60–61)

Beverly R. Grayson (1782 – 1843) was an American public official and state legislator in Mississippi. He served as a clerk of the territorial supreme court until 1808. He represented Adams County, Mississippi in the Mississippi House of Representatives in 1820 and 1821. In January 1820 he sponsored a resolution, which passed, that "the land office west of the Pearl River to deposit its revenues from land sales into the Bank of the State of Mississippi." He served as Speaker of the Mississippi House of Representatives in the 4th Mississippi Legislature, serving from January 1, 1821, to February 12, 1821.

In 1821, he was appointed Register of the Land Office at Washington, in the state of Mississippi.

He ran for election to Congress in the Mississippi 1826 special and 1826 general election. He announced his candidacy for Mississippi governor in the 1827 election but lost to Gerard Brandon. Grayson ran for election to the State Senate in 1839.

He was on the Board of Trustees of Jefferson College. Grayson was on the Board of Trustees of Elizabeth Female Academy and helped managed a lottery authorized by the legislature for the school to raise funds.
