= 1826 Mississippi's at-large congressional district special election =

A special election was held in Mississippi's at-large congressional district on July 11, 1826, to fill a vacancy caused by the death of Christopher Rankin (J) on March 14, 1826

== Election results ==
Candidate	Party	Votes	Percent
William Haile	Jacksonian	1,591	30.5%
John H. Norton	Unknown	1,330	25.5%
Beverely R. Grayson	Unknown	1,212	23.2%
Adam L. Bingaman	Unknown	1,089	20.9%
Source: Ourcampaigns.com

Haile took his seat December 4, 1826

== See also ==
- List of special elections to the United States House of Representatives
