= 1827 Mississippi gubernatorial election =

- August 6, 1827
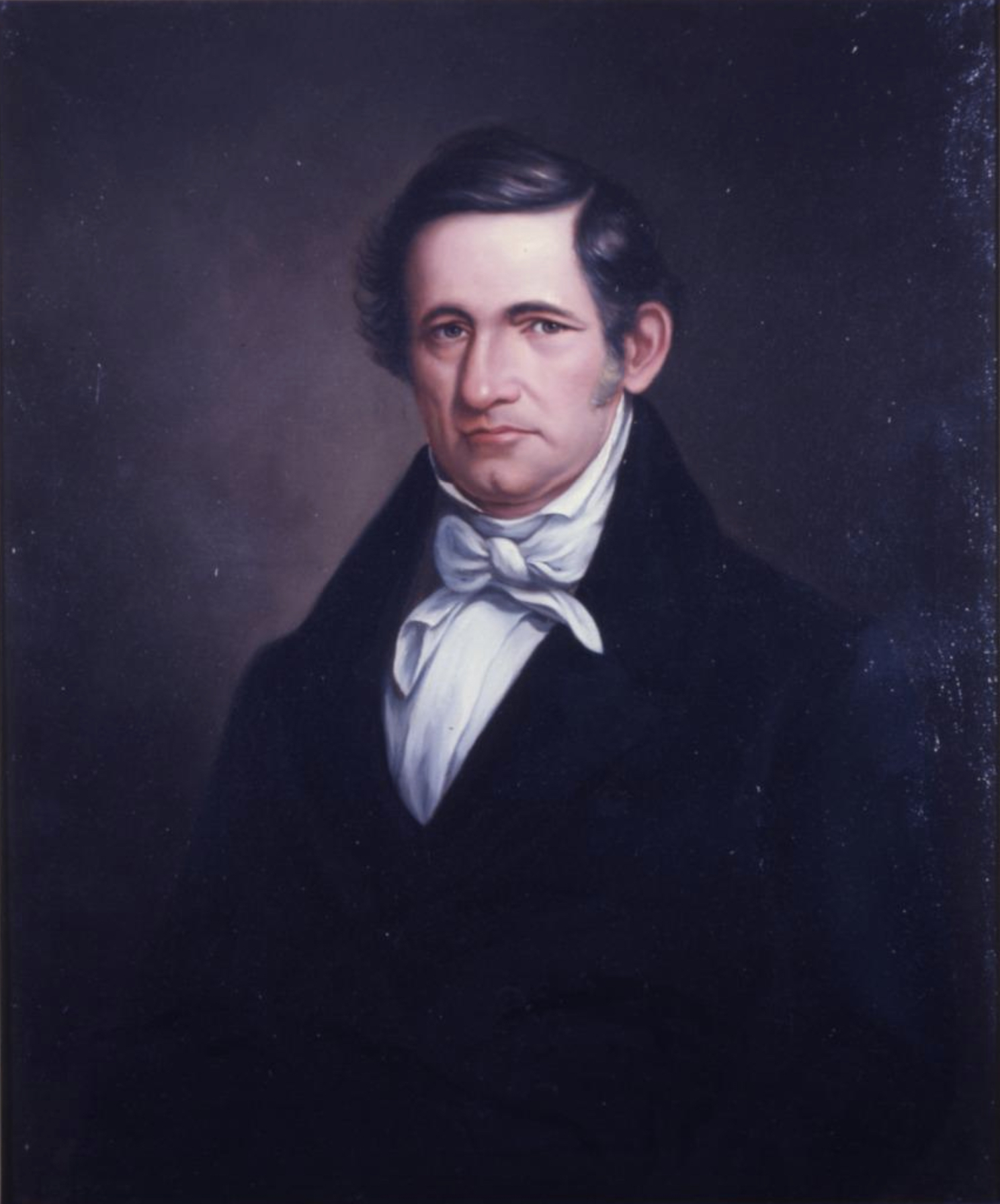

| Nominee | Gerard C. Brandon | Daniel Williams | Beverly R. Grayson |
| Party | Democratic-Republican | Democratic-Republican | Democratic-Republican |
| Popular vote | 5,482 | 3,519 | 1,861 |
| Percentage | 50.47% | 32.40% | 17.13% |
- County results Brandon: 40–50% 50–60% 60–70% 70–80% 80–90% Williams: 30–40% 50–60% 60–70% Grayson: 50–60% No votes
Governor before election
David Holmes
Democratic-Republican
Elected Governor
Gerard Brandon
Democratic-Republican

The 1827 Mississippi gubernatorial election was held on August 6, 1827, to elect the governor of Mississippi. Gerard Brandon, a Democratic-Republican won against Daniel Williams and Beverely R. Grayson, two other Democratic Republicans. (Note: 127 votes were counted for A. Williams and D.W. Williams, but should be counted under Daniel Williams.)

== Results ==
Mississippi gubernatorial election, 1827
| Party | Candidate | Votes | % |
|---|---|---|---|
| Democratic-Republican | Gerard C. Brandon | 5,482 | 50.47% |
| Democratic-Republican | Daniel Williams | 3,519 | 32.40% |
| Democratic-Republican | Beverly R. Grayson | 1,861 | 17.13% |
| Total votes | | 10,862 | 100.00 |
| Democratic-Republican hold | | | |
