= Selma Plantation =

Historic house in Mississippi, United States

- Selma Plantation House
- U.S. National Register of Historic Places
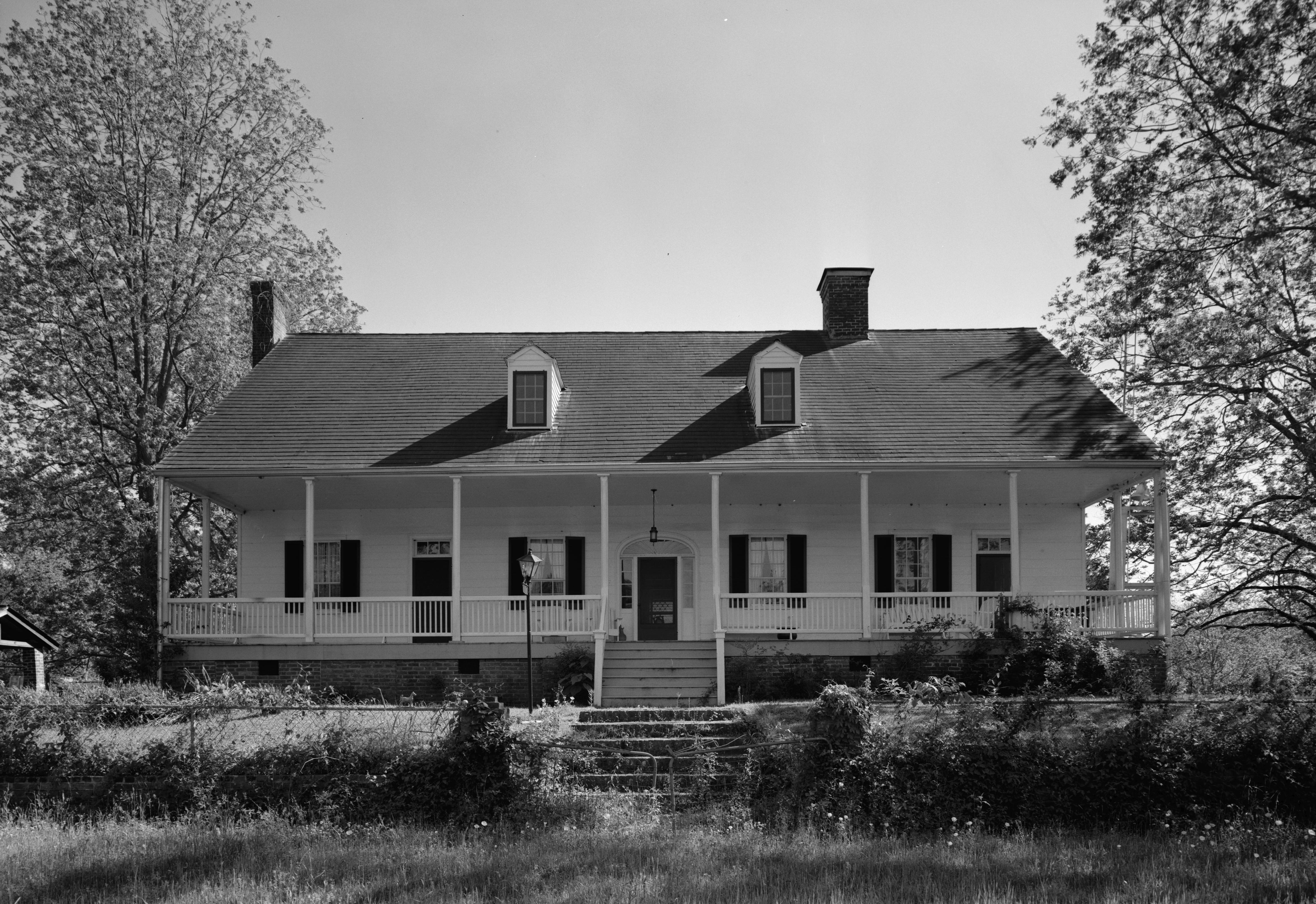

- Location within Mississippi Location within the United States
- Location: 467 Selma Road, Natchez, Mississippi, U.S.
- Area: 55.3 acres (22.4 ha)
- Built: c. 1811
- Architectural style: Federal
- NRHP reference No.: 89000207
- Added to NRHP: June 15, 1989

The Selma Plantation is a Southern plantation with a historic cottage located in Natchez, Mississippi, USA.

== History ==
The house was built circa 1811 by Gerard Chittocque Brandon. His son, Gerard Brandon, served as the governor of Mississippi from 1825 to 1826, and again from 1826 to 1832. The property remained in the Brandon family until 1875.

== Architectural significance ==
The cottage was designed in the Federal architectural style. It has been listed on the National Register of Historic Places since June 15, 1989.

The home is also a Mississippi Landmark property.
