= Howell Washington Runnels Sr. =

American politician (1823–1895)

Howell W. Runnels, Sr.

Member of the Texas House of Representatives from the 1st district
- In office November 21, 1855 – November 7, 1859
- Preceded by: Hardin Richard Runnels
- Succeeded by: Solomon H. Pirkey

Personal details
- Born: March 31, 1823 Lawrence County, Mississippi, US
- Died: November 7, 1895 (aged 72) Texarkana, Bowie County, Texas, US
- Spouse: Martha Caroline Adams
- Children: 5
- Parent(s): Hardin D. Runnels; Martha B. Darden

Howell Washington Runnels Sr. (1823–1895) was a Texan politician who served as the 6th and 7th representative for Texas House of Representatives, District 1.

== Life ==
Runnels was born in Mississippi on March 31, 1823 to Patsy Darden and Hardin D. Runnels. In 1842, his family immigrated to Texas, including Howell's 3 brothers, Hardin, Edmond, and Hiram. They all assumed leading positions in the Texas state government. Runnels eventually married someone Martha Caroline Adams on October 1, 1859, in Harrison, Texas.

In the 1870 census, Runnels was listed as a store clerk in Boston, Texas. He was also listed with his wife and 5 children. Sometime in 1876, Runnels moved to Texarkana, Bowie County, Texas, where he lived for the remainder of his life. He was buried in Rose Hill Cemetery, in Texarkana, Texas.

== Politics ==
He served as the representative for District 1 of the Texas House of Representatives from November 21, 1855 - November 7, 1859.
