= Runnells =

Runnells may refer to:

- Runnells, Iowa, a city in Polk County
- Fanny Huntington Runnells Poole (1863–1940), American writer
- Maud Runnells (1934–2002), known as Marion Montgomery, American jazz singer
- Tom Runnells (born 1955), American baseball player and coach
- Runnells Specialized Hospital, a hospital in Berkeley Heights, New Jersey

== See also ==
- Runnels, a surname
