= M. F. DeGraffenreid =

American politician

11th Speaker of the Mississippi House of Representatives
- In office November 15, 1830 – December 20, 1831
- Preceded by: Joseph Dunbar
- Succeeded by: David Pembel

Member of the Mississippi House of Representatives from the Wilkinson County district
- In office January 5, 1829 – December 20, 1831
- In office January 1, 1827 – February 8, 1827

Personal details
- Party: Democratic

M. F. DeGraffenreid was an American politician. He was the 11th Speaker of the Mississippi House of Representatives, serving from 1830 to 1831.

== Biography ==
M. F. DeGraffenreid practiced law in Woodsville, Mississippi. DeGraffenreid was first elected to represent Wilkinson County in the Mississippi House of Representatives in 1826 for the 1827 session. He was re-elected to the House for the 12th Mississippi Legislature taking place in January 1829. During this session, DeGraffenreid served on the following committees: Enrolled Bills; Revisal and Unfinished Business. DeGraffenreid was re-elected to serve in the 13th Mississippi Legislature in February 1830. He was re-elected to the House for the 14th Mississippi Legislature in November 1830. During this term DeGraffenreid was elected Speaker of the House. He was re-elected to the House for the 15th Mississippi Legislature, taking place in November 1831, for which he was again elected Speaker. In 1833, DeGraffenreid was a candidate for U. S. Senator, but John Black was elected instead. In 1837, DeGraffenreid was considered for the Democratic nomination for Governor of Mississippi. He was considered again for the nomination in March 1840. He was a delegate to the Democratic National Convention of 1840. In 1845 he represented Williamson County, Tennessee, at the Southern and Western Convention.

== Personal life ==
DeGraffenreid was a Freemason and helped establish a new branch in Woodville in 1832. His wife, P. DeGraffenreid, died on October 16, 1838, in Woodville.
