= Hanson Alsbury =

American politician

Member of the Mississippi State Senate from the Greene County and others district
- In office January 1836 – January 1842
- Preceded by: Thomas P. Falconer
- Succeeded by: A. W. Ramsey

Member of the Mississippi House of Representatives from the Covington County district
- In office 1830

Personal details
- Born: October 18, 1801 Virginia, U.S.
- Died: 1857 (aged 55–56)
- Party: Democratic

Hanson Alsbury (October 18, 1801 – 1857) was an American lawyer and Democratic politician. He served in the Mississippi State Senate from 1836 to 1842.

== Early life ==
Hanson Alsbury was born in Virginia on October 18, 1801. He was one of ten children of Thomas Alsbury Jr. and Leah Jane (Catlett) Alsbury. The family moved to Kentucky in 1805. Hanson studied law and moved to Mississippi, where he married Harriet Plummer. He moved to Gallatin, Copiah County, Mississippi, where he opened a law practice. Alsbury moved to Texas in 1824, and briefly settled in San Felipe. He then moved to the area of the Trinity River where he was a surveyor. In 1826, his wife Harriet became sick and they moved back to Mississippi.

== Political career ==
In 1830, Alsbury represented Covington County in the Mississippi House of Representatives. Alsbury was elected to represent Greene, Perry, Wayne (1836-1837 only), Hancock, and Jackson Counties in the Mississippi State Senate to serve in the 1836 session. He served continuously through the 1841 session. In 1841, the Democratic Party nominated Alsbury for governor of Mississippi. After Alsbury left the state, the party nominated Tilghman Tucker instead. In 1841, Alsbury returned to Brazoria County, Texas. In 1842, they moved to Galveston, and later they moved to San Antonio. Alsbury died in 1857.
