= Duncan S. Walker =

American lawyer and politician (c. 1794–1835)

- Born: 1794; Pennsylvania, United States
- Died: December 31, 1835 (aged 41); Off St. Jago de Cuba
- Occupation: Lawyer

Duncan S. Walker (1794 – December 31, 1835) was an American lawyer and a Mississippi state legislator.

== Biography ==
Walker was a son of Jonathan Hoge Walker and Lucy Duncan who were married in 1790. Duncan S. Walker was their second of eight children and the oldest who survived to adulthood. Walker was originally from the Carlisle, Pennsylvania area and moved to Mississippi with his brother Robert J. Walker in the 1820s. Their prosperous cousin Stephen Duncan already lived in the lower Mississippi River valley. He, like his brother, was a Jacksonian Democrat.

In 1824 he was selected as a second lieutenant of the Natchez Fencibles militia company.

In 1828, Walker ran for a seat in the Mississippi House of Representatives from Adams County. He served in the 12th Mississippi legislature. He later moved to Louisiana where he owned a plantation.

He died of a pulmonary illness off Cuba in winter 1835 at age 42.

== Sources ==
- Power, Steve (1897). The memento, old and new Natchez, 1700 to 1897. Old and new Natchez, 1700 to 1897. Natchez, Miss.: Myrtle Bank Publishers. LCCN 84061565. OCLC 2920774.
- Rothstein, Morton (1979). "The Changing Social Networks and Investment Behavior of a Slaveholding Elite in the Ante Bellum South: Some Natchez Nabobs, 1800–1860". In Greenfield, Sidney M.; Strickon, Arnold; Aubey, Robert T. (eds.). Entrepreneurs in Cultural Context. School of American Research, Advanced Seminar Series. Albuquerque: University of New Mexico Press. pp. 65–88. ISBN 978-0-8263-0504-6. LCCN 78021433. OCLC 4859059.
