= Isaac R. Nicholson =

American judge (–1844)

7th Speaker of the Mississippi House of Representatives
- In office January 2, 1826 – February 8, 1827
- Preceded by: Cowles Mead
- Succeeded by: Charles B. Green

Associate Justice of the Supreme Court of Mississippi
- In office 1829–1833
- Preceded by: District created
- Succeeded by: District disestablished

Member of the Mississippi State Senate from the Hancock, Greene, Jones, and Perry Counties district
- In office January 3, 1820 – June 30, 1822
- Succeeded by: Laughlin McKay

Member of the Mississippi House of Representatives from the Hinds County district
- In office January 1, 1836 – 1838

Member of the Mississippi House of Representatives from the Copiah County district
- In office January 3, 1825 – February 7, 1827
- Preceded by: William Tullis
- Succeeded by: Seth Grandberry

Member of the Mississippi House of Representatives from the Greene County district
- In office January 5, 1819 – February 1819
- Preceded by: George B. Dameron
- Succeeded by: Hugh McDonald

Personal details
- Born: 1789 or 1790 Pendleton, South Carolina, U.S.
- Died: August 28, 1844 (aged 54) Hinds County, Mississippi, U.S.
- Party: Democratic

Isaac R. Nicholson (1789/1790 – August 28, 1844) was an American lawyer, politician, and jurist. He was a justice of the Supreme Court of Mississippi from the establishment of a new seat on the court in 1828 until the court was abolished in favor of a new structure in 1833. He served in the Mississippi House of Representatives from 1819-1827 including as the 7th Speaker of the Mississippi House of Representatives, serving from 1826 to 1827. He also served in the Mississippi Senate. In the 1830s he returned to the Mississippi House of Representatives.

== Early life ==
He was born in 1789 or 1790 in Pendleton, South Carolina, and resided for a time in Georgia. He then moved to northern Alabama and practiced law there. He moved to Mississippi in 1815.

== Political career ==
Nicholson represented Greene County in the Mississippi House of Representatives in the 2nd Mississippi Legislature in 1819. For the next three sessions, from 1820 to 1822, Nicholson represented a district composed of Jackson, Hancock, and Greene Counties in the Mississippi State Senate. In the final session of his term, Perry County was also in his district. In 1824, Nicholson was re-elected to the House, this time representing Copiah County, for the 1825 session. Nicholson was re-elected for the 1826 session and was elected Speaker of the House. He was re-elected again for the 1827 session and was once again elected Speaker, serving until the House adjourned on February 7, 1827. In 1829, Nicholson was appointed a justice of the Supreme Court of Mississippi, representing the new 5th District. After the Mississippi Constitution of 1832, a new structure for the Court was created, and Nicholson no longer had a position on the Court. He then practiced law in Natchez, Mississippi. In 1836 Nicholson once again served in the House, this time representing Hinds County. He voted in favor of Robert J. Walker's election to the U. S. Senate. He was a Democrat.

== Personal life and death ==
Nicholson married America Gilmer in 1820. Nicholson suddenly died of congestive fever at his residence near Clinton, Mississippi, on August 28, 1844, aged 54.

Political offices
Preceded by Newly established seat	Justice of the Supreme Court of Mississippi; 1828–1833	Succeeded by Court abolished
