= Howell W. Runnels =

Mississippi politician (d. bef. 1837)

- Died: bef. May 1837

Howell W. Runnels (d. bef. May 1837) was a Mississippi state legislator. His father was Harmon Runnels, and his brothers were Hiram G. Runnels (a governor of Mississippi in the 1830s), Harmon M. Runnels, and Hardin D. Runnels. He was said to have shared his father's temperament. He married Anne Buckhannon in Jasper, Georgia in October 1810. He represented Lawrence, Marion, and Hancock counties in the Mississippi state senate in 1819. In 1820 he represented the senatorial district of Lawrence, Wayne, and Covington counties. He appears to have represented also Lawrence in the senate in 1821. According to a history of Lawrence County, Hardin D. and Howell W. Runnels removed to Hinds County in the 1820s, and "the wife of Howell Runnels" is "buried in the town cemetery near the Bass home."

He was married in 1827 to Cary D. Collins of Marion County, Mississippi. In 1832 he chaired a Mississippi committee to endorse the re-election of Andrew Jackson to the presidency. He was a delegate to the Mississippi Constitutional Convention of 1832, representing Yazoo County. In 1833 he was a candidate for the Mississippi House of Representatives from Yazoo County. He died sometime before May 1837.

== Sources ==
- Powell, Susie V., ed. (1938). Lawrence County (PDF). Source Material for Mississippi History, Volume XXXIX. WPA Statewide Historical Research Project – via Mississippi Library Commission (mlc.lib.ms.us).
