= William Yerby =

Mississippi politician (1758–1824)

William Yerby (1758–1824) was an American plantation owner and Mississippi state legislator. He operated a tavern. He lived in the vicinity of Pinckneyville, Wilkinson County, Mississippi and was a local justice of the peace during the territorial period. In August 1815 he wrote to Andrew Jackson to inform him of the "destruction of fort near Pinckneyville, Mississippi Territory, by local citizens," reporting that it had been stripped off everything of value down to the door hinges and nails. In 1819 he listed for sale his plantation, Plum Grove, which he described as "in the neighbourhood of Pinckneyville, adjoining land of Richard Butler and Mrs Semple on the west, James Williams on the north, Patrick Foley on the south, containing about 1600 arpens, upwards of 200 acres, cleared and suitable for the plough. Its situation for health, fertility of soil, and neighborhood is excelled by none in the western world. There is on the Premises excellent Gin, Mill and press; the dwelling and out buildings are comfortable. A sufficient quantity of stock, to "lcommence with, will be sold with the land if immediate application bemade".

He was speaker of the Mississippi House of Representatives in 1822. His son, William W. Yerby, killed Isaac Guion's son, Army second lieutenant Frederick L. Guion (recently graduated from West Point), in a duel in 1824. As of 1825, William W. Yerby Jr. was law partners with V. T. Crawford in Liberty, Amite County, Mississippi.
