= George Torrey (politician) =

American politician

George Torrey (c. 1808 – September 9, 1886) was a state legislator in Mississippi. He married and had several children including William D. Torrey who became a lawyer and state legislator. He owned the "Sunflower" cotton plantation on the Yazoo River and lived in Jefferson County, Mississippi. He served in the Mississippi Senate and in 1845 introduced finance legislation that became law.

He died September 9, 1886, aged 78, after a long illness.
