= Benjamin L. C. Wailes =

Mississippi public official (1797–1862)

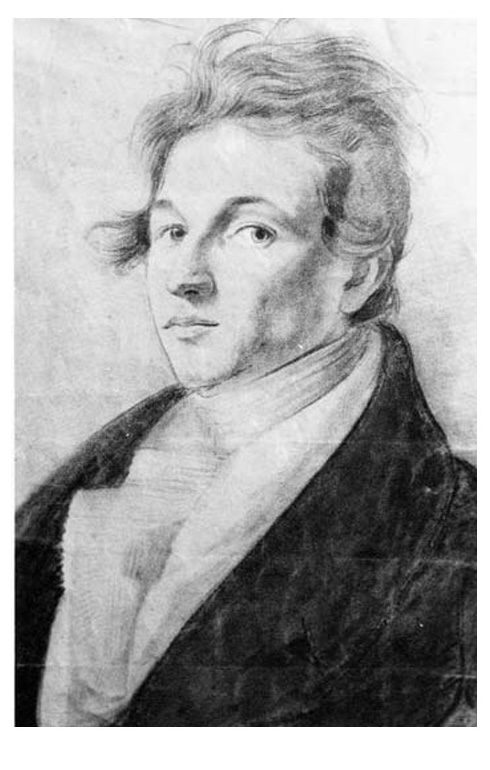
- This portrait may have been made by his friend John James Audubon, who did "chalk drawings in black and grisaille, rather flat and almost caricaturish" of four other members of the Wailes family
- Born: August 1, 1797; Georgia
- Died: November 16, 1862 (aged 65)

Benjamin Leonard Covington Wailes (August 1, 1797 – November 16, 1862) was a surveyor, government land agent, Indian agent, state legislator, college professor, university administrator, historian, geologist, naturalist/collector, and land and slave owner of Mississippi, United States.

He represented Adams County, Mississippi, in the Mississippi House of Representatives in 1825 and 1826.

Wailes organized the Mississippi Historical Society in the 1850s, making important acquisitions for a state history collection; the organization lapsed after his death and then was reestablished as the Mississippi Department of Archives and History.

Born in Georgia to a family of Marylanders, he moved with his parents in 1807 to Washington, the capital of Mississippi Territory. He was educated at Jefferson College and then spent most of the rest of his life as a member of the college's board of directors. He married a distant cousin, Rebecca Covington, whose father was U.S. Army General Leonard Covington. Buried in the Wailes family cemetery "in back of the old Wailes home at Washington."

== Sources ==
- Mitchell, Dennis J. (2014). A New History of Mississippi. Jackson: University Press of Mississippi. ISBN 9781626740198. LCCN 2013044104. OCLC 863127649. Project MUSE book 33980.
- Sydnor, Charles S. (May 1937). "Historical Activities in Mississippi in the Nineteenth Century". The Journal of Southern History. 3 (2). doi:10.2307/2191879.
- ——— (1938). A Gentlemen of the Old Natchez Region: Benjamin L. C. Wailes. Durham, North Carolina: Duke University Press. LCCN 38008687. OCLC 11015731. OL 5604504W.
