= Parmenas Briscoe =

American politician

2nd President Pro Tempore of the Mississippi State Senate
- In office January 1834 – January 1836
- Preceded by: Charles Lynch
- Succeeded by: W. Van Norman

Member of the Mississippi State Senate from the Claiborne County district
- In office January 1844 – January 1850
- Preceded by: Benjamin G. Humphreys
- Succeeded by: George Torrey
- In office January 1834 – January 1836
- Preceded by: Adam Gordon
- Succeeded by: James H. Maury
- In office January 1830 – January 1833
- Preceded by: Thomas Freeland
- Succeeded by: Adam Gordon

Member of the Mississippi House of Representatives from the Claiborne County district
- In office January 1828 – January 1830

Personal details
- Born: January 23, 1784 Virginia, U.S.
- Died: November 29, 1850 (aged 66) At sea, near Acapulco, Mexico
- Party: Democratic
- Children: 12, including Andrew

Parmenas Briscoe (January 23, 1784 - November 29, 1850) was an American planter and longtime state legislator in Mississippi. He represented Claiborne County in the Mississippi House of Representatives and Mississippi Senate on and off between 1828 and 1850. He also was the second President of the Mississippi State Senate, serving from 1834 to 1836.

== Early life ==
Parmenas Briscoe was born on January 23, 1784, in Virginia. He was the son of William Briscoe and Elizabeth Wallace Briscoe. His family lived in Madison County, Kentucky, but Parmenas moved to Mississippi at the turn of the 19th century. He served as a captain in the Creek War and in July 1812 was the general in the Mississippi State Militia. Briscoe was a planter.

== Political career ==
Briscoe served as county tax assessor and collector from 1816 to 1821. In 1828 and 1829, Briscoe represented Claiborne County in the Mississippi House of Representatives. He was then elected to represent the same county in the Mississippi State Senate in the 1830 and 1831 sessions. He then served in the 1835 session. From 1834 to 1836, Briscoe was the President of the Mississippi State Senate. Briscoe was elected to the Senate again as a Democrat and served in the 1844, 1846, and 1848 sessions. In 1850 Briscoe decided to temporarily move to California for the purpose of making money. Briscoe died at sea on the way home on November 29, 1850, on the steamer Montezuma near Acapulco, Mexico. Briscoe was buried at sea.

== Personal life ==
Briscoe married twice. He and his first wife had one son, John. He married his second wife, Mary "Polly" Montgomery (1794-1845) on December 18, 1809. They had five sons and six daughters together. One of their sons, Andrew (born 1810), moved to Texas and became prominent there, later having a county named after him.
