= William Van Norman =

American politician

William Van Norman, sometimes documented as W. Van Norman, was a politician in the United States. He was born in North Carolina. He served as President of the Mississippi Senate from 1836-1837. He also served in the Mississippi House of Representatives.

Van Norman was elected to represent Amite County in the Mississippi Senate in 1835. He was elected as president at the start of the session January 1836.

He voted to postpone indefinitely a petition to manumit an enslaved person.

== See also ==
- Lieutenant Governor of Mississippi#History
