= Joseph Dunbar (politician) =

Mississippi planter (1780s–1846)

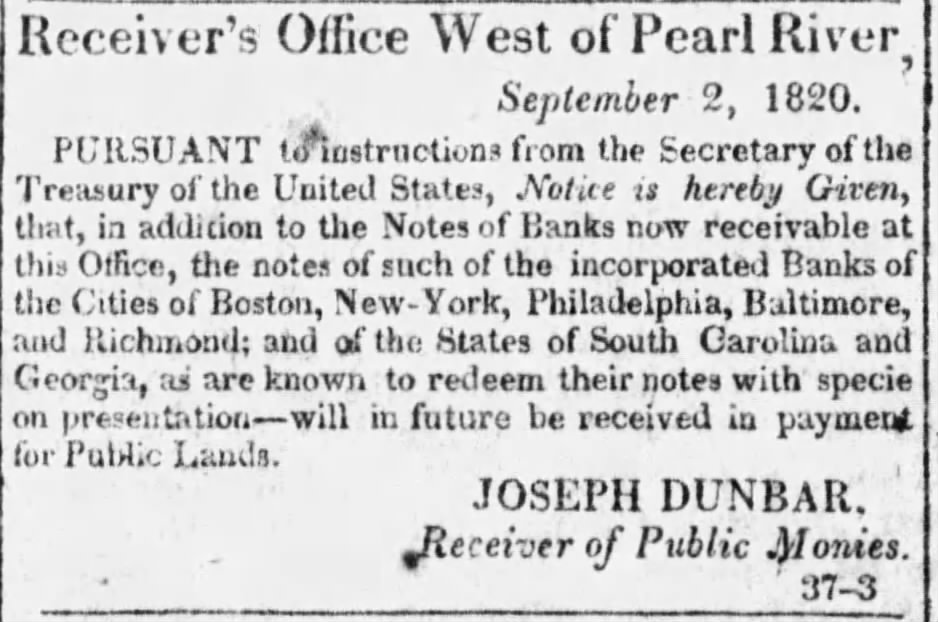
Receiver's Office West of Pearl River, Natchez Gazette, Mississippi, September 23, 1820

Joseph Dunbar (c. 1782–July 15, 1846), sometimes Col. Jo. Dunbar, was a politician, plantation owner, and racehorse owner of the Natchez District in Mississippi, United States. He associated with the Jacksonian Democratic Party in the state. Said to be a "heavy planter" of cotton, he invented the notion of wrapping cotton in iron bands instead of hemp bagging, in part to stick it to Kentucky and South Carolina on tariff issues; cotton grown by his slaves on his land was said to bring high prices from cotton traders selling to the mills of Liverpool, England. At the time of his death he was described by a newspaper of the state capital as "one of the fathers of the State."

== Early life ==
Dunbar was born about 1782 in British West Florida, just prior to the cession of the Natchez District to Spain. He was one of nine children, six sons and three daughters, born to his mother, Ann Beaver, and father, Robert Dunbar, who came to the Natchez from North Carolina in April 1773. According to a grave marker at Oakley Grove Plantation Cemetery in Adams County, Mississippi, Ann Beaver (c. 1848–1822) was from Virginia, and Robert Dunbar (c. 1750–1826) was a native of North Carolina. He was from a family sometimes called the "country Dunbars" to distinguish them from the unrelated "city Dunbars" in Natchez.

== Career ==
Joseph Dunbar said he had briefly served in a military capacity only in 1803 at the time of the transfer of Louisiana to the United States. In 1808 Jo Dunbar married Lizzie Magruder at Natchez. They had one son but he died young in 1820. The family lived near Church Hill, sometimes called the Maryland Settlement of Jefferson County.

During his career he was sheriff of Jefferson county, Mississippi Territory in 1813, and a delegate to the Mississippi Territorial Legislature in 1815. Dunbar was representative in the Mississippi State Legislature in 1819–1820, 1829–1830, and 1832–1834; Receiver of Public Moneys in the General Land Office at Washington, Mississippi from 1820 to 1827 and Surveyor General for Mississippi in 1830–1831.

The Washington land office was established in Mississippi Territory in 1803 and covered a L-shaped area of land including the Natchez District south of the lands of the Choctaw Nation and east of the Pearl River. When he was working for the land office he "arbitrarily charged the government $500 for an assistant" because he claimed the Relief Act of 1821 had made his duties excessive. The Comptroller of the Treasury declined to reimburse Dunbar for his expense.

In winter 1819 Dunbar took delivery of "some negroes and horses he had bought in Maryland" that were delivered to him by a carpenter named Holmes Hinkley who had just finished a job working on the U.S. Capitol. He was secretary of Jefferson College in 1822. The same year he lived at Washington and had a business association with James C. Wilkins. In 1825 he was part of a committee to welcome the Marquis de Lafayette on his tour of the United States. In the 1826 will of his father, Robert Dunbar, he was bequeathed three enslaved people: "(old) Harry, (young) Romeo + (young) Emanuel."

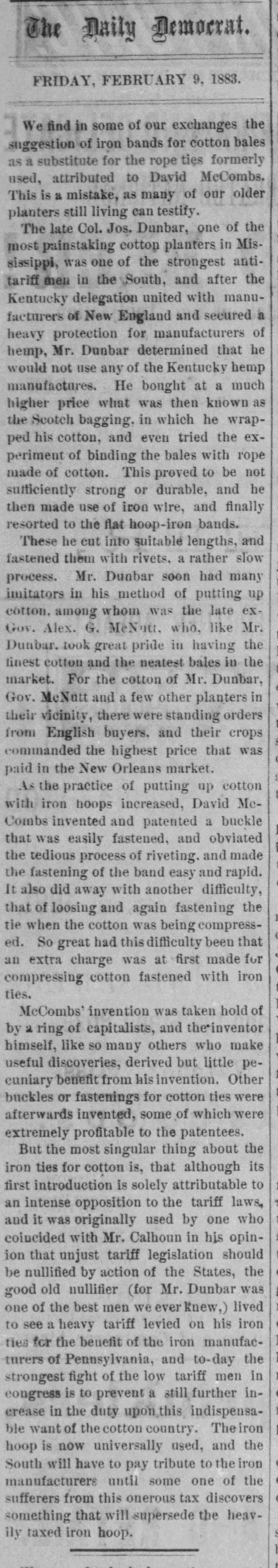
Iron bands for cotton bales, 1883

In 1831, the city of Nashville placed a runaway slave ad for Daniel and Betsey. The couple had run away from Joseph Dunbar in Mississippi and gotten to Williamson County, Tennessee, where the city had bought them for the cost of jail fees. Dunbar was elected Speaker of the Mississippi House of Representatives for the 1831 to 1832 term. In 1834 he and Thomas Hinds were among those representatives of the Democratic Party in Natchez expressing support for Andrew Jackson's war on the Second Bank of the United States. The debate devolved into a melee, and Dunbar, Thomas Hinds, and John F. H. Claiborne were "listed as one of the outnumbered Democratic participants." In 1839 he owned 3,000 acres in Warren County, Mississippi, "in addition to his extensive holdings in Jefferson County."

As of 1840 he was known as a "heavy planter" in the cotton-growing plantation complex business. Dunbar was president of the Agricultural and Horticultural Society in 1842; he showed a sorrel colt at the fair. He was also a sponsor of the Southern Planter, which premiered and disappeared in 1842. It was meant to be a learned agricultural journal for the Slave Power but could not attract enough sponsors, even though Dunbar contributed $50 toward increased circulation.

He was offered as a candidate for Congress in 1843 at which time noted Whig speaker S. S. Prentiss said of him: "Some men, they say, are made Democrats, some dyed in the wool Democrats, but Jo Dunbar was born a Democrat." Dunbar was aligned with the so-called Bond-Paying Democratic Party in 1843. He was a brother of the Thomas Hinds Masonic Lodge No. 48.

Dunbar died July 15, 1846 at his plantation Arundo in the Church Hill section ofJefferson County, Mississippi at age 64.

In his memoir of 1870 William Henry Sparks recalled Dunbar, writing, "Who that has ever sojourned for a time in this dear old county, does not remember the generous and elegant hospitality of Colonel Wood, Joseph Dunbar, and Mr. Chew...It seems invidious to individualize the hospitality of this community, where all were so distinguished; but I cannot forbear my tribute of respect — my heart's gratitude — to Wood and Dunbar, I came among these people young and a stranger, poor, and struggling to get up in the world. These two opened their hearts, their doors, and their purses to me; but it was not alone to me. In this neighborhood was built the first Protestant Episcopal Church in the State, and here worshipped the Woods, Dunbars, MacGruders, Shields, Greens, and others composing the settlement."

== Kinship network ==
Dunbar's parents, originally from the British colonies of North Carolina and Virginia, moved to West Florida around 1773. Their plantation near Natchez was called Oakley Grove.

- Elizabeth Dunbar married Gabriel Benoist "of Nantes, France," with whom she had one child, Victoire Benoist. Victoire married Judge William Bayard Shields and had six children, one of whom, Joseph Dunbar Shields, wrote a history of the Natchez District.
- William Dunbar m. Martha Willis, settled Dunbarton plantation on Second Creek; Dunbarton burned 1884
  - William H. Dunbar
  - Martha Dunbar (1811–1895) m. J. F. H. Claiborne
- Joseph Dunbar m. Olivia Magruder, settled Arunda plantation in Jefferson County
- Jane Dunbar m. David Ferguson, lived at Oakley Grove plantation
  - Dr. George C. Ferguson
  - Margaret Ferguson
  - Charlotte Ferguson m. Aylette Buckner, they lived at Airlie
  - Ann Ferguson m. David Hunt
- Robert Dunbar m. Sarah W. Chotard, half-sister of Henry Chotard
- James Dunbar m1. Betsy Bisland (c. 1792–1822), m2. Mrs. January
- Charlotte Dunbar m. George Newman
- Isaac Dunbar m1. Mary Wilkinson, m2. Elizabeth Wilkinson
- Samuel Dunbar m. Eliza Marbury

== See also ==
- Pharsalia Race Course

== Sources ==
- Beamish, Ian William (October 21, 2013). Saving the South: Agricultural Reform in the Southern United States, 1819–1861 (Thesis). Baltimore, Maryland: Johns Hopkins University.
- Carey, Bill (2018). Runaways, Coffles and Fancy Girls: A History of Slavery in Tennessee. Nashville, Tennessee: Clearbrook Press. ISBN 978-0-9725680-4-3. LCCN 2018903570. OCLC 1045068878.
- Fisher, Chas. E. (May 1931). "The Hinkley Locomotive Works". The Railway and Locomotive Historical Society Bulletin (25): 6–11. ISSN 0033-8842. JSTOR 43519588.
- James, D. Clayton (1993). Antebellum Natchez. Baton Rouge, Louisiana: Louisiana State Univ. Press. ISBN 978-0-8071-1860-3.
- Murray, Elizabeth Dunbar (1950). Early Romances of Historic Natchez (3rd ed.).
- Powell, Susie V., ed. (1938). Jefferson County (PDF). Source Material for Mississippi History, Volume XXXII, Part I. WPA Statewide Historical Research Project – via Mississippi Library Commission (mlc.lib.ms.us). This article incorporates text from this source, which is in the public domain.
- Rohrbough, Malcolm J. (1971) [1968]. The Land Office Business: The Settlement and Administration of American Public Lands, 1789–1837. Galaxy Book 354 (Paperback ed.). London: Oxford University Press. ISBN 978-0-19-501472-3. LCCN 68029725. OCLC 176589.
- Sparks, W. H. (1870). The Memories of Fifty Years: Containing Brief Biographical Notes of Distinguished Americans and Anecdotes of Remarkable Men. Philadelphia: Claxton, Remsen & Haffelfinger. hdl:loc.gdc/scd0001.00100906478. LCCN 06005624. OCLC 1048818176. OL 23365380M – via HathiTrust, copy digitized by Library of Congress. This article incorporates text from this source, which is in the public domain.
- Various; Davis, Jefferson (1974). McIntosh, James T. (ed.). The Papers of Jefferson Davis: June 1841–July 1846. Baton Rouge: Louisiana State University Press. ISBN 9780807158647. LCCN 76152704. OCLC 899262223. Project MUSE book 28573.
