= Harmon Runnels =

American soldier and politician (1753–1839)

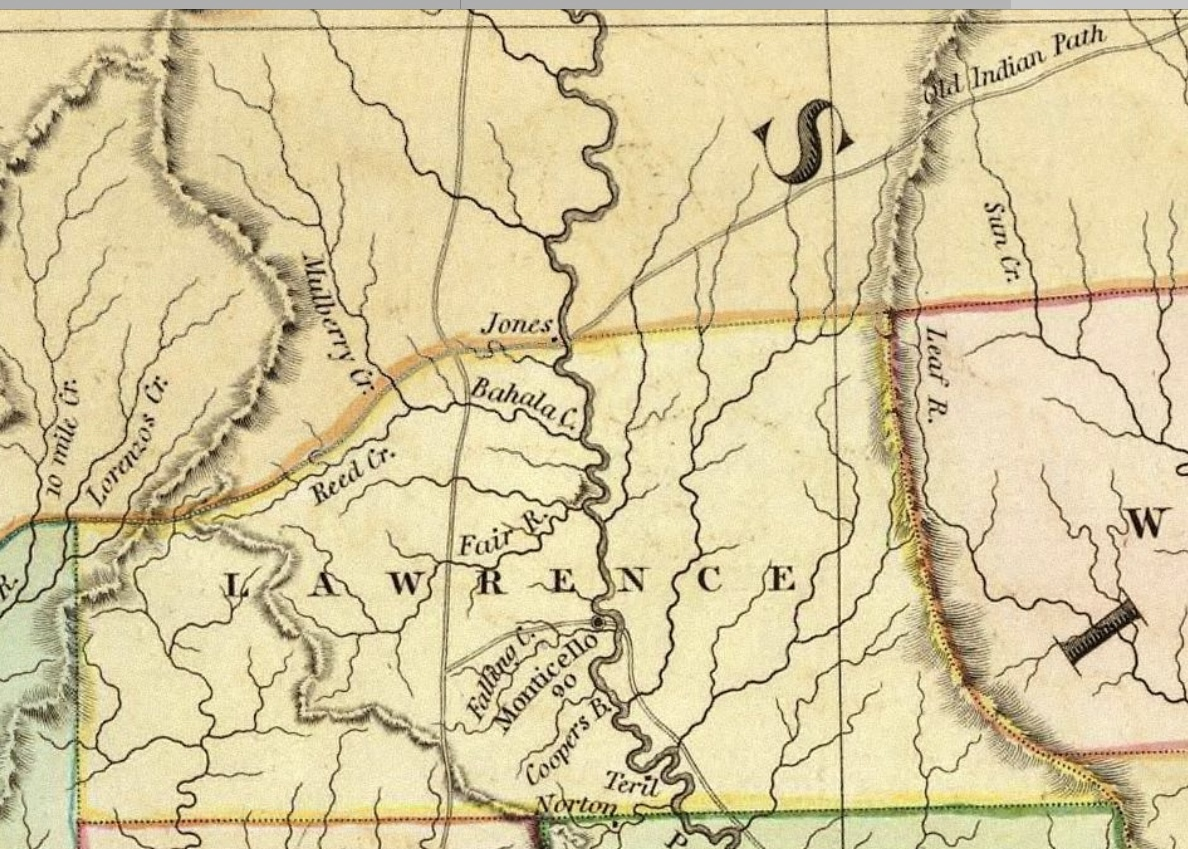
- Lawrence County, Mississippi and environs, including the "Old Indian Path" (Henry S. Tanner, 1824)
- Born: 1753; Colonial Georgia (?)
- Died: July 1839 (aged 85–86); Monticello, Mississippi, United States
- Other names: Bloody Shoe, Harman Runnels

Harmon Runnels (c. 1753 – July 1839) was a planter and politician of Georgia and Mississippi in the United States. A soldier in the American Revolutionary War, he was also involved in battles with indigenous people "on the frontier," and the Indians apparently called him Bloody Shoe. Runnels lived in Georgia before moving to the vicinity of Pearl River in southern Mississippi. He founded the town of Monticello, and represented Laurence County, Mississippi at the state constitutional convention of 1817. He served multiple terms in the Georgia and Mississippi state legislatures.

== Biography ==
Little is known of his early life, but a Runnels genealogist publishing in 1873 believed he was descended from the unnamed "older brother" of a 17th-century immigrant named Samuel Runnels. Said to be of Scotch ancestry, the brothers first settled in Nova Scotia. The older brother is believed to have settled somewhere in the Southern Colonies.

According to Dunbar Rowland, "He had been a fighting captain in the Continental Army and was a ready, forceful, strong character." Other accounts rank him as a colonel. Historian and partisan Jacksonian Democrat J. F. H. Claiborne, writing in the Natchez Free Trader in 1841 stated that Runnels was "engaged in several battles, and in two or three desperate affairs with the Tories. After the revolution and until his immigration to this Territory, he took a leading part in the border difficulties with the Indians and received from them, as the late Gen. Dale informed us, the title of Bloody-shoe."

His wife was Hannah Hubert, daughter of Benjamin Hubert, who was also a Continental soldier in the American Revolutionary War. Another account has him marrying a Miss Howell in 1785.

Runnels represented Clarke County, Georgia in the Georgia General Assembly in 1802, 1803, and 1804. They may have lived in Elbert County at one time because one of their sons was born there. According to a 20th-century history, while in Georgia he was a supporter of John Clark against George Troup "and when the latter triumphed and there was no longer any hope for Clark or his adherents, Colonel Runnels removed to the Pearl River Country." According to descendants who settled in Texas, "After 1801 when Harmon obtained a passport to cross the Creek Nation in Alabama, the Runnels and Darden families migrated to Mississippi, where Harmon founded the town of Monticello on the Pearl River." He most likely arrived via the Federal Road through the Muscogee lands that was extended to Natchez in 1807.

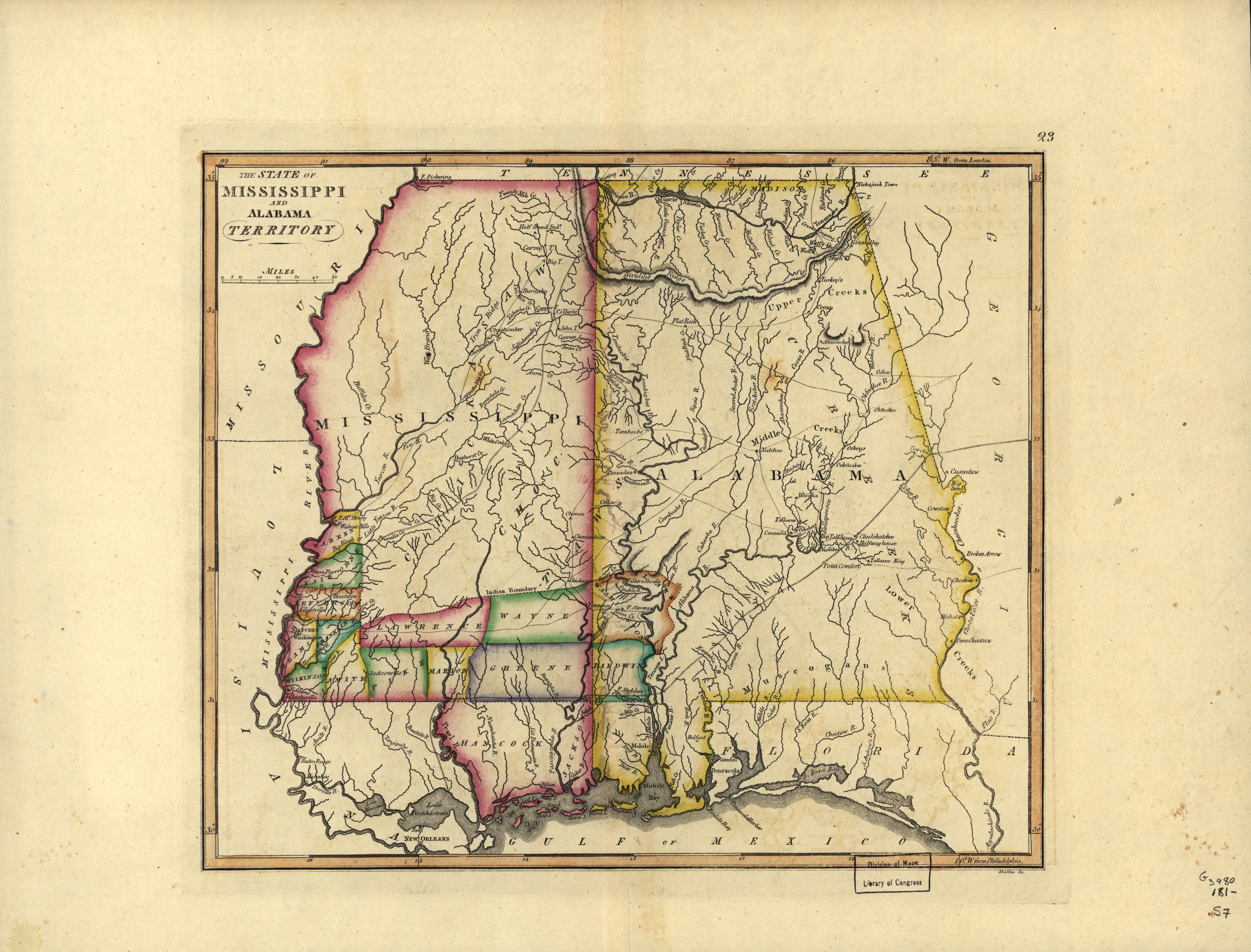
Mississippi Territory c. 1810 showing the Pearl River boundary between the toe of Louisiana and the heel of what is now the U.S. state of Mississippi

Runnels established the town of Monticello, Mississippi on the west bank of the Pearl in Lawrence County on 637 acres he purchased in 1811 for $1,275. He was remembered for "crossing the river on some driftwood near the bend where the L. H. Jones home now stands." After laying out the town and donating the land for the town square: "He was chief justice of the court in the county's first organization, which corresponded somewhat to the present position of president of the Board of Supervisors." In 1814 several members of the Runnels family signed a petition to Congress requesting a:

"...post road through the centere of the Mississippi Territory, to commence at the Chocktaw Agency at Pearl River, there intersecting the Nashvill rout, and thence to Montecello on said River, and then to intersect the Pinknevill route at Henry G. Nixons, which distance is about Ninety Miles, and will shorten the distance from New Orlands to Nashvill about one hundred and fifty Miles, this rout will lede through a rich country where there is a large quantity of land belong to the Mississippi Territory of the first quallity unsold yet."

Monticello is the Lawrence County seat, was reportedly state capital for one day in 1821, and made another failed run at the state capitalship in 1827. The settlement had its period of commercial success but by the time of the American Civil War was "composed of straggling, dilapidated houses and had not a single merchant."

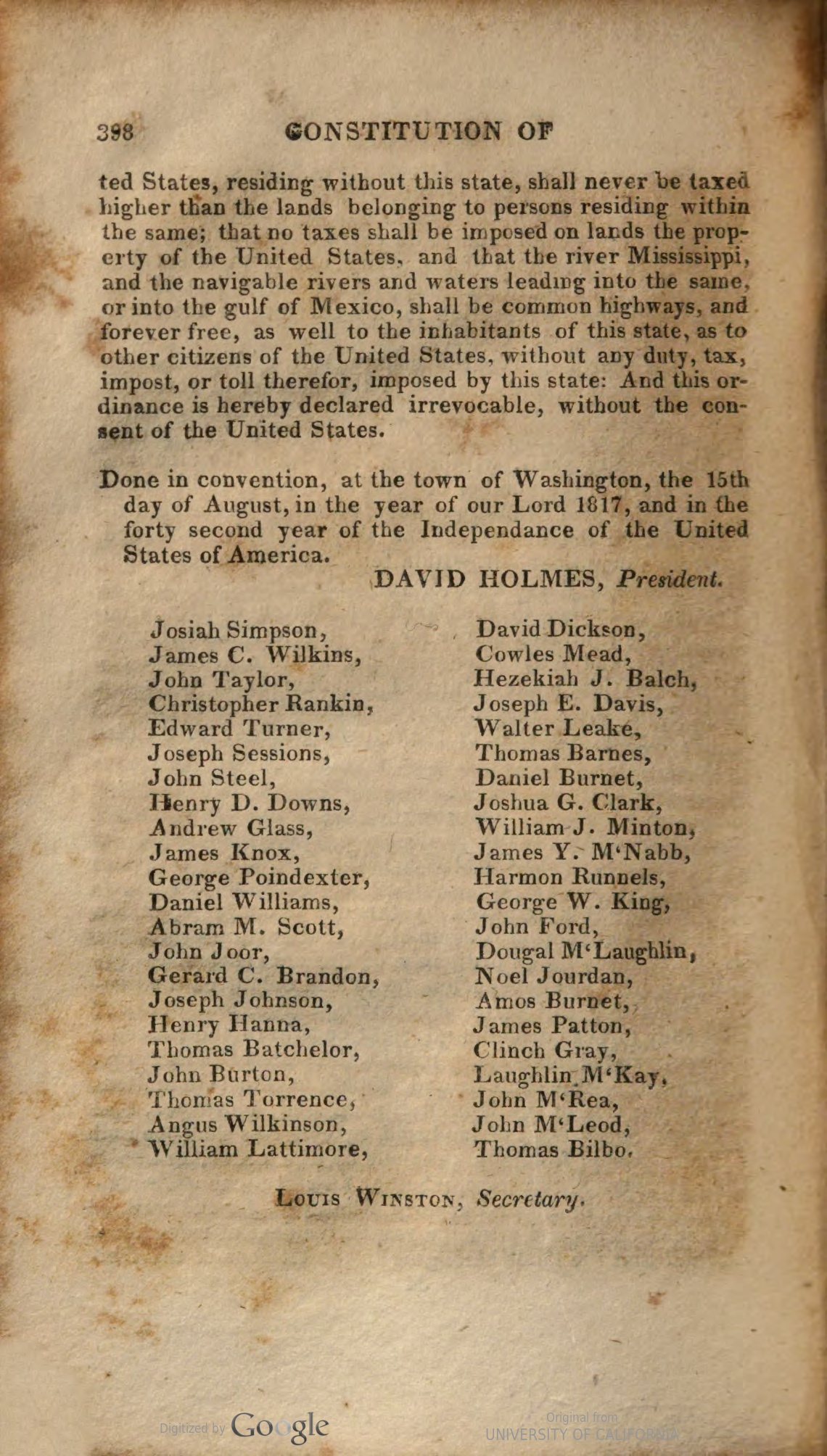
Signers of the 1817 Mississippi Constitution

Runnels served in the Mississippi Territorial Assembly in 1813, representing two jurisdictions in the vicinity of the Pearl: Marion County, and Hancock County, which was also bounded by the Gulf of Mexico. Runnels and either Shadrack King or George W. King represented Lawrence County at the first Mississippi state constitutional convention in 1817. He was politically aligned with the Jeffersonian Democrats. Claiborne framed this as him having a "strong practical sense and inflexible support of popular rights. He retained his activity and faculties to the last, and when past seventy, would canvass his county, mount his horse, and ride twenty miles before breakfast to address the people from the stump! We believe he was never defeated."

Claiborne also wrote a capsule biography of Runnels in his 1880 history of the state: "Harman Runnels the founder of the well-known Runnels family—had been a hard-fighting captain in Georgia, in the Continental army—had many a fight with the British Tories and Indians—was a Hard-shell Baptist—a devoted follower of Gen. Elisha Clark [sic]—was decidedly pugilistic in his temperament, and would fire up and fight, anybody and at any time, for a slur on his religion, his politics or his friend Clark. He had strong friends and bitter enemies, but he whipped the latter into submission, and with four sons to back him, (one of whom became Governor) as ready to fight as himself, he ruled the Pearl river country as long as he lived, and died an octogenarian, at Monticello, 'in the order of sanctity.' No truer patriot ever lived or died." The four sons were Hiram G. Runnels (a governor of Mississippi in the 1830s), Howell W. Runnels, Harmon M. Runnels, and Hardin D. Runnels. A local historian stated on the occasion of the 175th anniversary of Monticello's founding that Runnels was a "flaming patriot" and "the five of them together ran the whole area."

Following his death at home in or around July 1839, at the age of 86, he was buried with military honors. Runnels was a Baptist by religion. The residue of his estate consisted of "30 Negroes, one wagon, and three yokes of oxen."

== Sources ==
- Carter, Clarence Edwin, ed. (1937). Territorial Papers of the United States. Records of the U.S. Department of State. Vol. V: The Territory of Mississippi, 1798–1817. Washington, D.C.: U.S. Government Printing Office. Publication No. 1032 (E173 147).
- Claiborne, J. F. H. (1880). Mississippi, as a Province, Territory, and State: with Biographical Notices of Eminent Citizens. Jackson, Miss.: Power & Barksdale. LCCN 00002482. OCLC 2108221. OL 24156390M.
- ——— (1906) [1841]. "A Trip Through the Piney Woods". Publications of the Mississippi Historical Society. IX. Oxford, Mississippi: 487–538. ISSN 0885-792X. LCCN 10020861. OCLC 5110834.
- Magee, Hattie (1910). "Reconstruction in Lawrence and Jefferson Davis Counties". Publications of the Mississippi Historical Society. XI. Oxford, Mississippi: 163–204. ISSN 0885-792X. LCCN 10020861. OCLC 5110834.
- Rowland, Dunbar (1902). Mississippi's First Constitution and Its Makers. Harrisburg, Pennsylvania: Harrisburg Publishing Company. hdl:loc.gdc/scd0001.00145424781. LCCN 10007224.
- Powell, Susie V., ed. (1938). Lawrence County (PDF). Source Material for Mississippi History, Volume XXXIX. WPA Statewide Historical Research Project – via Mississippi Library Commission (mlc.lib.ms.us). This article incorporates text from this source, which is in the public domain.
- Runnels, M. T. (1873). A genealogy of Runnels and Reynolds families in America; with records and brief memorials of the earliest ancestors, as far as known, and many of their descendants, bearing the same and other names. Boston: A. Mudge & son, printer. LCCN 09013240. OCLC 3531308.
