= Charles B. Green (Mississippi politician) =

American lawyer and state legislator

Charles B. Green was a lawyer and state legislator in Mississippi. He served in the Mississippi Senate in 1820 and 1821 and in the Mississippi House of Representatives including as Speaker. He represented Adams County. He was involved in the debate over where to move the state capital. He was a candidate for governor in 1821 losing to Walter Leake by a wide margin. He also served in the Mississippi House of Representatives from Adams County in 1826 through 1829.

He became law partners with Christopher Rankin in 1816. He was Speaker of the Mississippi House when Gerard C. Brandon was governor and A. M. Scott Lieutenant Governor and President of the Mississippi Senate.

== See also ==
- 10th Mississippi Legislature
- 11th Mississippi Legislature
