= Hardin D. Runnels =

Mississippi state legislator (1789–1839)

- Born: May 31, 1789; Elbert County, Georgia
- Died: June 29, 1839 (aged 50); Madison County, Mississippi

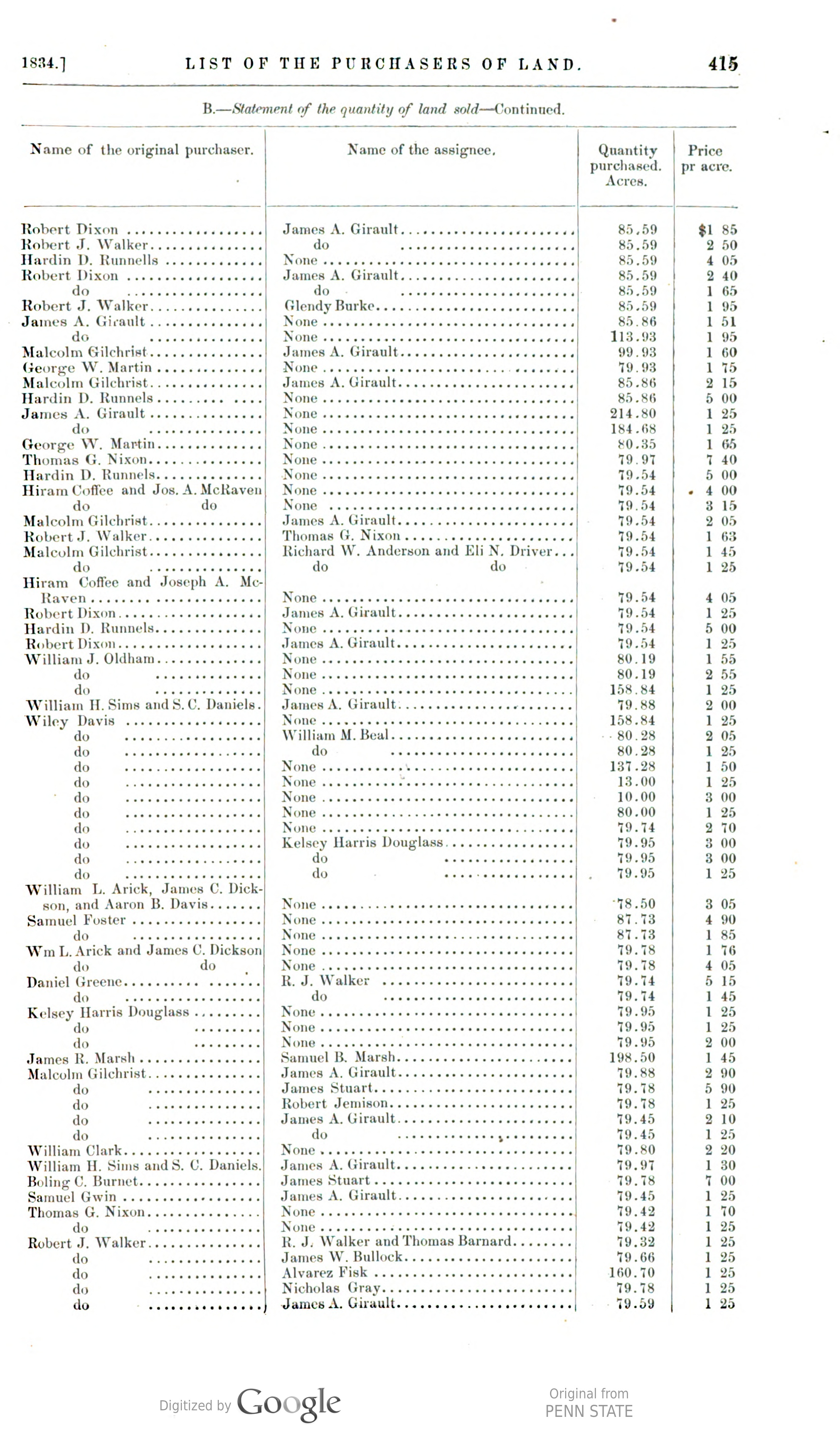
Statement of the quantity of land sold at the land office at Chocchuma, Mississippi, from the 1st October to the 31st December 1833, inclusive

Hardin Dudley Runnels (May 31, 1789 – June 29, 1839) was a Mississippi state Senator and a sheriff of Lawrence County, Mississippi, United States.

He was born in Georgia and moved to Mississippi Territory around 1809 where he served as a territorial officer. He was said to be less of his father Harmon Runnels' "temperament" than his brothers Hiram G. Runnels, and Howell W. Runnels.

In 1813 he was responsible for collecting taxes in the vicinity of what is now Lawrence and Marion counties. In 1814 he married Martha "Patsy" Burch Darden in Elbert County, Georgia.

In 1824 he was elected to the Mississippi State Senate from the district composed of Hinds, Yazoo, Copiah, and Jefferson counties.

In 1835 John H. McKennie testified before Congress that Hardin D. Runnels was part of a land company in partnership with Robert J. Walker, Thomas G. Ellis, Thomas Bernard, Franklin E. Plummer, Wiley Davis "and perhaps some others," all devoted to purchasing, though the Chocchuma land office, tracts of the newly opened lands recently appropriated from the Choctaw and Chickasaw.

Hardin Runnels fathered four sons: Edmond S. Runnels (b. 1816), Hiram A. (b. 1818), Hardin Richard Runnels (1820–1873), and Howell Washington Runnels Sr. (1823–1895). Hiram A. Runnels and Edmund S. Runnels attended the University of Alabama.

Hardin D. Runnels was visiting Texas with his family in 1839 when he fell ill, and he died shortly after returning to Mississippi. At the time of his death one of his brothers was president of Union Bank. The minister at his funeral service on the third Sabbath of September was Rev. Nathan Morris. His son Hardin Richard "Dick" Runnels moved to Texas after his death, along with his brothers and their widowed mother, and became a farmer and politician, elected governor of Texas in the 1850s. According to a 20th-century account, "at first they located in Central Texas, but later the widow and her sons moved to Red River County and purchased land a few miles northeast of Boston, now the county seat of Bowie County."

== Sources ==
- Powell, Susie V., ed. (1938). Lawrence County (PDF). Source Material for Mississippi History, Volume XXXIX. WPA Statewide Historical Research Project – via Mississippi Library Commission (mlc.lib.ms.us).
