= John Francis Hamtramck Claiborne =

American politician (1809–1884)

John F. H. Claiborne
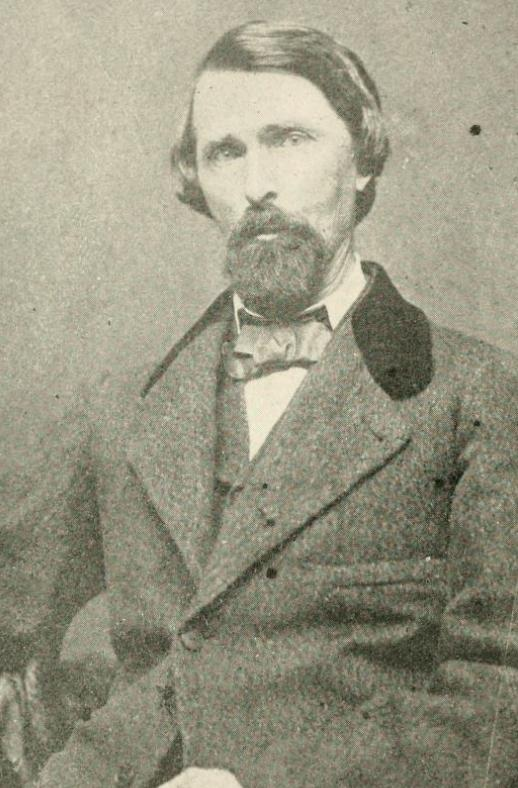

Member of the U.S. House of Representatives from Mississippi's at-large district
- In office March 4, 1835 – March 3, 1837
- Preceded by: Franklin E. Plummer
- Succeeded by: vacant

Member of the U.S. House of Representatives from Mississippi's at-large district
- In office July 18, 1837 – February 5, 1838
- Preceded by: vacant
- Succeeded by: vacant

Personal details
- Born: John Francis Hamtramck Claiborne; April 24, 1809 Natchez, Mississippi Territory
- Died: May 17, 1884 (aged 75) Natchez, Mississippi, U.S.
- Party: Democratic
- Spouse: Martha Dunbar
- Children: 3

John Francis Hamtramck Claiborne (April 24, 1809 – May 17, 1884) was a member of the U. S. House of Representatives from Mississippi. He published History of Mississippi in 1880.

== Biography ==
Claiborne was named after Jean François Hamtramck and was the son of Ferdinand Claiborne. He was also a nephew of William Charles Cole Claiborne and Nathaniel Herbert Claiborne, grandnephew of Thomas Claiborne, great-grandfather of Herbert Claiborne Pell, Jr., great-great-grandfather of Claiborne de Borda Pell, and great-great-grand-uncle of Corinne Claiborne Boggs.

He was born in Natchez, Mississippi (then Mississippi Territory) and attended school in Virginia, where he studied law. He was admitted to the bar in 1825, and commenced the practice of law at Natchez. He owned slaves. He was a member of the state House of Representatives from 1830 to 1834, then moved to Madison County, Mississippi, and was elected as a Jacksonian to the Twenty-fourth Congress, where he was a Representative from March 4, 1835 to March 3, 1837.

Claiborne presented credentials as a member-elect to the Twenty-fifth Congress and served from July 18, 1837, until February 5, 1838, when the seat was declared vacant as the result of a contested election. He then engaged in newspaper work in Natchez. In 1842, Claiborne served as a commissioner on the Choctaws Claim Commission which was set up to disperse land after the Treaty of Dancing Rabbit Creek. Claiborne was given his position on the commission due to the fact that he was owed $30,000 by William M. Gwin and Abram A. Halsey, who were also on the commission. Gwin and Halsey planned to give Claiborne 32,000 acres of Choctaw lands to cover their debts. The land deal was never completed and due to a public feud, Claiborne was removed from the commission. In 1844, he moved to New Orleans, Louisiana and resumed newspaper interests.

He owned more than 100 slaves and had a son killed in the Confederate Army but during the American Civil War he was a firm unionist and used his rock-ribbed Jacksonian background as a cover for what amounted to pro-Union espionage, informing local military commanders of smuggling operations and referring other intelligence assets to Washington.

He was appointed United States timber agent for Louisiana and Mississippi in 1853. He was the author of several historical works including his 1880 History of Mississippi.

He returned to his estate Dunbarton plantation near Natchez, and died there on May 17, 1884. He is buried in Trinity Churchyard, Natchez, Mississippi.

== Historical works ==
Morton Rothstein commented in a footnote on a paper about the Natchez nabobs that Claiborne's opinions "were not always trustworthy." Paul Wallace Gates once described Claiborne as a "jaundiced and thoroughly prejudiced historian." Charles S. Sydnor wrote that Claiborne's histories are important but show obvious and marked biases against historic opponents of his powerful family and against Mississippi Whig politicians of the early 19th century, including S. S. Prentiss and George Poindexter.

== See also ==
- Dunbarton plantation
