= Gerard Brandon =

American politician

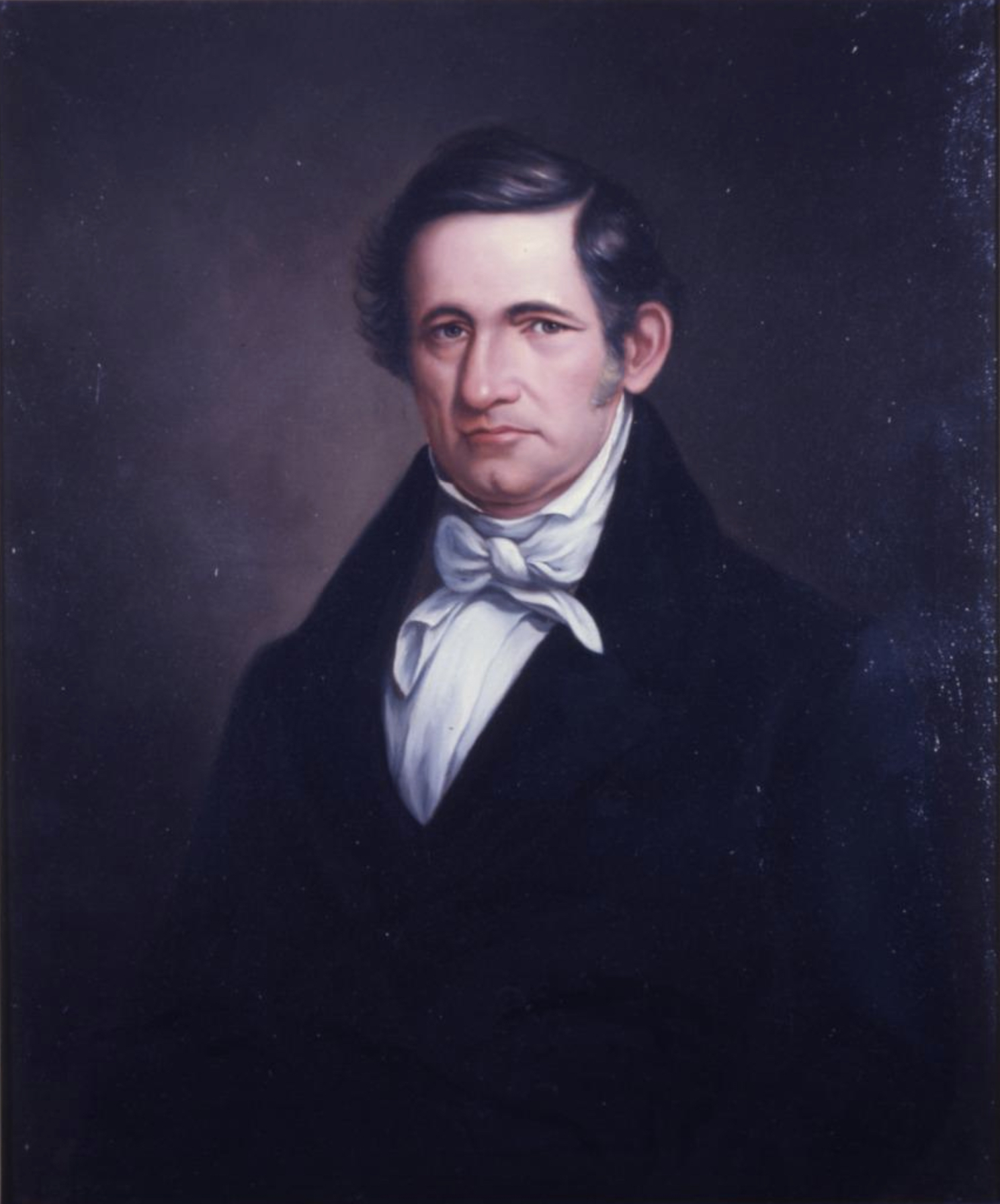

4th and 6th Governor of Mississippi
- In office July 25, 1826 – January 9, 1832
- Lieutenant: Vacant; Abram M. Scott
- Preceded by: David Holmes
- Succeeded by: Abram M. Scott
- In office November 17, 1825 – January 7, 1826
- Lieutenant: Vacant
- Preceded by: Walter Leake
- Succeeded by: David Holmes

4th Lieutenant Governor of Mississippi
- In office January 7, 1826 – July 25, 1826
- Governor: David Holmes
- Preceded by: Vacant
- Succeeded by: Abram M. Scott
- In office January 7, 1824 – November 17, 1825
- Governor: Walter Leake
- Preceded by: David Dickson
- Succeeded by: Vacant

4th Speaker of the Mississippi House of Representatives
- In office 1822
- Preceded by: B. R. Grayson
- Succeeded by: Cowles Mead

Personal details
- Born: Gerard Chittocque Brandon; September 15, 1788 Natchez, Mississippi Territory
- Died: March 28, 1850 (aged 61) Fort Adams, Mississippi, U.S.
- Resting place: Columbian Springs Plantation, Wilkinson County, Mississippi
- Education: Princeton University; College of William & Mary

Gerard Chittocque Brandon (September 15, 1788 – March 28, 1850) was an American political leader who twice served as Governor of Mississippi during its early years of statehood. He was the first native-born governor of Mississippi. He was a delegate to the constitutional conventions of 1817 and 1832. He served as Speaker of the Mississippi House of Representatives in 1822. As Lieutenant Governor of Mississippi he served as President of the Mississippi Senate. When Walter Leake died in 1825 he became governor. He also succeeded David Holmes who resigned in 1826 due to ill health. He was elected to the office in 1827 and again in 1829. Brandon, Mississippi is named for him.

== Early life and education ==
Gerard Brandon was the son of an Irish immigrant, Gerard Chittocque Brandon, who established and ran the Selma Plantation in Adams County, Mississippi, and Dorothy Nugent, the daughter of Irish immigrants Matthew Nugent and Isabel MacBray. The couple moved to Mississippi from South Carolina sometime in 1785.

Brandon was born September 15, 1788, in Natchez, in the Territory of Mississippi, the second child and first son of the family. He was educated at Princeton University and the College of William & Mary and served in the War of 1812. He later practiced law at Washington, Mississippi and was a successful planter, following his father's footsteps, in Adams County, Mississippi.

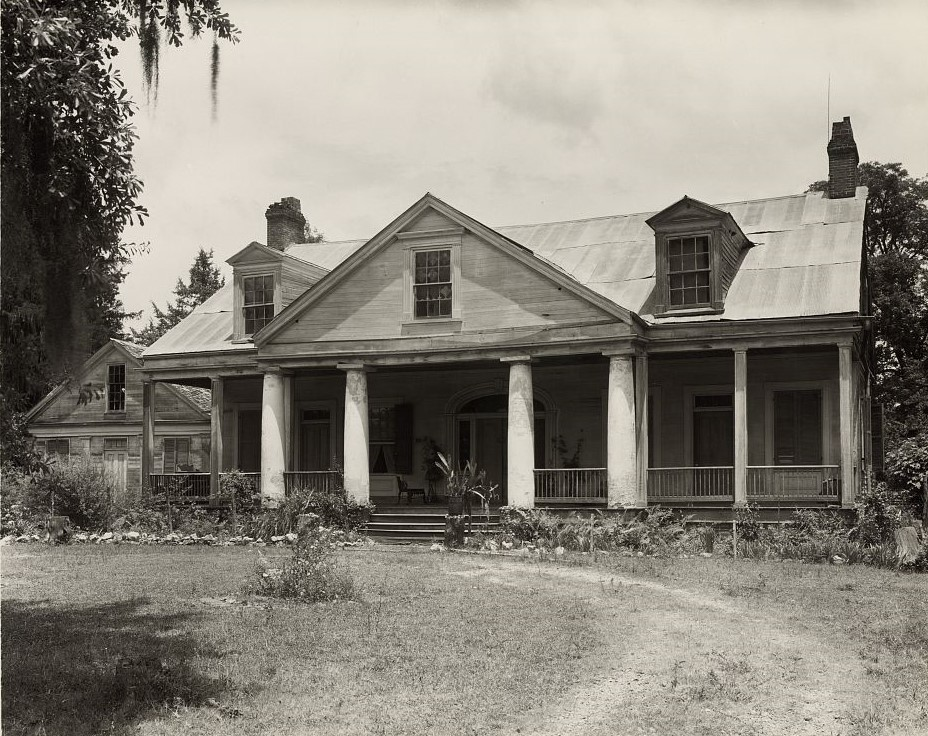
Windy Hill Manor, by Frances Benjamin Johnston, 1938

He married Margaret Chambers on January 18, 1816, in Bardstown, Kentucky. In 1817 Gerard Brandon bought Windy Hill Manor. At his death, Windy Hill Manor was inherited by his daughter, Elizabeth, who married William Stanton. Elizabeth and William's descendants lived at Windy Hill Manor until the 1940s. The last in the line were three unmarried sisters, Elizabeth, Maude, and Beatrice. When the last sister died in 1945, the house sat abandoned until 1965, when it was demolished.

After Margaret Chambers's death in June 1820, Gerard Brandon married Betsy Stanton on July 12, 1824, in Adams County, Mississippi. The governor had a total of eight children with his two wives.

Brandon died at 61 on March 28, 1850, and was buried in a private family cemetery at his Columbian Springs Plantation in Wilkinson County, Mississippi.

A slaveholder himself, he said he considered slavery an evil; his son, however, possessed a fortune in human property, including the kidnapped Henrietta Wood.

== Political life ==
Brandon, a delegate to the constitutional conventions of 1817 and 1832, helped draft Mississippi's first two constitutions. He served in the Mississippi Legislature and was elected Speaker of the House of Representatives in 1822.

In 1825, Brandon became governor of Mississippi for the first time upon the death of Walter Leake, serving from Leake's death on November 17, 1825, until January 7, 1826, when David Holmes, the last territorial governor and first governor of the State of Mississippi was again inaugurated as governor.

Brandon became acting governor of Mississippi again on July 25, 1826 when Governor David Holmes resigned due to ill health. Brandon served until January 9, 1832, being reelected in the 1827 election and 1829 election.

Gerard Brandon served as governor during an era known as the "Flush Times," an era of expanded settlement and development in Mississippi and the surrounding areas. During his administration, the finalization of two Indian land sessions opened millions of acres of land to settlement, beginning the development of the cotton industry that would define Mississippi's economy in the coming years. Governor Brandon oversaw the expansion of transportation in the infrastructure to connect the new agricultural land, as well as the construction of public schools and the chartering of Mississippi's first railroad.

During Brandon's administration, political and economic changes, including the creation of several new counties (Washington, Madison, Rankin, and Lowndes) and the expansion of suffrage to all white males, induced the populace to vote in favor of a constitutional convention to replace Mississippi's Constitution of 1817.

After his term as governor ended, Brandon served as a delegate to the 1831 Constitutional Convention for Adams County. He then lived as a private citizen until his death in 1850.

Brandon, Mississippi, the county seat of Rankin County, is named after Gerard Brandon.

Political offices
Preceded by David Dickson	Lieutenant Governor of Mississippi; 1824–1826	Succeeded by Abram M. Scott
Preceded by Vacant	Lieutenant Governor of Mississippi; 1826	Succeeded by Vacant
Preceded by Walter Leake	Governor of Mississippi; 1825–1826	Succeeded by David Holmes
Preceded by David Holmes	Governor of Mississippi; 1826–1832	Succeeded by Abram M. Scott
