= Thomas Freeland =

American politician

Thomas Freeland was a state legislator and delegate to the 1832 Mississippi Constitutional Convention in Mississippi. He served as state senator representing Claiborne County from 1823 to 1829 except in 1827 when Daniel Burnett held the office.

He was a plantation owner who had 70 slaves in 1856 and served as an election inspector. He helped found Oakland College.
