= Adam Lewis Bingaman =

American politician (1793–1869)

Adam L. Bingaman
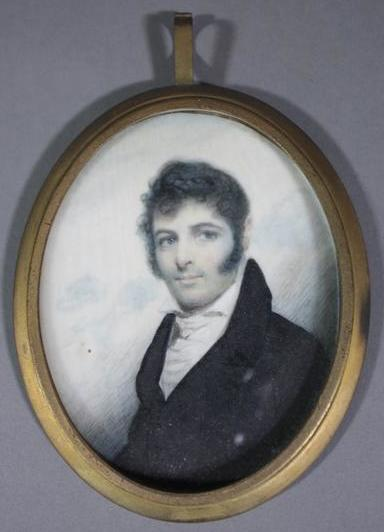
- Born: February 11, 1793
- Died: September 6, 1869 (aged 76)

Adam Lewis "A.L." Bingaman (February 11, 1793 – September 6, 1869) was an American politician. He held the top offices of both houses of the Mississippi Legislature: was the President of the Mississippi State Senate from 1838 to 1840, and the Speaker of the Mississippi House of Representatives from 1834 to 1836.

== Early life ==
Bingaman was born at Bayou Sara, Louisiana, a son of Catherine Surget and Adam Bingaman, a wealthy planter who served on the legislative council of Mississippi Territory during the John Adams administration. Bingaman studied law in Massachusetts, graduating with a bachelor of arts, Harvard University, class of 1812. While at Harvard, by arrangement, Adam lived in Boston with the sister of Winthrop Sargent (former Governor of the Mississippi Territory). Judith Sargent Murray, Winthrop's sister, was a highly regarded feminist essayist, poet, and playwright, whose husband, John Murray, was the founder of organized Universalism in America. Adam was drawn to their daughter, Julia Maria Murray, and the two married secretly before Adam was called home to Natchez. Many months went by without word from Adam, but when Julia Maria gave birth to their daughter, Charlotte, Winthrop Sargent intervened with the Bingaman family in Natchez and Adam was directed to Boston and returned with his wife and child. By then, John Murray had died. Not wanting to part with her daughter and granddaughter, Judith Sargent Murray also relocated to Natchez—just when her young cousin Henrietta Sargent, Lydia Maria Child, and other Boston abolitionists were starting to incorporate Judith's political essays into their own arguments for equality.

== Plantation life ==
Murray, her daughter, and granddaughter went to live at Fatherland, the Bingaman family plantation in Natchez, Mississippi. Life on the plantation was privileged. The noted race horse, Lexington was stabled at the Bingaman plantation while being trained by John Benjamin Pryor, the horse trainer at the top of his field. Bingaman was a slaveholder, holding 230 slaves in 1850 and 310 in 1860. Bingaman had a relationship with a free black woman, Mary E. Williams, and may have fathered as many as six children: Frances Ann, wife of Pryor; Cordelia, Emilie, Marie Sophie Charlotte, James and Henriette.

== Orator and political life ==
As a member of the Mississippi House of Representatives in 1833, Bingaman headed a select committee during the Nullification Crisis that preceded the American Civil War. He served as the president of the State Senate from 1838 to 1840. Bingaman was described by his peers as "a man of rare qualifications for a popular leader, being gifted by nature in mind and personal appearance (which was most dignified and commanding), with a polished education and fascinating manners; he was a natural orator." After Charles Lynch was elected governor of Mississippi, Bingaman read Lynch's inaugural speech to the Mississippi Assembly. Bingaman's reputation as an orator was heightened by his speech to General Andrew Jackson during his visit to Natchez in January 1840.
