= Fountain Winston =

American politician

Fountain Winston (November 3, 1793 – December 1, 1834) was an American politician from Mississippi.

== Biography ==
Born in Germanton, North Carolina as a son of U.S. Representative Joseph Winston, a brother of Mississippi Supreme Court justice Louis L. Winston, and brother-in-law of Robert Williams, another North Carolina Representative.

Winston served as a member of Mississippi Senate from 1826 to 1830. He was the sixth Lieutenant Governor of Mississippi in 1832 under Governor Abram M. Scott. He was the last to hold the office of lieutenant governor, which was eliminated under a revised state constitution, and was not reinstated until passage of Mississippi's post-Civil War constitution in 1869. Winston served again in the Mississippi Senate in 1833.

Winston died in Natchez, Mississippi on December 1, 1834.

Political offices
Preceded by Abram M. Scott	Lieutenant Governor of Mississippi; 1832	Succeeded by Office abolished
