= List of United States senators in the 21st Congress =

This is a complete list of United States senators during the 21st United States Congress listed by seniority from March 4, 1829, to March 3, 1831.

Order of service is based on the commencement of the senator's first term. Behind this is former service as a senator (only giving the senator seniority within their new incoming class), service as vice president, a House member, a cabinet secretary, or a governor of a state. The final factor is the population of the senator's state.

Senators who were sworn in during the middle of the two-year congressional term (up until the last senator who was not sworn in early after winning the November 1830 election) are listed at the end of the list with no number.

== Terms of service ==
Class	Terms of service of senators that expired in years
Class 3	Terms of service of senators that expired in 1831 (AL, CT, GA, IL, IN, KY, LA, MD, MO, NC, NH, NY, OH, PA, SC, and VT.)
Class 1	Terms of service of senators that expired in 1833 (CT, DE, IN, MA, MD, ME, MO, MS, NJ, NY, OH, PA, RI, TN, VA, and VT.)
Class 2	Terms of service of senators that expired in 1835 (AL, DE, GA, IL, KY, LA, MA, ME, MS, NC, NH, NJ, RI, SC, TN, and VA.)

== U.S. Senate seniority list ==
U.S. Senate seniority
Rank	Senator (party-state)	Seniority date	Other factors
1	Benjamin Ruggles (AJ-OH)	March 4, 1815	
2	James Noble (AJ-IN)	December 11, 1816	
3	Mahlon Dickerson (J-NJ)	March 4, 1817	
4	William Rufus de Vane King (J-AL)	December 14, 1819	
5	Nehemiah Rice Knight (AJ-RI)	January 9, 1821	
6	Horatio Seymour (AJ-VT)	March 4, 1821	Vermont 15th in population (1810)
7	David Barton (AJ-MO)	August 10, 1821	Alphabetical (Ba)
8	Thomas Hart Benton (J-MO)	August 10, 1821	Alphabetical (Be)
9	John Henry Eaton (J-TN)	September 27, 1821	
10	Samuel Smith (J-MD)	December 17, 1822	
11	Samuel Bell (AJ-NH)	March 4, 1823	Former governor; New Hampshire 15th in population (1820)
12	Robert Young Hayne (J-NH)	March 4, 1823	
13	Josiah Stoddard Johnston (AJ-LA)	January 15, 1824	
14	Littleton Waller Tazewell (J-VA)	December 7, 1824	
15	Dudley Chase (AJ-VT)	March 4, 1825	Former senator
16	William Hendricks (AJ-IN)	March 4, 1825	Former representative (5 years)
17	John Rowan (J-KY)	March 4, 1825	Former representative (2 years)
18	William Marks (AJ-PA)	March 4, 1825	Pennsylvania 2nd in population (1820)
19	John Macpherson Berrien (J-GA)	March 4, 1825	Georgia 11th in population (1820)
20	Elias Kent Kane (J-IL)	March 4, 1825	Illinois 24th in population (1820)
21	Levi Woodbury (J-NH)	March 16, 1825	
22	Calvin Willey (AJ-CT)	May 4, 1825	
23	Hugh Lawson White (J-TN)	October 28, 1825	
24	Ashur Robbins (AJ-RI)	October 31, 1825	
25	Nathan Sanford (AJ-NY)	January 14, 1826	
26	Ezekiel Forman Chambers (AJ-VA)	January 24, 1826	
27	Nathaniel Silsbee (AJ-MA)	May 31, 1826	
28	John McKinley (J-AL)	November 27, 1826	
29	William Smith (DR-SC)	November 29, 1826	
30	Powhatan Ellis (J-MS)	March 4, 1827	Former senator
31	Louis McLane (J-DE)	March 4, 1827	Former representative (10 years)
32	John Tyler (J-VA)	March 4, 1827	Former representative (4 years, 2 months)
33	Samuel Augustus Foot (AJ-CT)	March 4, 1827	Former representative (4 years, 0 months)
34	Isaac Dutton Barnard (J-PA)	March 4, 1827	
35	Daniel Webster (AJ-MA)	June 8, 1827	
36	Jacob Burnet (AJ-OH)	December 10, 1828	
37	James Iredell (J-NC)	December 15, 1828	
38	John Holmes (AJ-ME)	January 15, 1829	Former representative
39	Charles Edward Dudley (J-NY)	January 15, 1829	
40	George Mortimer Bibb (J-KY)	March 4, 1829	Former senator (3 years)
41	George Michael Troup (J-GA)	March 4, 1829	Former senator (1 year, 10 months)
42	Thomas Buck Reed (J-MS)	March 4, 1829	Former senator (1 year, 2 months)
43	John McLean (J-IL)	March 4, 1829	Former senator (3 months)
44	Edward Livingston (J-LA)	March 4, 1829	Former representative (12 years)
45	Peleg Sprague (AJ-ME)	March 4, 1829	Former representative (4 years)
46	Theodore Frelinghuysen (AJ-NJ)	March 4, 1829	New Jersey 13th in population (1820)
47	John Middleton Clayton (AJ-DE)	March 4, 1829	Delaware 22nd in population (1820)
	Felix Grundy (J-TN)	October 19, 1829	
	John Forsyth (J-GA)	November 9, 1829	
	Bedford Brown (J-NC)	December 9, 1829	
	Robert Huntington Adams (J-MS)	January 6, 1830	
	Arnold Naudain (AJ-DE)	January 13, 1830	
	George Poindexter (J-MS)	October 15, 1830	
	David Jewett Baker (D-IL)	November 12, 1830	
	John McCracken Robinson (J-IL)	December 11, 1830	

== See also ==
- 21st United States Congress
- List of United States representatives in the 21st Congress
