= 1819 United States House of Representatives election in Mississippi =

- August 2, 1819
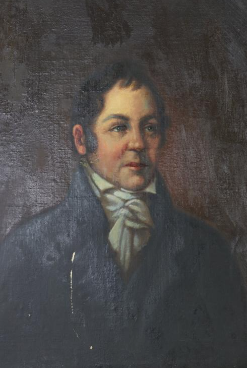
Nominee	Christopher Rankin	Cowles Mead
Party	Democratic-Republican	Democratic-Republican
Popular vote	2,769	1,250
Percentage	68.88%	31.09%
- County results Rankin: 70–80% 80–90% >90% Mead: 50–60% 60–70%
U.S. Representative before election
George Poindexter
Democratic-Republican
Elected U.S. Representative
Christopher Rankin
Democratic-Republican

The 1819 United States House of Representatives election in Mississippi took place on August 2, 1819, to choose who would represent Mississippi's at-large congressional district in the United States House of Representatives.

Incumbent George Poindexter did not seek reelection. Christopher Rankin, a Democratic-Republican, defeated fellow party member Cowles Mead to represent Mississippi in the 16th Congress of the United States.

== Background ==
Mississippi's first U.S. House of Representatives elections, held in 1817, were won by George Poindexter uncontested. As a representative, Poindexter served as the chairman of the Committee on Public Lands. Poindexter did not contest this election in order to run for the gubernatorial election.

== Candidates ==
In an April 13, 1819, edition of the Mississippi Free Trader, three candidates for the office were announced: former territorial legislator and attorney Christopher Rankin, Secretary of State of Mississippi Daniel Williams, and former territorial legislator and attorney Cowles Mead, although Williams was not listed in subsequent candidate listings.

== General election ==
Mississippi voters cast their ballots on August 2, 1819, to elect a new representative in Congress. Rankin won 2,769 votes, or 68.88% of the vote share, while Mead won 1,250 votes, or 31.09% of the share. Although Poindexter did not run for reelection, one Adams County voter voted for him.

Mississippi United States House of Representatives election, 1819
Party	Candidate	Votes	%
Democratic-Republican	Christopher Rankin	2,769	68.88
Democratic-Republican	Cowles Mead	1,250	31.09
Democratic-Republican	George Poindexter	1	0.03
Total votes		4,020	100.00

== Aftermath ==
Secretary of State Daniel Williams certified the election results on September 21, 1819.

This election marked the beginning of Rankin's seven years as Mississippi's at-large representative, being re-elected four times until his death in 1826. During his service, Rankin served as the chairman of the Committee on Public Lands.

== See also ==
- 1818 and 1819 United States House of Representatives elections
- List of United States representatives from Mississippi
