= 1817 United States House of Representatives election in Mississippi =

- September 1–2, 1817
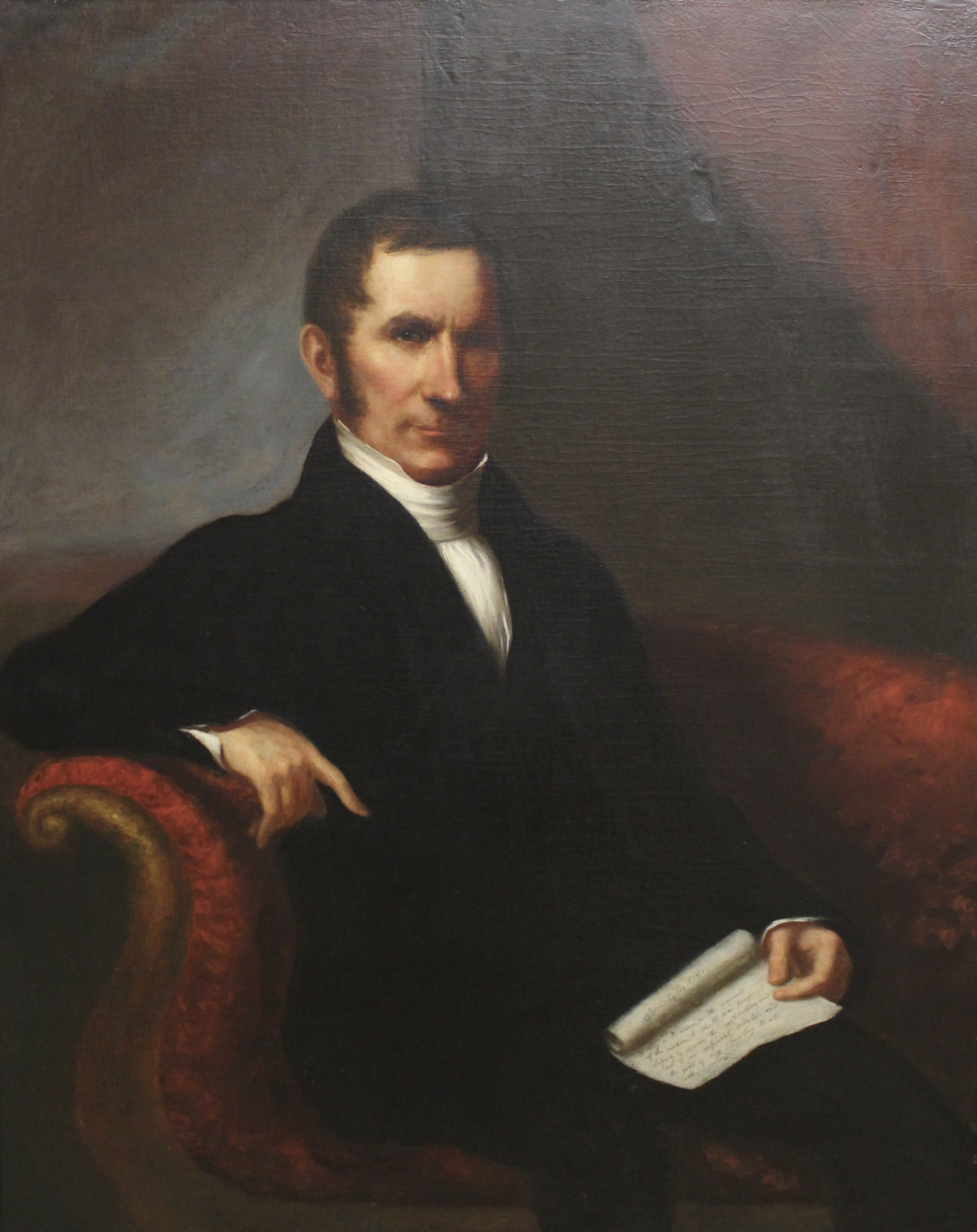
Nominee	George Poindexter
Party	Democratic-Republican
Popular vote	3,142
Percentage	99.81%
- County results Poindexter: 90–100%
Elected U.S. Representative
George Poindexter
Democratic-Republican

The 1817 United States House of Representatives election in Mississippi took place on September 1–2, 1817, to choose who would represent Mississippi's at-large congressional district in the United States House of Representatives.

The election came after the Constitution of Mississippi was ratified by the new state's constitution convention and a statewide election was called for September. George Poindexter, a Democratic-Republican who was a high-ranking delegate at the convention, ran unopposed and won the election with 99.81% of the vote.

== Background ==
On March 1, 1817, president James Madison approved legislation enabling the western portion of the Mississippi Territory to develop a constitution and state government, which would then be granted statehood when formed. A 48-member constitutional convention was formed and held their first meeting on July 7, 1817, in Washington, Mississippi.

On August 15, after over a month of deliberation, the new constitution was signed by the convention in Natchez. The convention also decided that the first election in the soon-to-be-admitted state would be held on the first Monday and Tuesday of September 1817. Among the roles to be decided on by voters was Mississippi's representative to the United States House of Representatives.

== Candidates ==
George Poindexter, the chairman of the committee responsible for drafting the state constitution, was tabbed as the Democratic-Republican Party candidate for U.S. representative soon after the convention had concluded.

== General election ==
Poindexter won the election, amassing 3,142 votes across the state. Although sources such as the National Intelligencer reported that "there (appeared) to be no opposition" during the election, results show that Christopher Rankin, who unsuccessfully ran for a United States Senate seat during the same round of elections, totaled six votes, spoiling a unanimous total for Poindexter.

Mississippi United States House of Representatives election, 1817
Party	Candidate	Votes	%
Democratic-Republican	George Poindexter	3,142	99.81
Democratic-Republican	Christopher Rankin	6	0.19
Total votes		3,148	100.00

== Aftermath ==
Poindexter assumed his seat on December 15, 1817, serving as a member of the 15th United States Congress until March 3, 1819. During that time, he served as the chairman of the Committee on Public Lands. Poindexter did not run again in the 1819 election, opting to run for Governor of Mississippi instead.

== See also ==
- 1816 and 1817 United States House of Representatives elections
- List of United States representatives from Mississippi
