= Thomas Buck Reed =

American politician

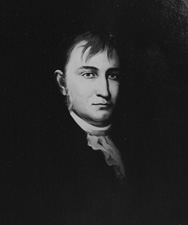

United States Senator from Mississippi
- In office March 4, 1829 – November 26, 1829
- Preceded by: Thomas H. Williams
- Succeeded by: Robert H. Adams
- In office January 28, 1826 – March 3, 1827
- Preceded by: Powhatan Ellis
- Succeeded by: Powhatan Ellis

Attorney General of Mississippi
- In office 1821–1825
- Governor: George Poindexter; Walter Leake; Gerard Brandon
- Preceded by: Edward Turner
- Succeeded by: Richard Stockton

Personal details
- Born: May 7, 1787 Lexington, Kentucky
- Died: November 26, 1829 (aged 42) Lexington, Kentucky, US
- Party: Jacksonian

Thomas Buck Reed (May 7, 1787 – November 26, 1829) was a United States senator from Mississippi.

== Biography ==
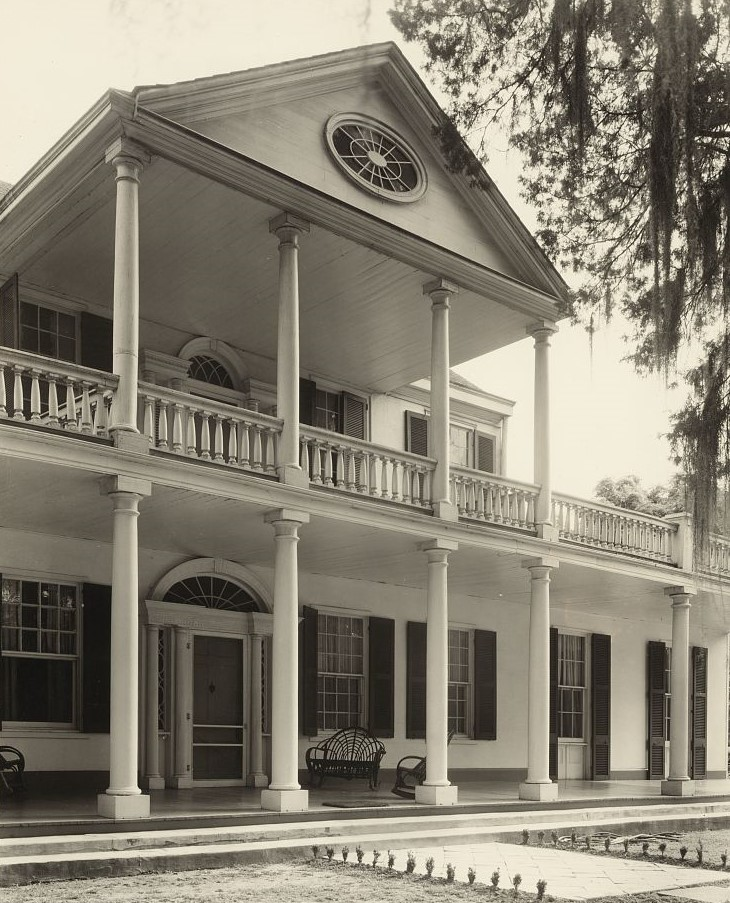
Linden, by Frances Benjamin Johnston, 1938. Builder is not known but Thomas B. Reed is known as the first occupant. In 1840, Linden was purchased by Mrs. Janr Gustine Connor, great-grandmother of present owner

=== Early life ===
Thomas Buck Reed was born on May 7, 1787, near Lexington, Kentucky. He attended the public schools and the College of New Jersey (now Princeton University.) He studied law and was admitted to the bar.

=== Career ===
He commenced legal practice in Lexington in 1808. In 1809, he moved to Natchez, Mississippi, and served as a city clerk in 1811. He was an unsuccessful candidate for Delegate to Congress in 1813, and was attorney general of Mississippi from 1821 to 1826. His party affiliation was Jacksonian.

In 1825, he was elected to the Mississippi House of Representatives but declined to take his seat; he was elected to the U.S. Senate to fill the vacancy caused by the resignation of David Holmes and served from January 28, 1826, to March 3, 1827. He was an unsuccessful candidate for reelection in 1827, but was again elected to the Senate in 1828 and served from March 4, 1829.

=== Personal life ===
He married Margaret Allison Ross, the daughter of plantation owner Isaac Ross.

=== Death ===
He died on November 26, 1829, in Lexington, Kentucky.

== See also ==
- List of members of the United States Congress who died in office (1790–1899)

Legal offices
| Preceded by Edward Turner | Attorney General of Mississippi; 1821–1825 | Succeeded by Richard Stockton |
U.S. Senate
| Preceded by Powhatan Ellis | U.S. senator (Class 1) from Mississippi; 1826–1827; Served alongside: Thomas H. Williams | Succeeded by Powhatan Ellis |
| Preceded by Thomas H. Williams | U.S. senator (Class 2) from Mississippi; 1829; Served alongside: Powhatan Ellis | Succeeded by Robert H. Adams |
