= 7th Mississippi Legislature =

1823 to 1824 legislative session

←	6th Mississippi Legislature	8th Mississippi Legislature	→

Overview
- Legislative body: Mississippi Legislature
- Jurisdiction: Mississippi, United States
- Term: December 22, 1823 – January 23, 1824

Mississippi State Senate
- President: David C. Dickson (until January 7, 1824); Gerard C. Brandon (after January 7, 1824)

Mississippi House of Representatives
- Speaker: Cowles Mead

Sessions
- 1st: December 22, 1823 – January 23, 1824

The 7th Mississippi Legislature met between December 22, 1823, and January 22, 1824, in Jackson, Mississippi. The Senate adjourned on January 22, 1824, and the House adjourned on January 23, 1824. Some elections were held in August 1823.

== Senate ==
In the August 1823 elections, Freeland, Joor, Bingaman, and Herbert were elected to three-year terms from the shown districts. David Dickson, the Lieutenant Governor of Mississippi, served ex officio as President of the Senate. John Burton was elected Secretary of the Senate, and Joseph Peirce was elected Door-Keeper. On January 7, 1824, Gerard C. Brandon was sworn in as the new Lieutenant Governor and replaced Dickson as president.

County District	Name of Senator
Adams	Adam Bingaman
Wilkinson	John Joor
Warren, Claiborne	Thomas Freeland
Jackson, Hancock, Green, Perry	Laughlin McKay
Lawrence	William Herbert
Wayne, Covington, Monroe	Bartlet C. Barry
Amite, Franklin	John R. Brown
?	Mr. Spencer

== House ==
Thirty-four members of the House were elected. Cowles Mead was elected Speaker of the House. Non-representatives P. A. Vandorn and Dillard Collins were elected Clerk and Door-Keeper respectively.

County	Name of Representative
Adams	John Snodgrass
Adams	George Dougherty
Adams (Natchez)	Fountain Winston
Amite	Francis Graves
Amite	David Davis
Amite	Richard Hurst
Bainbridge	William Reed
Claiborne	William Briscoe
Claiborne	David D. Downing
Copiah	William Tullis
Covington	John Evans
Franklin	Bailey E. Chainey
Franklin	Jesse Guice
Green	John McLeod
Hancock	Jesse Depew
Hinds	Samuel M. Puckett
Jackson	Thomas Bilbo
Jefferson	Cowles Mead
Jefferson	Robert Dunbar
Lawrence	Jesse Winburn
Lawrence	James H. Bull
Lawrence	John Ragan
Marion	John H. Norton
Monroe	Christopher H. Williams
Perry	David Reese
Pike	David Cleveland
Pike	William Dickson
Pike	Wiley P. Harris
Warren	James Gibson
Wayne	William A. Lang
Wayne	Edmund Gray
Wilkinson	Joseph Johnson
Wilkinson	George Poindexter
Wilkinson	Edward McGehee
Yazoo	Andrew Batey
