= 1823 Mississippi gubernatorial election =

- August 4, 1823
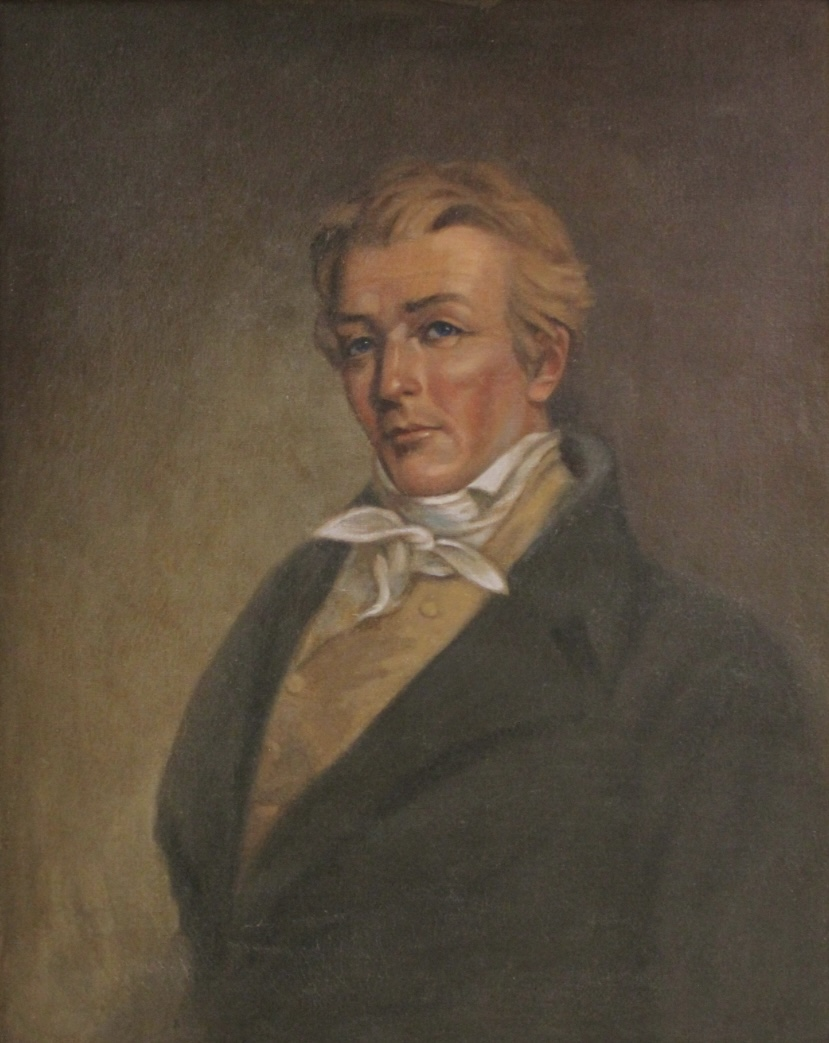

Nominee	Walter Leake	David Dickson	William Lattimore
Party	Democratic-Republican	Democratic-Republican	Democratic-Republican
Popular vote	3,996	2,511	1,986
Percentage	47.05%	29.57%	23.38%
- County results Leake: 30–40% 40–50% 50–60% 60–70% 70–80% 80–90% Dickson: 50–60% 60–70% 80–90% Lattimore: 50–60% No votes
Governor before election
Walter Leake
Democratic-Republican
Elected Governor
David Holmes
Democratic-Republican

The 1823 Mississippi gubernatorial election was held on August 4, 1823, to elect the governor of Mississippi. Walter Leake, a Democratic-Republican incumbent, won against David Dickson and William Lattimore, two other Democratic Republicans.

== Results ==
Mississippi gubernatorial election, 1823
Party	Candidate	Votes	%
Democratic-Republican	Walter Leake (incumbent)	3,996	47.05%
Democratic-Republican	David Dickson	2,511	29.57%
Democratic-Republican	William Lattimore	1,986	23.38%
Total votes		8,493	100.00
Democratic-Republican hold			
