= 1825 Mississippi gubernatorial election =

- August 1, 1825
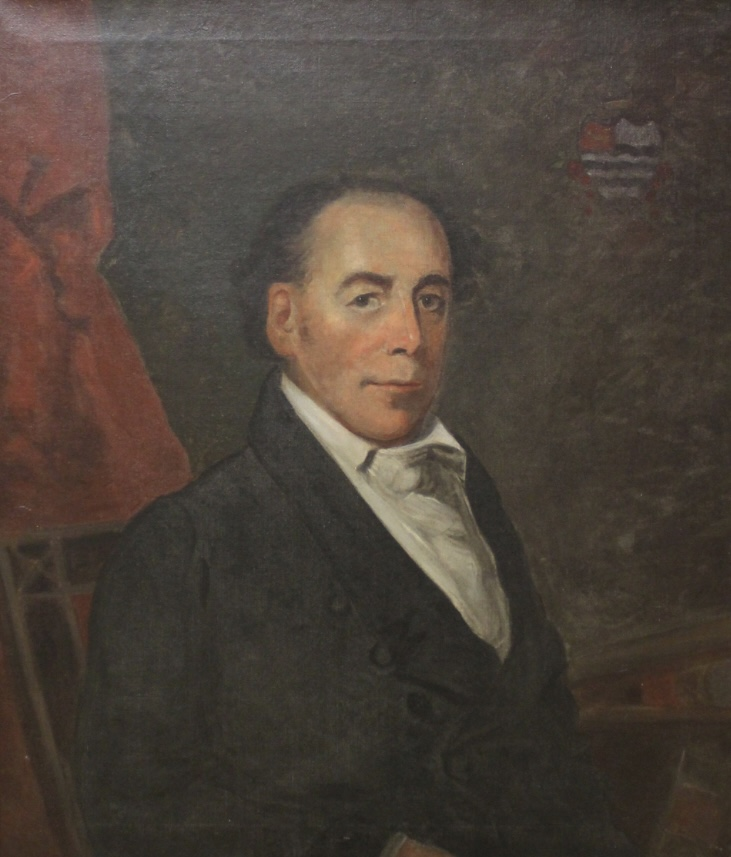

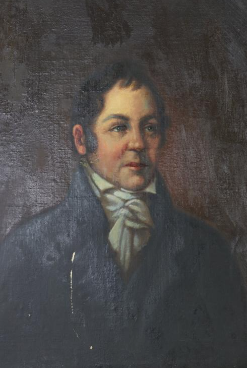
| Nominee | David Holmes | Cowles Mead |
| Party | Democratic-Republican | Democratic-Republican |
| Popular vote | 7,846 | 1,499 |
| Percentage | 83.96% | 16.04% |
- County results Holmes: 50–60% 60–70% 70–80% 80–90% >90% Mead: 50–60% 80–90% No Votes
Governor before election
Walter Leake
Democratic-Republican
Elected Governor
Gerard Brandon
Democratic-Republican

The 1825 Mississippi gubernatorial election was held on August 1, 1825, to elect the governor of Mississippi. David Holmes, a Democratic-Republican and first governor of Mississippi won against Cowles Mead, another Democratic Republican.

== Results ==
Mississippi gubernatorial election, 1825
| Party | Candidate | Votes | % |
|---|---|---|---|
| Democratic-Republican | David Holmes | 7,846 | 83.96% |
| Democratic-Republican | Cowles Mead | 1,499 | 16.04% |
| Total votes | | 9,345 | 100.00 |
| Democratic-Republican hold | | | |
