= List of United States representatives in the 21st Congress =

This is a complete list of United States representatives during the 21st United States Congress listed by seniority.

As an historical article, the districts and party affiliations listed reflect those during the 21st Congress (March 4, 1829 – March 3, 1831). Seats and party affiliations on similar lists for other congresses will be different for certain members.

Seniority depends on the date on which members were sworn into office. Since many members are sworn in on the same day, subsequent ranking is based on previous congressional service of the individual and then by alphabetical order by the last name of the representative.

Committee chairmanship in the House is often associated with seniority. However, party leadership is typically not associated with seniority.

Note: The "*" indicates that the representative/delegate may have served one or more non-consecutive terms while in the House of Representatives of the United States Congress.

== U.S. House seniority list ==
U.S. House seniority
Rank	Representative	Party	District	Seniority date (Previous service, if any)	No.# of term(s)	Notes
1	Thomas Newton, Jr.	AJ	VA-01	March 4, 1801	15th term	Dean of the House; Resigned on March 9, 1830.
2	William McCoy	AJ	VA-19	March 4, 1811	10th term	Dean of the House after Newton resigned.
3	John W. Taylor	AJ	NY-17	March 4, 1813	9th term	
4	Lewis Williams	AJ	NC-13	March 4, 1815	8th term	
5	Charles F. Mercer	AJ	VA-14	March 4, 1817	7th term	
6	Starling Tucker	J	SC-09	March 4, 1817	7th term	Left the House in 1831.
7	Mark Alexander	J	VA-04	March 4, 1819	6th term	
8	William S. Archer	J	VA-03	January 3, 1820	6th term	
9	Rollin Carolas Mallary	AJ	VT-02	January 13, 1820	6th term	
10	Noyes Barber	AJ	CT	March 4, 1821	5th term	
11	James Buchanan	J	PA-04	March 4, 1821	5th term	Left the House in 1831.
12	Henry William Connor	J	NC-11	March 4, 1821	5th term	
13	Henry W. Dwight	AJ	MA-09	March 4, 1821	5th term	Left the House in 1831.
14	Jacob C. Isacks	J	TN-04	March 4, 1821	5th term	
15	George McDuffie	N	SC-05	March 4, 1821	5th term	
16	John Reed, Jr.	AJ	MA-13	March 4, 1821; Previous service, 1813–1817.	7th term*	
17	Andrew Stevenson	J	VA-09	March 4, 1821	5th term	Speaker of the House
18	Samuel Swan	AJ	NJ	March 4, 1821	5th term	Left the House in 1831.
19	Wiley Thompson	J	GA	March 4, 1821	5th term	
20	Joseph Vance	J	OH-04	March 4, 1821	5th term	
21	Lewis Condict	AJ	NJ	October 9, 1821; Previous service, 1811–1817.	8th term*	
22	Churchill C. Cambreleng	J	NY-03	December 3, 1821	5th term	
23	Samuel D. Ingham	J	PA-08	October 7, 1822; Previous service, 1813–1818.	8th term*	Resigned in March 1829.
24	Jonathan Jennings	AJ	IN-02	December 2, 1822; Previous service, 1809–1816.	9th term*	Left the House in 1831.
25	Mordecai Bartley	AJ	OH-14	March 4, 1823	4th term	Left the House in 1831.
26	John S. Barbour	J	VA-15	March 4, 1823	4th term	
27	John Blair	J	TN-01	March 4, 1823	4th term	
28	Benjamin Williams Crowninshield	AJ	MA-02	March 4, 1823	4th term	Left the House in 1831.
29	Henry Hosford Gurley	AJ	LA-02	March 4, 1823	4th term	Left the House in 1831.
30	Robert P. Letcher	AJ	KY-04	March 4, 1823	4th term	
31	Henry C. Martindale	AJ	NY-18	March 4, 1823	4th term	Left the House in 1831.
32	Daniel H. Miller	J	PA-03	March 4, 1823	4th term	Left the House in 1831.
33	William Cabell Rives	J	VA-10	March 4, 1823	4th term	Resigned in 1829.
34	James Strong	AJ	NY-08	March 4, 1823; Previous service, 1819–1821.	5th term*	Left the House in 1831.
35	Henry R. Storrs	AJ	NY-14	March 4, 1823; Previous service, 1817–1821.	6th term*	Left the House in 1831.
36	Samuel Finley Vinton	AJ	OH-07	March 4, 1823	4th term	
37	Elisha Whittlesey	AJ	OH-13	March 4, 1823	4th term	
38	Charles A. Wickliffe	J	KY-09	March 4, 1823	4th term	
39	John Taliaferro	AJ	VA-13	March 24, 1824; Previous service, 1801–1803 and 1811–1813.	6th term**	Left the House in 1831.
40	George Wolf	J	PA-08	December 9, 1824	4th term	Resigned in 1829.
41	John Bailey	AJ	MA-10	December 13, 1824	4th term	Left the House in 1831.
42	Willis Alston	J	NC-02	March 4, 1825; Previous service, 1799–1815.	11th term*	Left the House in 1831.
43	John Anderson	J	ME-02	March 4, 1825	3rd term	
44	William Armstrong	AJ	VA-16	March 4, 1825	3rd term	
45	Tristam Burges	AJ	RI	March 4, 1825	3rd term	
46	Samuel Price Carson	J	NC-12	March 4, 1825	3rd term	
47	Nathaniel Claiborne	J	VA-07	March 4, 1825	3rd term	
48	Thomas Davenport	J	VA-06	March 4, 1825	3rd term	
49	John Davis	AJ	MA-05	March 4, 1825	3rd term	
50	Clement Dorsey	AJ	MD-01	March 4, 1825	3rd term	Left the House in 1831.
51	Edward Everett	AJ	MA-04	March 4, 1825	3rd term	
52	James Findlay	J	OH-01	March 4, 1825	3rd term	
53	Jonathan Harvey	J	NH	March 4, 1825	3rd term	Left the House in 1831.
54	Charles Eaton Haynes	J	GA	March 4, 1825	3rd term	Left the House in 1831.
55	Gabriel Holmes	J	NC-05	March 4, 1825	3rd term	Died on September 26, 1829.
56	Michael Hoffman	J	NY-15	March 4, 1825	3rd term	
57	Ralph Isaacs Ingersoll	AJ	CT	March 4, 1825	3rd term	
58	Joseph Lecompte	J	KY-06	March 4, 1825	3rd term	
59	Dutee Jerauld Pearce	J	RI	March 4, 1825	3rd term	
60	James K. Polk	J	TN-06	March 4, 1825	3rd term	
61	James Trezvant	J	VA-02	March 4, 1825	3rd term	Left the House in 1831.
62	John Varnum	AJ	MA-03	March 4, 1825	3rd term	Left the House in 1831.
63	Gulian C. Verplanck	J	NY-03	March 4, 1825	3rd term	
64	William Drayton	J	SC-01	May 17, 1825	3rd term	
65	James Clark	W	KY-03	August 1, 1825; Previous service, 1813–1816.	5th term*	Left the House in 1831.
66	James W. Ripley	J	ME-05	September 11, 1826	3rd term	Resigned on March 12, 1830.
67	Daniel Laurens Barringer	J	NC-08	December 4, 1826	3rd term	
68	Chauncey Forward	J	PA-13	December 4, 1826	3rd term	Left the House in 1831.
69	Robert Allen	J	VA-17	March 4, 1827	2nd term	
70	Philip P. Barbour	J	VA-11	March 4, 1827; Previous service, 1814–1825.	7th term*	Resigned on October 15, 1830.
71	Isaac C. Bates	AJ	MA-08	March 4, 1827	2nd term	
72	John Bell	J	TN-07	March 4, 1827	2nd term	
73	Samuel Butman	AJ	ME-07	March 4, 1827	2nd term	Left the House in 1831.
74	Richard Coulter	J	PA-17	March 4, 1827	2nd term	
75	Davy Crockett	AJ	TN-09	March 4, 1827	2nd term	Left the House in 1831.
76	Henry Daniel	J	KY-01	March 4, 1827	2nd term	
77	Warren R. Davis	N	SC-06	March 4, 1827	2nd term	
78	Robert Desha	J	TN-05	March 4, 1827	2nd term	Left the House in 1831.
79	John D. Dickinson	AJ	NY-09	March 4, 1827; Previous service, 1819–1823.	4th term*	Left the House in 1831.
80	Joseph Duncan	J	IL	March 4, 1827	2nd term	
81	Jonas Earll, Jr.	J	NY-23	March 4, 1827	2nd term	Left the House in 1831.
82	Joseph Fry, Jr.	J	PA-07	March 4, 1827	2nd term	Left the House in 1831.
83	Innis Green	J	PA-06	March 4, 1827	2nd term	Left the House in 1831.
84	Thomas H. Hall	J	NC-03	March 4, 1827; Previous service, 1817–1825.	6th term*	
85	James L. Hodges	AJ	MA-12	March 4, 1827	2nd term	
86	Jonathan Hunt	AJ	VT-01	March 4, 1827	2nd term	
87	Adam King	J	PA-10	March 4, 1827	2nd term	
88	Pryor Lea	J	TN-02	March 4, 1827	2nd term	Left the House in 1831.
89	Wilson Lumpkin	J	GA	March 4, 1827; Previous service, 1815–1817.	3rd term*	
90	Chittenden Lyon	J	KY-12	March 4, 1827	2nd term	
91	John Magee	J	NY-28	March 4, 1827	2nd term	Left the House in 1831.
92	William D. Martin	J	SC-04	March 4, 1827	2nd term	Left the House in 1831.
93	Lewis Maxwell	AJ	VA-21	March 4, 1827	2nd term	
94	William T. Nuckolls	J	SC-07	March 4, 1827	2nd term	
95	Isaac Pierson	AJ	NJ	March 4, 1827	2nd term	Left the House in 1831.
96	William Ramsey	J	PA-11	March 4, 1827	2nd term	
97	Joseph Richardson	AJ	MA-11	March 4, 1827	2nd term	Left the House in 1831.
98	John Roane	J	VA-12	March 4, 1827; Previous service, 1809–1815.	5th term*	Left the House in 1831.
99	William Russell	J	OH-05	March 4, 1827	2nd term	
100	Augustine Henry Shepperd	J	NC-09	March 4, 1827	2nd term	
101	Alexander Smyth	J	VA-22	March 4, 1827; Previous service, 1817–1825.	6th term*	Died on April 17, 1830.
102	Michael Sprigg	J	MD-04	March 4, 1827	2nd term	Left the House in 1831.
103	John Benton Sterigere	J	PA-05	March 4, 1827	2nd term	Left the House in 1831.
104	Joel Barlow Sutherland	J	PA-01	March 4, 1827	2nd term	
105	Benjamin Swift	AJ	VT-04	March 4, 1827	2nd term	Left the House in 1831.
106	George Corbin Washington	AJ	MD-03	March 4, 1827	2nd term	
107	Ephraim King Wilson	J	MD-08	March 4, 1827	2nd term	Left the House in 1831.
108	Joseph F. Wingate	AJ	ME-03	March 4, 1827	2nd term	Left the House in 1831.
109	Joel Yancey	J	KY-10	March 4, 1827	2nd term	Left the House in 1831.
110	Benjamin Gorham	AJ	MA-01	July 23, 1827; Previous service, 1820–1823.	4th term*	Left the House in 1831.
111	Rufus McIntire	J	ME-01	September 10, 1827	2nd term	
112	Kensey Johns, Jr.	AJ	DE	October 2, 1827	2nd term	Left the House in 1831.
113	William Stanbery	J	OH-08	October 9, 1827	2nd term	
114	Phineas L. Tracy	AM	NY-29	November 5, 1827	2nd term	
115	Richard Henry Wilde	J	GA	November 17, 1827; Previous service, 1815–1817 and 1825.	4th term**	
116	Thomas Chilton	J	KY-11	December 22, 1827	2nd term	Left the House in 1831.
117	Thomas Hinds	J	MS	October 21, 1828	2nd term	Left the House in 1831.
118	James F. Randolph	AJ	NJ	December 1, 1828	2nd term	
119	William G. Angel	J	NY-13	March 4, 1829; Previous service, 1825–1827.	2nd term*	
120	Benedict Arnold	AJ	NY-16	March 4, 1829	1st term	Left the House in 1831.
121	Robert Woodward Barnwell	J	SC-02	March 4, 1829	1st term	
122	Robert Emmett Bledsoe Baylor	J	AL-02	March 4, 1829	1st term	Left the House in 1831.
123	Thomas Beekman	AJ	NY-22	March 4, 1829	1st term	Left the House in 1831.
124	James Blair	J	SC-08	March 4, 1829; Previous service, 1821–1822.	2nd term*	
125	Abraham Bockee	J	NY-05	March 4, 1829	1st term	Left the House in 1831.
126	Ratliff Boon	J	IN-01	March 4, 1829; Previous service, 1825–1827.	2nd term*	
127	Peter I. Borst	J	NY-12	March 4, 1829	1st term	Left the House in 1831.
128	Thomas Bouldin	J	VA-05	March 4, 1829	1st term	
129	John Brodhead	J	NH	March 4, 1829	1st term	
130	Elias Brown	J	MD-05	March 4, 1829	1st term	Left the House in 1831.
131	William Cahoon	AM	VT-05	March 4, 1829	1st term	
132	John Campbell	J	SC-03	March 4, 1829	1st term	Left the House in 1831.
133	Timothy Childs	AM	NY-27	March 4, 1829	1st term	Left the House in 1831.
134	Thomas Chandler	J	NH	March 4, 1829	1st term	
135	Clement Comer Clay	J	AL-01	March 4, 1829	1st term	
136	Richard Coke, Jr.	J	VA-08	March 4, 1829	1st term	
137	Nicholas D. Coleman	J	KY-02	March 4, 1829	1st term	Left the House in 1831.
138	Richard M. Cooper	AJ	NJ	March 4, 1829	1st term	
139	Henry B. Cowles	AJ	NY-04	March 4, 1829	1st term	Left the House in 1831.
140	Hector Craig	J	NY-06	March 4, 1829; Previous service, 1823–1825.	2nd term*	Resigned on July 12, 1830.
141	Robert Craig	J	VA-20	March 4, 1829	1st term	
142	Joseph Halsey Crane	AJ	OH-03	March 4, 1829	1st term	
143	Thomas Hartley Crawford	J	PA-11	March 4, 1829	1st term	
144	William Creighton, Jr.	AJ	OH-06	March 4, 1829; Previous service, 1813–1817 and 1827–1828.	4th term**	
145	Jacob Crocheron	J	NY-02	March 4, 1829	1st term	Left the House in 1831.
146	Edmund Deberry	AJ	NC-07	March 4, 1829	1st term	Left the House in 1831.
147	Charles G. DeWitt	AJ	NY-07	March 4, 1829	1st term	Left the House in 1831.
148	Philip Doddridge	AJ	VA-18	March 4, 1829	1st term	
149	William W. Ellsworth	AJ	CT	March 4, 1829	1st term	
150	Joshua Evans, Jr.	J	PA-04	March 4, 1829	1st term	
151	Horace Everett	AJ	VT-03	March 4, 1829	1st term	
152	Isaac Finch	AJ	NY-19	March 4, 1829	1st term	Left the House in 1831.
153	George Fisher	AJ	NY-20	March 4, 1829	1st term	Resigned on February 5, 1830.
154	James Ford	J	PA-09	March 4, 1829	1st term	
155	Thomas Flournoy Foster	J	GA	March 4, 1829	1st term	
156	Nathan Gaither	J	KY-08	March 4, 1829	1st term	
157	John Gilmore	J	PA-16	March 4, 1829	1st term	
158	John M. Goodenow	J	OH-11	March 4, 1829	1st term	Resigned on April 9, 1830.
159	George Grennell, Jr.	AJ	MA-07	March 4, 1829	1st term	
160	Jehiel H. Halsey	J	NY-26	March 4, 1829	1st term	Left the House in 1831.
161	Joseph Hammons	J	NH	March 4, 1829	1st term	
162	Joseph Hawkins	AJ	NY-20	March 4, 1829	1st term	Left the House in 1831.
163	Joseph Hemphill	J	PA-02	March 4, 1829; Previous service, 1801-1803 and 1819–1826.	6th term**	Left the House in 1831.
164	Benjamin Chew Howard	J	MD-05	March 4, 1829	1st term	
165	Henry Hubbard	J	NH	March 4, 1829	1st term	
166	Thomas H. Hughes	J	NJ	March 4, 1829	1st term	
167	Jabez W. Huntington	AJ	CT	March 4, 1829	1st term	
168	Thomas Irwin	J	PA-14	March 4, 1829	1st term	Left the House in 1831.
169	William W. Irvin	J	OH-09	March 4, 1829	1st term	
170	Leonard Jarvis	J	ME-06	March 4, 1829	1st term	
171	Cave Johnson	J	TN-08	March 4, 1829	1st term	
172	Richard Mentor Johnson	J	KY-05	March 4, 1829; Previous service, 1807–1819.	7th term*	
173	Joseph G. Kendall	AJ	MA-06	March 4, 1829	1st term	
174	William Kennon, Sr.	J	OH-10	March 4, 1829	1st term	
175	John Kincaid	J	KY-07	March 4, 1829	1st term	Left the House in 1831.
176	Perkins King	J	NY-11	March 4, 1829	1st term	Left the House in 1831.
177	George Gray Leiper	J	PA-04	March 4, 1829	1st term	Left the House in 1831.
178	James Lent	J	NY-01	March 4, 1829	1st term	
179	Dixon H. Lewis	J	AL-03	March 4, 1829	1st term	
180	Alem Marr	J	PA-09	March 4, 1829	1st term	Left the House in 1831.
181	Thomas Maxwell	J	NY-25	March 4, 1829	1st term	Left the House in 1831.
182	William McCreery	J	PA-15	March 4, 1829	1st term	Left the House in 1831.
183	Robert Monell	J	NY-21	March 4, 1829; Previous service, 1819–1821.	2nd term*	Resigned on February 21, 1831.
184	Henry A. P. Muhlenberg	J	PA-07	March 4, 1829	1st term	
185	Ebenezer F. Norton	J	NY-30	March 4, 1829	1st term	Left the House in 1831.
186	Walter Hampden Overton	J	LA-03	March 4, 1829	1st term	Left the House in 1831.
187	Spencer Darwin Pettis	J	MO	March 4, 1829	1st term	
188	Robert Potter	J	NC-06	March 4, 1829	1st term	
189	Gershom Powers	J	NY-24	March 4, 1829	1st term	Left the House in 1831.
190	Abraham Rencher	J	NC-10	March 4, 1829	1st term	
191	Robert S. Rose	J	NY-26	March 4, 1829; Previous service, 1823–1827.	3rd term*	Left the House in 1831.
192	John Scott	J	PA-12	March 4, 1829	1st term	Left the House in 1831.
193	Benedict Joseph Semmes	AJ	MD-02	March 4, 1829	1st term	
194	William Biddle Shepard	AJ	NC-01	March 4, 1829	1st term	
195	James Shields	J	OH-02	March 4, 1829	1st term	Left the House in 1831.
196	Thomas Hale Sill	AJ	PA-18	March 4, 1829; Previous service, 1826–1827.	2nd term*	Left the House in 1831.
197	Jesse Speight	J	NC-04	March 4, 1829	1st term	
198	Ambrose Spencer	AJ	NY-10	March 4, 1829	1st term	Left the House in 1831.
199	Richard Spencer	J	MD-07	March 4, 1829	1st term	Left the House in 1831.
200	James Israel Standifer	J	TN-03	March 4, 1829; Previous service, 1823–1825.	2nd term*	
201	Philander Stephens	J	PA-09	March 4, 1829	1st term	
202	William L. Storrs	AJ	CT	March 4, 1829	1st term	
203	John Test	AJ	IN-03	March 4, 1829; Previous service, 1823–1827.	3rd term*	Left the House in 1831.
204	John Thomson	J	OH-12	March 4, 1829; Previous service, 1825–1827.	2nd term*	
205	James Moore Wayne	J	GA	March 4, 1829	1st term	
206	John W. Weeks	J	NH	March 4, 1829	1st term	
207	Campbell P. White	J	NY-03	March 4, 1829	1st term	
208	Edward Douglass White, Sr.	AJ	LA-01	March 4, 1829	1st term	
209	Ebenezer Young	AJ	CT	March 4, 1829	1st term	
	George Evans	AJ	ME-04	July 20, 1829	1st term	
	Peter Ihrie, Jr.	J	PA-08	October 13, 1829	1st term	
	Samuel A. Smith	J	PA-08	October 13, 1829	1st term	
	Edward Bishop Dudley	J	NC-05	November 10, 1829	1st term	Left the House in 1831.
	Henry Graybill Lamar	J	GA	December 7, 1829	1st term	
	George Edward Mitchell	J	MD-06	December 7, 1829; Previous service, 1823–1827.	3rd term*	
	Harmar Denny	AM	PA-16	December 15, 1829	1st term	
	William F. Gordon	J	VA-10	January 25, 1830	1st term	
	George Loyall	J	VA-01	March 9, 1830	1st term	Left the House in 1831.
	Samuel W. Eager	AJ	NY-06	November 2, 1830	1st term	Left the House in 1831.
	Jonah Sanford	J	NY-20	November 3, 1830	1st term	Left the House in 1831.
	John M. Patton	D	VA-11	November 25, 1830	1st term	
	Joseph Draper	J	VA-22	December 6, 1830	1st term	Left the House in 1831.
	Cornelius Holland	J	ME-05	December 6, 1830	1st term	
	Humphrey H. Leavitt	J	OH-11	December 6, 1830	1st term	

== Delegates ==
Rank	Delegate	Party	District	Seniority date (Previous service, if any)	No.# of term(s)	Notes
1	Joseph M. White	J	FL	March 4, 1825	3rd term	
2	Ambrose Hundley Sevier	J	AR	February 13, 1828	2nd term	
3	John Biddle	J	MI	March 4, 1829	1st term	

== See also ==
- 21st United States Congress
- List of United States congressional districts
- List of United States senators in the 21st Congress
