= Mississippi's Bainbridge County House of Representatives district =

Bainbridge County, Mississippi, existed from January 17, 1823, to January 21, 1824. The county was represented by William Reed in the 7th Mississippi Legislature.

Picture	Name	Party	Term	Session
	William Reed		January 17, 1823 – January 21, 1824	7th
