= 6th Mississippi Legislature =

1822 to 1823 legislative session

←	5th Mississippi Legislature	7th Mississippi Legislature	→

Overview
- Legislative body: Mississippi Legislature
- Jurisdiction: Mississippi, United States
- Term: December 23, 1822 – January 21, 1823

Mississippi State Senate
- President: David C. Dickson

Mississippi House of Representatives
- Speaker: Gerard C. Brandon

Sessions
- 1st: December 23, 1822 – January 21, 1823

The 6th Mississippi Legislature met in Jackson, Mississippi, between December 23, 1822, and January 21, 1823.

== Senate ==
As the lieutenant governor of Mississippi, David Dickson held the office of President of the Senate.

County District	Senator Name
Adams	Joseph Sessions
Adams	Charles M. Norton
Wilkinson	Abram M. Scott
Warren, Claiborne	Ralph Regan
Pike, Marion	William Spencer
Jackson, Hancock, Green, Perry	Laughlin McKay
Lawrence	Thomas Anderson
Jefferson, Hinds	Mr. Calvit
Wayne, Covington, Monroe	Bartlett C. Barry
Amite, Franklin	John R. Brown

== House ==
Gerard C. Brandon was elected Speaker of the House. Non-representatives Peter A. Vandorn and Dillard Collins were elected to the offices of Clerk and Door-Keeper respectively.

County	Representative Name
Adams	John Snodgrass
Adams	George Dougherty
Adams (Natchez)	Bela Metcalfe
Amite	Francis Graves
Amite	Richard Hurst
Amite	James Jones
Claiborne	Daniel Burnet
Claiborne	Adam Gordon
Covington	William Reed
Franklin	Joseph Robertson
Franklin	Jesse Guice
Green	John McLeod
Hinds	Benjamin F. Smith
Jackson	Walter Davis
Jefferson	Isaac N. Selser
Lawrence	Harmon Runnels
Lawrence	Arthur Fox
Lawrence	Joseph Cooper
Marion	Abram Ard
Monroe	Christopher H. Williams
Perry	David Reese
Pike	Richard Davison
Pike	David Cleveland
Pike	John Burton
Warren	James Gibson
Wayne	Samuel W. Dickson
Wayne	Mr. Lang
Wilkinson	Henry Cage
Wilkinson	Gerard C. Brandon
Wilkinson	Moses Liddell
