= 1821 Mississippi gubernatorial election =

- August 6, 1821
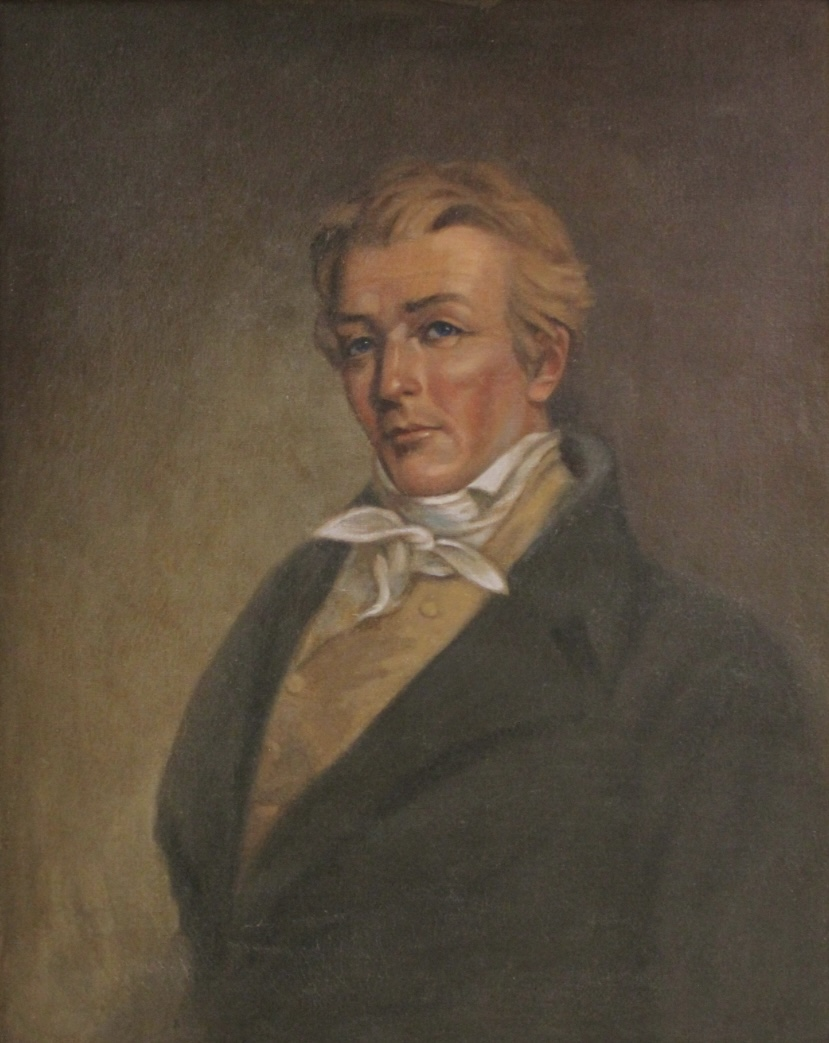

Nominee	Walter Leake	Charles B. Green
Party	Democratic-Republican	Democratic-Republican
Popular vote	4,780	1,419
Percentage	77.14%	22.86%
- County results Leake: 50–60% 60–70% 70–80% 80–90% >90% Green: 70–80% No votes
Governor before election
George Poindexter
Democratic-Republican
Elected Governor
Walter Leake
Democratic-Republican

The 1821 Mississippi gubernatorial election was held on August 6, 1821, to elect the governor of Mississippi. Walter Leake, a Democratic-Republican won against Charles B. Green, another Democratic Republican.

== Results ==
Mississippi gubernatorial election, 1821
Party	Candidate	Votes	%
Democratic-Republican	Walter Leake	4,780	77.14%
Democratic-Republican	Charles B. Green	1,419	22.86%
Total votes		6,199	100.00
Democratic-Republican hold			
