= 1819 Mississippi gubernatorial election =

- August 2, 1819
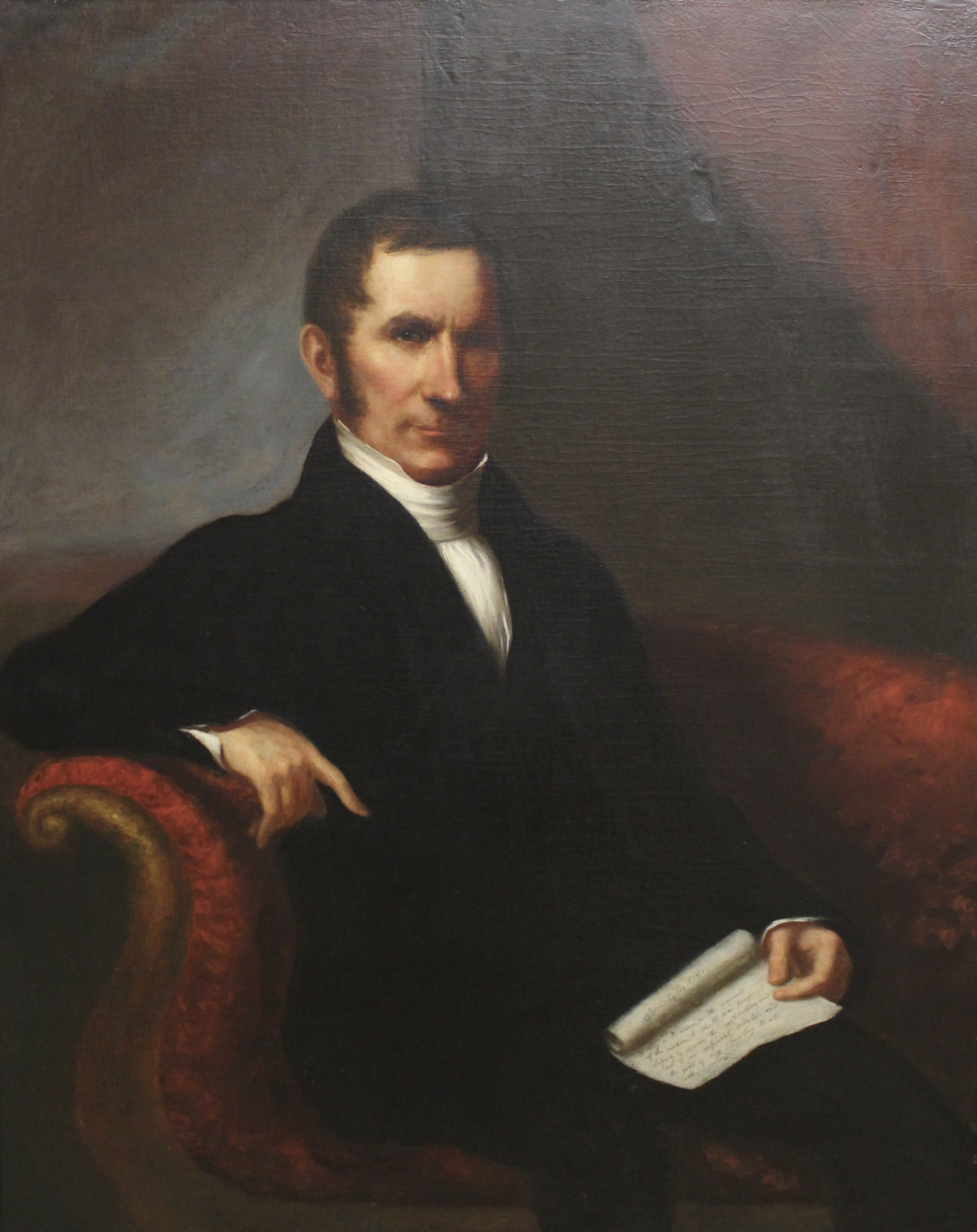

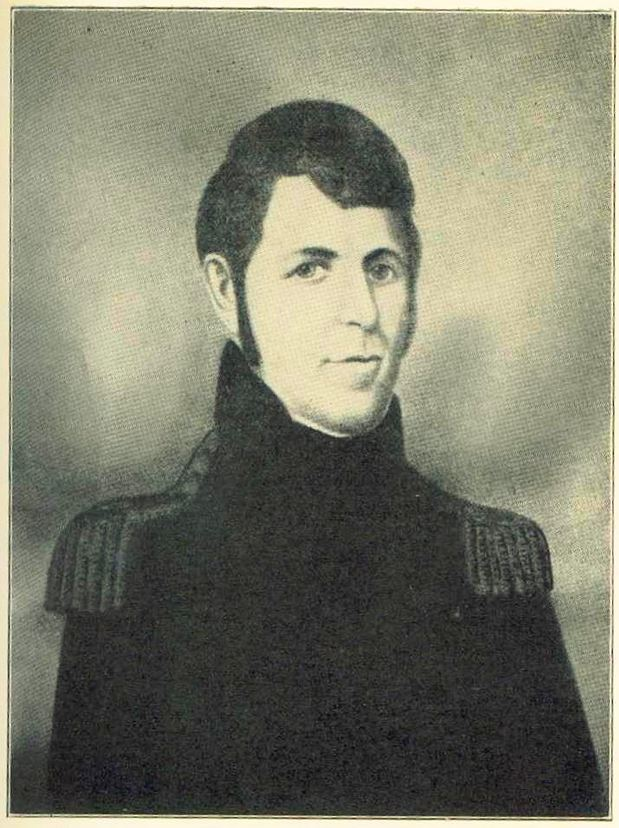
Nominee	George Poindexter	Thomas Hinds
Party	Democratic-Republican	Democratic-Republican
Popular vote	2,721	1,702
Percentage	61.52%	38.48%
- County results Poindexter: 50–60% 60–70% 70–80% 80–90% >90% Hinds: 60–70% 70–80% 80–90% >90% Unorganized territory
Governor before election
David Holmes
Democratic-Republican
Elected Governor
Walter Leake
Democratic-Republican

The 1819 Mississippi gubernatorial election was held on August 2, 1819, to elect the governor of Mississippi. George Poindexter, a Democratic-Republican won against Thomas Hinds, another Democratic Republican.

== Results ==
Mississippi gubernatorial election, 1819
Party	Candidate	Votes	%
Democratic-Republican	George Poindexter	2,721	61.52%
Democratic-Republican	Thomas Hinds	1,702	38.48%
Total votes		4,423	100.00
Democratic-Republican hold			
