= Cowles Mead =

American politician (1776–1844)

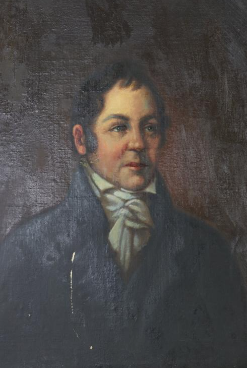

Delegate-elect to the U.S. House of Representatives from the Mississippi Territory's at-large district
- In office Not seated
- Preceded by: William Lattimore
- Succeeded by: George Poindexter (Representative)

Secretary of State of Mississippi
- In office 1806–1807
- Governor: Robert Williams
- Preceded by: Thomas Hill Williams
- Succeeded by: Thomas Hill Williams

Member of the U.S. House of Representatives from Georgia's at-large district
- In office March 4, 1805 – December 24, 1805
- Preceded by: Samuel Hammond
- Succeeded by: Thomas Spalding

Personal details
- Born: October 18, 1776 Bedford County, Virginia, U.S.
- Died: May 17, 1844 (aged 67) Hinds County, Mississippi, U.S.
- Party: Democratic-Republican

Cowles Mead (October 18, 1776 – May 17, 1844) was a United States representative from Georgia. Born in Virginia, he received an English education and became a private practice lawyer.

He presented credentials as a member-elect to the 9th United States Congress (March 4, 1805 – December 24, 1805) but was replaced by Thomas Spalding who contested the initial election outcome. Mead then served as Secretary of the Mississippi Territory, 1806–1807; Acting Governor of Mississippi Territory, 1806–1807; and member of the Mississippi House of Representatives, 1807 and 1822–23.

He was unsuccessful candidate for election to the 13th United States Congress in 1812. He was a delegate to the first constitutional convention for setting up the new State of Mississippi in 1817. He was an unsuccessful candidate for election to the 16th United States Congress in 1818. He served in the Mississippi Senate in 1821. He was later the Speaker of the Mississippi House of Representatives, the lower chamber of the Mississippi state legislature, from 1823 to 1827. He was also an unsuccessful candidate for election as governor of Mississippi in 1825. He died 19 years later in 1844 on his Greenwood Plantation in Hinds County, Mississippi where he was buried.

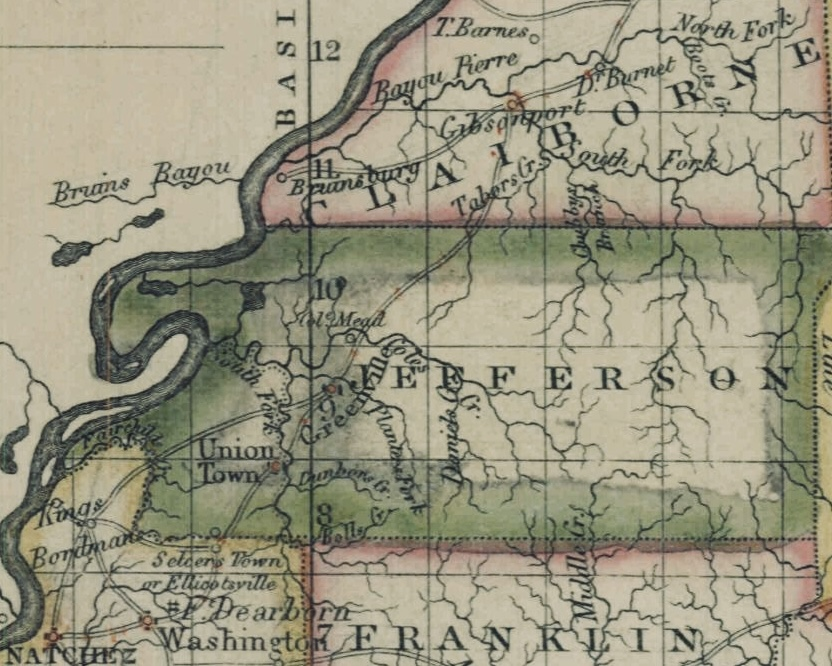
Location of "Col. Mead" plantation on the 1819 John Melish map of Mississippi

An article published in 1849 described his involvement in the arrest of Aaron Burr and the writer's impression of Mead's character:

Connected with the early history of Jefferson county was the important and memorable arrest of Aaron Burr, for high treason, which happened while Gen. Mead was the acting Governor of the Territory of Mississippi, and gave much eclat to the brief administration of that worthy functionary, who, in after life, never failed, on all proper occasions, to refer with complacency to the time when he was Governor of Mississippi, and the valuable services rendered by him to the General Government, in arresting one, who, at that day, was looked upon as a disorganist, if not a traitor. Time may have changed the popular sentiment, touching the guilt of the highly gifted, ambitious, but disappointed aspirant for the highest honors of the nation. Gen. Mead, or rather Gov. Mead, (for he preferred the more pompous civil title,) merited great praise for the energy displayed on the occasion of Burr's arrest. It was one of those epochs in the life of man that stamps his destiny, and, if judiciously managed, will open the way to popular favor; but which too often deprives the fortunate individual of the little popularity he had already acquired. This was the case with Mead, whose head appeared to be completely turned by this little affair, which ever after was a theme upon which his memory appeared to dwell with unmingled pleasure. Mead was vain, pompous and superficial, and seldom looked beyond the narrow circle of which he was the self-constituted centre, unless it were to draw within his influence, those upon whom his high-sounding titles made a deeper impression, than this vapid grandiloquence.

Mead's house, called Meadvilla, stood along the main (only) street of Washington, Mississippi Territory. After his time it was used as the Washington Hotel and later purchased and occupied for many years by Benjamin L. C. Wailes.

U.S. House of Representatives
Preceded by Samuel Hammond	Member of the U.S. House of Representatives from the Georgia's at-large congressional district 1805	Succeeded by Thomas Spalding
Preceded by William Lattimore	Delegate-elect to the U.S. House of Representatives from the Mississippi Territory's at-large congressional district 1817	Succeeded by George Poindexter as U.S. Representative
Political offices
Preceded by Thomas Hill Williams	Secretary of State of Mississippi; 1806–1807	Succeeded by Thomas Hill Williams
Party political offices
Preceded by Walter Leake	Democratic-Republican nominee for Governor of Mississippi; 1825	Party dissolved
