= Powhatan Ellis =

American judge

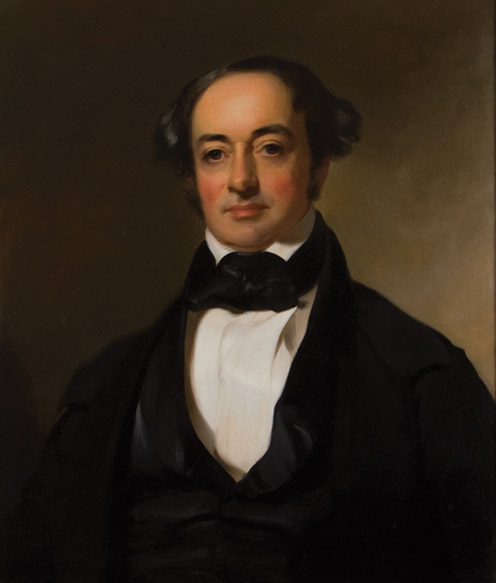

Judge of the United States District Court for the District of Mississippi
- In office July 14, 1832 – January 5, 1836
- Appointed by: Andrew Jackson
- Preceded by: Peter Randolph
- Succeeded by: George Adams

United States Senator from Mississippi
- In office March 4, 1827 – July 16, 1832
- Preceded by: Thomas Buck Reed
- Succeeded by: John Black
- In office September 28, 1825 – January 28, 1826
- Appointed by: Walter Leake
- Preceded by: David Holmes
- Succeeded by: Thomas Buck Reed

Personal details
- Born: Powhatan Ellis; January 17, 1790 Amherst County, Virginia, U.S.
- Died: March 18, 1863 (aged 73) Richmond, Virginia, U.S.
- Resting place: Shockoe Hill Cemetery; Richmond, Virginia
- Party: Jacksonian
- Education: Washington and Lee University; Dickinson College (BA); College of William & Mary

Powhatan Ellis (January 17, 1790 – March 18, 1863) was a justice of the Mississippi Supreme Court, United States senator from Mississippi, and a United States district judge of the United States District Court for the District of Mississippi.

== Education and career ==
Born on January 17, 1790, at Red Hill Farm in Amherst County, Virginia, Ellis graduated from Washington Academy (now Washington and Lee University) in 1809, received an Artium Baccalaureus degree in 1810 from Dickinson College and graduated from the College of William & Mary in 1814, where he studied law. He was admitted to the bar and entered private practice in Lynchburg, Virginia from 1813 to 1814 and from 1815 to 1816. He was a lieutenant in the Prevost Guards of Virginia in 1814. He resumed private practice in Natchez, Mississippi Territory in 1816. He continued private practice in Winchester, Mississippi Territory (State of Mississippi from December 10, 1817) from 1816 to 1817. He was a justice of the Mississippi Supreme Court from 1817 to 1818 and from 1818 to 1825.

== Congressional service ==
Ellis was appointed as a Jacksonian Democrat to the United States Senate from Mississippi to fill the vacancy caused by the resignation of United States Senator David Holmes and served from September 28, 1825, to January 28, 1826, when a successor was elected and qualified. He was an unsuccessful candidate for election to fill the vacancy. He was elected as a Jacksonian Democrat to the United States Senate and served from March 4, 1827, to July 16, 1832, resigning to accept a judicial position.

== Federal judicial service ==
Ellis was nominated by President Andrew Jackson on July 13, 1832, to a seat on the United States District Court for the District of Mississippi vacated by Judge Peter Randolph. He was confirmed by the United States Senate on July 14, 1832, and received his commission the same day. His service terminated on January 5, 1836, when he resigned.

== Later career and death ==
Ellis was appointed charge d'affaires to Mexico for the United States Department of State by President Jackson, serving from January 1836 to December 1836 when he closed the legation. He was appointed Envoy Extraordinary and Minister Plenipotentiary to Mexico for the United States Department of State by President Martin Van Buren, serving from February 1839 to April 1842. He resumed private practice in Natchez starting in 1842 and continued private practice in Richmond, Virginia until 1863. He died on March 18, 1863, in Richmond. He was interred in Shockoe Hill Cemetery in Richmond.

== Heritage and family ==
One account in The Green Bag stated that Ellis was a descendant of Pocahontas. In 1833, he married Eliza Rebecca Winn who died in the spring of 1835. Together, they had two children.

== Legacy ==
The city of Ellisville, Mississippi is named in Ellis's memory.

== See also ==
- List of justices of the Supreme Court of Mississippi

U.S. Senate
Preceded by David Holmes	U.S. senator (Class 1) from Mississippi; 1825–1826; Served alongside: Thomas Hill Williams	Succeeded by Thomas Buck Reed
Preceded by Thomas Buck Reed	U.S. senator (Class 1) from Mississippi; 1827–1832; Served alongside: Thomas Hill Williams, Thomas Buck Reed, Robert H. Adams, George Poindexter	Succeeded by John Black
Legal offices
Preceded by Peter Randolph	Judge of the United States District Court for the District of Mississippi; 1832–1836	Succeeded by George Adams
Preceded by Newly established court	Justice of the Supreme Court of Mississippi; 1818–1825	Succeeded by Isaac Caldwell
