= William Lattimore =

American politician

Delegate to the U.S. House of Representatives from the Mississippi Territory's at-large district
- In office March 4, 1813 – March 3, 1817
- Preceded by: George Poindexter
- Succeeded by: Cowles Mead (Elect)
- In office March 4, 1803 – March 3, 1807
- Preceded by: Thomas M. Green Jr.
- Succeeded by: George Poindexter

Personal details
- Born: February 9, 1774 Norfolk, Virginia, British America
- Died: April 3, 1843 (aged 69) Natchez, Mississippi, U.S.
- Party: Democratic-Republican

William Lattimore (February 9, 1774 – April 3, 1843) was Delegate to the United States House of Representatives from Mississippi Territory.

== Biography ==
=== Early life ===
William Lattimore was born in Norfolk, Virginia on February 9, 1774. He attended the common schools, where he studied medicine.

=== Career ===
He moved to Natchez, Mississippi Territory, and practiced his profession. When the Mississippi Territory was formed in 1798, he took an active part in the organization of the government.

He was elected as a Delegate to the 8th and 9th Congresses that lasted from March 4, 1803 to March 3, 1807. He was also elected to the 13th and 14th Congresses (March 4, 1813 – March 3, 1817) as well.

He was a delegate to the first State constitutional convention of Mississippi in 1817, appointed a censor of the medical profession under the constitution and code, and one of the commissioners to select the site for the seat of the new State government.

He was a candidate in the 1823 Mississippi gubernatorial election, losing to Walter Leake.

=== Death ===
He died in Natchez, Mississippi on April 3, 1843.

== See also ==
- 8th United States Congress
- 9th United States Congress
- 13th United States Congress
- 14th United States Congress
- Mississippi Territory
- United States House of Representatives

U.S. House of Representatives
Preceded by Thomas M. Green Jr.	Delegate to the U.S. House of Representatives from the Mississippi Territory's at-large congressional district 1803–1807	Succeeded by George Poindexter
Preceded by George Poindexter	Delegate to the U.S. House of Representatives from the Mississippi Territory's at-large congressional district 1813–1817	Succeeded by Cowles Mead; Elect
