= Mississippi Territory's at-large congressional district =

Coordinates: 32.855152°N 89.566329°W

- Obsolete district
- Created: 1801, as a non-voting delegate was granted by Congress
- Eliminated: 1817, as a result of statehood
- Years active: 1801–1817

The area of Mississippi Territory was increased in 1804 and again in 1812.

On December 10, 1817, Mississippi was admitted into the Union as a state and Alabama Territory to the east was spun off.

== List of delegates representing the district ==
On April 7, 1798, the Mississippi Territory was created. A non-voting delegate was elected at-large beginning March 4, 1801.

Delegate (Territorial home)	Party	Years	Cong ress	Electoral history
Narsworthy Hunter (Natchez)	Democratic-Republican	December 7, 1801 – March 11, 1802	7th	Elected in 1801. Died.
Vacant			7th	March 11, 1802 – December 6, 1802
Thomas M. Green Jr. (Fayette)	Democratic-Republican	December 6, 1802 – March 3, 1803	7th	Elected to finish Hunter's term. Retired.
William Lattimore (Natchez)	Democratic-Republican	March 4, 1803 – March 3, 1807	8th 9th	Elected in 1803. Re-elected in 1805. Retired.
George Poindexter (Woodville)	Democratic-Republican	March 4, 1807 – March 3, 1813	10th 11th 12th	Elected in 1806. Re-elected in 1808. Re-elected in 1811. Retired.
William Lattimore (Liberty)	Democratic-Republican	March 4, 1813 – March 3, 1817	13th 14th	Elected in 1813. Re-elected in 1815. Retired.
Vacant		March 4, 1817 – December 10, 1817	15th	Cowles Mead was elected in 1817 but not seated. The district became inactive as Mississippi achieved statehood.
