= 1817 Mississippi gubernatorial election =

- September 1, 1817
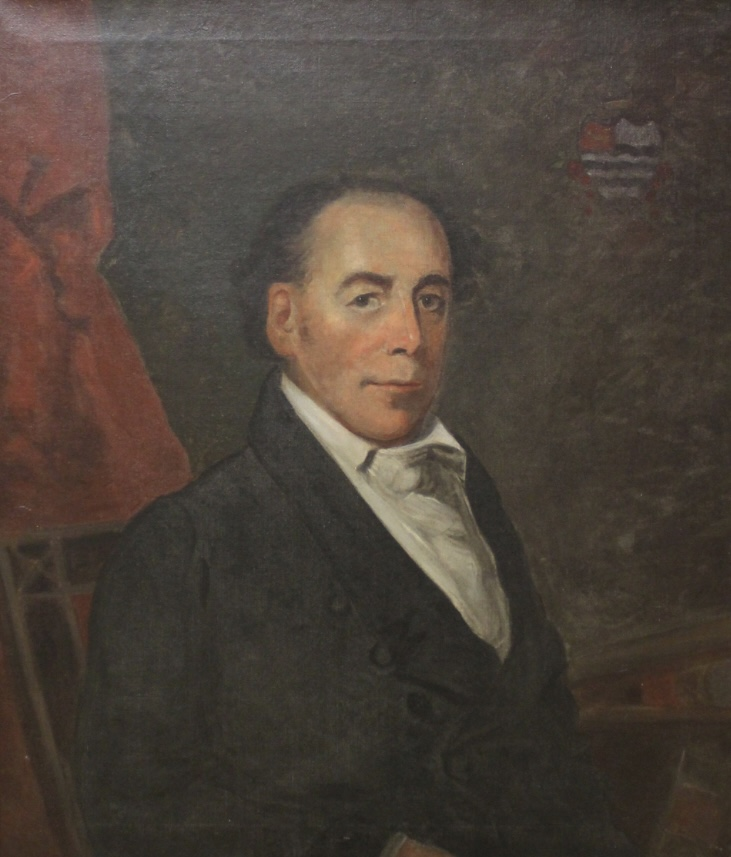
Nominee	David Holmes
Party	Democratic-Republican
Popular vote	4,108
Percentage	100.00%
- County results Holmes: 100%
Governor before election
David Holmes
Democratic-Republican
Elected Governor
David Holmes
Democratic-Republican

The 1817 Mississippi gubernatorial election was held on September 1, 1817, to elect the first Governor of the newly admitted state of Mississippi. Incumbent territorial governor David Holmes ran unopposed, garnering 100% of the vote.

== Results ==
Mississippi gubernatorial election, 1817
Party	Candidate	Votes	%
Democratic-Republican	David Holmes (incumbent)	4,108	100.00
Total votes		4,108	100.00
