= William Haile (Mississippi politician) =

American politician

Member of the U.S. House of Representatives from Mississippi's at-large district
- In office July 10, 1826 – September 12, 1828
- Preceded by: Christopher Rankin
- Succeeded by: Thomas Hinds

Member of the Mississippi House of Representatives
- In office 1826

Personal details
- Born: 1797
- Died: March 7, 1837 (aged 39–40) near Woodville, Mississippi, U.S.
- Party: Jacksonian

William Haile (1797 – March 7, 1837) was an American politician who served parts of two terms as a U.S. representative from Mississippi from 1826 to 1828.

== Biography ==
Born in 1797, Haile moved to Mississippi and settled in Woodville, Wilkinson County.

=== State house ===
He served as member of the Mississippi House of Representatives in 1826.

=== Congress ===
Haile was elected as a Jacksonian to the Nineteenth Congress to fill the vacancy caused by the death of Christopher Rankin. He was reelected as a Jacksonian to the Twentieth Congress and served from July 10, 1826, to September 12, 1828, when he resigned.

He was an unsuccessful candidate for reelection in 1828 to the Twenty-first Congress.

=== Later career and death ===
He served as delegate to the State constitutional convention in 1832. He died near Woodville, Mississippi, March 7, 1837.

U.S. House of Representatives
Preceded by Christopher Rankin	Member of the U.S. House of Representatives from Mississippi's at-large congressional district July 10, 1826 – September 12, 1828	Succeeded by Thomas Hinds
