= Thomas Hinds =

American soldier and politician (1780–1840)

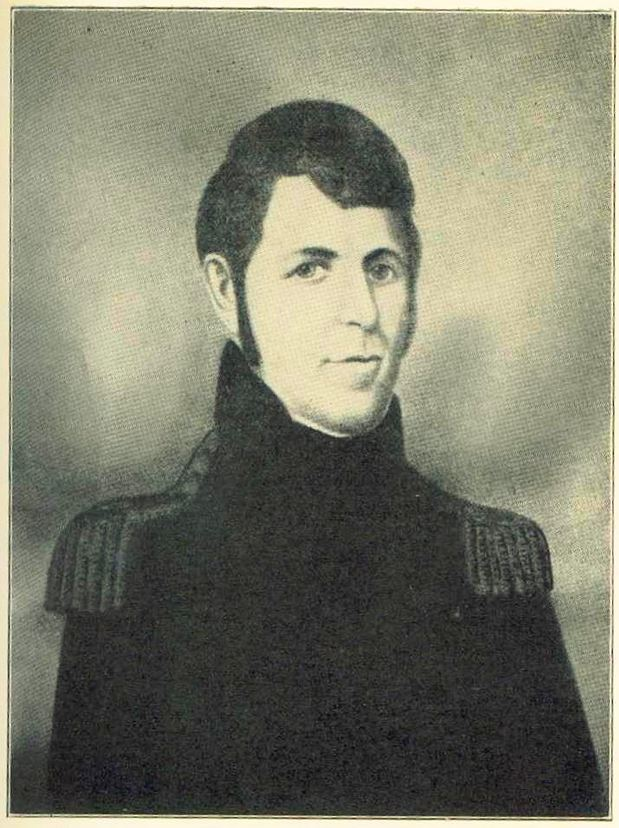

Member of the U.S. House of Representatives from Mississippi's at-large district
- In office September 12, 1828 – March 3, 1831
- Preceded by: William Haile
- Succeeded by: Franklin E. Plummer

Personal details
- Born: January 9, 1780 Berkeley County, Virginia, U.S.
- Died: August 23, 1840 (aged 60) Jefferson County, Mississippi, U.S.
- Resting place: Hinds Cemetery; Jefferson County, Mississippi, U.S.
- Party: Democratic-Republican
- Spouse: Lemenda Green

Military service
- Branch/service: Mississippi Militia
- Years of service: 1805–1819
- Rank: Major general
- Battles/wars: War of 1812; Battle of Pensacola; Battle of New Orleans; Creek War

Thomas Hinds (January 9, 1780 – August 23, 1840) was an American soldier, and politician from the state of Mississippi, who served in the United States Congress from 1828 to 1831. A hero of the War of 1812, Hinds is best known today as the namesake of Hinds County, Mississippi.

== Biography ==
=== Early years ===
Thomas Hinds was born in Berkeley County, Virginia, (now part of West Virginia), on January 9, 1780. He would later move to (Old) Greenville in Jefferson County, Mississippi, where he was appointed justice and assessor of the county in 1805.

Hinds was made a member of the Mississippi Territorial Council in 1806, remaining in that position until 1808.

=== Military career ===
Hinds was commissioned as a cavalry lieutenant in October 1805, gaining promotion to major in September 1813, during the War of 1812. His forces participated with distinction in the Battle of Pensacola (1814) and the Battle of New Orleans (1814–1815), under the command of General Andrew Jackson.

Late in 1815, following the death of General Ferdinand Claiborne, Hinds was promoted by President James Madison as Brigadier General of the Mississippi territorial militia. He was continued as the highest officer of the Mississippi militia in the rank of Major general following statehood (late 1817), resigning this position in December 1819.

=== Promotion and retirement ===
Late in 1815, following the death of General Ferdinand Claiborne, Hinds was promoted by President James Madison as Brigadier General of the Mississippi territorial militia. He was continued as the highest officer of the Mississippi militia in the rank of Major general following statehood (late 1817), resigning this position in December 1819.

=== Later life ===
In the August 1819 general election, Hinds ran for Governor of Mississippi against George Poindexter but was soundly defeated, garnering only 38% of the vote behind Poindexter's 62%. (Mrs. Hinds had died in late June of the same year, at age 28.)

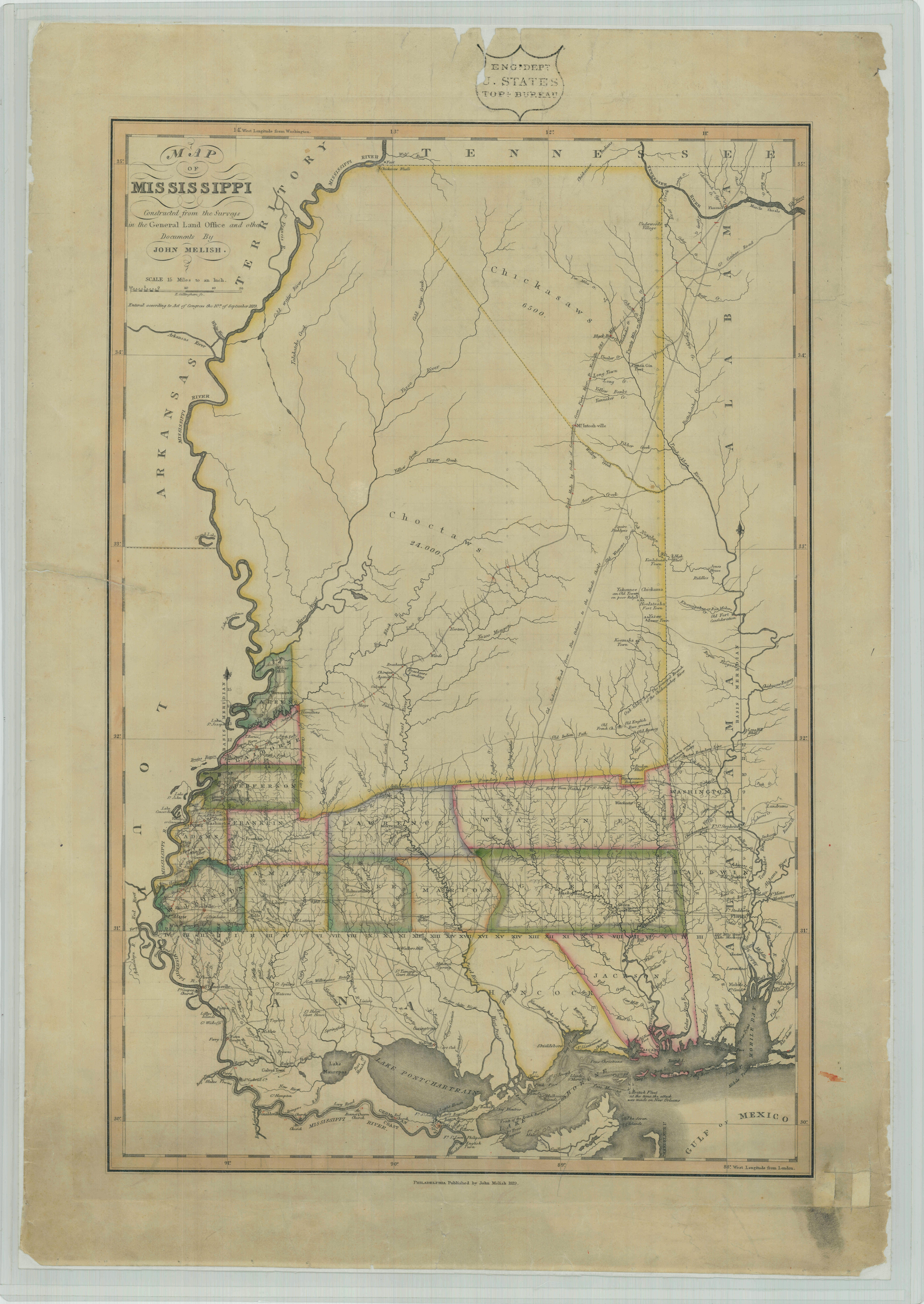
Melish map of Mississippi used at the treaty grounds at Doak's Stand on the Natchez Trace

In 1820 Hinds served as Indian agent of the United States with Andrew Jackson for the negotiations with the Choctaw of what became the Treaty of Doak's Stand.

Hinds was elected to the Mississippi Legislature in 1823.

Following the resignation of William Haile on September 12, 1828, he was elected to the 20th Congress to complete his term. He later won re-election and held that position until March 3, 1831.

Thomas was married to Lemenda Green, daughter of Congressman Thomas M. Green.

=== Death and legacy ===
Hinds died on August 23, 1840, in Jefferson County, Mississippi. He was sixty years old at the time of his death. As of 1899 his remains were buried in a cotton field near Fayette, Mississippi, on what had been his plantation Home Hill Place, along with the bodies of his wife and brother John Hinds.

During his lifetime Hinds was regarded as the leading military hero of Mississippi. He was remembered by Congressman J.F.H. Claiborne as having been "beloved by his troops, and one of the most intrepid men that ever lived."

Hinds County, Mississippi, home of the state capital, was named in his honor.

== Bibliography ==
- Brannan, John, ed. (1823). Official letters of the military and naval officers of the United States : during the war with Great Britain in the years 1812, 13, 14, & 15. Washington, D.C.: Way & Gideon. OCLC 1083481275.
- Davis, William C. (2019). The Greatest Fury: The Battle of New Orleans and the Rebirth of America. Dutton Caliber, an imprint of Penguin Random House. ISBN 978-0-39-958522-7.
- Hannings, Bud (2012). The War of 1812: A Complete Chronology with Biographies of 63 General Officers. Jefferson, NC: McFarland & Co. ISBN 978-0-78-646385-5.
- James, William (1818), A full and correct account of the military occurrences of the late war between Great Britain and the United States of America; with an appendix, and plates. Volume II, London: Printed for the author and distributed by Black et al., ISBN 0-665-35743-5, OCLC 2226903
- Latour, Arsène Lacarrière (1816), Historical Memoir of the War in West Florida and Louisiana in 1814–15, with an Atlas, Gainesville: University Press of Florida, ISBN 0-8130-1675-4, OCLC 40119875
- Rowland, Dunbar, ed. (1907). Mississippi: Comprising Sketches of Counties, Towns, Events, Institutions and Persons - Volume 1. Atlanta, GA: Southern Historical Publishing Association. OCLC 794220955.
- Walker, Alexander Page (1856). An Authentic Narrative of the Memorable Achievements of the American Army. New York: J. C. Derby.

U.S. House of Representatives
Preceded by William Haile	Member of the U.S. House of Representatives from Mississippi's at-large congressional district October 21, 1828 – March 3, 1831	Succeeded by Franklin E. Plummer
