= Franklin E. Plummer =

American politician (c. 1795–1852)

Member of the U.S. House of Representatives from Mississippi's at-large district
- In office March 4, 1831 – March 3, 1835
- Preceded by: Thomas Hinds
- Succeeded by: John Francis Hamtramck Claiborne

Personal details
- Born: c. 1795 Massachusetts, U.S.
- Died: September 21, 1852 (aged c. 57) Jackson, Mississippi, U.S.
- Party: Jacksonian
- Profession: Politician, lawyer

Franklin E. Plummer (c. 1795 – September 21, 1852) was a U.S. representative from Mississippi.

Born in Massachusetts, Plummer moved to Mississippi and taught school in Copiah County. After completing his law studies he was admitted to the bar and commenced practice in Westville. He held various local offices and served as a member of the State house of representatives, as well as founding the town of Pittsburg (now part of Grenada).

Plummer was elected as a Jacksonian to the Twenty-second and Twenty-third Congresses (March 4, 1831 – March 3, 1835). He was an unsuccessful candidate for the United States Senate. He died in Jackson, Mississippi, on September 21, 1852.

U.S. House of Representatives
Preceded by Thomas Hinds	Member of the U.S. House of Representatives from Mississippi's at-large congressional district March 4, 1831 – March 3, 1835	Succeeded by John F. H. Claiborne
