= Laughlin McKay =

American state legislator

Laughlin McKay was a state legislator in Mississippi. He served in the Mississippi Senate in 1823 and 1825. He was Scottish. He succeeded Isaac R. Nicholson.

== See also ==
- 6th Mississippi Legislature
- 7th Mississippi Legislature
