= Thomas Hill Williams =

United States Senator from Mississippi (1773–1850)

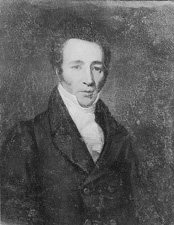

United States Senator from Mississippi
- In office December 10, 1817 – March 3, 1829
- Preceded by: Position Established
- Succeeded by: Thomas B. Reed

Personal details
- Born: January 14, 1773 Surry County, North Carolina
- Died: December 7, 1850 (aged 77) Robertson County, Tennessee, U.S.
- Party: Democratic-Republican, Jacksonian

Thomas Hill Williams (January 14, 1773 – December 7, 1850) was a United States Senator from Mississippi, one of the first two senators from that state. He served two terms of office, from 1817 to 1829, retiring to Tennessee after his retirement from politics.

== Biography ==
Thomas Hill Williams was born in North Carolina, growing up just east of the Pee Dee River in rural Anson County. He appears to have inherited some wealth at an early age, appearing on county tax rolls in 1795 as the owner of 681 acres of land. It is believed that he entered politics at an early age and was elected clerk of the Tennessee House of Representatives in 1796 and 1797.

Williams completed preparatory studies, studied law, was admitted to the bar, and became a lawyer. In 1803 he made his way to the Territory of Mississippi, soon becoming the private secretary to Territorial Governor William C. C. Claiborne.

Williams was appointed register of the United States General Land Office for the Territory of Mississippi in 1805 by Secretary of State James Madison. He was recognized as a popular and qualified appointee and named Acting Governor of the Mississippi Territory on July 1, 1805 in a recess appointment by President Thomas Jefferson.

Williams was reappointed secretary in 1807, and was again Acting Governor in 1809. In 1810 he was collector of customs at New Orleans, and was a delegate to the state constitutional convention.

Upon the admission of Mississippi as a state into the Union in 1817, Williams was elected as a Democratic-Republican to the U.S. Senate, one of the first two senators from Mississippi. He was reelected as a Jackson Republican (later Jacksonian) in 1823, leaving the body with the expiration of his second term on March 3, 1829.

While a member the Senate Williams was a member of the Naval Affairs committee in five of his six Congresses and of the Public Lands committee in three of them. He was chairman of the Committee on Public Lands (Sixteenth Congress). He was a supporter of the Missouri Compromise during the session of 1820-21.

Williams moved to Tennessee after he left the Senate, declining a chance at reelection or any form of public office. He died of dropsy in Robertson County on December 7, 1850.

U.S. Senate
Preceded by None	U.S. senator (Class 2) from Mississippi; 1817–1829; Served alongside: Walter Leake, David Holmes, Powhatan Ellis, Thomas B. Reed, Powhatan Ellis	Succeeded by Thomas B. Reed
