= Robert H. Adams =

American politician

Robert Huntington Adams

United States Senator from Mississippi
- In office January 6, 1830 – July 2, 1830
- Preceded by: Thomas B. Reed
- Succeeded by: George Poindexter

Member of the Mississippi House of Representatives
- In office 1828

Personal details
- Born: 1792 Rockbridge County, Virginia, US
- Died: July 2, 1830 (aged 37–38) Natchez, Mississippi, US
- Party: Jacksonian Democrat

Robert Huntington Adams (1792 – July 2, 1830) was an American lawyer and politician from the state of Mississippi. He was briefly a member of the United States Senate, suddenly dying six months after his election to that body.

== Biography ==
=== Early years ===
Robert Huntington Adams was born in Rockbridge County, Virginia in 1792; as was common in the 18th century, the day and month went unrecorded. He learned the trade of barrelmaking there and worked several years at that task.

By 1806, Adams had attained sufficient learning to graduate from Washington College (now Washington and Lee University) at Lexington, Virginia. He subsequently studied law, was admitted to the bar, and started a legal practice in Knoxville, Tennessee. Then following a brief residence in Nashville, he relocated to Natchez, Mississippi where he rose to prominence as an attorney and politician.

Adams was reckoned by U.S. Senator Henry S. Foote to be an able orator despite an inferior formal education, able to expound upon a great variety of subjects in such a compelling manner that his listeners felt themselves in the presence of "one of nature's most wonderful productions."

=== Political career ===
Adams was elected to the Mississippi House of Representatives in 1828, representing a district including the city of Natchez there.

In the 19th century, state legislatures elected U.S. Senators, sometimes creating unusual paths for advancement. This was particularly true in the case of Robert Adams, who barely one year after being elected a state representative was surprisingly tapped to fill the seat vacated the recently deceased Thomas B. Reed, narrowly winning election to the open seat by vote of the legislature in a four-man field.

Adams, a Jacksonian, advanced to the office and was sworn in on January 6, 1830. He served in Washington, D.C. throughout the winter and spring, returning to Mississippi for summer recess in May of that year.

=== Death and legacy ===
Not long after his return to Natchez, Adams was stricken ill and died suddenly on July 2, 1830, at the age of just 38. His body was interred in Natchez City Cemetery.

Adams was remembered by Henry Foote as a talented and able public speaker for whom "there is no knowing what amount of fame he might have acquired, or what wonders he would have achieved upon the theatre of national affairs" had he not suffered a premature death.

== See also ==
- List of members of the United States Congress who died in office (1790–1899)

== Footnotes ==
U.S. Senate
Preceded by Thomas B. Reed	U.S. senator (Class 2) from Mississippi; 1830; Served alongside: Powhatan Ellis	Succeeded by George Poindexter
