= David C. Dickson (Mississippi politician) =

American politician

Member of the U.S. House of Representatives from Mississippi's at-large district
- In office March 4, 1835 – July 31, 1836
- Preceded by: Harry Cage
- Succeeded by: Samuel J. Gholson

3rd Lieutenant Governor of Mississippi
- In office January 7, 1822 – January 7, 1824
- Governor: Walter Leake

3rd Secretary of State of Mississippi
- In office January 1833 – January 1835
- Governor: Abram M. Scott; Charles Lynch
- Preceded by: John A. Grimball
- Succeeded by: Barry W. Benson

Personal details
- Born: March 22, 1792 Georgia, U.S.
- Died: July 31, 1836 (aged 44) Hot Springs, Arkansas, U.S.
- Party: Anti-Jacksonian

David C. Dickson Jr. (March 22, 1792 - July 31, 1836) was a Mississippi state legislator, secretary of state, lieutenant governor and a U.S. representative for the at-large district.

== Early life and career ==
David C. Dickson Jr. was born on March 22, 1792, in Georgia. He was the son of David Dickson Sr. and his second wife, Martha (Cureton) Dickson. Dickson moved to Mississippi. He studied medicine and worked as a physician in Pike County. According to a 1918 account of notable men in Mississippi history, "He was a physician of high standing, a fine talker, a raconteur of rare gifts and immensely popular. He held numerous posts of honor and filled them all creditably."

== Political career ==
In 1817, he served as a delegate to the Georgia Constitutional Convention in 1817. He was a Brigadier general of the state militia in 1818. He served in the Mississippi Senate in 1820 and 1821. He was the third Lieutenant Governor of Mississippi from January 7, 1822, to January 7, 1824, serving under Governor Walter Leake. He was Postmaster of Jackson, Mississippi in 1822. He was an unsuccessful candidate for Governor of Mississippi in the 1823 election. He served as delegate to the state constitutional convention in 1832 and was an unsuccessful candidate for president of the convention. He was Secretary of the Mississippi State Senate in 1833 and Mississippi Secretary of State from January 1833 to January 1835.

Dickson was elected as an Anti-Jacksonian to the Twenty-fourth Congress (March 4, 1835 – July 31, 1836). He died on July 31, 1836, in Hot Springs, Arkansas.

== See also ==
- List of members of the United States Congress who died in office (1790–1899)

Political offices
Preceded by James Patton	Lieutenant Governor of Mississippi; 1822–1824	Succeeded by Gerard Brandon
U.S. House of Representatives
Preceded by Harry Cage	Member of the U.S. House of Representatives from Mississippi's at-large congressional district March 4, 1835 – July 31, 1836	Succeeded by Samuel J. Gholson
