= Christopher Rankin =

American politician (1788–1826)

Member of the U.S. House of Representatives from Mississippi's at-large district
- In office March 4, 1819 – March 14, 1826
- Preceded by: George Poindexter
- Succeeded by: William Haile

Chairman of the United States House Committee on Natural Resources
- In office 1821–1826
- Preceded by: Richard Clough Anderson, Jr.
- Succeeded by: John Scott

Personal details
- Born: 1788 Washington County, Pennsylvania, U.S.
- Died: March 14, 1826 (aged 37–38) Washington D.C., U.S.
- Resting place: Congressional Cemetery
- Party: Democratic-Republican
- Other political affiliations: Jacksonian

Christopher Rankin (1788 – March 14, 1826) was an attorney and politician from Pennsylvania, who moved to the Mississippi Territory in 1809. He was a delegate to the state constitutional convention in 1817, and was later elected as a U.S. representative for several terms, serving from 1819 to 1826.

== Early life and education ==
Born in Washington County, Pennsylvania, Rankin attended preparatory studies at Jefferson College (now Washington & Jefferson College) in Canonsburg, Pennsylvania and graduated in 1808. He moved to Georgia, where he taught a village school and studied law at the same time. After being admitted to the bar in 1809, he began practice in Liberty, Mississippi.

== Political career ==
Rankin was elected to a term as a member of the territorial legislature in 1812, serving one year. He moved to Natchez, Mississippi, in 1816 and practiced law. He was elected as a delegate to the state constitutional convention in 1817. That year he ran as an unsuccessful candidate for United States Senator in 1817 (the position at that time was elected by the state legislature). After that, he held several local offices.

Rankin was elected as a Democratic-Republican to the Sixteenth and Seventeenth Congresses, reelected as a Jackson Republican to the Eighteenth Congress, and elected as a Jacksonian to the Nineteenth Congress, serving from March 4, 1819, until his death in Washington, D.C., March 14, 1826. He served as chairman of the Committee on Public Lands (Seventeenth through Nineteenth Congresses). He was interred in the Congressional Cemetery.

== See also ==
- List of members of the United States Congress who died in office (1790–1899)

U.S. House of Representatives
| Preceded by George Poindexter | Member of the U.S. House of Representatives from Mississippi's at-large congressional district March 4, 1819 – March 14, 1826 | Succeeded by William Haile |
