= David Holmes (politician) =

American politician (1769–1832)

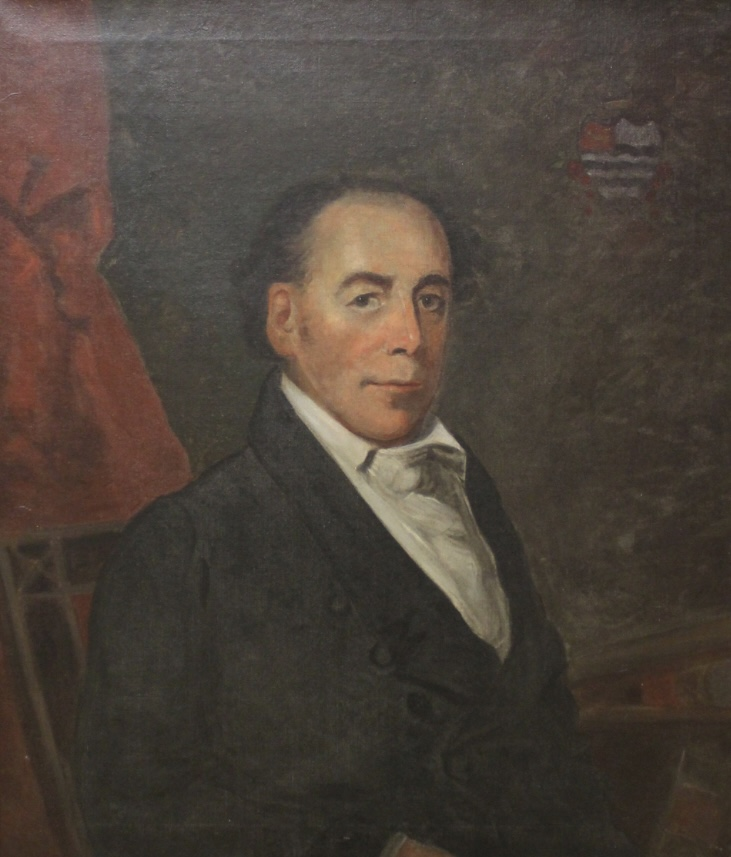

5th Governor of Mississippi
- In office January 7, 1826 – July 25, 1826
- Lieutenant: Gerard Brandon
- Preceded by: Gerard Brandon
- Succeeded by: Gerard Brandon

United States Senator from Mississippi
- In office August 30, 1820 – September 25, 1825
- Preceded by: Walter Leake
- Succeeded by: Powhatan Ellis

1st Governor of Mississippi
- In office December 10, 1817 – January 5, 1820
- Lieutenant: Duncan Stewart
- Preceded by: Himself (as Governor of the Mississippi Territory)
- Succeeded by: George Poindexter

4th Governor of Mississippi Territory
- In office March 7, 1809 – December 10, 1817
- Appointed by: Thomas Jefferson
- Preceded by: Robert Williams
- Succeeded by: Himself (as Governor of the State of Mississippi)

Member of the U.S. House of Representatives from Virginia's 4th district
- In office March 4, 1803 – March 3, 1809
- Preceded by: Abram Trigg
- Succeeded by: Jacob Swoope

Member of the U.S. House of Representatives from Virginia's 2nd district
- In office March 4, 1797 – March 3, 1803
- Preceded by: Andrew Moore
- Succeeded by: James Stephenson

Personal details
- Born: March 10, 1769 Hanover, Province of Pennsylvania, British America
- Died: August 20, 1832 (aged 63) Jordan Springs, Virginia, U.S.
- Party: Democratic
- Other political affiliations: Democratic-Republican
- Education: College of William & Mary

Coat of arms of David Holmes

David Holmes (March 10, 1769 – August 20, 1832) was an American politician in Virginia and Mississippi. He served five terms as a U.S. congressman from Virginia's 2nd congressional district and later was important in Mississippi's development as a state. The federal government appointed him as the fourth and last governor of the Mississippi Territory. In 1817, he was unanimously elected as the first governor of the state of Mississippi. He served a term as U.S. senator from Mississippi, appointed to fill a vacancy until elected by the legislature. Elected again as governor, he was forced to resign early due to ill health. He returned to Virginia in his last years.

== Career ==
Born near Hanover in York County, Province of Pennsylvania, Holmes, as a child, moved with his family to Frederick County, Virginia. He attended Winchester Academy, ultimately studying law and passing the bar. He started his practice in Harrisonburg, Virginia. By adulthood, he considered himself a Virginian. He served as U.S. Representative from Virginia's 2nd congressional district, serving a total of five terms from 1797 until 1809, as he was repeatedly re-elected.

=== Electoral history ===
- 1797; Holmes was elected to the U.S. House of Representatives from Virginia's 2nd congressional district, with 60.4% of the vote, defeating Democratic-Republican John Bowyer and Federalist John Steele.
- 1799; Holmes was re-elected with 83.56% of the vote, defeating Federalist Robert Porterfield.
- 1801; Holmes was re-elected over Federalist Alexander Sinclair.
- 1803; Holmes was re-elected with 70.39% of the vote, defeating Federalist Isaac Van Meter.
- 1805; Holmes was re-elected unopposed.
- 1807; Holmes was re-elected unopposed.

== Mississippi Territory ==
President Thomas Jefferson appointed Holmes as the fourth governor of the Mississippi Territory. Holmes was very popular, and his appointment marked the end of a long period of political factionalism within the territory. European Americans were pressing to gain more land and encroaching on Native American territory of the Chickasaw and Choctaw people.

Holmes was the last governor of the Mississippi Territory, serving from 1809 to 1817. He was generally successful in dealing with a variety of matters, including expansion, land policy, Indians, the War of 1812, and the constitutional convention of 1817 (of which he was elected president).

Often concerned with problems regarding West Florida, he had a significant role in 1810 in negotiations that led to the peaceful occupation by the United States of part of that territory. McCain (1967) concludes that Holmes's success was not based on brilliance but upon kindness, unselfishness, persuasiveness, courage, honesty, diplomacy, and intelligence.

== Mississippi statehood ==
In 1817, Mississippi joined the United States as the 20th state. Holmes was elected unanimously as the first governor of the State of Mississippi. He took the oath of office in October 1817. However, Mississippi did not officially become a state until December. He established the state judicial system and the state militia during his term. He also organized the land east of the Pearl River, which the Choctaw people had ceded to the United States under considerable pressure.

In 1820, he was appointed as a Democratic-Republican to fill the US Senate vacancy from Mississippi caused by the resignation of Walter Leake. He was elected the same year by the state legislature (as was the practice then) as a Jackson Republican in August 1820, serving from 1821 until late 1825, when he ran in the gubernatorial campaign and was elected to another term as governor. He resigned as senator. Due to his declining health, he was able to serve only six months as Mississippi's fifth governor. If both territory and statehood years are counted, he is Mississippi's longest-serving governor, at over 11 years of service (10 years, 9 months, 29 days the first tenure; and 6 months, 18 days the second tenure).

Holmes returned to near Winchester, Virginia, where his health failed. He died in 1832 at Jordan White Sulphur Springs resort. He was buried in the Mt. Hebron Cemetery in Winchester. He was predeceased by his brother, Major Andrew Hunter Holmes, a casualty of the Battle of Mackinac Island during the War of 1812.

== Legacy ==
Holmes County, Mississippi, is named in honor of him.

Holmes Avenue in Huntsville, Alabama was part of the Mississippi Territory when built and is named in honor of him.

Political offices
Preceded by Robert Williams	Governor of Mississippi Territory; 1809–1817	Succeeded by Himself as Governor of Mississippi
Preceded by Himself as Governor of Mississippi Territory	Governor of Mississippi; 1817–1820	Succeeded by George Poindexter
Preceded by Gerard Brandon	Governor of Mississippi; 1826	Succeeded by Gerard Brandon
U.S. Senate
Preceded by Walter Leake	U.S. senator (Class 1) from Mississippi; 1820–1825; Served alongside: Thomas H. Williams	Succeeded by Powhatan Ellis
U.S. House of Representatives
Preceded by Abram Trigg	Member of the U.S. House of Representatives from Virginia's 4th congressional district 1803–1809	Succeeded by Jacob Swoope
Preceded by Andrew Moore	Member of the U.S. House of Representatives from Virginia's 2nd congressional district 1797–1803	Succeeded by James Stephenson
