= Walter Leake =

American politician (1762–1825)

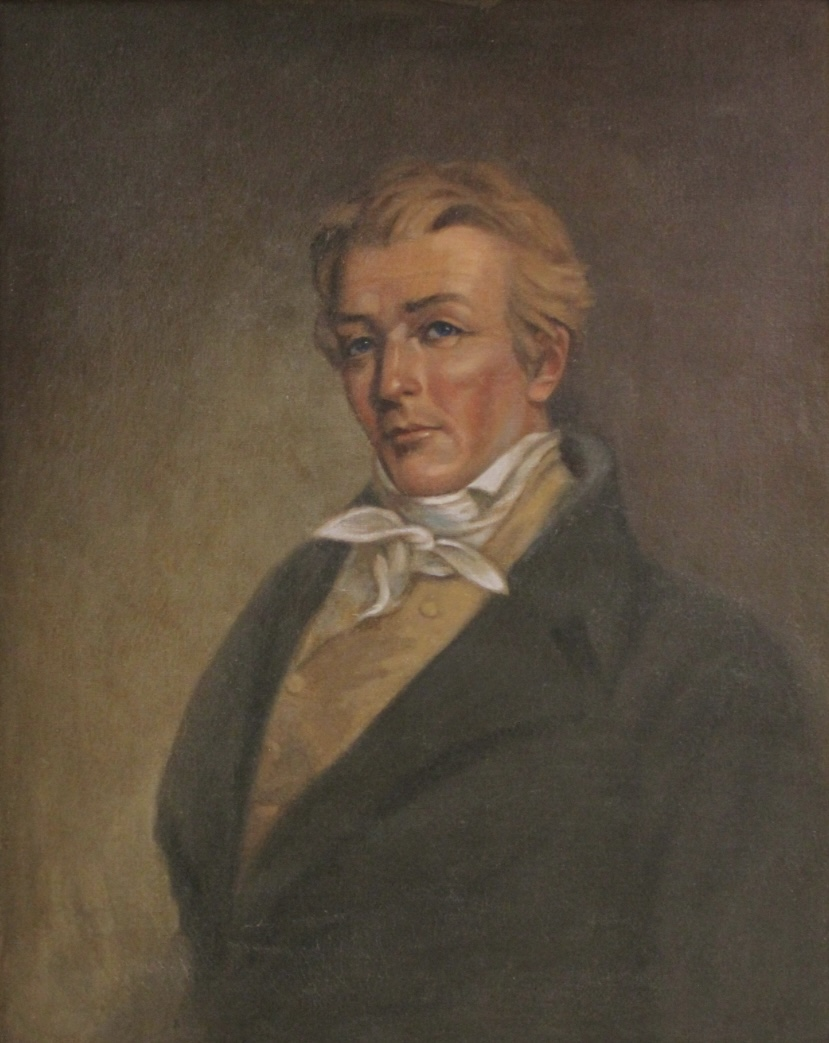

3rd Governor of Mississippi
- In office January 7, 1822 – November 17, 1825
- Lieutenant: David Dickson; Gerard Brandon
- Preceded by: George Poindexter
- Succeeded by: Gerard Brandon

United States Senator from Mississippi
- In office December 10, 1817 – May 15, 1820
- Preceded by: Position established
- Succeeded by: David Holmes

Member of the Virginia House of Delegates from Albemarle County, Virginia
- In office December 7, 1806 – December 1, 1805 Serving with Hugh Nelson
- Preceded by: Joel Yancey
- Succeeded by: Peter Carr
- In office December 7, 1804 – December 1, 1805 Serving with William Waller Hening
- Preceded by: Peter Carr
- Succeeded by: Joel Yancey

Personal details
- Born: May 20, 1762 Albemarle County, Colony of Virginia, British America
- Died: November 17, 1825 (aged 63) Clinton, Mississippi, U.S.
- Party: Democratic-Republican

Walter Daniel Leake (May 20, 1762 – November 17, 1825) was an American lawyer, planter and politician. After serving in the American Revolutionary War and in the Virginia House of Delegates, he moved to the Mississippi Territory where he became a judge, and after statehood a United States Senator from Mississippi (1817–1820), as a circuit court judge in 1821, and as third Governor of Mississippi (1822–1825). He was the first Governor of Mississippi to die in office. A relative, Walter D. Leake, served in the Virginia House of Delegates for many terms beginning in 1842 and also represented Goochland County in the Virginia Secession Convention long after this man's death.

== Early life ==
Walter Leake was born on May 20, 1762, in Albemarle County in the Colony of Virginia to the former Patience Morris and her husband Capt. Mark Leake. His uncle Rev. Samuel Leake, was a Princeton University graduate, a member of the first Board of Trustees of Hampden–Sydney College, and an ancestor of Senator John McCain of Arizona. Walter Leake was descended from John Leake.

== Virginia career ==
A private, Leake served in the American Revolutionary War in a North Carolina regiment, including in the Battle of Yorktown according to Marquis de Lafayette. He served briefly in 1784 as a corporal under Major Lewis. In 1804 and 1806 Albemarle County voters elected him to separated terms in the Virginia House of Delegates where he first replaced Jefferson kinsman Peter Carr and then was replaced by Carr, serving first alongside Willliam Waller Hening and then alongside Hugh Nelson. In between he was replaced by Jacksonian Democrat Joel Yancey (who would later become a Congressman).

== Mississippi judge and legislator ==
Leake was appointed a judge in the Territory of Mississippi in 1807, and he settled in Claiborne County. He would serve as a delegate to Mississippi's Constitutional Convention of 1817 for this county. Leake also served as a United States Senator for the State of Mississippi from 1817 to 1820. While in the Senate, Leake served as Chairman of the Committee on Indian Affairs. In 1820, Leake was appointed United States Marshall for the District of Mississippi, and then was appointed to fill a vacancy on the Mississippi Supreme Court in 1821, and went on to serve as the governor of Mississippi from 1822 to 1825.

== Governor of Mississippi ==
On August 6, 1821, Walter Leake was elected the 3rd Governor of Mississippi. He faced attorney and state legislator Charles B Green in the general election. During his first administration, Leake signed a law to eliminate debtor's prisons in Mississippi and attempted to promote a law to abolish dueling. Leake oversaw the expansion of Mississippi's road system, extending roads from the state's new capitol, Jackson, to other settlements in Mississippi. In the 1823 gubernatorial election, Leake was reelected, defeating former Congressional Delegate William Lattimore and Lieutenant Governor David Dickson. Leake died in Mount Salus, Mississippi (now named Clinton) on November 17, 1825, while serving as Governor of Mississippi.

== Personal life ==
Leake married Elizabeth Wingfield. Their daughter, Susan Wingfield Leake, married Henry Goodloe Johnston of Spotsylvania County, Virginia, in 1807 and was an ancestor of Haley Barbour.

== Legacy ==
Leake County, Mississippi, as well as Leakesville, Mississippi, are named for him.

== See also ==
- List of Mississippi Territory judges
- List of justices of the Supreme Court of Mississippi

U.S. Senate
Preceded by Position established	U.S. senator (Class 1) from Mississippi; 1817–1820; Served alongside: Thomas H. Williams	Succeeded by David Holmes
Political offices
Preceded by George Poindexter	Governor of Mississippi; 1822–1825	Succeeded by Gerard Brandon
Preceded by John Taylor	Justice of the Supreme Court of Mississippi; 1821–1822	Succeeded by Louis L. Winston
