= George Poindexter =

American politician (1779–1853)

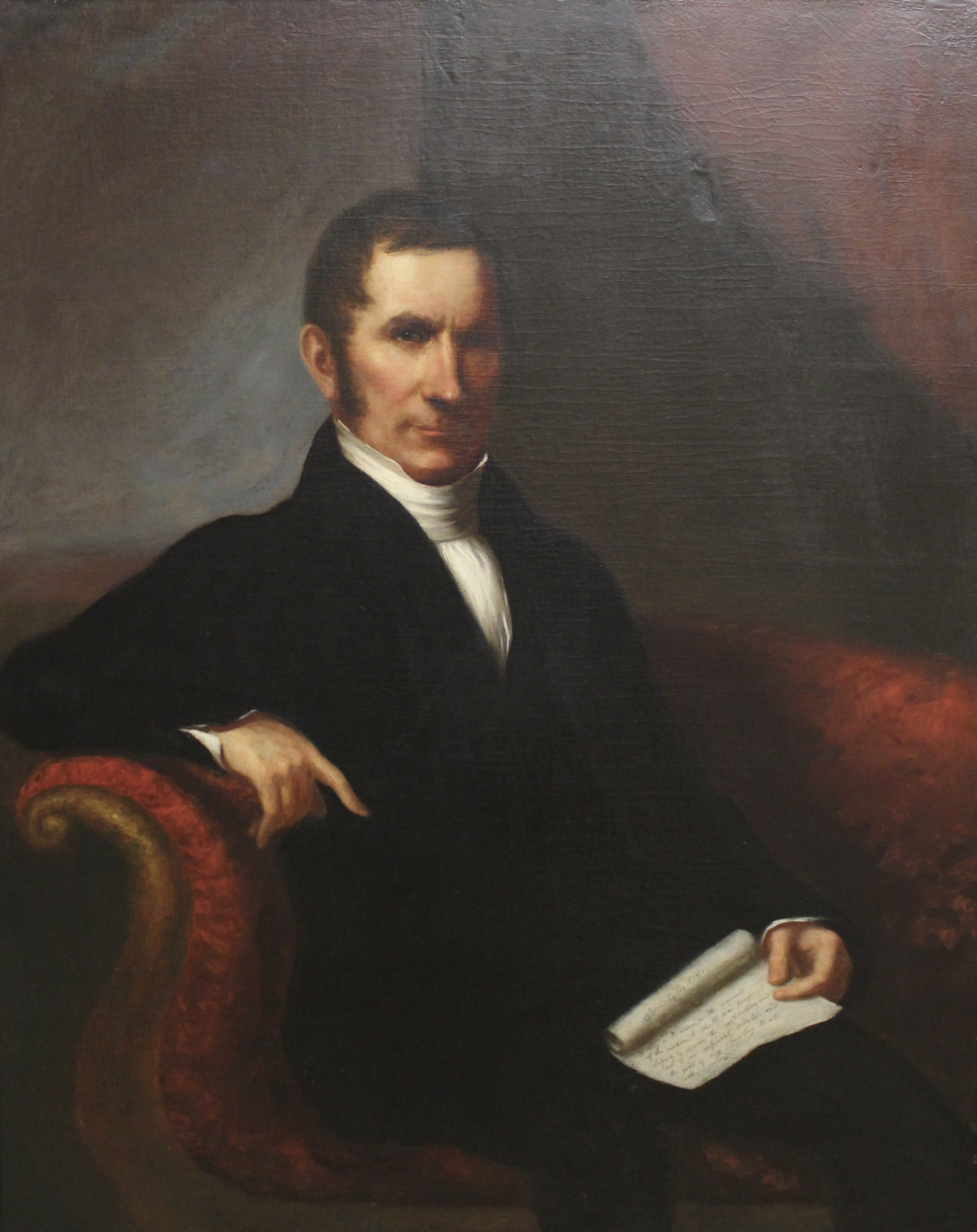

President pro tempore of the United States Senate
- In office June 28, 1834 – November 30, 1834
- Preceded by: Hugh Lawson White
- Succeeded by: John Tyler

United States Senator from Mississippi
- In office October 15, 1830 – March 3, 1835
- Preceded by: Robert H. Adams
- Succeeded by: Robert J. Walker

2nd Governor of Mississippi
- In office January 5, 1820 – January 7, 1822
- Preceded by: David Holmes
- Succeeded by: Walter Leake

Member of the U.S. House of Representatives from Mississippi's at-large district
- In office December 10, 1817 – March 3, 1819
- Preceded by: Cowles Mead (Delegate-elect)
- Succeeded by: Christopher Rankin

Delegate to the U.S. House of Representatives from Mississippi Territory's at-large district
- In office March 4, 1807 – March 3, 1813
- Preceded by: William Lattimore
- Succeeded by: William Lattimore

Personal details
- Born: 1779 Louisa County, Virginia, U.S.
- Died: September 5, 1853 (aged 74) Jackson, Mississippi, U.S.
- Party: Democratic-Republican (Before 1825); Jacksonian (1825–1832); National Republican (1832–1834); Democratic (1834–1853)
- Spouse(s): Lydia Carter; Agatha Chinn; Ann Hewes

George Poindexter (1779 – September 5, 1853) was an American politician, lawyer, and judge from Mississippi. Born in Virginia, he moved to the Mississippi Territory in 1802. He served as United States Representative from the newly admitted state, was elected as Governor (1820–1822), and served as a United States senator.

== Early life ==
Poindexter was born in Louisa County, Virginia in 1779. He was the son of Thomas Poindexter and Lucy (Jones) Poindexter; the Poindexters were a large Virginia family of French Huguenot and English ancestry. Poindexter received a sporadic education, primarily from studying under the tutelage of two of his brothers. He was orphaned after his father died when Poindexter was 17; Poindexter inherited two enslaved people and a share of his father's land, residing with an older brother until he came of age. The Poindexter family of Virginia frequently used the names George, Thomas, and John; as a result, their genealogy is difficult to trace. He may have been the uncle of Ohio abolitionist preacher James Preston Poindexter, whose father was Joseph Poindexter, a journalist at the Richmond Enquirer.

The exact details of Poindexter's legal studies are not known, but according to family tradition, Poindexter studied under practicing attorneys, first in Kentucky, and later in Richmond. He was admitted to the bar in 1800 and began to practice in Milton, an Albemarle County town along the Rivanna River which no longer exists.

== Move to Mississippi ==
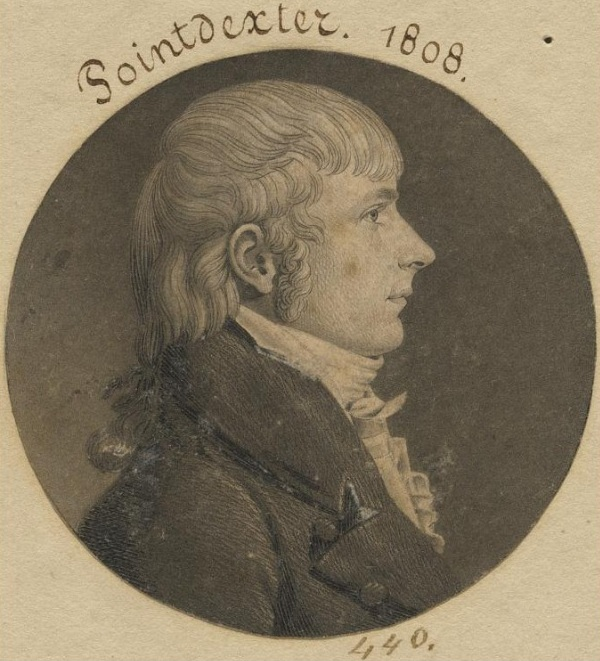
George Poindexter, 1808

After moving to the Mississippi Territory in 1802, Poindexter set up his law practice in Natchez. He soon became a friend of Governor William C. C. Claiborne, and a leader in the local Democratic-Republican Party. As a result, in 1803, he was appointed Attorney General of the Territory; he served until 1807, when he took up his duties as a member of the Territorial House of Representatives, to which he had been elected in 1806. (He had been an unsuccessful candidate for the legislature in 1804.)

During Mississippi's early years, nearby areas were under Spanish control. When tensions rose over Mississippi's expansion, and the Spanish threatened an attack, residents of Adams County formed a militia; Poindexter was one of the main organizers of a company in Natchez, the Mississippi Blues; he was elected commander with the rank of captain. No attack from Spain materialized, and the militia soon disbanded.

When former U.S. Vice President Aaron Burr appeared in Mississippi while traveling south as part of the Burr conspiracy in 1807, acting Governor Cowles Mead declared martial law, appointed Poindexter and William B. Shields as aides-de-camp on his military staff, and sent them to interview Burr and determine his intentions. When Burr was arrested, Poindexter conducted the prosecution until Burr escaped from custody. Poindexter initially "refused to bring charges, on the ground that Burr had committed no crime within the jurisdiction." After Burr escaped, Governor Robert Williams returned from vacation at his home in North Carolina to personally take control of the situation; he criticized Mead and fired the militia officers Mead had appointed, including Poindexter.

== Territorial delegate to Congress ==
Poindexter was elected as a delegate to the United States House of Representatives from the Mississippi Territory; he served in the 10th, 11th and 12th Congresses (1807 to 1813). As a delegate, Poindexter concentrated his efforts largely on questions germane to Mississippi, such as federal patronage, as well as advocating for Mississippi's admission to the United States. Poindexter also worked to resolve and standardize land titles in Mississippi, where residents possessed deeds and grants from Spain, France, England, and the United States, due to the number of times the area had changed hands. He also opposed those who claimed the Yazoo lands, but in 1810 the United States Supreme Court's ruling in Fletcher v. Peck, resolved the claims in their favor.

Before leaving for Washington, DC to begin his duties, Mead informed Poindexter of disparaging comments Williams had made to Mead about Poindexter following Burr's escape. Poindexter responded by challenging Williams to a duel; Williams replied that he would admit to any comment Mead attributed to him, but that he would not "involve either his public or private character with such a man." Poindexter responded by writing letters to the editor that made it appear that he had been wronged by Williams and was unable to obtain satisfaction, which had the effect of making Williams appear cowardly in the eyes of his constituents.

Poindexter was in Richmond in October 1807 to testify at Burr's treason trial; his testimony suggested that Burr's arrest had been based on flimsy evidence, which probably played a part in Burr's acquittal.

In 1811, Poindexter's outspoken opposition to the Federalist Party resulted in a duel with wealthy merchant and planter Abijah Hunt. Poindexter killed Hunt, but afterward, Poindexter's political opponents alleged that he had broken the code duello by firing at Hunt prematurely.

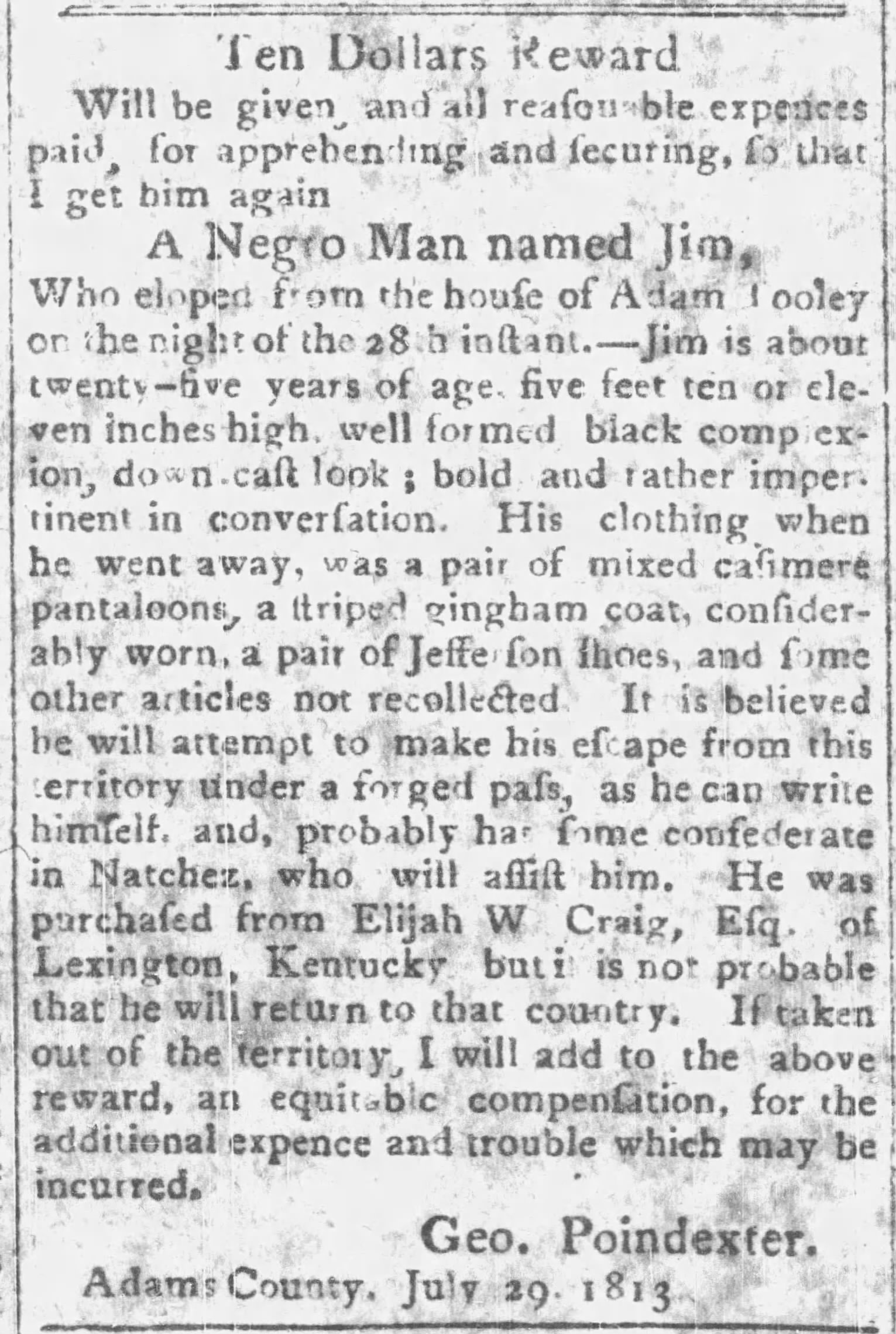
Poindexter offered a $10 reward for the recovery of Jim, who had been trafficked from Kentucky, was "bold and rather impertinent in conversation," and whose literacy would have enabled him to forge a slave pass (Natchez Gazette, August 4, 1813)

== Judgeship ==
Poindexter did not run for reelection in 1812; after his final term in Congress ended, he was appointed federal Judge for the Mississippi Territory and served from 1813 to 1817. Poindexter also served as a volunteer aide to William Carroll as Carroll commanded a division of Tennessee militia at the War of 1812's decisive 1815 Battle of New Orleans.

== Beauty and Booty ==
After the Battle of New Orleans, a Poindexter letter dated January 20, 1815, was published in the Mississippi Republican, which claimed that Pakenham's troops had used "Beauty and Booty" as a watchword. This claim was republished in Niles' Weekly Register, the National Intelligencer, and other newspapers. Political opponents and the editor of the Mississippi Republican challenged Poindexter's account based on Poindexter's supposed dereliction of duty on the day of the battle. In March 1815, Poindexter confronted the editor and was subsequently arrested for assault. The "beauty or booty" story had a profound effect on how the war was perceived and became central to contemporary accounts of Jackson's victory because it made the British appear to be degenerates bent on rape and plunder, while the Americans were depicted as benevolent and morally superior for the charity and medical aid they rendered to British troops after the fighting.

== House of Representatives ==
Poindexter was chair of the committee appointed to draft a constitution for the new state of Mississippi. After its admission in 1817, he was elected to be the state's first representative in Congress. He served in the 15th Congress from 1817 to 1819, when he chaired the Committee on Public Lands. During the course of the 1819 Congressional investigation into Andrew Jackson's seizure of Florida, Poindexter defended Jackson against Henry Clay's charges that Jackson's lawlessness was like the nascent despotism of Julius Caesar in Gaul, suggesting other, more favorable, comparisons instead: "Greece had her Miltiades, Rome her Bellisarius [sic], Carthage her Hannibal, and may we...profit by the example!"

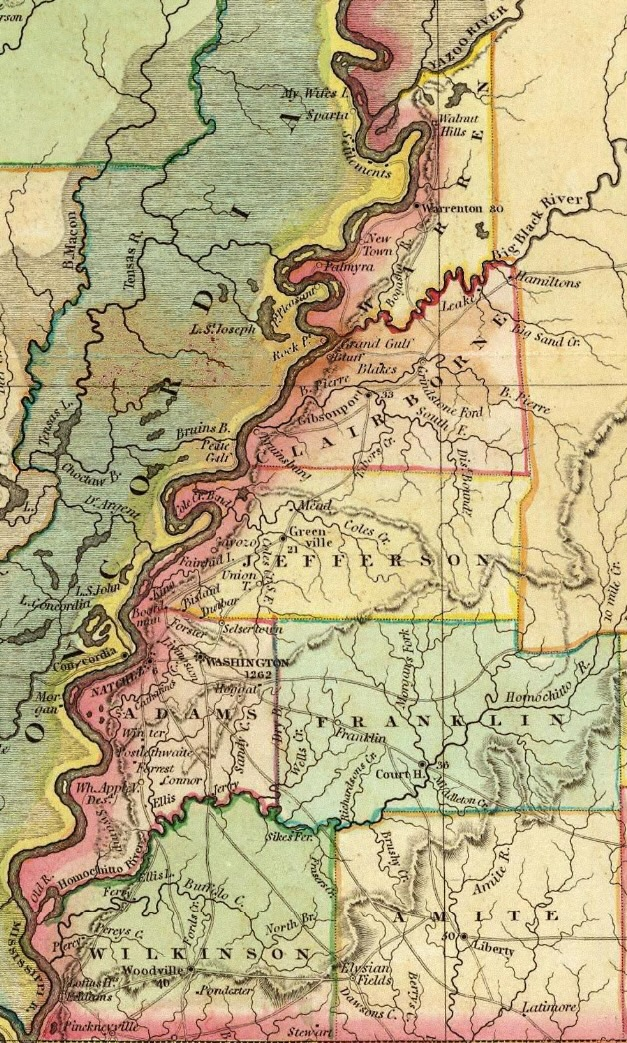
1823 map of the Natchez District, showing Poindexter's plantation near the boundary line

After that, he was an unsuccessful candidate for the U.S. House of Representatives in 1820 to the 17th Congress and in 1822 to the 18th Congress.

== Governor of Mississippi ==
In 1819 Poindexter was elected the second Governor of Mississippi by a large margin, winning over 60% of the vote in the general election. He served from 1820 to 1822. During his time in office he oversaw a reorganization of the militia, the state created its first free public schools, state courts were reorganized, and Jackson was selected as the site for the state capital.

== United States Senate ==
Poindexter was appointed to the United States Senate in 1830 to fill the vacancy caused by the death of Robert H. Adams and served from 1830 to 1835. Soon after his appointment, he learned of the financial distress of Martha Jefferson Randolph, whose father Thomas Jefferson had left an estate heavily encumbered by debt. Poindexter introduced a bill to grant Randolph 50,000 acres in Virginia, with the idea she could sell the land to raise money to live on. The bill failed to pass the Senate and was rejected by the two Virginia senators in 1831.

Poindexter served as chairman of the Committee on Private Land Claims in the 22nd Congress from 1831 to 1833, of the Committee on Public Lands in the 23rd Congress from 1833 to 1835 and was President pro tempore of the Senate from June to November 1834.

Poindexter's tenure as chair of the Committee on Private Land Claims had been then considered moderately controversial. He had espoused some views that could be regarded as socialist regarding government repossession of land. Poindexter was thought to have made these claims to support President Andrew Jackson's fight with the Second Bank of the United States. He was a supporter of President Jackson and had defended him against calls for censure stemming from Jackson's 1818 invasion of Florida (including the Arbuthnot and Ambrister incident), but had slowly become less happy with the President's policies. Poindexter accused Jackson of relying too heavily on the personal friends who became known as the Kitchen Cabinet as well as favoring personal friends and relations for government jobs, such as Jackson's planned appointment of his nephew Stockley D. Hays to a land office job in Mississippi.

Poindexter was selected to be President pro temp of the Senate in 1834, but Jacksonians objected with one newspaper bringing up Poindexter's alleged drinking problem: "One editor said: 'This man...yet rank with the fumes of a low debauch, his step yet tottering, and his eyes rolling with a drunken leer, this man, all filth and vermon [sic], called, probably, from a brothel or a gin cellar, to the Senate Chamber, this man, they chose...to preside over the Senate of the United States.'"

In 1834 Poindexter had his home in Washington, D.C. painted by Richard Lawrence. A deranged man, Lawrence came to believe that he was the ruler of England and the United States and that Jackson was a usurper. In January 1835, Lawrence attempted to shoot at Jackson using two pistols, which misfired. The assassination attempt occurred as Jackson attended a memorial service for a Congressman at the U.S. capitol and the first attempt to assassinate a president. Jackson accused various political enemies of being behind Lawrence's actions, including Poindexter, who denied any connection. Poindexter also took issue with Vice President Martin Van Buren's support of Jackson during the debate over the Bank and made explicit threats that caused Van Buren to carry pistols for self-defense when presiding over the Senate. The accusations about Lawrence followed Poindexter back to Mississippi, and he was unsuccessful in running for a second term. Poindexter returned to Mississippi, embittered by these issues.

== Retirement from politics ==
In 1835, Poindexter moved to Kentucky, where he continued practicing law in Lexington. He later moved back to Jackson, Mississippi and resumed his law practice until his death there on September 5, 1853. He was a gambler and an alcoholic, with alcohol dependence being a significant contributing factor to his death. He was interred in Greenwood Cemetery in Jackson.

== Personal ==
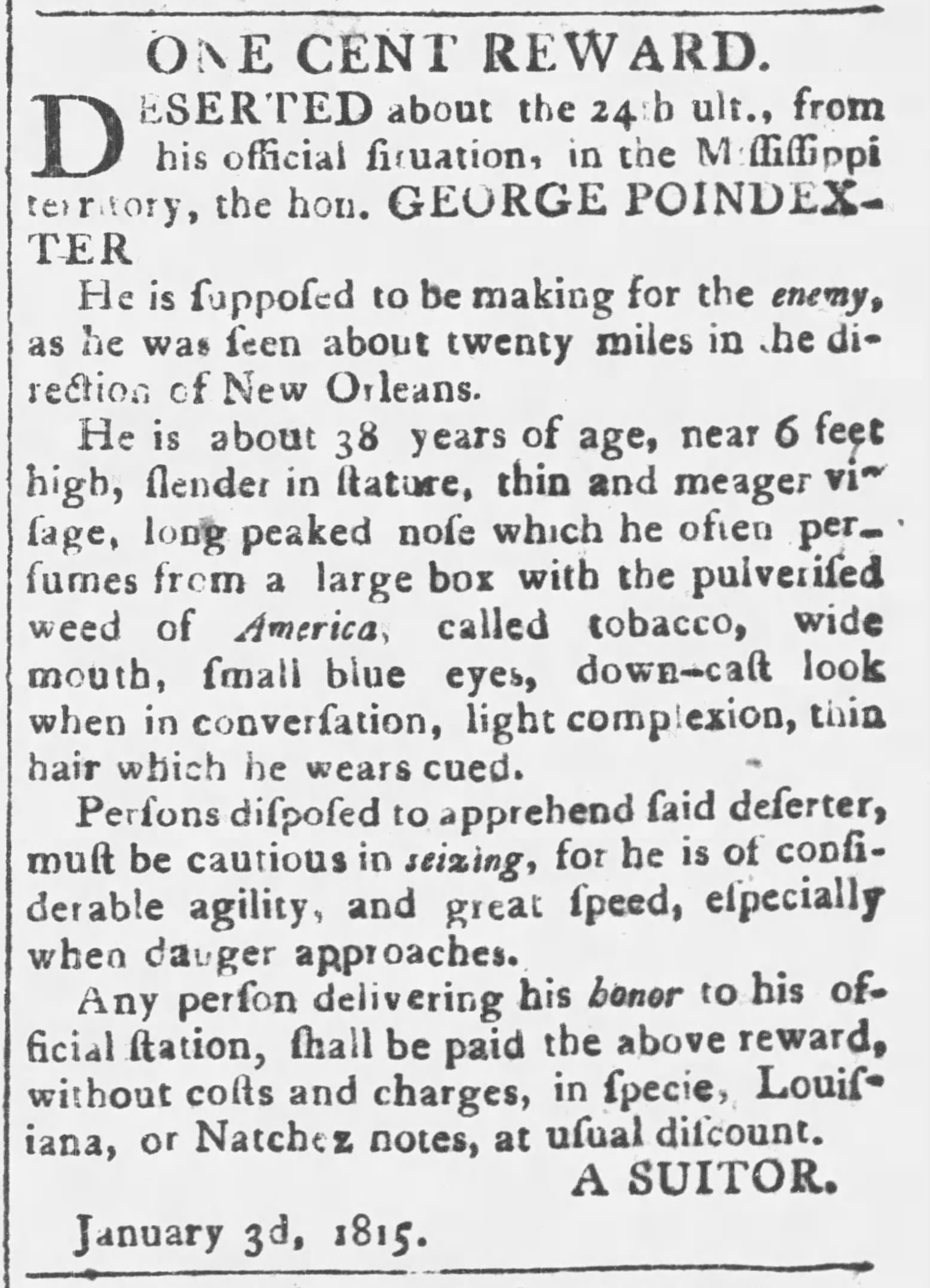
Vintage hateration: this mock lost-and-found advertisement included a canny physical description of Poindexter ("One Cent Reward" Natchez Gazette, January 4, 1815)

In 1804 Poindexter married Lydia Carter (1789–1824), the daughter of a prominent Natchez businessman and plantation owner. They had two sons, George Littleton (or Lytleton) and Albert Gallatin. They divorced after Poindexter publicly accused his wife of infidelity and claimed that their second child, whom he disavowed, was the product of an extramarital affair between his wife and their neighbor. In 1820 Lydia Carter Poindexter married Reverend Lewis Williams and moved to Brimfield, Massachusetts. Her sons remained with her; Poindexter provided for the support of George, but disavowed Albert and refused to provide for him.

In 1816 Poindexter married Agatha Ball Chinn (1794–1822). They had one son who died of yellow fever as a child while Poindexter was Governor, and Agatha Poindexter died soon afterward.

He was said to have a serious, non-consensual liaison with an enslaved woman.

When several years before, Representative Richard Mentor Johnson of Kentucky was criticized for his common-law marriage with Julia Chinn, an enslaved woman; he said, "Unlike Jefferson, Clay, Poindexter and others, I married my wife under the eyes of God, and apparently He has found no objections."

Historian Burke has written,

During slavery times, there was no particular stigma attached to the fact that many southern plantation owners, along with their white overseers, often fathered mulatto children born of black slave women. As long as the white father denied the facts, the customs that created miscegenation were usually overlooked by Southern society.

Johnson violated the norms by acknowledging Chinn as his wife and their daughters as his, plus trying to introduce his daughters to "polite society".

Poindexter reportedly had a strong physical resemblance to Henry Clay. He married his third wife, Ann Hewes of Boston, in 1832.

== Historiography ==
According Charles S. Sydnor, arguably the dean of early 20th-century Mississippi historians, the historical works of J. F. H. Claiborne are essential references for the history of the state but are also riddled with bias against historic enemies of his powerful family and against virtually every notable Mississippi Whig politician. Per Sydnor, Claiborne "was generous in the number of pages allotted to George Poindexter, [but] his treatment of him was harsh and at times grossly unfair."

== See also ==
- List of Mississippi Territory judges

== Sources ==
- Abernethy, Thomas Perkins (1949). "Aaron Burr in Mississippi". The Journal of Southern History. 15 (1): 9–21. doi:10.2307/2198070. ISSN 0022-4642. JSTOR 2198070.
- Eustace, Nicole (2012). 1812: War and the Passions of Patriotism. Philadelphia: University of Pennsylvania Press. ISBN 978-0-81-220636-4.
- Poindexter, George (1929) [1815]. To the Public "A Villain's Censure Is Extorted Praise". A refutation of the calumnies, circulated...by a certain Samuel Brown, and a few unprincipled confederates. Dated Lexington, August 14, 1815; Defense against charges of cowardice at the battle of New Orleans, corruption in office, etc. OCLC 1191844050 – via llmc.com. "This document present evidence against the judge and in protesting Poindexter's animosity against the author, Samuel Brown, as well as supporting the list on the judge's behavior. (Digitized from a microfilm copy of titles originally held by the University of North Carolina Library)."
- Swearingen, Mack Buckley (1934). The Early Life of George Poindexter: A Story of the First Southwest. Chicago, IL: University of Chicago Libraries.

U.S. House of Representatives
Preceded by William Lattimore	Delegate to the U.S. House of Representatives from the Mississippi Territory's at-large congressional district 1807–1813	Succeeded by William Lattimore
Preceded by Cowles Mead; Elect as U.S. Delegate	Member of the U.S. House of Representatives from Mississippi's at-large congressional district 1817–1819	Succeeded by Christopher Rankin
Preceded by Thomas B. Robertson	Chair of the House Public Lands Committee; 1818–1819	Succeeded by Richard Anderson
Party political offices
Preceded by David Holmes	Democratic-Republican nominee for Governor of Mississippi; 1819	Succeeded by Walter Leake
Political offices
Preceded by David Holmes	Governor of Mississippi; 1820–1822	Succeeded by Walter Leake
Preceded by Hugh Lawson White	President pro tempore of the United States Senate; 1834	Succeeded by John Tyler
U.S. Senate
Preceded by Robert H. Adams	U.S. Senator (Class 2) from Mississippi; 1830–1835; Served alongside: Powhatan Ellis, John Black	Succeeded by Robert J. Walker
Preceded by Elias Kane	Chair of the Senate Public Lands Committee; 1833–1835	Succeeded by Thomas Ewing
