= Elihu Creswell =

American slave trader (~1811–1851)

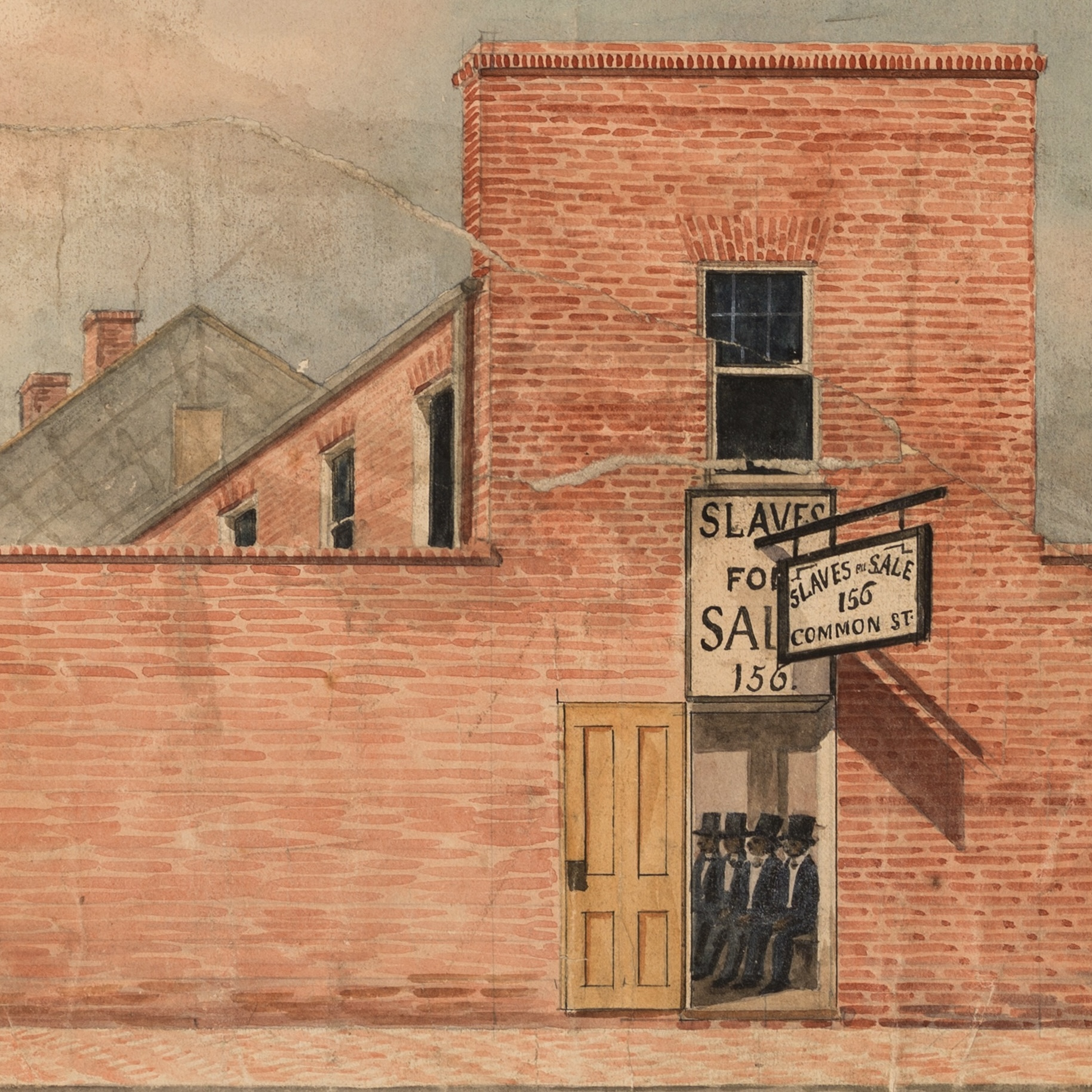
- Slaves for Sale, 156 Common St., watercolor and ink by draftsman Pietro Gualdi, 1855
- Born: c. 1811; Probably Laurens District (later Laurens County), South Carolina, U.S.
- Died: June 19, 1851; New Orleans, Louisiana, U.S.
- Occupation: Slave trader

Elihu Creswell (c. 1811 – June 19, 1851) was an "extensive negro trader" of antebellum Louisiana, United States. Raised in an elite family in the South Carolina Upcountry, Creswell eventually moved to New Orleans, where he specialized in "acclimated" slaves, meaning people who had spent most of their lives enslaved in the Mississippi River basin so they were more likely to have acquired immunity to the region's endemic contagious diseases. This gave him a market niche distinct from many of his competitors, who typically imported slaves from Chesapeake region of the Upper South, or from border states as far as west as Missouri. Unique among slave traders, Creswell's will provided for the manumission of his slaves and moreover provided for their transportation to "the free United States of America." His mother, the other major beneficiary of his will, contested this provision. The legal documentation of the case and the "succession of Elihu Creswell" is a valuable primary source on the slave trade in New Orleans and the history of slavery in Louisiana. A judge ultimately rejected Sarah Hunter Creswell's petition and in 1853 when the steamer Cherokee departed New Orleans, among the passengers aboard were 51 free people of color bound for New York.

== Biography ==
=== Early life and family ===
Elihu Creswell Jr. was likely born around 1811, probably in the Laurens District of South Carolina, where his father owned property. His parents were Elihu Creswell Sr. and his second wife, Mary Hunter, daughter of U.S. Senator John Hunter. Elihu Sr. was the youngest child of Rev. James Creswell and Mollie Garlington of Virginia. The Rev. Creswell was a Presbyterian minister, a Whig by politics, and in "several letters" to the Provincial Committee of Safety for South Carolina, Rev. William Tennent III "mentions Creswell and his activities for the cause of liberty." Creswell's descendants ultimately "owned several thousand acres of land below Ninety Six, along state highway 246." Elihu Creswell Sr. ran stores and "owned large tracts of land in Laurens and Abbeville districts." He and Mary Hunter had nine children together; Elihu Jr. was likely one of the first born of those nine. Elihu Sr. died in South Carolina in 1833.

=== Slave-trading career ===
The beginnings of Elihu Creswell's working life are unclear, but he was reported to have been a resident of Abbeville district, South Carolina prior to moving south. He may have first worked in Alabama and Georgia, before moving to New Orleans on a permanent basis. In April 1842, there was a letter for Creswell at the Macon, Georgia post office. In 1843 he arrived in Charleston from Savannah, Georgia on a packet steamboat. In March 1844, "E. Creswell, Alabama" registered at the Charleston Hotel. There were letters waiting for Creswell in the Macon post office in January and April 1845. There was a letter for him in Mobile, Alabama in June 1845, and "E. Creswell and 2 svts" landed at Mobile from Pensacola, Florida in August. Creswell may have settled in New Orleans for good by 1847, when he placed an ad in the Times-Picayune offering a reward for the return of a stolen pocket watch with a "gold hunting lever, full jeweled, five extra pair jewels, with a heavy gold fob chain and sealed key. The number of the watch is 49,956." In May 1848, the sheriff of Adams County reported via newspaper advertisement that a "quite likely" 23-year-old woman named Charlotte had been placed in the jail at Natchez as a fugitive slave and that she said her legal owner was Elihu Creswell of New Orleans. In both October and November 1848, "E. Creswell, N.O." was one of the guests newly registered at the Charleston Hotel. (Note: It's a small world, so two days after Creswell arrived, H.B. Stowe of New-York registered at the Charleston.)

Ads placed by Creswell in 1848 caught the attention of abolitionist William I. Bowditch, who included two in his 1849 book Slavery and the Constitution.

The following two are found in the Evening Mercury of Jan. 14, 1848, published in New Orleans:—

"Slaves Wanted.—Wanted to purchase, slaves of every description, at the New Orleans depot, No. 156, Common-street, for which liberal prices will be paid. Slaves will also be sold on commission, and purchasers are invited to call and see a well-selected lot of slaves offered at low prices.

Elihu Creswell."

"Slaves Wanted.—E. Creswell, No. 163, Gravier-street, will pay the most liberal price for slaves of all descriptions; and those who have slaves for sale will do well to give him a call before selling to others. He will also exchange slaves, sell slaves on commission; and those who wish to purchase will do well to give him a call before buying elsewhere, as he keeps on hand a good selection of slaves, sold under full guarantee, and good reference for titles given."

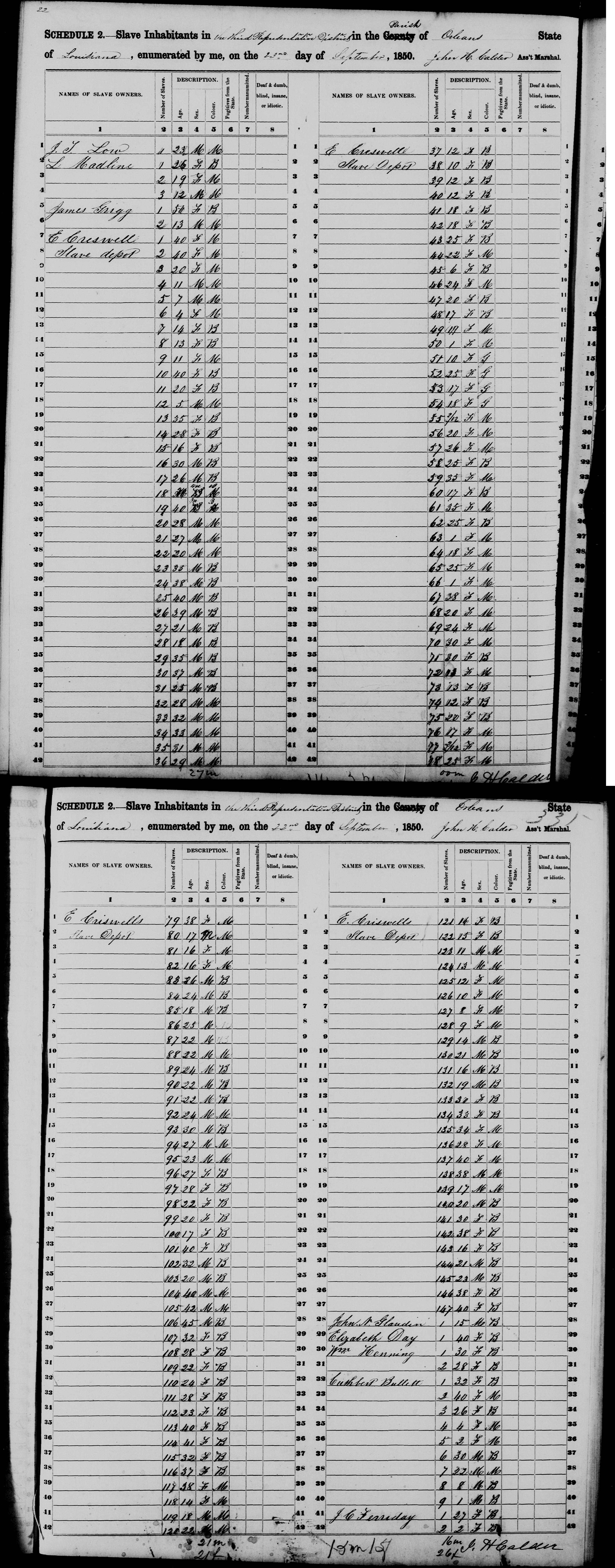
Enumeration for the 1850 census slave schedules of 147 people resident on Monday, September 23, 1850, at "E Creswell Slave Depot" in New Orleans; inmates included three one-year-olds and two two-month-old babies

In 1850 Creswell was advertising regularly in the New Orleans Daily Picayune, offering acclimated slaves to distinguish them from other people available for purchase. On March 8, 1850, Creswell purchased 15-year-old Richard from Christophe Glapion for $450. Richard had lived his whole life with his mother Molly and his brother Louis in the household of Glapion and his consort Marie Laveau, the famed "voodoo priestess" of New Orleans. In June 1850, Creswell advertised five people he had for sale on consignment: Ann, age 27, a "superior Plantation Seamstress," and her daughter Julia, 12, and Malinda, "seamstress and hairdresser" and her two children. In July 1850 a runaway slave ad seeking a "tall, yellow" 20-year-old Frances stated that she had recently be purchased from E. Creswell suggested that a "certain individual has her harbored in the Second Municipality and he may send her up the river or across the lake." In August 1850 Creswell sold a "griffone slave for life" named Ann Howard, approximately 22 years old, "guaranteed against all redhibitory vices, maladies, and deficits" to Christopher Pasteur of New Orleans. Creswell had purchased Ann Howard from Roselamine Allaine on July 18, 1850, and valued her at $650. Ann Howard, 22, was exchanged for Henry, approximately 13 years old. Henry was guaranteed against maladies and deficits but not vices, as he had run away in the past. Henry was valued at $450. Pasteur had previously purchased Henry in September 1849 from William H. Kitchin. To equalize the value, Pasteur paid Creswell $100 cash at the time of transaction and owned another $100 plus eight percent annual interest due on November 1, 1851. By the end of the year 1850, Creswell was regularly advertising that he wished to purchase 100 slaves for resale and that "highest cash prices will be paid. Citizens and merchants who have slaves for sale will please call before leaving their slaves with other persons. Elihu Creswell, 156 Common st."

In early 1851 Creswell sold an enslaved man named Lewis who ended up running away in Missouri and dying shortly thereafter. In the ensuing lawsuit seeking civil damages, one of the parties to the deal testified that Creswell "did not keep the negro in his yard because said Negro was not a saleable negro, or such a one as he would wish to associate with his negroes." Another lawsuit from this period involved the death of heavily pregnant Clarissa who had two young children, was sold by Creswell, and was transported to Arkansas where she died before giving birth. Her new owner, David R. Coulter, paid for three autopsies, the first done while her body was still warm, to prove that he had been sold a defective product. (The autopsy determined angina pectoris was the likely cause of death.) Creswell defended himself in court, insisting that Coulter should have availed himself of a physician if he had any reason to believe Clarissa was ailing and stated that Coulter should have "had more humanity" than to transport a heavily pregnant woman over the rutted country roads of rural Arkansas. (Note: Clarissa's story and Creswell's testimony inspired the Rachel Kranz novel Leaps of Faith.) In spring or early summer 1851, two little girls were taken from the custody of their mother Sarah Ann, age 22 or 24, and grandmother Charity, and placed in Creswell's slave depot. A man named C. R. Payne claimed that Charity had not in fact successfully purchased the freedom of Sarah Ann and herself, and that he, in fact, had a right to legal possession and resale of the children. Judge Larue had the case and would consider the arguments.

=== Creswell's slave depot ===
Historians researching slavery in New Orleans have been able to determine some details about Creswell's treatment of the people he owned: He had a separate room in his pen where he could confine the sick separate from the healthy; and he made payments to medical care providers to have "slaves' teeth pulled" and to provide them with medicine. He also sought to "hire out" the people he owned to the maximum extent possible. According to historian Maurie McInnis, Creswell's slave mart was a "two-story brick commercial structure fronted on Common Street, a block west of the St. Charles Hotel. A sign outside read 'Slaves for Sale 156 Common Street,' and a door opened onto a salesroom. Behind this narrow building was a wider building that perhaps served as the jail. In the lot next door, a large open space at the front probably was used as the yard...[and a] high brick wall, at least 10 feet high, 'to prevent slaves from being seen from the street,' as the ordinance specified. That wall, the only thing slaves could see from the yard, cut them off from communication outside the pen."

== Death and legacy ==
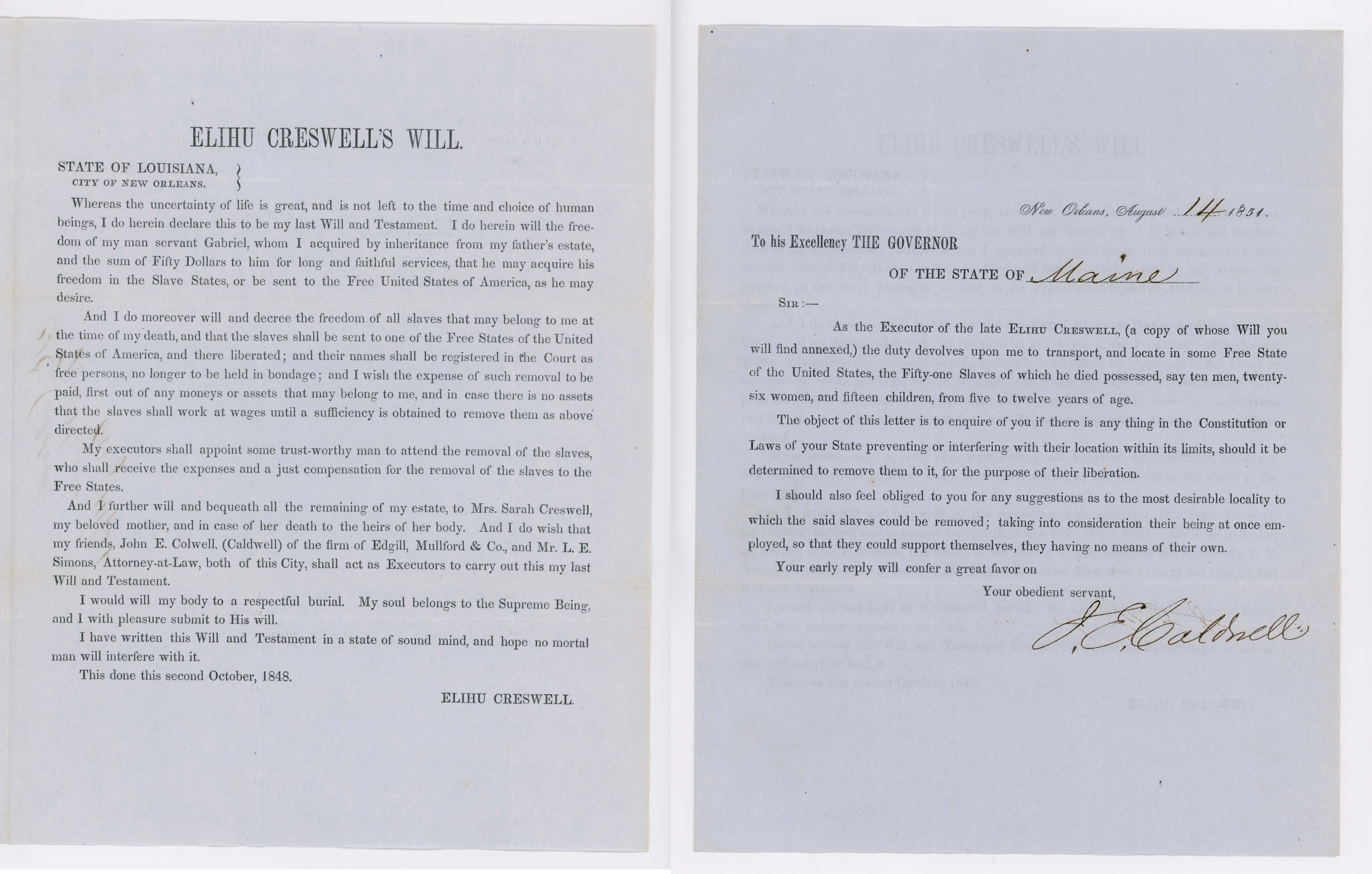
Printed copy of Creswell's will, and form letter from his executor asking if Maine had any laws that would prohibit immigration by free people of color (Maine State Archives 185141-F026)

A compilation of genealogical records related to the Creswell–Criswell surname that was published in 1966 provides a not-entirely-reliable capsule biography of Elihu Creswell Jr. of Laurens, South Carolina:

[Elihu Creswell] was a lawyer at New Orleans. Never married. Owned site occupied in 1959 by St. Charles Hotel, and a large plantation adjoining. Died in New Orleans of typhus fever 20 May 1851, leaving estate of $60,000 to his mother."

There is no secondary evidence that Creswell was an attorney, nor that the cause of his death was typhus—one academic history reports that Creswell's cause of death was typhoid fever. The never-married and "left his mother a large estate" details are correct. Creswell's slave pen was not plantation-adjacent, but it was in proximity to the St. Charles Hotel. After the American Civil War, descendants often "scrubbed" the reputations of their slave-trading relations, disguising their antebellum careers with euphemisms like "was in the mercantile business," or by claiming that they had worked as "brokers" or "cotton traders" or even "gamblers."

Creswell's legacy, however, is unique in the history of the slave trade in the United States. When he wrote out his will in 1848, he left directions that Gabriel, a slave he had inherited from his family, be freed and given US$50 (equivalent to $1,935 in 2025). All the other slaves he owned were also freed by his will, and Creswell ordered that "some trustworthy man" be appointed to relocate them to the "free United States," expenses paid.

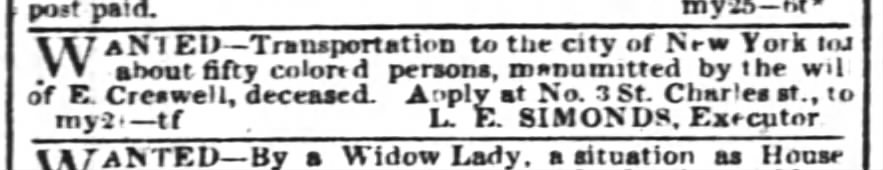
"Wanted" New Orleans Times-Picayune, May 28, 1852

Creswell's mother was due the balance of his estate, valued at tens of thousands of dollars, and she sued to prevent the manumission of the slaves. The case went to the Louisiana courts: "One of Creswell's appointed executors failed to keep the funds of the succession in a bank, as required by law. For this irregularity, the probate court dismissed him and fined him 20 percent of the value of the succession. He sued for his commission on the value of the succession (a fee to compensate executors for their services), including the value of the slaves, whom he had made no attempt to emancipate. The probate court refused to include the slaves in the evaluation. Justice Rost affirmed the decision. A new executor emancipated the slaves and subsequently sent them to New York." Caldwell's executor apparently inquired with several U.S. states, including New York and Maine, about whether they had laws preventing the immigration of manumitted former slaves. One historian stated that "except for an orphaned infant who obviously could not care for herself and a slave too ill to make the journey, [all] were eventually taken by Creswell's executor to New York and set free." The forced migration of 51 people, away from the home where Creswell's "acclimated slaves" had likely been born and raised took place in 1853, when the packet steamship Cherokee departed New Orleans for New York. (Note: The Cherokee was a merchant steamship built in 1848 that typically ran a triangular route between New Orleans, New York, and Havana. She burned at the dock in Charleston in August 1853, shortly after having returned from her trip delivering the manumitted former slaves of Elihu Creswell to New York City.) The New Orleans Picayune claimed that only 32 were willing to leave Louisiana, while according to Ulrich B. Phillips, DeBow's Review claimed that "some of the slaves were so miserable in New York that they begged the executor to return them to Louisiana, even if it meant selling them as slaves." Creswell's slave pen was later used by a trader named Charles Lamarque Jr., who encountered some financial difficulty and had to sell the building in 1855. A draftsman filed a watercolor and ink illustration with the New Orleans Notarial Department at the time of the sale. This image, depicting the antebellum slave trade in New Orleans, is considered valuable by historians.

As historian Steven Deyle put it in Carry Me Back (2005): "While there is no record of any slave traders feeling guilt over what they did for a living, the actions taken by the New Orleans dealer Elihu Creswell do raise some questions."

It is ironic that Elihu Cresswell, who spent his adult life transferring slave property from one owner to another, would provide for the emancipation of his slaves upon his death, thereby transforming them under the law from property into free persons by means of a relatively simple legal action. This overnight metamorphosis from slavery to freedom was not an uncommon occurrence in antebellum Louisiana, indicating that not only this one slave trader, but many other whites as well, remained unconvinced in their hearts by proslavery rhetoric insisting that blacks were by nature content in slavery.

— Judith Kelleher Schafer, Slavery, the Civil Law, and the Supreme Court of Louisiana (1994)

== See also ==
- Slave markets and slave jails in the United States
- List of American slave traders
- History of slavery in Louisiana
- Bibliography of the slave trade in the United States
- Bernard Kendig – American slave trader (~1813–1872)
