= Wilkinson Academy =

Defunct Mississippi school (1815–1830s)

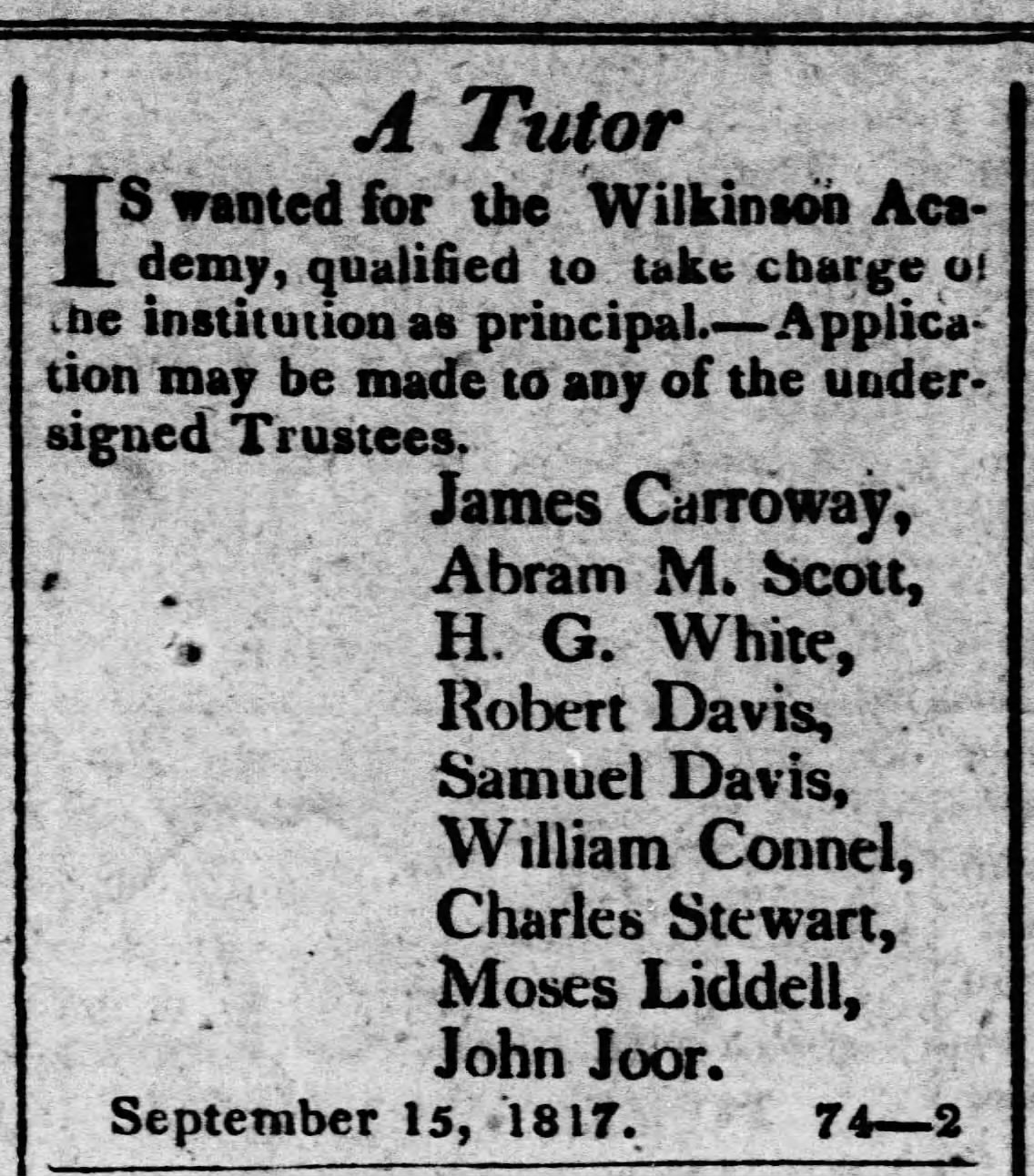
"Wilkinson Academy" Mississippi Free Trader, September 24, 1817

Wilkinson Academy was a private school for boys, located in the Natchez District of Mississippi, United States, operating in the early 19th century. It is best known for its role in educating Jefferson Davis, later president of the Confederate States of America. Housed in a log cabin, with one male teacher, the school existed to educate the sons of the local planter class dwelling in the vicinity of Wilkinson County, a southwestern county in what is today the state of Mississippi. Located a mile or two outside of the county seat of Woodville, the school was organized in 1815 in what was then Mississippi Territory and existed for about 20 years.

== History ==
The school was incorporated in what was then Wilkinson County, Mississippi Territory in December 1815. The board of directors at the time of establishment included John Cutler, Abram M. Scott, Joseph Johnson, Wm. Connel, John B. Posey, John Nugent, Wm. Vaughan, Micajah Frazier, and R. G. Leckie. Two other schools were incorporated in Wilkinson County in 1814 and 1815: the Jackson Academy, and Pickneyville Academy at Pickneyville. Trustees of Wilkinson Academy in 1817 included Scott, Moses Liddell, John Joor, and two Davises. Samuel Davis may have been Jefferson Davis' father or older brother. A Wilkinson Female Academy, also run out of a log cabin, was established near Woodville in 1819.

Davis started his schooling with a brief stint at age 10 at Jefferson College, located further north near Natchez before switching to the Wilkinson Academy. Davis' experience there was described in an "autobiographical sketch" he wrote in 1889:

"I had been there but a short time when the County Academy of Wilkinson was organized, and I returned home and went daily from my father's house to the school-house until I was sufficiently advanced to be sent to the college known as the Transylvania University of Kentucky. At the head of the County Academy was a scholarly man named John A. Shaw, from Boston. He took on himself, also, the duty of preaching every Sunday; but as there was no church, he held his meetings in the court-house. The boys of the Academy were required to attend, and very soon they became his only audience...He was a quiet, just man, and I am sure he taught me more in the time I was with him than I ever learned from any one else. He married in our county, and after the death of his wife returned to Massachusetts; but, whether he acquired new tastes during his residence in the South, or from whatever reason, he returned after some years to New Orleans, where he was Superintendent of the Public Schools when I last heard from him. I was very much gratified to learn that he remembered me favorably, and mentioned it to one of his pupils who had been named for me. He was the first of a new class of teachers in our neighborhood, and was followed by classical scholars who raised the standard of ability to teach and of the pupils to learn."

Wilkinson Academy's main teacher in early days was "placed in charge of John Angier Shaw, M.A., of Harvard University, in 1818, who had been commended to the situation by Levi Hedge, President of Harvard."

According to a history published in 1891, "In the year 1825–6, Mr. Charles H. Talbot, late of Tennessee, was principal; in 1826, Mr. S. Hill; in 1831, Mr. J. A. Shaw; in 1832, Samuel McLelland; in 1833, Mr. Z. S. Lyons; and in 1834, a Mr. Black. Shortly after this it seems to have become extinct." Another batch of schools with similar names was established in the vicinity of the town in the 1830s.

Davis wrote in 1889 that "the log-cabin schools were not public schools in the sense in which that term is used to-day, for the teacher was supported by the fees charged every pupil."

As of 1891 it was said to have been located "near the old cotton factory" outside of Woodville.

== See also ==
- Green Academy – Northern Alabama school, 1812–1864
