= 1st Mississippi Legislature =

1817 to 1818 legislative session

2nd Mississippi Legislature	→

Overview
- Jurisdiction: Mississippi, United States
- Term: October 6, 1817 – February 6, 1818
- Election: September 17, 1817

Mississippi State Senate
- Members: 8
- President: Edward Turner

Mississippi House of Representatives
- Members: 24
- Speaker: Thomas Barnes

The 1st Mississippi Legislature met between October 6, 1817 and February 6, 1818, first in Washington and then in Natchez, Mississippi.

== Background ==
Elections were held on September 17, 1817. Senators and representatives first convened in Washington, Mississippi, between October 6 and October 9, 1817. They then met in Natchez, Mississippi, on December 8, 1817. The Senate adjourned on February 4, 1818.

Senators were to be elected to staggered three-year terms. Lots were drawn to determine how many years each senator's term would last (including the first session) before re-election.

== Senate ==
Two senators, Duncan Stewart and David Dickson, resigned during the recess in between October and December. Joseph Johnson was sworn in to replace Stewart (who had been elected lieutenant governor) on December 9, 1817. Stewart, who was sworn in on December 9, 1817, became the ex officio president of the Senate. Nathaniel Wells was sworn in to replace Dickson on January 2, 1819. The House adjourned on February 6, 1818.

Counties	Senator(s)	Term Years before Next Election
Adams	Henry Postlethwaite	2
Amite	David Lea	2
Jefferson	Hezekiah J. Balch	1
Wilkinson	Duncan Stewart (Oct-Dec. 8, 1817)	3
Wilkinson	Joseph Johnston (Dec. 1818–1819)	3
Franklin, Pike	David Dickson (Oct-Dec 8, 1817)	1
Franklin, Pike	Nathaniel Wells (January 2, 1819)	1
Lawrence, Marion, Hancock	Charles Stovall	1
Warren, Claiborne	Daniel Burnet	3
Wayne, Greene, Jackson	Josiah Skinner	2

== Mississippi House of Representantatives ==
The House met alongside the Senate on October 6, 1817. On that day, Thomas Barnes of Claiborne County was elected Speaker of the House. Then, non-representatives Peter A. Vandorn and John Lowry were elected to the offices of House clerk and doorkeeper respectively. One representative, Benjamin Bullen, resigned in between the October and December meetings. Cowles Mead was sworn in to replace Bullen on December 8, 1817.

County	Representative(s)
Adams	Philander Smith
Adams	Joseph Sessions
Adams	Edward Turner
Adams	Charles B. Green
Amite	David Davis
Amite	Hardy Coward
Amite	Angus Wilkinson
Claiborne	Thomas Barnes
Claiborne	Henry G. Johnston
Franklin	Joseph Winn
Greene	George B. Dameron
Hancock	Noel Jourdan
Jackson	Archibald McManis
Jefferson	Benjamin M. Bullen (Oct-Dec. 1817)
Jefferson	Cowles Mead (Dec. 1817–1818)
Jefferson	Edward Duggan
Lawrence	Harman Runnels
Marion	George M. Nixon
Pike	Elbert Burton
Pike	David Cleveland
Warren	Jacob Hyland
Wayne	William Patton
Wilkinson	Thomas M. Gildart
Wilkinson	Abram M. Scott
Wilkinson	John Joor
