= 3rd Mississippi Legislature =

1820 legislative session

| ← | 2nd Mississippi Legislature | 4th Mississippi Legislature | → |

Overview
- Jurisdiction: Mississippi, United States
- Meeting place: Natchez, Mississippi
- Term: January 3, 1820 – February 12, 1820

Mississippi State Senate
- President: James Patton
- President pro tempore: Joseph Johnson

Mississippi House of Representatives
- Speaker: Edward Turner

The 3rd Mississippi Legislature (then known as the Mississippi General Assembly) met from January 3 to February 12, 1820, in Natchez, Mississippi.

== Senate ==
The Mississippi State Senate was composed of the following. Joseph Johnson was elected President pro tempore of the Senate. James Patton took office as Lieutenant Governor of Mississippi on January 5, 1820, and became the ex officio President of the Mississippi State Senate.

| County District | Senator |
|---|---|
| Adams | White Turpin |
| Adams | Charles B. Green |
| Amite | Thomas Torrence |
| Wilkinson | Joseph Johnson |
| Warren, Claiborne | Henry D. Downs |
| Pike, Marion | David Dickson |
| Green, Jackson, Hancock | Isaac R. Nicholson |
| Jefferson, Franklin | Armstrong Ellis |
| Lawrence, Covington, Wayne | Howell W. Runnels |

== House ==
The Mississippi House of Representatives was composed of the following. Edward Turner was elected Speaker of the House. Non-representatives Peter A. Vandorn and William Mason were elected to the offices of clerk and doorkeeper, respectively.

| County | Senator |
|---|---|
| Adams | Beverly R. Grayson |
| Adams | Lewis Winston |
| Adams | Samuel Montgomery |
| Adams (Natchez) | Edward Turner |
| Amite | David Davis |
| Amite | Zachariah Lea |
| Amite | William Gardner |
| Claiborne | William Willis |
| Claiborne | Stephen D. Carson |
| Covington | John Ship |
| Franklin | Joseph Robertson |
| Franklin | Joseph Winn |
| Green | Hugh McDonald |
| Green | G. B. Dameron |
| Hancock | Noel Jourdan |
| Jackson | Mr. M'Manis |
| Jefferson | Joseph E. Davis |
| Jefferson | Joseph Dunbar |
| Lawrence | Harmon Runnels |
| Lawrence | Joseph Cooper |
| Marion | Francis Lenoir |
| Pike | Vincent Gardner |
| Pike | David Cleaveland |
| Pike | William Dickson |
| Warren | James Gibson |
| Wayne | Josiah Watts |
| Wilkinson | William Johnson |
| Wilkinson | Abram M. Scott |
| Wilkinson | Moses Liddell |
