= Bernard Kendig =

American slave trader (~1813–1872)

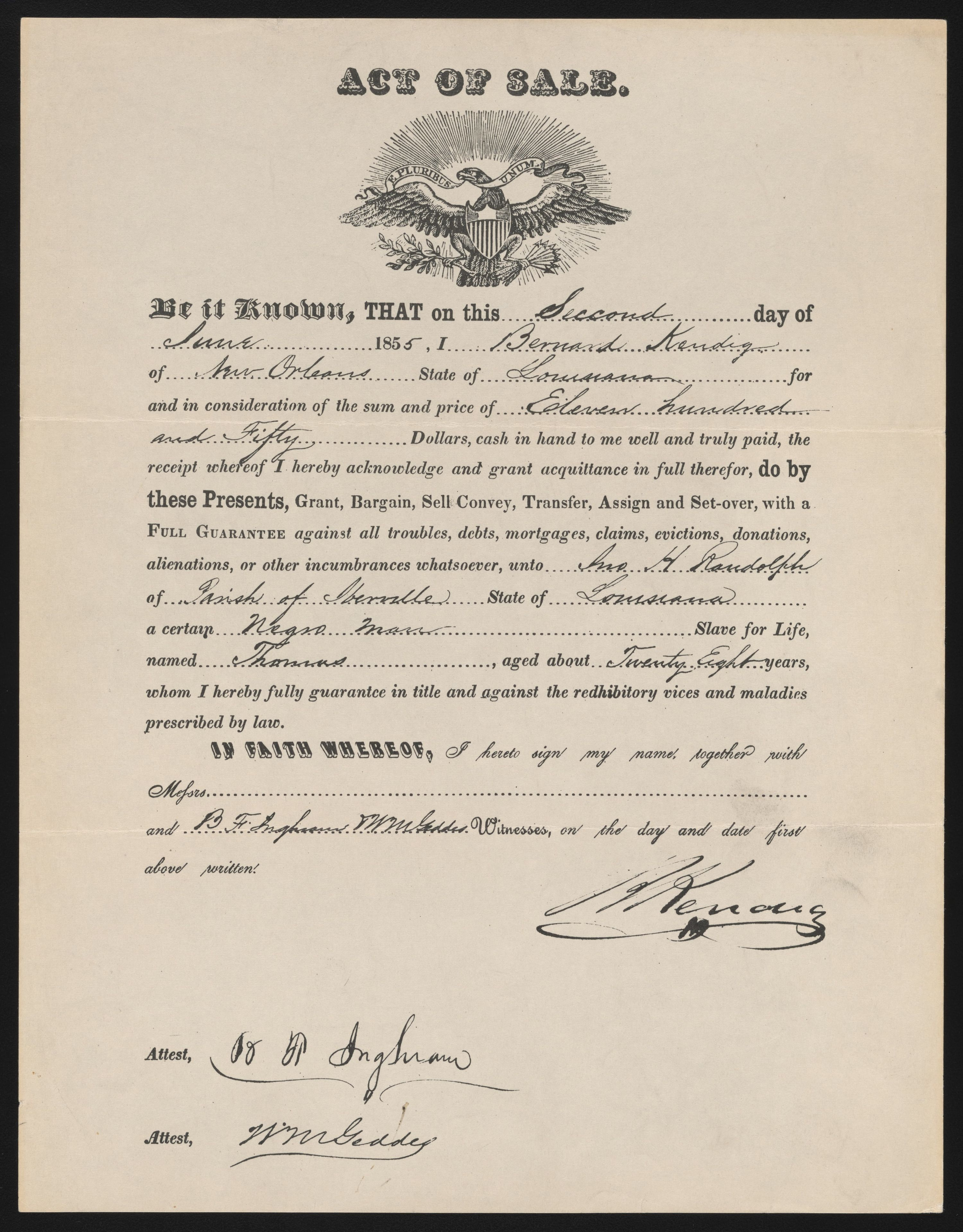
- Thomas was about 28 years old when Bernard Kendig sold him for US$1,150 (equivalent to $38,808 in 2024) to John Hampden Randolph of Iberville Parish, Louisiana in June 1855 (Northwestern University Libraries)
- Born: c. 1813; Pennsylvania, U.S.
- Died: 1872; Probably Pennsylvania, U.S.
- Other names: Barnard Kendig, Barney Kendig
- Known for: Stable owner, auctioneer, slave dealer, real estate agent

Bernard Kendig (c. 1813–1872) was an American slave trader, primarily operating in New Orleans. He sold enslaved people at comparatively low prices, and dealt primarily in and around Louisiana, rather than importing large numbers of enslaved people from the border states or Chesapeake region. Kendig was sued a number of times under Louisiana's redhibition (warranty) laws and accused of having willfully misrepresented the health or character of slaves he sold.

== Life and work ==
Kendig was a native of Pennsylvania, born sometime around 1813. Once established as a businessman in New Orleans he first owned a stable and later moved from dealing in livestock to dealing in human chattel. Kendig was considered a strictly local (rather than cross-country) slave trader of New Orleans and environs. A former partner described Kendig's working life in a court case: "Kendig is in the Negro trade; has seen him bidding on Negroes; sees him often in Negro traders' yards; saw him there again this morning." Kendig was somewhat unusual relative to his peers in that he primarily bought slaves from in and around Louisiana, rather than importing them from the Upper South. Similarly, Kendig was somewhat unusual relative to his peers in that the majority of his customers were probably from New Orleans rather than from more rural regions of the Mississippi River valley occupied by sugar and cotton plantation owners and their enslaved work forces. Kendig did little marketing and did not own his own slave jail, which may have contributed to his relatively lower prices for enslaved people compared to other New Orleans slavers.

Kendig most likely began in the New Orleans slave-trading business in or before 1839. Between 1852 and 1860 notarial records show that he sold at least 758 people (or about 95 people a year). In 1845, "Kendig's auction store" in New Orleans was the site of an attempted murder. A woman named Henrietta Blanchard sought out a "negro trader" named Parker Pettiway at Kendig's and shot him in the gut. When asked the motive, Blanchard replied, "He knows." It is unclear if this Kendig in this report is Bernard Kendig or Benjamin Kendig, another local broker. The two Kendigs sometimes did business together, and they may have been related, although there is no known evidence proving a familial connection. Other characters on the stage may be a third local businessman with the same surname, Henry B. Kendig, and widow Mathilda Kendig Bushy (or Bushey), who was Bernard Kendig's aunt and for whom Kendig testified that he acted as trading agent (and power of attorney), buying slaves with her money and acting at her direction.

Kendig frequently sought medical assessment and/or care for enslaved people at New Orleans' Touro Infirmary because upon release Kendig was provided with a certificate that his human property had been treated, which he could then turn around and use as validation and as a selling point. Along with Thomas Foster, Kendig was one "of the largest and the wealthiest of the slave traders doing business with Touro in its antebellum phase." An analysis of the Touro admission books by historian Stephen Kenny finds "all but four of the slave patients Kendig sent to Touro Infirmary were born outside of New Orleans...As the majority of Kendig's slave patients are recorded as having spent between six and sixteen weeks in the city, this suggests that while Kendig was not a major importer of slaves, the slaves that he did import were those in his stock of human property most in need of medical attention."

Kendig was sued 13 times beginning in 1850. He was repeatedly accused of misrepresenting the health or character of enslaved people he sold. An example of the kind of lawsuits brought against Kendig is the 1860 petition of Thomas Gatlin to the Fourth District Court of New Orleans, as summarized by the Digital Library on American Slavery Race and Slavery Petitions database and published under a Creative Commons license:

Major Thomas Gatlin, a resident of Arkansas, asks the court to nullify the sale of a slave. In February 1858, Gatlin purchased a slave named Jim for $1,200 from Bernard Kendig of New Orleans. Kendig warranted the slave "free from all redhibitory vices of body & character." However, in May, "without having been chastised or otherwise ill-treated," Jim ran away. Gatlin avers that, before "a year had elapsed from the date of the sale," he came to New Orleans and "informed Kendig in person of the conduct of the negro, & demanded of him a recession of the sale, which was refused." In the fall of 1859, Jim was apprehended in Henderson, Texas, and when Gatlin went to collect him, he found him "in jail, suffering from a severe gun-shot wound which he had received in being taken." While there, Gatlin was informed that Dr. R. G. Graham had previously owned Jim and that the slave had also run away from him. Soon after, Gatlin learned that Kendig had previously sold the slave to Judge John F. Williams of Marshall, Texas, from whom the slave had also run away, and who had returned the slave to Kendig only days before Gatlin purchased him. In consequence, Gatlin prays that his purchase of Jim be nullified and that Kendig be ordered to refund the purchase price plus $500 for damages and expenses.

According to historian Richard Tansey, Kendig's business practices made him rich: As of 1860, Kendig claimed he "owned US$64,000 (equivalent to $2,239,763 in 2024) in real estate and an other US$64,000 (equivalent to $2,239,763 in 2024) in personal wealth. Only two of the thirty-four slave dealers listed in this census owned more wealth. Thus, Kendig was among the wealthiest members of the slave trading fraternity."

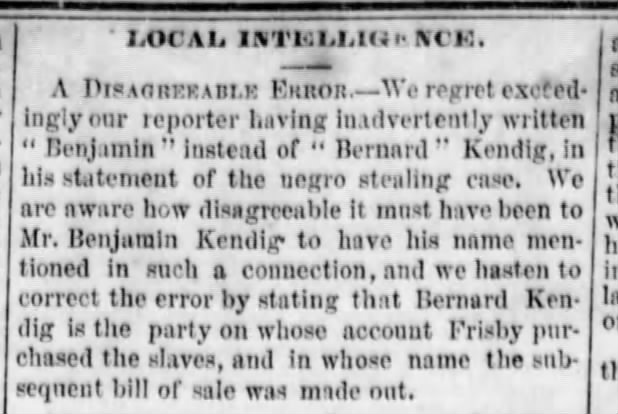
Distinguish: Bernard Kendig is not to be confused with Benjamin Kendig, also a slave trader of New Orleans ("A disagreeable error" The Daily Delta, September 2, 1857)

In 1859, Bernard Kendig of New Orleans bought a historic farm in Sadsbury, Chester County, Pennsylvania for about US$11,305 (equivalent to $395,633 in 2024) In 1866, Kendig's barn caught fire for unknown reasons, destroying the building and "one calf, all the wagon harnesses, and other contents." Bernard Kendig is listed as a decedent of 1872 and father to Franklin Kendig in the decedents' index of the Chester County, Pennsylvania Orphans' Court Minors Files of 1714–1881. In 1873, the Sadsbury farm of Benjamin Kendig, deceased, consisting of 211 acres of land and improvements, was listed for sale.

== See also ==
- List of American slave traders
- History of slavery in Louisiana
- Elihu Creswell – American slave trader (~1811–1851)
