= Green Academy =

Northern Alabama school, 1812–1864

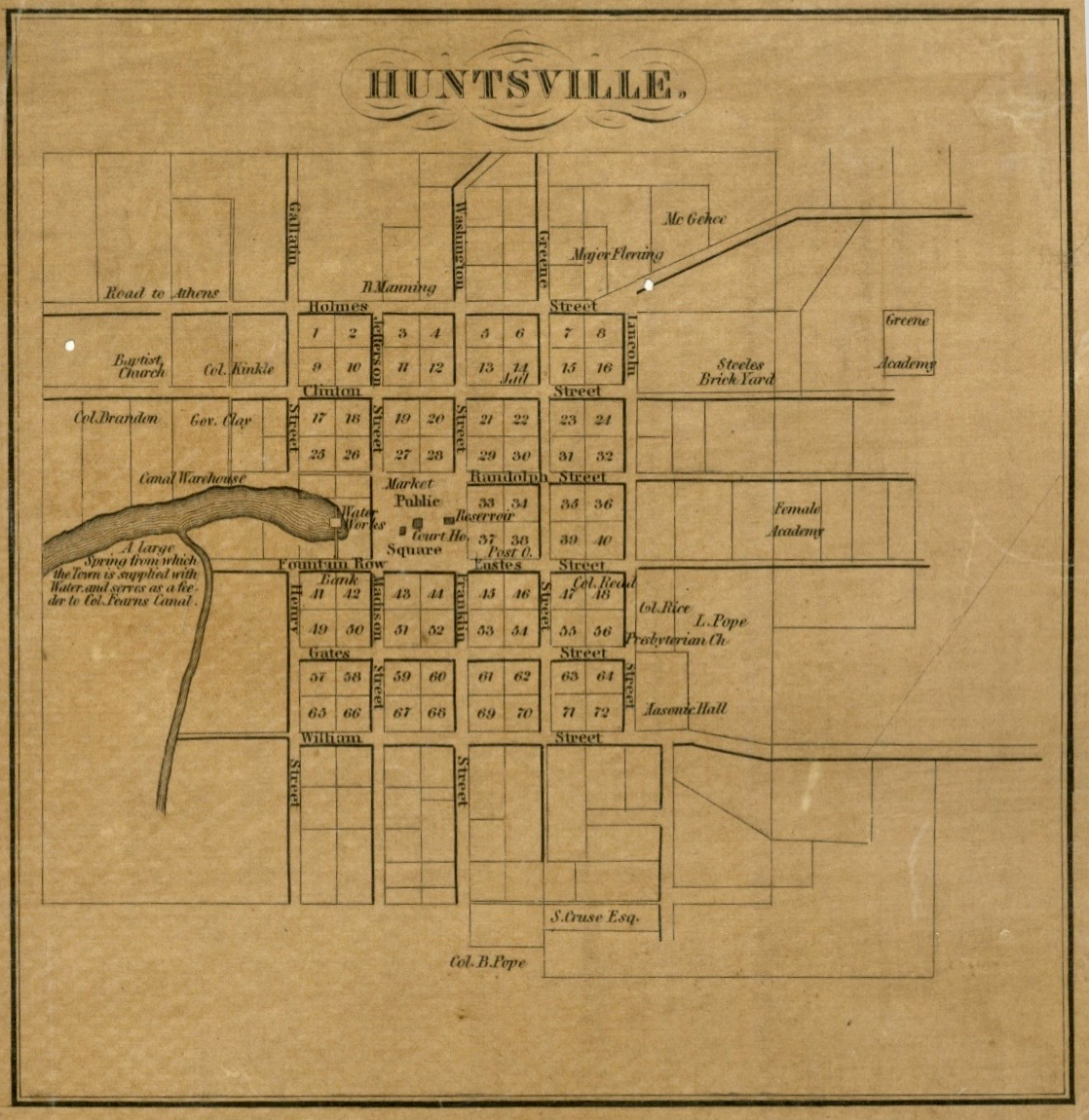
Green Academy (top right) in Huntsville, Alabama, on John LaTourette's An Accurate Map of the State of Alabama and West Florida (1837)

Green Academy was a 19th-century school in Huntsville, Alabama, United States. It was the only school operating in north Alabama in the first quarter of the 19th century, and it only educated white boys, up to a total enrollment of about 50. Green Academy predated the University of Alabama by almost 20 years.

Most accounts credit land speculator and veteran of Andrew Jackson's military expeditions John Brahan and his wife Mary Weakley Brahan as the source of the land on which the school stood. (There are also claims that the land was donated by William Smith, a U.S. Senator from South Carolina and a lifelong friend of Andrew Jackson.) The school opened under a charter from the Mississippi Territorial Legislature in 1812. No buildings were constructed until 1819. Most of the construction funding, about $2,000, came from the sale of stock in Planters' & Merchants' Bank at Huntsville. At what was probably its height in 1845, the school had a staff of four: the principal, and three teachers. Among the alumni were Clement Claiborne Clay, later a Senator, and Confederate General Edward Asbury O'Neal.

During the American Civil War, U.S. troops were quartered at the school, including the 15th Kentucky and "Gen. Crook's troops," according to the wartime journal of Mary Jane Chadick. The school buildings were burned down by U.S. troops on November 26, 1864, and never reconstructed. Mrs. Chadick wrote: "They were burning the papers belonging to the provost marshal's office in the courthouse yard, and there was a great stir among the enemy generally. It is said that Rebel cavalry are hovering in the neighborhood, and that seven negro soldiers were killed today near the house of Charley Strong. The enemy all expect to get away by morning. The soldiers threaten to burn the town, and there is a strong guard out to prevent it. Green Academy is burning at this moment. Many families in town are left without a single servant, all gone to the Yankees. The country all around the depot is perfectly black with them."

The land was later used for the City School of Huntsville, at the intersection of Calhoun and East Clinton. The city built a wood-frame school there in the 1880s, and then a brick-built school in 1905, and East Clinton Elementary School was built on the site in 1938. The 1938 building has been preserved and was the site of Providence Classical School as of 2017.

== See also ==
- Timeline of Huntsville, Alabama
- Wilkinson Academy – Defunct Mississippi school (1815–1830s)
- Jefferson College (Mississippi) – Defunct school, chartered 1802
