= Henry C. Castellanos =

American judge

Henry C. Castellanos (1828–1896) was a New Orleans attorney, judge, and author. He wrote the antebellum compendium New Orleans As It Was, in 1895. It was reissued in 2006, with an introduction by Judith Kelleher Schafer.
