= Moses Liddell =

Mississippi planter (1785–1856)

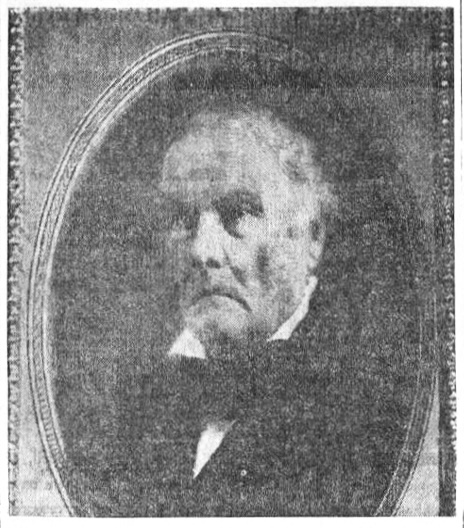
Moses Liddell

Moses Liddell (March 5, 1785 – June 13, 1856) was a 19th-century American cotton plantation owner and Mississippi state legislator from Wilkinson County, Mississippi.

Moses Liddell was the fourth-born child of Andrew Liddell and Jean Johnston of South Carolina. He grew up in South Carolina but left the Pendleton District for Natchez about 1805 when he was about 20 years old. He settled near Woodville in Wilkinson County around 1812.

As of 1817 he was a trustee of Wilkinson Academy. He served three terms in the Mississippi House of Representatives in 1820, 1822, and 1823. In 1826 he was involved in the organization of the Woodville and Homochitto Turnpike Company. He also served as a county court judge. His property was near that of future U.S. Senator George Poindexter.

He owned sugar plantations in St. Mary Parish with his son-in-law Francis DuBose Richardson. In 1838 he gave his children 80 enslaved people he had inherited from their late mother.

== Personal life ==
In 1814 he married Bethia Frances Richardson at the Hills in Wilkinson County, which was the home of Bethia's sister, Emily Richardson Joor, wife of John Joor (Ioor). Bethia's name was from a ship called Bethia that was later renamed and became the notorious HMS Bounty. According to a descendant, Bethia's father was "William Richardson...a most successful merchant of Charleston, S.C. On October 13, 1768, he married Ann Magdalen Guignard. Although youthful, he soon carved a place for himself in the mercantile business and with a series of successful investments accumulated a large fortune. He continued to reside in Charleston for some years, then moved with his family to his plantation of some 8,000 acres called Bloom Hill on the Wateree River, now Sumter County."

The Liddells had four children who survived to adulthood; Bethia died in 1824 and they were largely raised by her sister in the Joor household.

- St. John Liddell, born John Richardson Liddell, was his son. He was sent to the University of Virginia and then transferred to West Point; he was kicked out after a year for shooting a guy.
- Nancy Liddell married William Griffin and died of illness in 1844.
- Emily Jane Liddell married slave trader and sugar planter John Hampden Randolph; they had 11 kids and lived in Louisiana. Emily Liddell's "dowry included $20,000 and twenty enslaved people, which likely enabled the newlyweds' move to Bayou Goula, Louisiana, in 1841."
- Bethia Frances Liddell married Francis DuBose Richardson; they had two children and sugar plantations near Bayou Teche
