= John Joor =

Mississippi politician (c. 1780–1836)

- Born: John Ioor c. 1780; South Carolina, United States
- Died: May 16, 1836; Mississippi, United States

John Joor (c. 1780 – May 16, 1836) was a Mississippi businessman and politician. HId family name was originally Ioor but he changed the spelling when he moved to Mississippi. Originally from South Carolina, he settled in Wilkinson County, Mississippi in the early 19th century and had plantations there and in Hancock County. He served in the Mississippi State Senate in the 1820s.

== Biography ==
Joor was said to have been "a South Carolinian of Huguenot extraction and was an all-round, accomplished gentleman...He was a planter, legislator, director of the bank, wealthy, convivial, elegant, a fire-eater in politics."

Ioor married Eliza Richardson, daughter of Ann Magdalen Guignard and William Richardson of South Carolina. They lived near Stateburg, South Carolina, before relocating to the Natchez District, Mississippi Territory around 1810. Joor later wrote about staying with Indian agent Benjamin Hawkins that year and recalled some of their discussions of Indigenous oral tradition.

According to a descendant, the young family, including "their three small children—Peter Horry, George, and Ann Fley—moved to Mississippi Territory, taking with them a number of slaves. They were also accompanied by Mrs. Ioor's younger sister, Bethia Frances Richardson. At that time it was a long journey through the wilderness, over rough roads and dangerous streams, camping out at night and passing through many settlements of hostile Indian tribes who then inhabited the forest." Bethia Richardson married another local planter, Moses Liddell, and they had six children together before Bethia died in 1824; Eliza Richardson Joor took in the four surviving Liddell children and raised them in her household.

Along with George Poindexter, Daniel Williams, Abram M. Scott, Gerard C. Brandon, and Joseph Johnson, Joor represented Wilkinson county at the 1817 Mississippi constitutional convention.

In 1823 Joor was elected to the Mississippi state senate from Wilkinson County. In 1817 he was a trustee of Wilkinson Academy, a private log-cabin school for the sons of planters. In 1826 he was a partner in a turnpike road company planning a new land route in the vicinity of the Homochitto River. In 1831 he was on the board of the newly incorporated West Feliciana Railroad that had been planned to connect Bayou Sara and Woodville.

He also owned a plantation called Point Clear located east of Bayou Caddy in Hancock County, Mississippi near the Gulf of Mexico.

In September 1825 he dueled judge Joshua Child. According to a 20th-century account they dueled "on the edge of the village of Woodville, Mississippi, near which both participants lived. They were General John Joor, a close friend of General Andrew Jackson, under whom he had served as an officer in the Battle of New Orleans. General Joor had acquired two brass cannon captured in that battle, placing one in the Court House Square of Woodville and presenting the other to Natchez...The other participant was Joshua Child of Natchez...recognized for many years as the most learned jurist in the state but arbitrary, eccentric and not popular with the members of the bar...The agreement was to meet without seconds, armed as each pleased and to fight as each pleased. It is said Judge Child came to honor attended by a mulatto body servant with a wagon load of muskets and pistols. In the affair both men were severely wounded, but not mortally."

== Personal life ==
- His daughter Nancy Joor married William Haile.
