= Thomas Barnes (Mississippi politician) =

Mississippi politician

1st Speaker of the Mississippi House of Representatives

Member of the Mississippi House of Representatives
- In office October 6, 1817 – February 6, 1818
- Succeeded by: Edward Turner

Member of the Mississippi House of Representatives from the Claiborne County district
- In office October 6, 1817 – February 6, 1818 Serving with Henry G. Johnston

Thomas A. Barnes was a state legislator in Mississippi. He served as Speaker of the Mississippi House of Representatives during the first General Assembly held in Mississippi from October 6, 1817, to February 6, 1818. Barnes had previously been a member of the Legislative Council of the Mississippi Territory representing Clairborne County and was president of the council from 1809 to 1810, then again from 1812 to 1815. In 1815 he resigned due to bad health.

He lived in Port Gibson, Mississippi.

He was involved with negotiations over commerce on the Mississippi River and a proposal for election districting.
