= White Turpin =

American politician and plantation owner

White Turpin Sr. (June 2, 1777–April 4, 1842) was a plantation owner, sheriff, and state legislator in Mississippi. A prominent resident of Natchez, Mississippi, he served as the last territorial sheriff and the first sheriff of Adams County. He also served in the state legislature. His townhome is now a bed and breakfast at 608 Jefferson Street in Natchez. He served as president of the Agricultural Bank of Mississippi. The Greek Revival architecture bank building is part of the Natchez On-Top-of-the-Hill Historic District.

He was born in Delaware. He moved to Mississippi with his close friend David Holmes in 1809. He married divorcee Rebecca Pettit on August 3, 1813. He owned Oakland Plantation (burned in 1896). He had three sons, the eldest named after David Holmes. Six years after his wife died he married Lavinia Magruder, a widow, February 24, 1824. They had a daughter together named after his first wife. She organized the Natchez Temperance Society in 1828. He was a trustee of Jefferson College.

As a state senator he represented Adams County, Mississippi. In 1823 he was appointed escheator-general for the state. In 1830 he was appointed an Associate Justice for Adams County.

== See also ==
- 3rd Mississippi Legislature
- Joseph Dunbar (politician), executor of Turpin's estate, also married to a Magruder
