= John Hampden Randolph =

American planter and businessman (1813–1883)

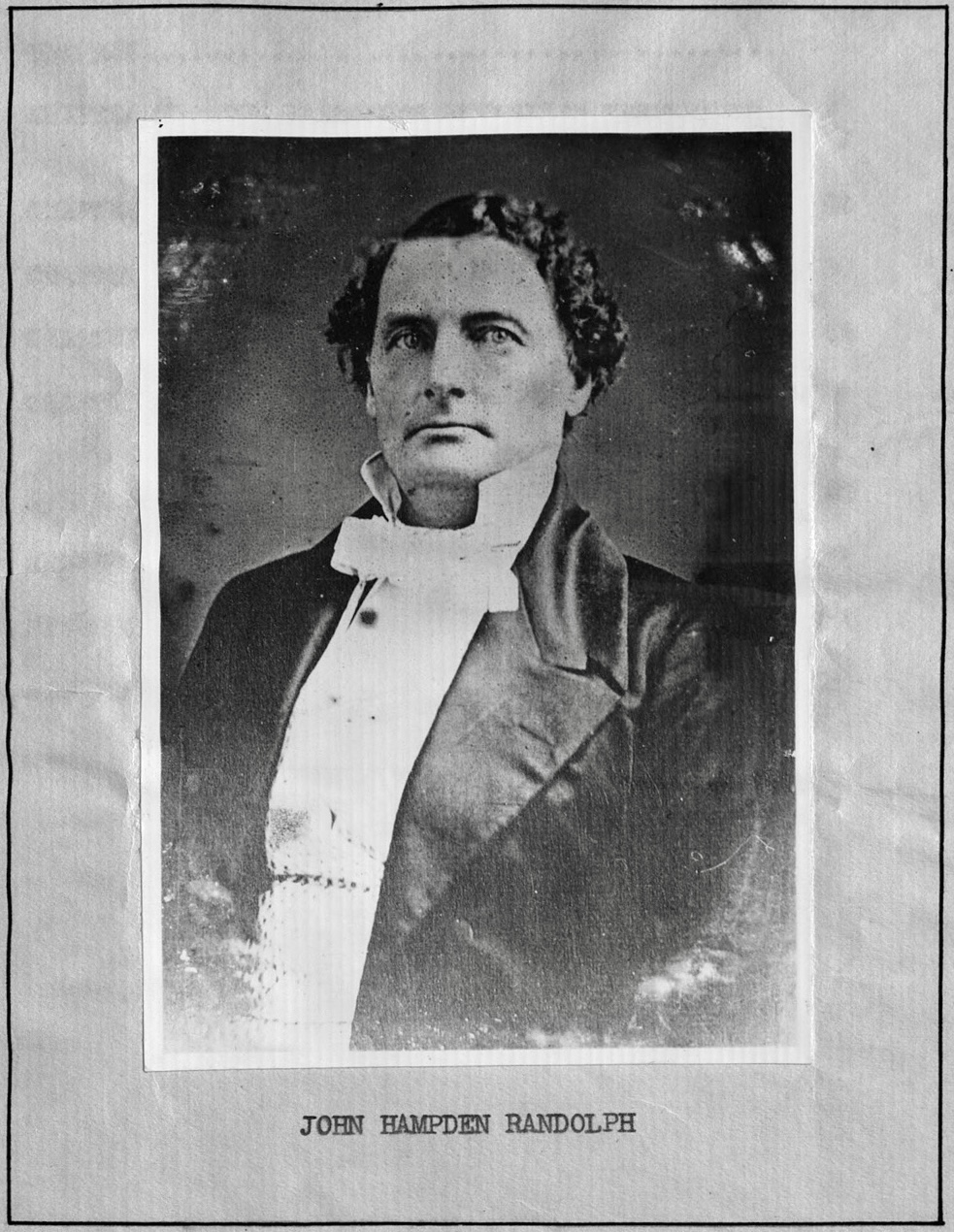
John Hampden Randolph

John Hampden Randolph (March 24, 1813 – September 1883) was an American planter and businessman. Born into a wealthy Virginia family, when his father was appointed to be a federal judge in the lower Mississippi River valley in 1823, Randolph moved with his parents to the then-remote Natchez District of the Mississippi Territory. Randolph may have worked as a slave trader to supplement his income as a cotton plantation owner. In the 1840s he moved across the Mississippi River to Louisiana where he entered the sugar business, eventually assembling an expensive sugar works and owning a large area of land in Iberville Parish. His four contiguous plantations were called Nottoway, Blythewood, Forest Home, and Bayou Goula. Most of the land was devoted to sugarcane cultivated by an enslaved labor force but the fields were interspersed with timberland and cypress swamp. Randolph became quite wealthy by the 1850s and commissioned a large, storybook mansion house at Nottoway. Three of his sons served in the Confederate States Army during the American Civil War, one of whom was killed at the Siege of Vicksburg. Randolph's fortunes contracted after the war and he began selling off his land holdings for debt service. After Randolph died in 1883 his heirs sold the plantation house. It passed through two families before it was sold to businesspeople who marketed it as an event venue offering a "plantation style" setting. The "big house" at Nottoway was destroyed in a catastrophic fire in May 2025.

== Biography ==
He was born in Lunenburg County, Virginia. Randolph moved to Mississippi when he was six. His father was U.S. District Court judge for the district of Mississippi Peter Randolph. They lived on a cotton plantation near Woodville, the county seat of Wilkinson County, in the old Natchez District. Little is known about his education except he studied for a time under Lucy Bakewell Audubon, who earned income to support the John James Audubon family by running an academy for the children of wealthy planters. In the 1830s Randolph seems to have had business interests in Madison Parish, Louisiana; a local historian wrote that "he must have been very active in selling and buying enslaved people as his name appears in a large number of the transactions" of the first parish record book.

Randolph married Emily Jane Liddell on December 14, 1818. She was the daughter of plantation owner, state legislator, and county judge Moses Liddell; one of her brothers, St. John Liddell, became a Confederate General, and her sister Bethia Liddell Richardson was eventually mother-in-law to U.S. Senator Donelson Caffery.

Originally a cotton plantation owner in Mississippi like his father, Randolph bought land in Iberville Parish in 1841 and moved to Louisiana. He converted to sugarcane production and invested in a sugar mill in the mid-1840s. Largely successful in this endeavor, he used the profits from the sale of sugar and molasses to travel widely, pay for eastern educations for four of his children, and buy more land and enslaved people. University archives hold at least six enslaved transaction receipts involving Randolph; he bought enslaved people from notable New Orleans traders including John Hagan, Theodore Johnston, Edward Lockett, Bernard Kendig, and Walter Campbell.

Beginning in 1856 he funded the construction of Nottaway plantation house. He relocated his enslaved people to Texas for two years during the civil war and then after the South lost the Civil War, the now freed slaves returned to work for him as free men. His son Algernon Sidney Randolph, a graduate of the University of Virginia and a second lieutenant in the 3rd Louisiana Infantry Regiment of the Confederate States Army, was killed in the rifle pits at the Battle of Vicksburg in May 1863. Two other sons also served in the Confederate States Army.

Randolph continued growing sugar and buying land until 1871, ultimately controlling about 7,000 acres, 3,000 of which was swamp, along with timber and agricultural land. The timber provided the fuel for the kettles used in processing sugar. He began selling off land to pay debts in the 1870s and owned only Nottoway and some of the swampland when he died in Louisiana in September 1883. In the late twentieth century, Nottoway was converted into a resort and wedding venue, with the mansion serving as a hotel and museum. On May 15, 2025 around 2pm it caught on fire and was mostly destroyed. Prior to this point it had only been owned by two families since construction. Nottoway was one of the largest antebellum homes in the South until its most recent fate.
