= 2nd Mississippi Legislature =

1819 legislative session

←	1st Mississippi Legislature	3rd Mississippi Legislature	→

Overview
- Legislative body: Mississippi Legislature
- Jurisdiction: Mississippi, USA
- Meeting place: Natchez, Mississippi
- Term: January 4, 1819 – February 1819

Mississippi State Senate
- President: Duncan Stewart

Mississippi House of Representatives
- Speaker: Edward Turner

The 2nd Mississippi Legislature first met on January 4, 1819, in Natchez, Mississippi. It adjourned in February 1819.

== Senate ==
The Mississippi State Senate was composed of the following members. Lieutenant Governor Duncan Stewart served ex officio as President of the Senate, and non-senator Spotswood Mills served as the Senate's secretary.

County District	Senator
Adams	Henry Postlethwaite
Amite	David Lea
Jefferson	Armstrong Ellis
Wilkinson	Joseph Johnson
Franklin, Pike	Richardson Bowman
Lawrence, Marion, Hancock	Howell W. Runnels
Warren, Claiborne	Henry D. Downs
Wayne, Greene, Jackson	Josiah Skinner

== Mississippi House of Representatives ==
The Mississippi House of Representatives was composed of the following. Edward Turner was elected Speaker of the House. Non-representatives Peter A. Vandorn and Henry Vaughan served as Clerk and Doorkeeper respectively.

County	Representative
Adams	Charles B. Green
Adams	Joseph Sessions
Adams	John B. Newitt
Adams	Edward Turner
Amite	Henry Hanna
Amite	John Burton
Amite	William Gardner
Claiborne	William Willis
Claiborne	Stephen D. Carson
Franklin	John Cameron
Green	Isaac R. Nicholson
Hancock	Noel Jourdon
Jackson	?
Jefferson	Roswell Valentine
Jefferson	James Calvin
Lawrence	Harmon Runnells
Marion	Jacob Tomlinson
Pike	Vincent Gardner
Pike	David Cleveland
Warren	Jacob Hyland
Wayne	William Patton
Wilkinson	Thomas M. Gildart
Wilkinson	Joshua Child
Wilkinson	John R. Holliday
