= Portrait of a Creole Woman with Madras Tignon =

C. 1837 portrait attributed to Charles Jean-Baptiste Colson

- Portrait of Marie Laveau (historically)
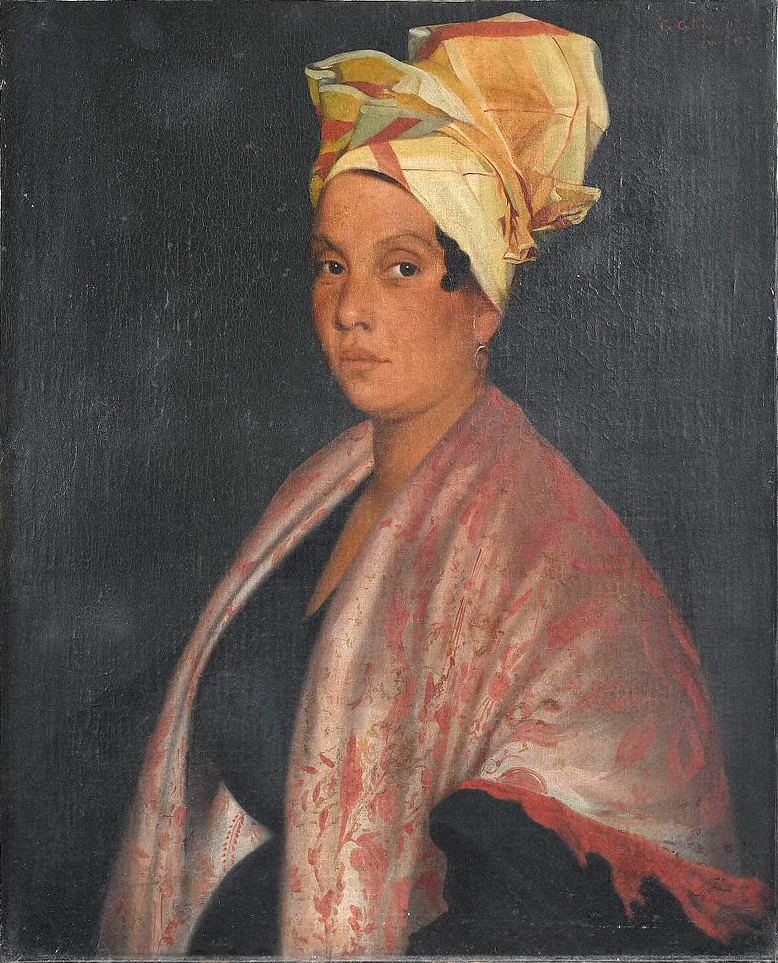
- Artist: Charles Jean-Baptiste Colson; George Catlin (attributed)
- Year: c. 1837
- Medium: oil on canvas
- Subject: Unknown Creole woman
- Dimensions: 53 cm × 60 cm (21 in × 23.5 in)
- Location: Virginia Museum of Fine Arts, Richmond, Virginia, U.S.
- Owner: Virginia Museum of Fine Arts

Portrait of a Creole Woman with Madras Tignon (c. 1837) is an oil painting traditionally attributed to George Catlin but now understood to have been painted by Charles Jean-Baptiste Colson. It is best known from a c. 1915 copy made by Frank Schneider, an art restorer working for the Louisiana State Museum. The portrait was historically known as Portrait of Marie Laveau as it was presumed to depict Louisiana Voodoo priestess Marie Laveau. Long thought to be lost, the painting resurfaced in 2022 when it was sold at auction for US$984,000.

The three-quarter painting shows an unknown free Creole of color woman wearing a multicolor tignon and a red shawl. It includes a signature at the upper right "G. Catlin Nlle Orléans / mai 1837". Despite the sitter being identified as Laveau, and Catlin having spent time in New Orleans during her lifetime, there are no records of him having met or painted her.

== History ==
The earliest records for the painting come from 1912 when the Board of Curators of the Louisiana State Museum reported on artwork loaned to the museum for exhibition at the Cabildo. Among the items loaned by New Orleans entrepreneur and collector Gaspar Cusachs, who contributed a number of paintings, artifacts, and curios to the new museum, was an oil painting recorded as "Portrait, Marie Laveau, by C. Catlin, 1833, 18×25" [sic].

In 1922, Maison Blanche co-owner Simon J. Shwartz acquired the painting, displaying it in a small gallery on the department store's fourth floor as "Marie Laveau by Catlin" until he sold the painting to Louisiana Historical Society president Edward Alexander Parsons in 1933. Parsons returned the painting to the Louisiana State Museum, but the identification of the portrait was less certain. The 1934 guide book for the museum identified the painting as "Marie Laveau or Choctaw Woman," and by 1941 the attribution to Catlin was also in dispute.

By 1947, the painting was no longer on display at the Cabildo, having been reclaimed by Parsons and eventually presumed lost until it appeared in May 2022 at Brunk Auctions in Asheville, North Carolina. Listed with an expected sale price of $200,000–300,000, the painting was purchased by the Virginia Museum of Fine Arts in Richmond, Virginia for $984,000.

=== Attribution ===
A report on the painting commissioned by the auction house investigated the history of the painting, but found no mention of the work in Catlin's records. In addition, the researcher noted that the painting and signature were both inconsistent with Catlin's style. While Catlin did travel along the Mississippi in the 1830s, his travel accounts do not directly mention Marie Laveau nor his painting any free women of color in New Orleans. Susan Rawles, an associate curator at the Virginia Museum of Fine Arts, noted that the portrait is reflective of French academic styles, and pointed to research indicating it should be attributed to Jacques Amans due to consistencies with his style, as well as the technique and materials he was known to use. After further investigation, the museum identified Charles Jean-Baptiste Colson, a Beaux-Arts de Paris-trained painter who spent the winter of 1837 making portraits in New Orleans, as the painter.

As for the painting's subject, the auction house's report noted that multiple portraits of unidentified Creole women wearing a tignon have been labeled as portraits of Marie Laveau. For example, François Fleischbein's Portrait of a Free Woman of Color (c. 1837) and Adolph Rinck's Free Woman of Color, New Orleans (1844) have both been identified as portraits of Marie Laveau at different points in time. According to her daughter, however, Laveau's image was never recorded during her lifetime. Responding to George Washington Cable's "Creole Slave Songs" article from The Century Magazine, which included an illustration of Laveau and her daughter Marie Philomène Glapion Legendre by E. W. Kemble, Legendre told a reporter from The Daily Picayune that Laveau "never had any [photograph] taken nor ever been sketched."

== Schneider copy ==
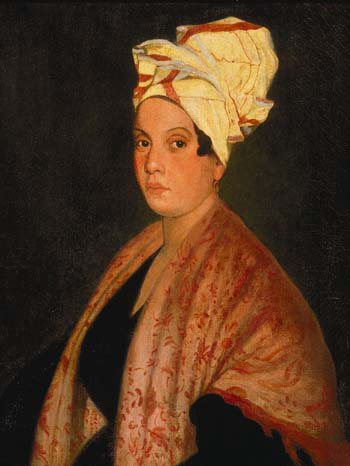
Copy painted c. 1915 by Frank Schneider

Sometime around 1915, while the original painting was on loan to the Louisiana State Museum, museum employee Frank Schneider (1881–1935) painted a copy of it. Schneider joined the staff of the Louisiana State Museum as curator of the art collection (as well as the museum's taxidermist) around 1914 and he restored and copied a number of paintings loaned to the museum.

Once the original was no longer available, Schneider's copy, identified as "Portrait of Marie Laveau" continued to be displayed in the museum. In 1988, when a fire swept through the Cabildo, the painting suffered some damage that required restoration work.

With the original painting lost for over 80 years, Schneider's copy became one of the most widely known paintings allegedly depicting Marie Laveau; folklorist Zora Neale Hurston specifically mentions the portrait in her 1931 essay "Hoodoo in America". The Schneider copy has been used as the inspiration for some modern reimaginations of Marie Laveau.
