= Malvina Latour =

Religious leader, voodoo spiritualism

Malvina Latour (fl. 1884) was an American Voodoo practitioner and disciple of Marie Laveau in New Orleans.

== Personal life ==
An eyewitness account claimed Latour looked about 48 years old in 1884. She was said to have been born enslaved, having worked as a house slave until her emancipation. There is no record of Latour in "New Orleans city directories, municipal and archdiocesan records or the census".

== Voodoo ==
Latour was a disciple of Voodoo practitioner Marie Laveau. After Laveau's death in 1881, Latour was one of several women variously reported to be Laveau's successor. In Herbert Asbury's 1936 book The French Quarter, Asbury describes Latour and indicates she was about thirty years old when she was named as Laveau's successor. Asbury goes on to describe her time as head of Voodooism in New Orleans, and Latour's retirement around 1890.

An account of the St. John's Eve ritual from 1884 describes people from the community gathering in a large crowd, speckled with hundreds of fires, bringing along musical instruments, coffee, and gumbo to share. Latour oversaw the ceremony as men and women danced bamboulas and other forms of ecstatic dancing, while others would play drums, guitars, banjos, and fiddles. George Washington Cable described Latour's appearance in his 1886 article in The Century Magazine on Creole slave songs.

== Conflation with other individuals ==
Carolyn Long's research indicates that Latour's identity was confused with "an earlier priestess known as Madame Lott", and that the two were "creatively combined" by Asbury in The French Quarter (1936). Louisiana Writers' Project writer Catherine Dillon has also noted that Latour has been confused with Marie Laveau's daughter.

The author Robert Tallant includes Malvina Latour in his book on Marie Laveau; Tallant notes in his introduction that his characters were real people, but that his work was a novel. Tallant also includes Latour in his non-fiction account of voodooism in New Orleans.
