= Prentiss Ingraham =

American novelist

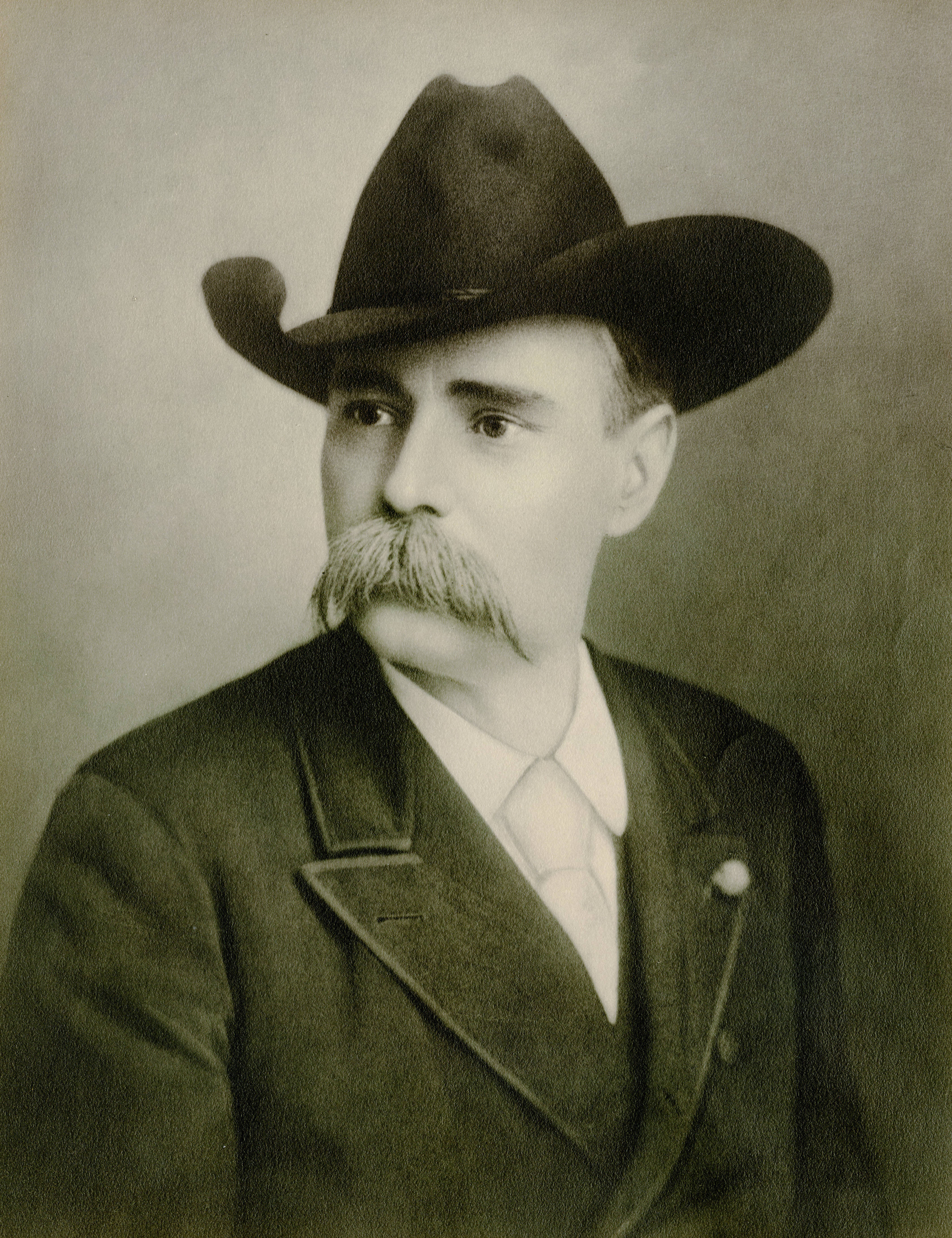
Prentiss Ingraham in 1890

Colonel Prentiss Ingraham (December 28, 1843 – August 16, 1904) was a colonel in the Confederate Army, a mercenary throughout the 1860s, and a fiction writer.

== Biography ==
Prentiss Ingraham, the son of Rev. Joseph Ingraham (author of A Prince of the House of David), was born near Natchez, Mississippi in Adams County. He studied at St. Timothy's Military Academy, Maryland, and at Jefferson College, Mississippi.

Later he entered the Mobile Medical College, but soon quit to join the Confederate Army where he became a Colonel in the Adacus Company Regiment. He was also commander of scouts in Lawrence Sullivan Ross' Brigade, the Texas Cavalry. After the end of the war, he went to Mexico and fought with Juárez against the French, and still later went to South America.

He had service with General Max Hoffmann's staff in the Battle of Sadowa, Austria, in 1866 was fighting for Greeks in Crete against the Turks during the Great Cretan Revolution, and in the Khedive's army in Egypt. During 1869 he went to London but soon came back to the United States and enlisted with the Cuban rebels against Spain, running the blockade in the Hornet several times before it was surrendered to the U. S. Navy. He was a Colonel in the Cuban army as well as a Captain in their navy, and was captured, tried as a filibuster and condemned to death by the Spaniards, but escaped. Ingraham relocated to the American West where he met Buffalo Bill Cody. Ingraham soon worked as an advance agent for Buffalo Bill's Wild West Show.

In 1875 he married Rose Langley.

== Writing career ==
Ingraham's literary career began in London in 1869. He was the author of the novel The Masked Spy (1872) and is known best for his Buffalo Bill series of novels. Other major novelistic series include the Buck Taylor series, Merle Monte series, and Dick Doom series. Ingraham claimed in 1900 to have written more than 600 novels.

As well as writing by his own name, Ingraham used a number of pseudonyms including: Dr. Noel Dunbar, Dangerfield Burr, Major Henry B. Stoddard, Colonel Leon Lafitte, Frank Powell, Harry Dennies Perry, Midshipman Tom W. Hall, Lieut. Preston Graham. He also ghostwrote several works for Buffalo Bill Cody.

=== Buffalo Bill dime novels by Col. Prestiss Ingraham ===
- 1 Buffalo Bill, the Border King
- 2 Buffalo Bill’s Raid
- 3 Buffalo Bill’s Bravery
- 4 Buffalo Bill’s Trump Card
- 5 Buffalo Bill’s Pledge
- 6 Buffalo Bill’s Vengeance
- 7 Buffalo Bill’s Iron Grip
- 8 Buffalo Bill’s Capture
- 9 Buffalo Bill’s Danger Line
- 10 Buffalo Bill’s Comrades
- 11 Buffalo Bill’s Reckoning
- 12 Buffalo Bill’s Warning
- 13 Buffalo Bill at Bay
- 14 Buffalo Bill’s Buckskin Pards
- 15 Buffalo Bill’s Brand
- 16 Buffalo Bill’s Honor
- 17 Buffalo Bill’s Phantom Hunt
- 18 Buffalo Bill’s Fight With Fire
- 19 Buffalo Bill’s Danite Trail
- 20 Buffalo Bill’s Ranch Riders
- 21 Buffalo Bill’s Death Trail
- 22 Buffalo Bill’s Trackers
- 23 Buffalo Bill’s Mid-air Flight
- 24 Buffalo Bill, Ambassador
- 25 Buffalo Bill’s Air Voyage
- 26 Buffalo Bill’s Secret Mission
- 27 Buffalo Bill’s Long Trail
- 28 Buffalo Bill Against Odds
- 29 Buffalo Bill’s Hot Chase
- 30 Buffalo Bill’s Redskin Ally
- 31 Buffalo Bill’s Treasure Trove
- 32 Buffalo Bill’s Hidden Foes
- 33 Buffalo Bill’s Crack Shot
- 34 Buffalo Bill’s Close Call
- 35 Buffalo Bill’s Double Surprise
- 36 Buffalo Bill’s Ambush
- 37 Buffalo Bill’s Outlaw Hunt
- 38 Buffalo Bill’s Border Duel
- 39 Buffalo Bill’s Bid for Fame
- 40 Buffalo Bill’s Triumph
- 41 Buffalo Bill’s Spy Trailer
- 42 Buffalo Bill’s Death Call
- 43 Buffalo Bill’s Body Guard
- 44 Buffalo Bill’s Still Hunt
- 45 Buffalo Bill and the Doomed Dozen
- 46 Buffalo Bill’s Prairie Scout
- 47 Buffalo Bill’s Traitor Guide
- 48 Buffalo Bill’s Bonanza
- 49 Buffalo Bill’s Swoop
- 50 Buffalo Bill and the Gold King
- 51 Buffalo Bill, Deadshot
- 52 Buffalo Bill’s Buckskin Bravos
- 53 Buffalo Bill’s Big Four
- 54 Buffalo Bill’s One-armed Pard
- 55 Buffalo Bill’s Race for Life
- 56 Buffalo Bill’s Return
- 57 Buffalo Bill’s Conquest
- 58 Buffalo Bill to the Rescue
- 59 Buffalo Bill’s Beautiful Foe
- 60 Buffalo Bill’s Perilous Task
- 61 Buffalo Bill’s Queer Find
- 62 Buffalo Bill’s Blind Lead
- 63 Buffalo Bill’s Resolution
- 64 Buffalo Bill, the Avenger
- 65 Buffalo Bill’s Pledged Pard
- 66 Buffalo Bill’s Weird Warning
- 67 Buffalo Bill’s Wild Ride
- 68 Buffalo Bill’s Redskin Stampede
- 69 Buffalo Bill’s Mine Mystery
- 70 Buffalo Bill’s Gold Hunt
- 71 Buffalo Bill’s Daring Dash
- 72 Buffalo Bill on Hand
- 73 Buffalo Bill’s Alliance
- 74 Buffalo Bill’s Relentless Foe
- 75 Buffalo Bill’s Midnight Ride
- 76 Buffalo Bill’s Chivalry
- 77 Buffalo Bill’s Girl Pard
- 78 Buffalo Bill’s Private War
- 79 Buffalo Bill’s Diamond Mine
- 80 Buffalo Bill’s Big Contract
- 81 Buffalo Bill’s Woman Foe
- 82 Buffalo Bill’s Ruse
- 83 Buffalo Bill’s Pursuit
- 84 Buffalo Bill’s Hidden Gold
- 85 Buffalo Bill in Mid-air
- 86 Buffalo Bill’s Queer Mission
- 87 Buffalo Bill’s Verdict
- 88 Buffalo Bill’s Ordeal
- 89 Buffalo Bill’s Camp Fires
- 90 Buffalo Bill’s Iron Nerve
- 91 Buffalo Bill’s Rival
- 92 Buffalo Bill’s Lone Hand
- 93 Buffalo Bill’s Sacrifice
- 94 Buffalo Bill’s Thunderbolt
- 95 Buffalo Bill’s Black Fortune
- 96 Buffalo Bill’s Wild Work
- 97 Buffalo Bill’s Yellow Trail
- 98 Buffalo Bill’s Treasure Train
- 99 Buffalo Bill’s Bowie Duel
- 100 Buffalo Bill’s Mystery Man
- 101 Buffalo Bill’s Bold Play
- 102 Buffalo Bill: Peacemaker
- 103 Buffalo Bill’s Big Surprise
- 104 Buffalo Bill’s Barricade
- 105 Buffalo Bill’s Test
- 106 Buffalo Bill’s Powwow
- 107 Buffalo Bill’s Stern Justice
- 108 Buffalo Bill’s Mysterious Friend
- 109 Buffalo Bill and the Boomers
- 110 Buffalo Bill’s Panther Fight
- 111 Buffalo Bill and the Overland Mail
- 112 Buffalo Bill on the Deadwood Trail
- 113 Buffalo Bill in Apache Land
- 114 Buffalo Bill’s Blindfold Duel
- 115 Buffalo Bill and the Lone Camper
- 116 Buffalo Bill’s Merry War
- 117 Buffalo Bill’s Star Play
- 118 Buffalo Bill’s War Cry
- 119 Buffalo Bill on Black Panther’s Trail
- 120 Buffalo Bill’s Slim Chance
- 121 Buffalo Bill Besieged
- 122 Buffalo Bill’s Bandit Round-up
- 123 Buffalo Bill’s Surprise Party
- 124 Buffalo Bill’s Lightning Raid
- 125 Buffalo Bill in Mexico
- 126 Buffalo Bill’s Traitor Foe
- 127 Buffalo Bill’s Tireless Chase
- 128 Buffalo Bill’s Boy Bugler
- 129 Buffalo Bill’s Sure Guess
- 130 Buffalo Bill’s Record Jump
- 131 Buffalo Bill in the Land of Dread
- 132 Buffalo Bill’s Tangled Clue
- 133 Buffalo Bill’s Wolf Skin
- 134 Buffalo Bill’s Twice Four Puzzle
- 135 Buffalo Bill and the Devil Bird
- 136 Buffalo Bill and the Indian’s Mascot
- 137 Buffalo Bill Entrapped
- 138 Buffalo Bill’s Totem Trail
- 139 Buffalo Bill at Fort Challis
- 140 Buffalo Bill’s Determination
- 141 Buffalo Bill’s Battle Axe
- 142 Buffalo Bill’s Game with Fate
- 143 Buffalo Bill’s Comanche Raid
- 144 Buffalo Bill’s Aerial Island
- 145 Buffalo Bill’s Lucky Shot
- 146 Buffalo Bill’s Sioux Friends
- 147 Buffalo Bill’s Supreme Test
- 148 Buffalo Bill’s Boldest Strike
- 149 Buffalo Bill and the Red Hand
- 150 Buffalo Bill’s Dance with Death
- 151 Buffalo Bill’s Running Fight
- 152 Buffalo Bill in Harness
- 153 Buffalo Bill Corralled
- 154 Buffalo Bill’s Waif of the West

== Death ==
Prentiss Ingraham spent his final days at the Beauvoir Confederate Home in Biloxi, Mississippi where he died of Bright's Disease, known to modern medicine as nephritis, on August 16, 1904, aged 60.
