= Redhibition =

Civil action in Louisiana law

Redhibition is a civil action available under Louisiana law against the seller and/or manufacturer of a defective product, similar to the lemon laws more familiar to common law jurisdictions in other U.S. states. Redhibition is one of many laws that are unique to Louisiana among U.S. states because of its tradition in French and Spanish civil law.

== Overview ==
In a redhibitory action, the buyer demands a full refund or a reduction in the purchase price because the product has a hidden defect (redhibitory defect) that prevents it from performing the task for which it was purchased. Most consumer products carry an implied warranty of merchantability. If a product is so substantially defective that the buyer would not have bought it in the first place had they known of its defects, there may be grounds for filing such a suit. It does however differ from lemon laws in a very significant way. Namely, that it applies to any product sold new or used, including real estate, whereas lemon laws typically only apply to new automobiles. In fact, Louisiana does also have a separate lemon law of its own, which like others applies exclusively to automobiles.

== Conditions that must be met before a redhibition suit can be filed ==
1. The action is available only after the buyer has given the seller a reasonable opportunity to repair the defective product.
2. The defect in the product must be hidden, that is, not apparent at the time of the sale. The defect must have existed at the time of the sale. The law presumes that if a defect is noticed within three days of purchase, it existed at the time of sale.
3. If a defect becomes obvious more than three days after purchase, the responsibility for proving that it existed at the time of the sale rests with the buyer.
4. The suit must be instituted within one year from the date of sale of the defective products, except where a pet store is involved, in which case the action must be taken within 60 days of purchase.
5. If the seller has attempted to repair the defective product and failed, the action must be instituted within one year of the date of the last attempt to correct the defect.
6. If the seller knew of the defect at the time of sale but sold the product anyway, the action is available for one year from the date the buyer discovered the defect.

== Rights of the buyer under redhibition ==
If the buyer can prove that the seller knew of the existence of the defect in the product but sold it anyway, he may be entitled not only to return of the purchase price, but to replacement of any expenses caused by the sale, reasonable attorney fees and damage resulting from use of the defective product. Even if the seller did not know of the defect at the time of sale, the buyer may sue for return of the purchase price and certain other expenses incurred as a result of the sale. The buyer may seek the same awards from the manufacturer as from the seller because, legally the manufacturer is presumed to know of the existence of defects in his products. It need not be proven.

When all is said and done, whether the seller knew of the defect or not, the judge has the option of awarding the buyer an amount less than the purchase price but appropriate to the seriousness of the defect. The judge may also deduct for any satisfactory service the buyer derived from the product before or in spite of the defect. Today, many sellers require buyers to sign a waiver of warranty at the time of purchase. Such a waiver may or may not affect the buyer's right to file an action in redhibition. The buyer may also have rights under the federal Magnuson-Moss Warranty Act.
