= Marie Laveau =

American Voodoo practitioner (1801–1881)

- Marie Laveaux
- Born: Marie Catherine Laveau; September 10, 1801; New Orleans, Louisiana (Note: At the time of Laveau's birth, New Orleans was under Spanish administration, but the territory had been formally restored to the French First Republic as part of the Third Treaty of San Ildefonso (1800) and the Treaty of Aranjuez (1801).)
- Died: June 15, 1881 (aged 79); New Orleans, Louisiana, U.S.
- Resting place: Saint Louis Cemetery No. 1
- Occupations: Occultist, voodoo priestess, midwife, nurse, herbalist
- Spouse: Jacques Paris (m. 1819; died 1823)
- Partner: Christophe Glapion (died 1855)
- Parents: Charles Laveau (father); Marguerite Henry (known as D'Arcantel) (mother)

Marie Catherine Laveau (September 10, 1801 – June 15, 1881) (Note: While popular sources often give Laveau's year of birth as 1794, records indicate she was born in 1801.) was a Louisiana Creole practitioner of Voodoo, a herbalist, and a midwife who was renowned in New Orleans. Her daughter, Marie Laveau II (1827 – c. 1862), also practiced rootwork, conjure, and Native American and African spiritualism, as well as Louisiana Voodoo and traditional Roman Catholicism. An alternate spelling of her name, Laveaux, is considered by historians to be from the original French spelling.

== Early life ==
Historical records state that Marie Catherine Laveau was born a free woman of color in New Orleans's French Quarter, Louisiana, on Thursday, September 10, 1801. At the time of her birth, Louisiana was still administered by Spanish colonial officials, although by treaty, the territory had been restored to the French First Republic a year prior. Her mother, Marguerite D'Arcantel, was a free woman of African, European, and Native American ancestry. Because Laveau's mother was not married at the time of her birth, her father was not identified on her 1801 baptismal record. A possible candidate is Charles Laveau, the son of Charles Laveau Trudeau, a white Louisiana creole and politician. Other historians claim that Laveau's father was a free man of color named Charles Laveaux. Much of the confusion is due to inconsistent spellings in surviving records.

On August 4, 1819, she married Jacques Paris (also known as Santiago Paris in Spanish records), a free man of color who was among the thousands of émigrés from Saint-Domingue to New Orleans in the wake of the Haitian Revolution. Their marriage certificate is preserved in the Saint Louis Cathedral in New Orleans. The nuptial mass was officiated by Antonio de Sedella, OFMCap. The couple had two daughters, Félicité (b. 1817) and Angèle (b. 1822), who are presumed to have died in childhood. Paris worked as a carpenter in New Orleans until 1822, after which he disappears from city records. He is believed to have died in Baton Rouge in 1823. On Félicité's 1824 baptismal certificate, Laveau is referred to as "the Widow Paris".

== Personal life ==
Following the reported death of her husband, Jacques Paris, she entered a domestic partnership with Christophe Dominick Duminy de Glapion, a nobleman of French descent, with whom she lived until his death in 1855. They were reported to have had 15 children (whether that includes children and grandchildren is unclear). They had seven children according to birth and baptismal records: François-Auguste Glapion, Marie-Louise "Caroline" Glapion, Marie-Angélie Paris, Célestin Albert Glapion, Arcange Glapion, Félicité Paris, Marie-Philomène Glapion, and Marie-Héloïse Eucharist Glapion. Only Marie-Héloïse and Marie-Philomène survived into adulthood.

Marie Laveau is confirmed to have owned at least seven slaves during her lifetime. During her life, Marie Laveau was known to have attended to prisoners who were sentenced to death. Rumors circulated that some prisoners would receive poisons or other substances before going to the gallows, but this was never proven. A reporter from the New Orleans Republican detailed one such visit in an article published on May 14, 1871, in which he describes Marie Laveau as a “devout and acceptable member of the Catholic communion." Following her death, her daughter Philomène confirmed during an interview with a reporter from the Picayune that only Catholic traditions would take place during these visits, and that her mother would also prepare the men's last meal and pray with them. Marie Laveau also sought pardons or commutations of sentences for those she favored, and was often successful in her efforts.

She was known to care for the sick in her community during the yellow fever epidemic of 1878 by providing herbal remedies and prayers for the afflicted. Her other community activities included visiting prisoners, providing lessons to the women of the community, and doing rituals for those in need without charge.

== Career ==
Marie Laveau was a dedicated practitioner of Voodoo, a healer, a herbalist, and an entrepreneur. Laveau was also known as a prominent female religious leader and community activist.

Laveau started a beauty parlor, where she was a hair dresser for the wealthier families of New Orleans. She excelled at obtaining inside information on her wealthy patrons at the beauty parlor by listening to ladies gossiping, or from their servants whom she either paid or cured of mysterious ailments. She used this information during her Voodoo consultations with wealthy Orleanian women to enhance her image as a clairvoyant, and used this intelligence to give them practical advice. She also made money by selling her clients gris gris as charms to help their wishes come true. Robert Tallant, a writer for the 1930s Federal Writes Project, reported that Laveau taught enslaved people how to use gris-gris against their masters.

In her role as a Voodoo practitioner, customers often appealed to Laveau for help with family disputes, health, finances, and more. Laveau performed her services in three main places - her own home on St. Ann Street, within Congo Square, and at Lake Pontchartrain. She was the third female leader of Voodoo in New Orleans (the first was Sanité Dédé, who ruled for a few years before being usurped by Marie Saloppé), a New Orleans voodoo "queen", or priestess. Marie Laveau maintained her authority throughout her leadership, although an attempt to challenge her was made in 1850. Due to her strong influence, New Orleans Voodoo lost a large number of adherents after her death. Her daughter, Marie Laveau II, displayed more theatrical rubrics by holding public events (including inviting attendees to St. John's Eve rituals on Bayou St. John).

Of Laveau's magical career, little can be substantiated, including whether or not she had a snake she named Zombi after an African god, whether the occult part of her magic mixed Roman Catholic saints with African spirits, and Native American spiritualism.

== Death ==
Plaque at the grave of Louisiana Voodoo Queen, Marie Laveau

Marie Catherine Laveau Paris Glapion died on June 15, 1881 (aged 79). The different spellings of her surname result from many different women with the same name in New Orleans at the time, and her age at death from conflicting accounts of her birth date.

On June 17, 1881, the Daily Picayune announced that Marie Laveau had died peacefully in her home. According to the Louisiana Writer's Project, her funeral was lavish and attended by a diverse audience including members of the white elite. Oral tradition states that she was seen by some people in town after her supposed demise. News of her death was featured in a number of newspapers, including the Staunton Spectator in Virginia, the Omaha Daily Bee in Nebraska, and several newspapers published in Minnesota.

At least two of her daughters were named Marie, following the French Catholic tradition to have the first names of daughters be Marie, and boys Joseph, then each use middle name as the common name. One of her daughters named Marie possibly assumed her position, with her name, and carried on her magical practice, taking over as the queen soon before or after the first Marie's death. Malvina Latour has also been reported as being Laveau's successor.

== Legacy ==
Laveau's name and history has been surrounded by legend and lore. She is generally believed to have been buried in plot 347, at the Glapion family crypt in Saint Louis Cemetery No. 1, New Orleans, but this fact has been disputed by author and journalist Robert Tallant. Tourists continue to visit her tomb following a decades-old belief in which those seeking a wish from Laveau would draw three Xs on the surface, turn around three times, knock on the tomb, and then call out their wish. Those whose wishes were granted were expected to return, circle the Xs, and leave an offering.

Laveau and her work is discussed at length in the 1935 book Mules and Men by Zora Neale Hurston who interviewed and studied under hoodoo doctor Luke Turner, who identified himself as the Laveau's grandnephew. Hurston relates Turner's personal reminiscences of Laveau and describes some of the incantations and rituals he reported learning under her tutelage.

In 1982, New Jersey–based punk rock group The Misfits were arrested and accused of attempting to exhume Laveau from her grave after a local concert. The arrest took place in nearby Cemetery No. 2 and accounts of the incident are in conflict.

The tomb in Saint Louis Cemetery No. 1 was vandalized by an unknown person on December 17, 2013, by being painted over with pink latex paint. The paint was removed because the structure is made of old plaster and the latex paint would seal in the moisture that would destroy the plaster. Some historical preservation experts criticized officials of the Archdiocese of New Orleans, which maintains the cemetery, for its decision to use pressure washing rather than paint stripper to remove it. After the cleaning, the archdiocese and local nonprofit Save Our Cemeteries collaborated over three months in 2014 to restore the tomb. The project removed crumbling plaster, rebuilt the roof, and added several coats of new plaster and lime wash. During the restorations, however, the project was plagued by tomb visitors scratching X marks into the new plaster.

As of March 1, 2015, access to St. Louis Cemetery No. 1 is no longer public. Entry with a tour guide is required because of continued vandalism and the destruction of tombs. This change was made by the Archdiocese of New Orleans to protect the tombs of the Laveau family, as well as those of the many other dead interred there.

Although some references to Marie Laveau in popular culture refer to her as a "witch", she has also been called a "Voudou Priestess", and she is frequently described as a Voodoo queen. At the time of her death, The New York Times, The New Orleans Daily Picayune, the Daily States, and other news sources describe her as "woman of great beauty, intellect, and charisma who was also pious, charitable, and a skilled herbal healer."

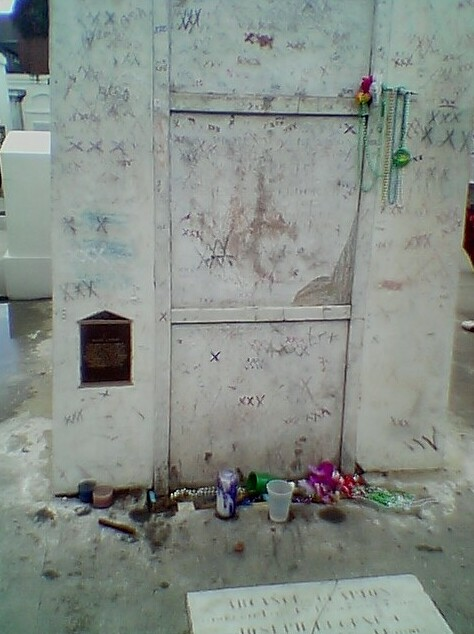
The mausoleum where Marie Laveau is said to be interred, in Saint Louis Cemetery No. 1

== Artistic legacy and in popular culture ==
Due to her prominence within the history of Voodoo in New Orleans, Laveau has inspired a number of artistic renditions. In visual art, African-American artist Renee Stout often uses Laveau as a visual motif.

Despite never being photographed or having sat for a painter, several 19th-century paintings of unidentified Creole women have been labeled as a portrait of Marie Laveau. By the 1940s, any portrait of an unidentified woman of color wearing a tignon commonly was identified as a portrait of Laveau. A copy made around 1915 of Portrait of a Creole Woman with Madras Tignon (c. 1837, attributed to George Catlin) in the collection of the Louisiana State Museum, was long labeled as a Portrait of Marie Laveau.

Numerous songs about Marie Laveau have been recorded, including "Marie La Veau" by Papa Celestin; "Marie Laveau" written by Shel Silverstein and Baxter Taylor and recorded by Dr. Hook & the Medicine Show (1972), and Bobby Bare (1974); "The Witch Queen of New Orleans" (1971) by Redbone; "Dixie Drug Store" by Grant Lee Buffalo; "X Marks the Spot (Marie Laveau)" by Joe Sample; "Marie Laveau" by Dr. John; "Marie Laveau" (2013) by Tao Of Sound; "Voodoo Queen Marie" to the minstrel tune "Colored Aristocracy" by The Holy Modal Rounders; "The Witch Queen of New Orleans" by Total Toly; "The Widow Paris" by The Get Up Kids; "Marie Laveau" by the Danish metal band Volbeat; and "The Widow Paris" by Lester T. Raww's Graveside Quartet.

Laveau is mentioned in the songs "I Will Play for Gumbo" (1999) by Jimmy Buffett, "Clare" by Fairground Attraction, and "Rabbit's Foot" by Turbowolf. Two of Laveau's nephews, banjo player Raymond Glapion and bassist Alcide "Slow Drag" Pavageau, became prominent New Orleans jazz musicians. Los Angeles blues band Canned Heat featured a five-minute instrumental called "Marie Laveau" on their second album Boogie With Canned Heat (1968), written by and featuring their lead guitarist Henry Vestine.

A musical from 1999, Marie Christine, is also based on the life of Laveau.

Laveau has offered inspiration for a number of fictional characters, as well. She is the protagonist of such novels as Robert Tallant's The Voodoo Queen (1956), Francine Prose's Marie Laveau (1977), and Jewell Parker Rhodes' Voodoo Dreams: A Novel of Marie Laveau (1993). Laveau appears as a supporting character in the Night Huntress novels by Jeaniene Frost as a powerful ghoul still living in New Orleans in the 21st century. She also appears as a background character in Barbara Hambly's Benjamin January mystery series, set in New Orleans. Marie Laveau appears in Neil Gaiman's novel American Gods, under her married name, Marie Paris. Marie Laveau's tomb is the site of a secret, fictional underground Voodoo workshop in the Caster Chronicles novel Beautiful Chaos by Kami Garcia and Margaret Stohl. Laveau's gravesite is the setting of a pivotal scene in Robert J. Randisi's short story, "Cold as the Gun", from Foreshadows the Ghosts of Zero. The mother of Hazel Levesque, one of the characters from Rick Riordan's The Heroes of Olympus book series, was known as "Queen Marie", a famous fortune-teller who lived in New Orleans. In Charlaine Harris's True Blood (Sookie Stackhouse novels) book series, the character Hadley is lured to her death at the site of Marie Laveau's tomb.

A character named Marie Laveau, based loosely on the real Marie Laveau, appears in Marvel Comics. She first appeared in Dracula Lives #2 in 1973. She is depicted as a powerful sorceress and Voodoo priestess with great magical powers and knowledge of arcane lore, including the creation of a potion that should keep her eternally youthful (the potion required the blood of a vampire). A character named Marie Laveau also appears in the Italian comic book Zagor.

In television, a heavily fictionalized Marie Laveau (portrayed by Angela Bassett) appears as a character in American Horror Story: Coven, American Horror Story: Apocalypse, and American Horror Story: 13.

She appears in the Canadian television series Lost Girl (portrayed by Marci T. House) in episode 11 of season four, Young Sheldon (portrayed by Sharon Ferguson) in episode seven of season one, and Legends of Tomorrow (portrayed by Joyce Guy) in episode seven of season four.

== Depiction ==
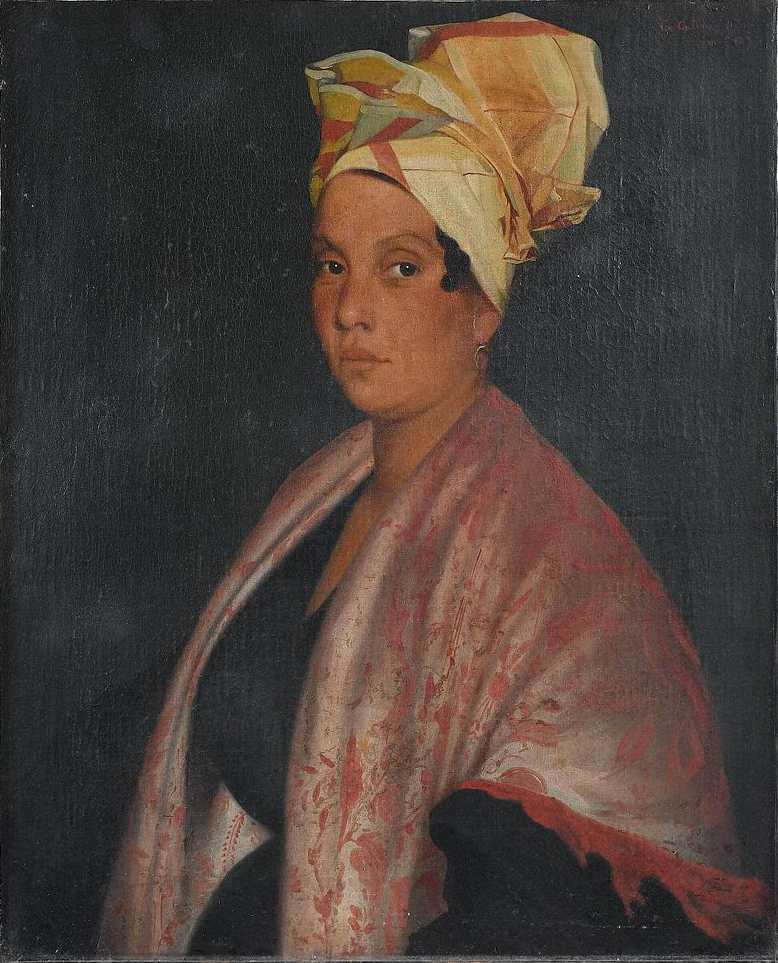
Portrait of a Creole Woman with Madras Tignon

There are no verified contemporary portraits, photographs, or drawings of Marie Laveau. According to a later 19th-century account attributed to a reporter for The Daily Picayune, her daughter stated that Laveau "never had any [photograph] taken nor ever been sketched." Historians generally regard this as consistent with the absence of any authenticated visual record from her lifetime.

Despite this, several 19th-century portraits of free women of color in New Orleans have been repeatedly identified in later tradition as depictions of Laveau. These identifications are not supported by primary documentation or provenance linking any surviving image directly to her and are generally considered retrospective attributions that emerged after her death. Scholars typically interpret such works as genre portraits representing free women of color in antebellum New Orleans rather than specific individuals.

No contemporary source has been identified that links any surviving portrait to Laveau. The three most widely circulated portraits associated with her are listed below. Other 19th-century portraits of free women of color have also occasionally been proposed as depictions of Laveau. These identifications are generally speculative and have received little scholarly support.

=== Charles Colson, Portrait of a Creole Woman with Madras Tignon (c. 1837) ===
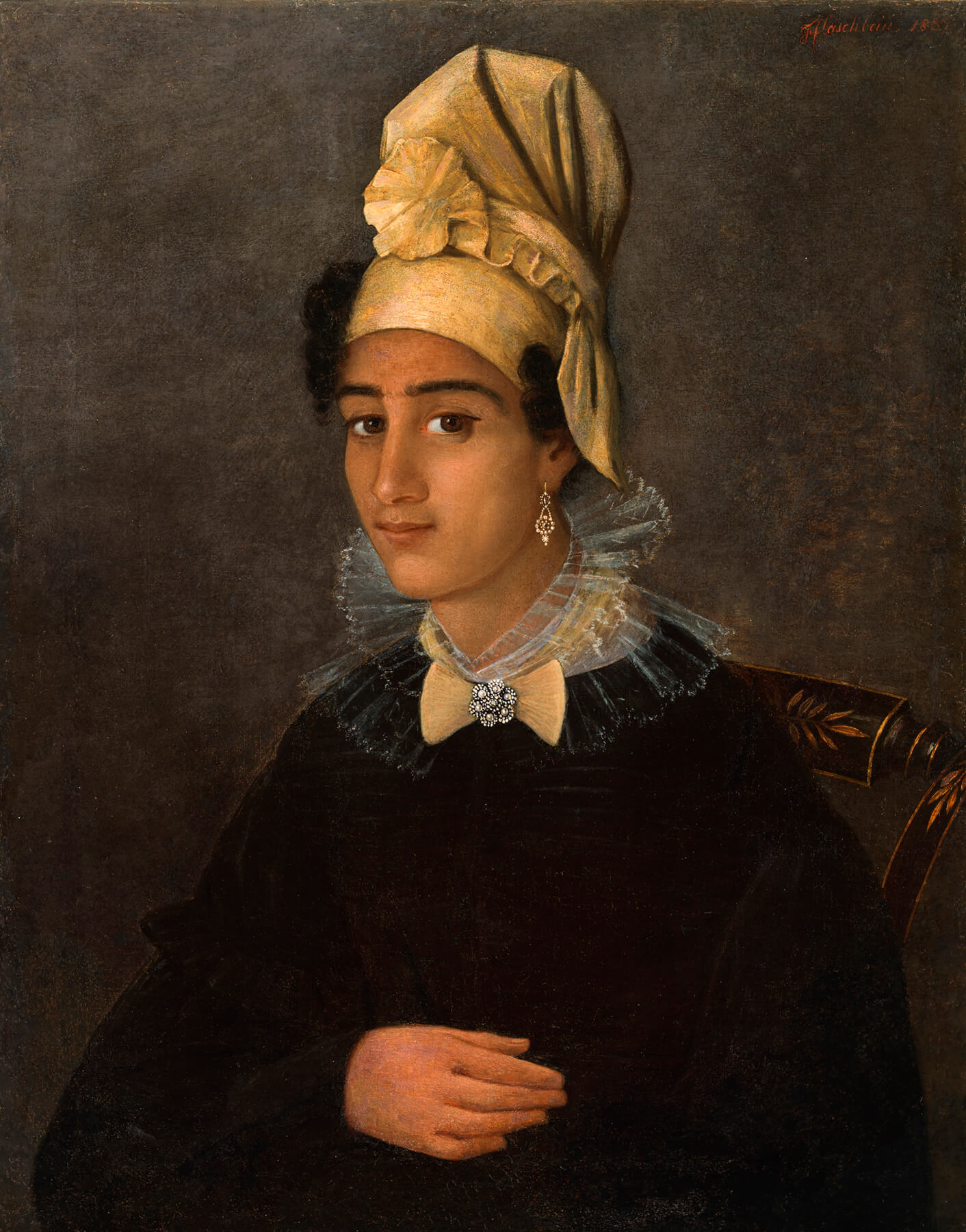
Portrait of a Free Woman of Color

A painting, traditionally attributed variously to Charles Jean-Baptiste Colson or earlier misattributions, is the most frequently reproduced image associated with Marie Laveau in modern publications and popular culture. Support for the identification typically relies on circumstantial factors, including the estimated date (c. 1830s), the New Orleans setting, and the depiction of a free woman of color wearing a madras tignon, a headwrap associated with Creole women of the period. The painting's New Orleans setting and depiction of a free woman of color wearing a tignon have contributed to its later association with Laveau. However, there is no documentary evidence identifying the sitter as Marie Laveau, and art historical research indicates the portrait is more consistent with genre portraiture of anonymous Creole women. The identification appears in records only long after Laveau’s lifetime, suggesting a retrospective attribution rather than a contemporary one.

=== François Fleischbein, Portrait of a Free Woman of Color (c. 1837) ===
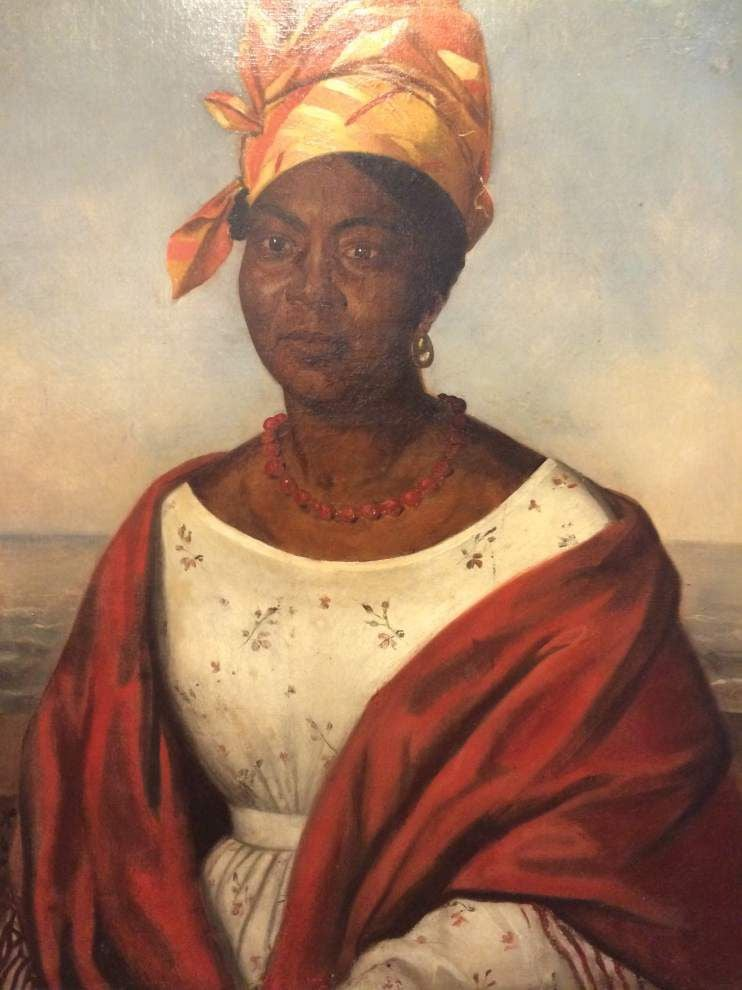
Free Woman of Color, New Orleans

A portrait by François Fleischbein has also been proposed as a depiction of Marie Laveau in later secondary sources and popular accounts. The attribution is based primarily on chronology and social context, as Fleischbein worked in New Orleans during the period in which Laveau lived and painted members of the city’s Creole elite. However, no known archival record or contemporary identification links the sitter to Laveau. Most art historians treat the work as a conventional portrait of an unidentified free woman of color, reflecting status markers and European-influenced portrait conventions rather than a documented likeness of a specific individual.

=== Adolph Rinck, Free Woman of Color, New Orleans (1844) ===
Adolph Rinck's portrait has also been proposed in popular tradition as a possible depiction of Marie Laveau. Like the other works, this identification is not supported by archival evidence. The painting depicts a free woman of color in mid-19th-century New Orleans and is valued primarily as a social document of the period. The suggestion that it portrays Laveau is based on retrospective association rather than documented provenance. Art historical consensus generally treats the work as another example of Rinck’s genre portraits, rather than a confirmed likeness of a specific individual.

== See also ==
- Mojo

== Sources ==
Biographies

- Alvarado, Denise. The Magic of Marie Laveau: Embracing the Spiritual Legacy of the Voodoo Queen of New Orleans. Weiser Books (2020), (ISBN 9781578636730).
- Long, Carolyn Morrow. A New Orleans Voudou Priestess: The Legend and Reality of Marie Laveau. Gainesville: University Press of Florida (2006), (ISBN 9780813029740).
- Tallant, Robert. Voodoo in New Orleans. The MacMillan Co. (1946), (ISBN 978-0882893365)
- Ward, Martha. Voodoo Queen: The Spirited Lives of Marie Laveau. Oxford: University of Mississippi Press (2004) (ISBN 1578066298).
- Long, Carolyn Morrow. The Tomb of Marie Laveau. Left Hand Press (2016) (ISBN 9780692766866)
- Bloody Mary. Hauntings Horrors and Dancing with the Dead: True Stories from the Voodoo Queen of New Orleans. Weiser publishing (2016) (ISBN 1578635667),
- Masarik, Elizabeth Garner (October 25, 2021). "Marie Laveau: The Voodoo Queen and the Laveau Legend". DIG.
- "Marie Laveau, Voodoo Practitioner born". African American Registry.
- "Marie Laveau | Biography & Facts | Britannica". www.britannica.com. February 23, 2024.
