= Christophe Dominick Duminy de Glapion =

French noble (died c. 1855)

Christophe Dominick Duminy de Glapion, also known as Louis Christope Dominick Duminy de Glapion, (died c. 1855) was the plaçage husband of famed Louisiana Voodoo Queen Marie Laveau. He was a white man of noble French descent. They began their relationship sometime before 1826, after the death of Laveau's first, legal, husband, Jacques Paris, who disappeared (and was presumed dead) not long after their marriage. De Glapion fathered seven children with Laveau, but only two of them, Marie Heloïse Euchariste Glapion (b. 1827) and Marie Philomène Glapion (b. 1836), survived into adulthood. The youngest became Laveau's successor, the also famous Marie Laveau II.

== Family ==
The Laveau-Glapion family lived in the original French section of New Orleans, now known as the Vieux Carré or French Quarter, in a cottage on St. Ann Street between Rampart and Burgundy. It was built around 1798 by Marie's grandmother, Catherine Henry, but after they moved in the property became legally owned by de Glapion. After his death, the family was heavily in debt, rumored to be due to de Glapion's unwise business speculations. The St. Ann Street property was seized, but Laveau, her daughters and her grandchildren were allowed to remain in residence when a kind friend bought the house.
