= Redhibitory defect =

Defect that prevents a product from performing the task for which it was purchased

Under contract law in some legal systems, a redhibitory defect is a hidden defect that prevents a product from performing the task for which it was purchased. A buyer of a product with a redhibitory defect can be entitled to a redhibition (also called redhibitory action). In the United States, this is a legal concept unique to the state of Louisiana.
