= William Richardson (South Carolina politician) =

Politician and revolutionary officer

William Richardson (July 13, 1743 – February 17, 1786) was a member of the First Provincial Congress of South Carolina and served as an officer in the American Revolutionary War.

Born in Virginia, he went to Charleston, South Carolina and worked as a merchant. He married Ann Magdalen Guignard and later moved to the High Hills of the Santee Region and became a planter on his 8,000 acre Bloom Hill plantation. During the American Revolution, he served as captain in the first regiment of riflemen and was captured by the British at the fall of Charleston in 1780 and paroled to his plantation. His plantation served as a depot of supplies for state troops when he was appointed Commissary General by Governor John Rutledge, who also used his plantation temporarily as headquarters of state government. He is buried in Bloom Hill Cemetery.

Charles Cotesworth Pinckney, a signer of the US Constitution, was an executor of his estate. William Richardson's portrait hangs in the Yale University Art Gallery.

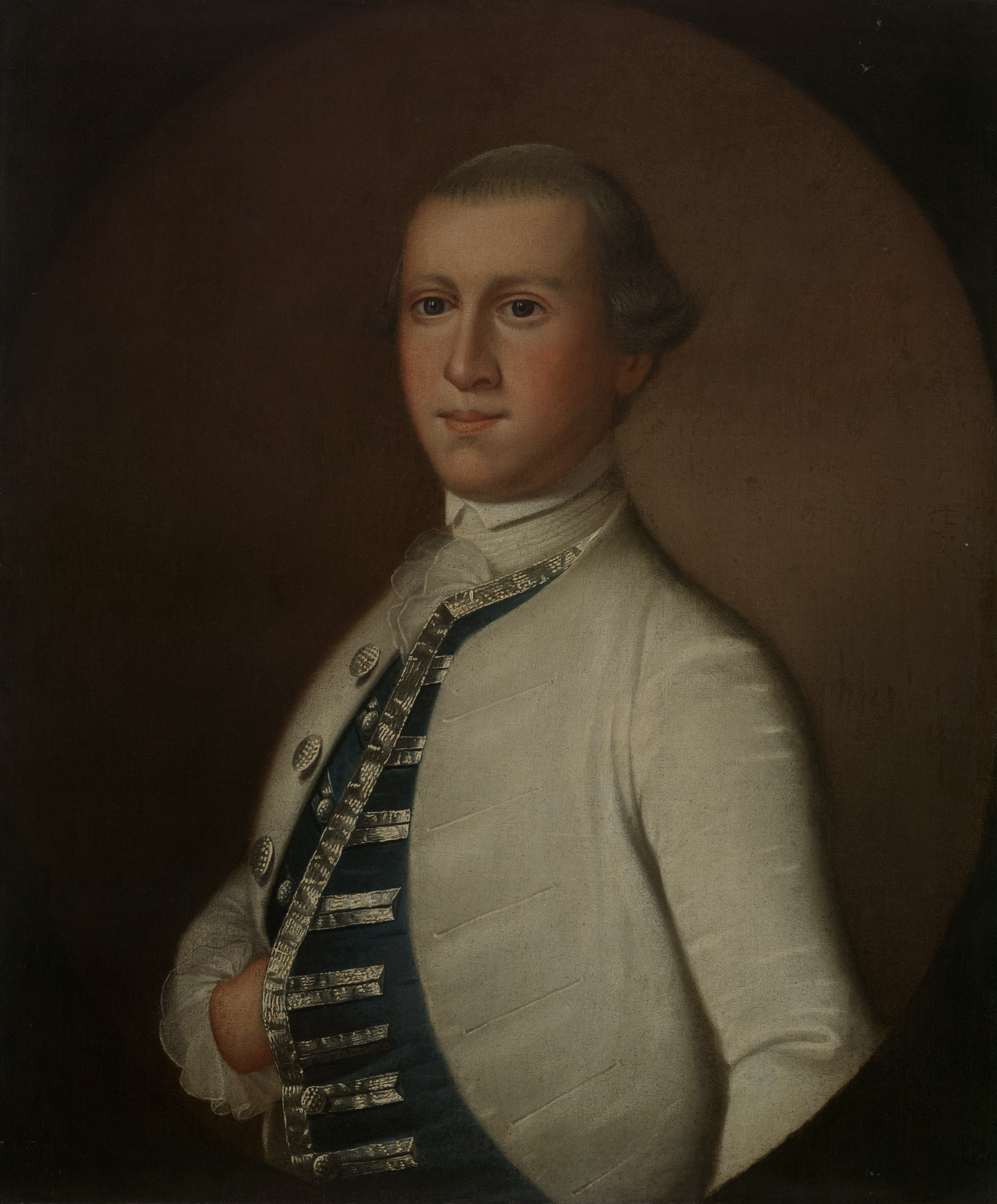
Portrait of William Richardson by Jeremiah Theus, 18th Century
