= Judith Kelleher Schafer =

American historian (1942–2014)

Judith Kelleher Schafer (December 12, 1942 – December 16, 2014) was an American historian who specialized in the study of slavery in the United States, particularly as it functioned in New Orleans, Louisiana.

== Biography ==
A native of New Orleans, she earned her bachelor's degree from H. Sophie Newcomb College. She graduated from Tulane with a master's in history, and then completed her Ph.D. there in 1985, after her two children were grown and gone. Her dissertation was The Long Arm of the Law: Slavery and the Supreme Court in Antebellum Louisiana, 1809–1862. She eventually taught at Tulane University's history department, interdisciplinary studies institute, and law school. Her first book, on slavery-related cases brought to the Louisiana Supreme Court in the antebellum era, won the Simkins Prize of the Southern Historical Association. She was awarded the Garnie McGinty Distinguished Career Award by the Louisiana Historical Association in 2004, and eventually became president of the Association. She won the Gulf Coast Historical Association's Book Prize for 2011. Schafer reported that the Louisiana Supreme Court was unique amongst the states: "One of the hardest things that Gov. Claiborne, the first governor, found was getting somebody qualified that would know Spanish, French and American law and to sort it all out." Hurricane Katrina threatened the archival materials she used for her research but luckily "the library had been built as a bomb shelter during the cold war, and it didn't flood." Schafer died in 2014 and was buried at Metairie Cemetery. She was remembered as a "prolific, thorough, and imaginative scholar, with a keen eye for the telling detail and a fine way with words."

== Selected works ==
- Schafer, Judith Kelleher (1994). Slavery, the Civil Law, and the Supreme Court of Louisiana. Baton Rouge: Louisiana State University Press. ISBN 9780807118450. OCLC 30075362.
- Schafer, Judith Kelleher (2003). Becoming Free, Remaining Free: Manumission and Enslavement in New Orleans, 1846–1862. Baton Rouge: Louisiana State University Press. ISBN 9780807128626. OCLC 51297235.
- Schafer, Judith Kelleher (2009). Brothels, Depravity, and Abandoned Women: Illegal Sex in Antebellum New Orleans. Baton Rouge: Louisiana State University Press. ISBN 9780807133972. OCLC 237048367.
- Schafer, Judith Kelleher (February 1981). "New Orleans Slavery in 1850 as Seen in Advertisements". The Journal of Southern History. 47 (1): 33–56. doi:10.2307/2207055. JSTOR 2207055.
- "The Long Arm of the Law: Slave Criminals and the Supreme Court in Antebellum Louisiana (Tul. L. Rev. 1247)". Tulane Law Review. 60 (6). 1986.
- Schafer, Judith (June 1, 1993). "Sexual Cruelty to Slaves: The Unreported Case of Humphreys v. Utz - Symposium on the Law of Slavery: Criminal and Civil Law of Slavery". Chicago-Kent Law Review. 68 (3): 1313. ISSN 0009-3599.
