= Jefferson College (Mississippi) =

Defunct school, chartered 1802

- U.S. National Register of Historic Places
- U.S. Historic district
- Mississippi Landmark
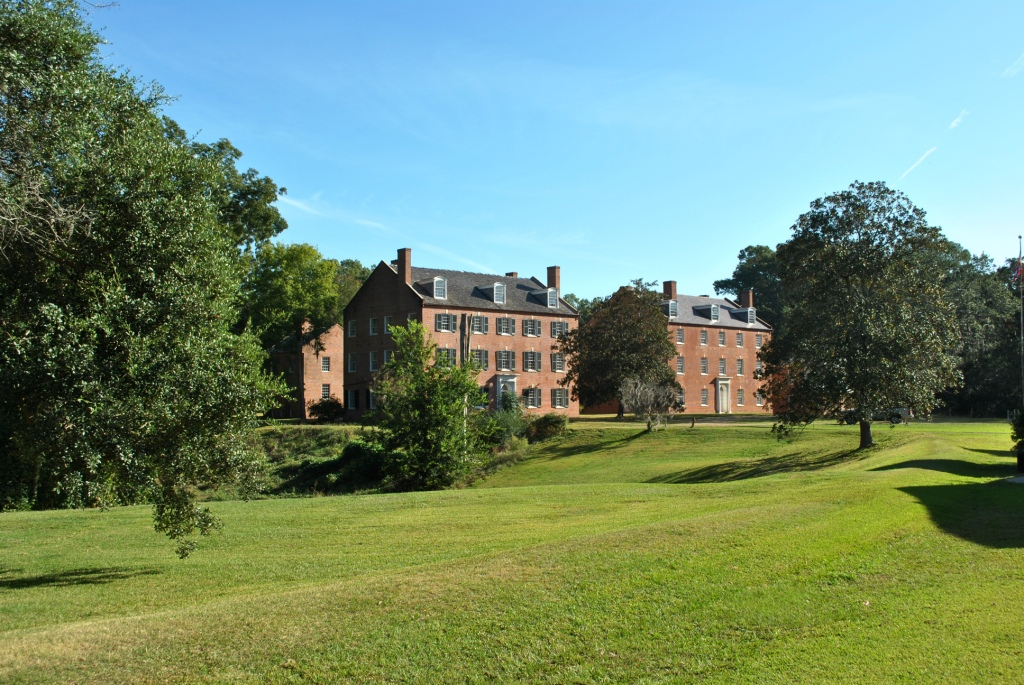
- Jefferson College in 2011

- Location within Mississippi Location within the United States
- Location: 16 Old North St., Washington, Mississippi
- Coordinates: 31°34′52″N 91°18′00″W
- Area: 78.5 acres (31.8 ha)
- Built: 1802
- Architectural style: Federal
- NRHP reference No.: 70000316
- USMS No.: 001-WSH-0100-NR-ML

Significant dates
- Added to NRHP: August 25, 1970
- Designated USMS: May 9, 1985

Jefferson College is a former school in Washington, Mississippi. Named in honor of Thomas Jefferson, the college was chartered in 1802, but did not begin operation until 1811. Jefferson College was founded as an all-male college, but operated primarily as a college-preparatory school, and later became a military boarding school, which it remained for most of its history.

Due to declining enrollment and financial difficulties, the facility closed in 1964. The historic campus was listed on the National Register of Historic Places in 1970, and was designated a Mississippi Landmark in 1985. The site is operated by the Mississippi Department of Archives and History as a historic museum and park. In 2025, it was announced the facility would reopen as a regional field school for historic preservation trades.

== History ==
=== Development ===
Chartered on May 13, 1802, by the General Assembly of the Mississippi Territory, the territorial legislature from 1798, prior to statehood in 1817, Jefferson College was the first institution of higher learning in the territory. It opened in 1811 with 15 students, as a preparatory school, under the name of the Washington Academy, in a one-room, wood-framed structure. By 1817, the institution had become a fully developed college. The first permanent buildings, constructed of brick, were completed in 1820. White Turpin served as a trustee. The Jefferson College Lyceum published a scholarly magazine called the Southwestern Journal.

In 1826, the Governor and Lieutenant Governor of Mississippi were placed on the college's Board of Trustees, and the state legislature was authorized to fill vacancies on the board. Three years later, the college decided to reorganize on the model of the U.S. Military Academy at West Point. E. B. Wiliston became the college's president, and military training was placed under Maj. John Holbrook, who had written a book on military tactics. One year later, the school's enrollment had increased from 98 to 150 cadets.

Maj. Holbrook died in 1832, and was replaced by Alden Partridge, a Northerner noted for his theories on proper military education, and for founding numerous military academies, most of which failed. Partridge's views on slavery were not popular in the state, which led to a decline in support for the school, and Partridge resigned. The school's board decided to drop the West Point system of education; almost immediately, the college's enrollment declined.

By 1840, Jefferson College offered the degrees of Bachelor of Arts and Master of Arts. In 1841 there was a major building fire at the school.

In 1850, the college reverted to providing a military education, which again led to a resurgence of growth.

=== Postbellum ===
During the American Civil War (1861–1865), Jefferson College was closed. When the war ended, the buildings were used during the Reconstruction era (1865–1877) by the Freedmen's Bureau newly set up within the United States Department of War in the US government to aid in the transition of the former slaves to a society of free labor. In November 1865, the school's Board of Trustees regained control of the facility from the bureau. The institution reopened in 1866 as a preparatory school and continued as such for the next 98 years until it closed in 1964.

Between 1872 and 1911, under the tenure of Superintendent J.S. Raymond, the college had its longest interval of stable governance, with increased enrollment. By 1893, the institution had returned to being a military school, taking the name Jefferson Military College. Instruction was entirely secondary education. Early in the 20th century, dormitories were built to accommodate more recruits. By the late 1930s, enrollment had increased to about 100 students.

=== Decline ===
Following World War II, declining student enrollment, low tuition, and lack of external funding caused financial hardship for Jefferson College. After 150 years of operation and unable to pay its debts, the facility closed in May 1964. In 1965, all buildings and lands owned by Jefferson College were conveyed to the State of Mississippi in exchange for discharging the school's debts.

In 1971, Jefferson College was placed under administrative control of the Mississippi Department of Archives and History. Detailed plans were developed for preserving the historic buildings, and restoration work began in the mid-1970s. In 1977, the former campus of Jefferson College was reopened to the public as a State Historic Site.

== Historic buildings ==
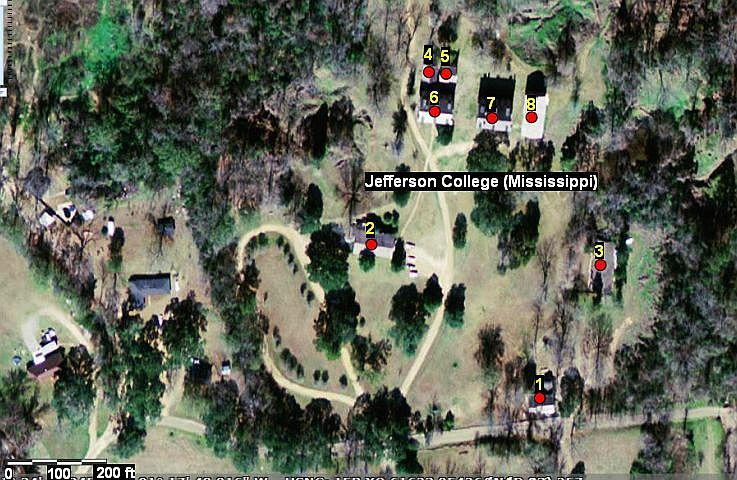
Location of historic buildings at Jefferson College: 1=President's House, 2=Prospere Hall, 3=Carpenter Hall, 4=Steward's Building, 5=East Kitchen, 6=West Wing, 7=East Wing, 8=Raymond Hall

Three buildings, constructed during the 19th century, are contributing resources for the Jefferson College National Historic District:

- The East Wing, completed in 1820, was the first permanent college building. It is a 3-story, brick building constructed in Federal architectural style with a 5-bay facade. School rooms and the library were located on the first floor of the East Wing. Student dormitory rooms were located on the second and third floors, as well as in the attic.
- The President's House is a two-story, wood-frame home that was constructed around 1830 for John Branch and later acquired by Dr. John Inge. The house was located on property adjacent to Jefferson College and was purchased by the college from Dr. Inge in 1842, for use as the college superintendent's residence. In the mid-1970s, MDAH renovated the structure to serve as the residence for the Director of Historic Jefferson College.
- The West Wing was completed in 1839, with the same exterior design as the East Wing. The college mess hall was on the first floor of the West Wing, and the building was also used for faculty apartments and administrative offices.

The old Jefferson College campus includes five other historic buildings constructed during the 19th and early 20th centuries:

- The Steward's Building is a 2-story brick structure completed in 1839. It was used for storage and as lodging for the steward and kitchen staff, who were originally enslaved African-American workers.
- The East Kitchen is a 2-story brick structure completed in 1839. It was the primary cooking area for Jefferson College's faculty and students.
- Raymond Hall is a 2-story brick building constructed in 1915 to serve as a student dormitory. It was damaged by fires in 1940, 1943, and 1947, but was repaired after each incident. As part of the state historic site, Raymond Hall is used as a classroom and public program area.
- Prospere Hall was constructed in 1931 as a dormitory for younger students. The building houses administrative offices and serves as the visitor center and museum for Historic Jefferson College.
- Carpenter Hall was constructed in 1937 as a student dormitory, but in later years it also contained faculty apartments. As part of Historic Jefferson College, Carpenter Hall is mainly used for storage.

== Historic events at Jefferson College ==
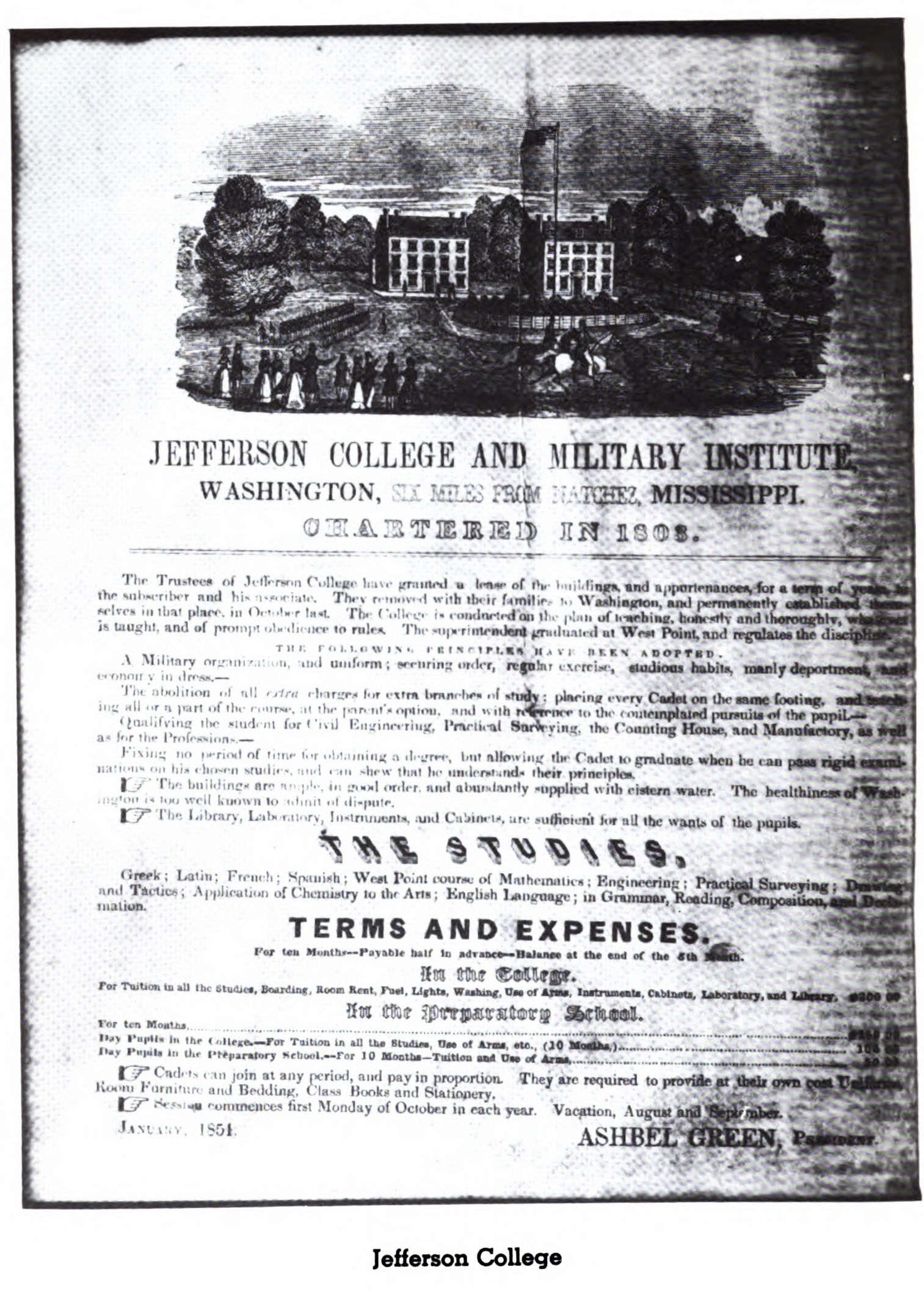
Jefferson College in 1854

≥

In January 1807, former territorial secretary and temporarily acting Governor of the Mississippi Territory, Cowles Mead (1776–1844), suspected that former Vice President Aaron Burr (1756–1836, served 1801–1805 in first Jefferson presidential administration) of a conspiracy to separate the new Old Southwest Territories (recently acquired from Spanish colonial claims) of Mississippi and adjacent Orleans Territories (later State of Louisiana), along the Mississippi River and the port city of New Orleans from the United States and ordered the Mississippi territorial militia to capture Burr to stand trial for treason. In February 1807, a grand jury convened in the territorial capital on the grounds of Jefferson College and after investigation and a hearing, found the ex-Vice President Burr not guilty of any crime or misdemeanor against the United States.

Between 1802 and statehood in 1817, Washington, Mississippi, was the designated territorial capital of the Mississippi Territory, and the General Assembly (legislature) of the territory often met in a tavern known as Assembly Hall, which was located adjacent to Jefferson College. Historic Assembly Hall was destroyed by fire in 1993, 175 years after it had functioned as the seat of government.

Between July 7 and August 17, 1817, the Mississippi Statehood Convention was held in a Methodist church on property adjacent to Jefferson College. Over time, the old church building deteriorated and was no longer standing by the mid-1870s.

== Notable alumni ==
- Albert Gallatin Brown, (1813–1880), Governor of Mississippi (1844 to 1848)
- John Francis Hamtramck Claiborne, a member of the United States House of Representatives / U.S. Congress, from Mississippi
- Jefferson Davis, (1808–1889), first and only president of the Confederate States of America, 1861–1865; previous U.S. Representative, Senator and Secretary of War.
- Pete Heine, Louisiana politician
- Prentiss Ingraham, (1843–1904), Confederate States Army military officer and writer
- Clyde V. Ratcliff, (1879–1952), member of the Louisiana State Senate / upper chamber of Louisiana Legislature from 1944 to 1948

== Jefferson College historic site ==
As a historic site, several buildings are open to the public. These include the West Wing, the kitchen buildings, and Prospere Hall. The T.J. Foster Nature Trails wind though an old-growth hardwood forest over distances of 0.5 miles (0.80 km) to 0.9 miles (1.4 km).

== In popular culture ==
Jefferson College was a location site for several commercial Hollywood theatrical motion pictures and television films / mini-series:

- The Horse Soldiers (1959) – an American Civil War film of historical fiction related to the Vicksburg Campaign. Jefferson College was used as a film location; wherein, uniformed young cadets from a fictitious Southern military academy were shown in formation marching out at dawn in front of the red brick academy buildings.
- Huckleberry Finn (1974) – a made-for-TV film based on the adventure novel by Mark Twain.
- North and South (1985) – an American Civil War historical fiction television miniseries. Jefferson College was used to depict the United States Military Academy at West Point.
- The Adventures of Huck Finn (1993) – a theatrical film where Jefferson College was depicted as the town of Phelps Landing.

== See also ==
- Elizabeth Female Academy
