= 2020–2024 Mississippi Legislature =

Legislative body

←	2016–2020 Mississippi Legislature	2024–2028 Mississippi Legislature	→
- State Seal

Overview
- Legislative body: Mississippi Legislature
- Jurisdiction: Mississippi, United States
- Meeting place: Mississippi State Capitol
- Term: 7 January 2020 – 2 January 2024
- Election: 2019 Mississippi elections

Mississippi State Senate
- Republican (36) Democratic (16)
- Members: 52
- President: Delbert Hosemann
- President pro tempore: Dean Kirby
- Party control: Republican

Mississippi House of Representatives
- Republican (76); Democratic (40); Independent (3); Vacant (3)
- Members: 122
- Speaker: Phillip Gunn
- Speaker pro tempore: Jason White
- Party control: Republican

The 2020–2024 Mississippi Legislature was composed of the Mississippi State Senate and the Mississippi House of Representatives.

General elections for the Senate and the House were held on November 5, 2019. The first session was held from January 7, 2020 to October 10, 2020. In July and August of that session, a COVID-19 outbreak happened among the legislators. Another session was held from January 5, 2021 to April 1, 2021. The 2022 session was scheduled to meet from January 4, 2022 to April 5, 2022. The 2023 session met from January 3, 2023 to April 2, 2023.

== Senate ==
=== Party composition ===
Affiliation	Party (Shading indicates majority caucus)		Total	
Affiliation	Democratic	Republican	Total	Vacant
End of previous legislature (2019)	18	31	49	3
Begin	16	36	52	0
Latest voting share	30.8%	69.2%		

=== Leadership ===
As the Lieutenant Governor, Republican Delbert Hosemann served ex officio as the Senate's President. Republican Dean Kirby, senator from the 30th District, served as the Senate's President pro tempore.

=== Members ===
District	Name	Party	Residence	First elected	Counties represented	Notes
1	Michael McLendon	Rep	Hernando	2020	Desoto	
2	David Parker	Rep	Olive Branch	2013	Desoto	
3	Kathy Chism	Rep	New Albany	2020	Benton, Pontotoc, Union	
4	Rita Potts Parks	Rep	Corinth	2012	Alcorn, Tippah	
5	Daniel Sparks	Rep	Belmont	2020	Itawamba, Prentiss, Tishomingo	
6	Chad McMahan	Rep	Guntown	2016	Itawamba, Lee	
7	Hob Bryan	Dem	Amory	1984	Itawamba, Lee, Monroe	
8	Benjamin Suber	Rep	Bruce	2020	Calhoun, Chickasaw, Lee, Pontotoc, Yalobusha	
9	Nicole Akins Boyd	Rep	Oxford	2020	Lafayette, Panola	
10	Neil Whaley	Rep	Potts Camp	2018	Marshall, Tate	
11	Robert L. Jackson	Dem	Marks	2004	Coahoma, Panola, Quitman Tunica	
12	Derrick Simmons	Dem	Greenville	2011	Bolivar, Coahoma, Washington	
13	Sarita Simmons	Dem	Cleveland	2020	Bolivar, Sunflower, Tallahatchie	
14	Lydia Chassaniol	Rep	Winona	2007	Attala, Carroll, Grenada, Leflore, Montgomery, Panola, Tallahatchie, Yalobusha	
15	Bart Williams	Rep	French Camp	2020	Choctaw, Montgomery, Oktibbeha, Webster	
16	Angela Turner-Ford	Dem	West Point	2013	Clay, Lowndes, Noxubee, Oktibbeha	
17	Charles Younger	Rep	Columbus	2014	Lowndes, Monroe	
18	Jenifer Branning	Rep	Philadelphia	2016	Leake, Neshoba, Winston	
19	Kevin Blackwell	Rep	Southaven	2016	DeSoto, Marshall	
20	Josh Harkins	Rep	Flowood	2012	Rankin	
21	Barbara Blackmon	Dem	Canton	2016	Attala, Holmes, Leake, Madison, Yazoo	Previously served from 1992 to 2003
22	Joseph C. Thomas	Dem	Yazoo City	2020	Sunflower, Humphreys, Madison, Sharkey, Washington, Yazoo	Previously served from 2004 to 2008
23	Briggs Hopson	Rep	Vicksburg	2008	Issaquena, Warren, Yazoo	
24	David Lee Jordan	Dem	Greenwood	1993	Grenada, Holmes, Humphreys, Leflore, Tallahatchie	
25	J. Walter Michel	Rep	Ridgeland	2016	Hinds, Madison	Previously served from 1999 to 2011
26	John Horhn	Dem	Jackson	1993	Hinds, Madison	
27	Hillman Terome Frazier	Dem	Jackson	1993	Hinds	
28	Sollie Norwood	Dem	Jackson	2013	Hinds	
29	David Blount	Dem	Jackson	2008	Hinds	
30	Dean Kirby	Rep	Pearl	1992	Rankin	
31	Tyler McCaughn	Rep	Newton	2020	Lauderdale, Newton, Scott	
32	Sampson Jackson	Dem	Preston	1992	Kemper, Lauderdale, Noxubee, Winston	Resigned June 30, 2021
32	Rod Hickman	Dem	Macon	2021 (Note: Elected to finish the term of Democrat Sampson Jackson, who resigned on June 30, 2021.)	Kemper, Lauderdale, Noxubee, Winston	
33	Jeff Tate	Rep	Meridian	2020	Clarke, Lauderdale	
34	Juan Barnett	Dem	Heidelberg	2020	Forrest, Jasper, Jones	
35	Chris Caughman	Rep	Mendenhall	2016	Copiah, Rankin, Simpson	
36	Albert Butler	Dem	Port Gibson	2010	Claiborne, Copiah, Hinds, Jefferson	
37	Melanie Sojourner	Rep	Natchez	2020	Adams, Amite, Franklin, Pike	Previously served from 2012 to 2015
38	Tammy Witherspoon	Dem	Magnolia	2016	Adams, Amite, Pike, Walthall, Wilkinson	Resigned June 30, 2021
38	Kelvin Butler	Dem	McComb	2021 (Note: Elected to finish the term of Democrat Tammy Witherspoon, who resigned on June 30, 2021.)	Adams, Amite, Pike, Walthall, Wilkinson	
39	Jason Barrett	Rep	Brookhaven	2020	Copiah, Lawrence, Lincoln, Walthall	
40	Angela Burks Hill	Rep	Picayune	2012	Marion, Pearl River	
41	Joey Fillingane	Rep	Sumrall	2007	Covington, Forrest, Jefferson Davis, Lamar, Smith	
42	Chris McDaniel	Rep	Ellisville	2008	Forrest, Jones	
43	Dennis DeBar	Rep	Leakesville	2016	George, Greene, Wayne	
44	John A. Polk	Rep	Hattiesburg	2012	Lamar, Pearl River	
45	Chris Johnson	Rep	Hattiesburg	2020	Forrest, Perry	
46	Philip Moran	Rep	Kiln	2012	Hancock, Harrison	
47	Mike Seymour	Rep	Vancleave	2016	Jackson, Pearl River, Stone	
48	Mike Thompson	Rep	Long Beach	2020	Harrison	
49	Joel Carter	Rep	Gulfport	2018	Harrison	
50	Scott DeLano	Rep	Biloxi	2020	Harrison	
51	Jeremy England	Rep	Vancleave	2020	Jackson	
52	Brice Wiggins	Rep	Pascagoula	2012	Jackson	

== House ==
=== Leadership ===
Phillip Gunn, a Republican from the 56th District, served as Speaker of the House. Jason White, Republican from the 48th District, served as the Speaker pro tempore.

=== Party composition ===
Affiliation	Party (Shading indicates majority caucus)			Total	
Affiliation	Democratic	Republican	Independent	Total	Vacant
End of previous legislature (2019)	44	74	2	120	2
Begin 2020-2024 legislature (Note: Two members who were elected in November 2019 as Democrats, Kevin Horan and Michael Evans, began their terms as unaffiliated Independents.)	44	75	3	122	0
2020–2021 (Note: At some point prior to April 2021 Kevin Horan changed his affiliation from Independent to Republican. Exact date unknown.)	44	76	2	122	0
November 1, 2021 (Note: Jon Ray Lancaster switched parties from Democratic to Republican.)	43	77	2	122	0
January 13, 2022 (Note: Shanda Yates changed her affiliation from Democratic to Independent.)	42	77	3	122	0
December 29, 2022 (Note: Debra Gibbs resigned on December 29, 2022 to become a Circuit Court Judge for Hinds County.)	41	77	3	121	1
April 2023 (Note: Kenneth Walker announced as Assistant Chief for the Natural Resources Conservation Service for the U.S. Department of Agriculture on March 23, 2023. Exact resignation date unknown.)	40	77	3	120	2
August 27, 2023 (Note: Mac Huddleston died on August 27, 2023.)	40	76	3	119	3
Latest voting share	33.6%	63.9%	2.5%		

=== List of members ===
District	Representative	Party	Assumed office	Residence	Notes
1	Lester Carpenter	Republican	2008	Burnsville	
2	Nick Bain	Republican	2012	Corinth	
3	William Tracy Arnold	Republican	2012	Booneville	
4	Jody Steverson	Republican	2012	Ripley	
5	John Faulkner	Democratic	2014	Holly Springs	
6	Dana Criswell	Republican	2016	Olive Branch	
7	Steve Hopkins	Republican	2016	Southaven	
8	Trey Lamar	Republican	2012	Senatobia	
9	Cedric Burnett	Democratic	2016	Tunica	
10	Brady Williamson	Republican	2020	Oxford	
11	Lataisha Jackson	Democratic	2013	Como	
12	Clay Deweese	Republican	2020	Oxford	
13	Steve Massengill	Republican	2012	Hickory Flat	
14	Sam Creekmore IV	Republican	2020	New Albany	
15	Mac Huddleston	Republican	2008		Died August 27, 2023
15	Vacant	Vacant	2023		
16	Rickey W. Thompson	Democratic	2020	Shannon	
17	Shane Aguirre	Republican	2016	Tupelo	
18	Jerry Turner	Republican	2004	Baldwyn	
19	Randy Boyd	Republican	2012	Mantachie	
20	Chris Brown	Republican	2012	Nettleton	
21	Donnie Bell	Republican	2008	Fulton	
22	Jon Ray Lancaster	Republican	2020	Houston	
23	Perry Van Bailey	Republican	2023	Calhoun City	
24	Jeff Hale	Republican	2016	Nesbit	
25	Dan Eubanks	Republican	2016	Walls	
26	Orlando Paden	Democratic	2016	Clarksdale	
27	Kenneth Walker	Democratic	2016		Resigned 2023
27	Vacant	Vacant	2023		
28	Jerry Darnell	Republican	2020	Hernando	
29	Robert L. Sanders	Democratic	2021	Cleveland	
30	Tracey Rosebud	Democratic	2016	Tutwiler	
31	Otis Anthony	Democratic	2018	Indianola	
32	Solomon Osborne	Democratic	2019	Greenwood	
33	Thomas Reynolds II	Democratic	1980	Charleston	
34	Kevin Horan	Republican	2012	Grenada	
35	Joey Hood	Republican	2012	Ackerman	
36	Karl Gibbs	Democratic	2013	West Point	
37	Lynn Wright	Republican	2020	Columbus	Died June 17, 2022
37	Andy Boyd	Republican	2022	Columbus	
38	Cheikh Taylor	Democratic	2017	Starkville	
39	Dana McLean	Republican	2020	Columbus	
40	Hester Jackson-McCray	Democratic	2020	Horn Lake	
41	Kabir Karriem	Democratic	2016	Columbus	
42	Carl Mickens	Democratic	2016	Brooksville	
43	Rob Roberson	Republican	2016	Starkville	
44	C. Scott Bounds	Republican	2004	Philadelphia	
45	Michael Evans	Independent	2012	Preston	
46	Karl Oliver	Republican	2016	Winona	
47	Bryant Clark	Democratic	2004	Pickens	
48	Jason White	Republican	2012	West	Speaker pro tempore since 2020
49	Willie Bailey	Democratic	1995	Greenville	
50	John Hines	Democratic	2001	Greenville	
51	Rufus Straughter	Democratic	1996	Belzoni	
52	Bill Kinkade	Republican	2013	Byhalia	
53	Vince Mangold	Republican	2016	Brookhaven	
54	Kevin Ford	Republican	2017	Vicksburg	
55	Oscar Denton	Democratic	2013	Vicksburg	
56	Philip Gunn	Republican	2004	Clinton	Speaker of the House since 2012
57	Edward Blackmon Jr.	Democratic	1984	Canton	
58	Joel Bomgar	Republican	2016	Madison	
59	Brent Powell	Republican	2013	Brandon	
60	Fred Shanks	Republican	2018	Brandon	
61	Gene Newman	Republican	2020	Pearl	
62	Thomas Weathersby Sr.	Republican	1992	Florence	
63	Stephanie Foster	Democratic	2020	Jackson	
64	Shanda Yates	Independent	2020	Jackson	
65	Chris Bell	Democratic	2016	Jackson	
66	De'Keither Stamps	Democratic	2020	Jackson	
67	Earle S. Banks	Democratic	1993	Jackson	
68	Zakiya Summers	Democratic	2020	Jackson	
69	Alyce Clarke	Democratic	1985	Jackson	
70	Bo Brown	Democratic	2020	Jackson	
71	Ronnie Crudup Jr.	Democratic	2019	Jackson	
72	Debra Gibbs	Democratic	2016		Resigned December 29, 2022
72	Vacant	Vacant	2022		
73	Jill Ford	Republican	2020	Madison	
74	Lee Yancey	Republican	2020	Brandon	
75	Tom Miles	Democratic	2012	Forest	
76	Gregory Holloway Sr.	Democratic	2000	Hazlehurst	
77	Price Wallace	Republican	2018	Mendenhall	
78	Randy Rushing	Republican	2012	Decatur	
79	Mark Tullos	Republican	2016	Raleigh	
80	Omeria Scott	Democratic	1993	Laurel	
81	Stephen Horne	Republican	2004	Meridian	
82	Charles Young	Democratic	2012	Meridian	
83	Billy Adam Calvert	Republican	2020	Meridian	
84	Troy Smith	Republican	2020	Enterprise	
85	Jeffery Harness	Democratic	2018	Fayette	
86	Shane Barnett	Republican	2016	Waynesboro	
87	Joseph Tubb	Republican	2020	Purvis	
88	Robin Robinson	Republican	2020	Laurel	
89	Donnie Scoggin	Republican	2017	Ellisville	
90	Noah Sanford	Republican	2017	Collins	
91	Bob Evans	Democratic	2008	Monticello	
92	Becky Currie	Republican	2008	Brookhaven	
93	Timmy Ladner	Republican	2012	Poplarville	
94	Robert Johnson III	Democratic	2004	Natchez	Minority leader
95	Jay McKnight	Republican	2020	Gulfport	
96	Angela Cockerham	Independent	2005	Magnolia	
97	Sam Mims V	Republican	2004	McComb	
98	Daryl Porter Jr.	Democratic	2020	Summit	
99	Bill Pigott	Republican	2008	Tylertown	
100	Ken Morgan	Republican	2007	Morgantown	
101	Kent McCarty	Republican	2019	Hattiesburg	
102	Missy McGee	Republican	2017	Hattiesburg	
103	Percy Watson	Democratic	1980	Hattiesburg	
104	Larry Byrd	Republican	2008	Petal	
105	Dale Goodin	Republican	2020	Richton	
106	Jansen Owen	Republican	2020	Poplarville	
107	Doug McLeod	Republican	2012	Lucedale	
108	Stacey Hobgood-Wilkes	Republican	2017	Picayune	
109	Manly Barton	Republican	2012	Moss Point	
110	Jeramey Anderson	Democratic	2013	Escatawpa	
111	Charles Busby	Republican	2012	Pascagoula	
112	John Read	Republican	1994	Gautier	
113	Henry Zuber III	Republican	2000	Ocean Springs	
114	Jeffrey S. Guice	Republican	2008	Ocean Springs	
115	Randall Patterson	Republican	2004	Biloxi	
116	Casey Eure	Republican	2011	Saucier	
117	Kevin Felsher	Republican	2020	Biloxi	
118	Greg Haney	Republican	2012	Gulfport	
119	Sonya Williams-Barnes	Democratic	2012		Resigned May 8, 2022
119	Jeffrey Hulum III	Democratic	2022	Gulfport	
120	Richard Bennett	Republican	2008	Long Beach	
121	Carolyn Crawford	Republican	2012	Pass Christian	
122	Brent Anderson	Republican	2020	Bay St. Louis	
