= 2016–2020 Mississippi Legislature =

←	2012–2016 Mississippi Legislature	2020–2024 Mississippi Legislature	→
- State Seal

Overview
- Legislative body: Mississippi Legislature
- Jurisdiction: Mississippi, United States
- Meeting place: Mississippi State Capitol
- Term: 6 January 2016 – 7 January 2020
- Election: 2015 Mississippi elections

Mississippi State Senate
- Members: 52
- President: Tate Reeves
- President pro tempore: Terry C. Burton
- Party control: Republican

Mississippi House of Representatives
- Members: 122
- Speaker: Phillip Gunn
- Speaker pro tempore: Greg Snowden
- Party control: Republican

The 2016–2020 Mississippi Legislature met in Jackson, Mississippi, in six sessions between January 6, 2016, and March 29, 2019.

== Timeline ==
The general election was held on November 3, 2015. The term began when legislators were sworn in on January 6, 2016. The dates of the sessions were: January 6, 2016 – April 24, 2016; June 28, 2016 – June 29, 2016; January 3, 2017 – April 2, 2017; January 2, 2018 – March 28, 2018; August 23, 2018 (one day); and January 8, 2019 – March 29, 2019. The first session of the following term, the 2020–2024 Mississippi Legislature, started on January 7, 2020.

== Senate ==
=== Party affiliations ===
Affiliation	Party (Shading indicates majority caucus)		Total	
Affiliation	Democratic	Republican	Total	Vacant
End of previous legislature	23	28	51	1
Begin	21	31	52	0
End of previous legislature	20	32	52	0
Begin	20	32	52	0
January 19, 2016	20	31	51	1
March 8, 2016	20	32	52	0
July 25, 2017	19	32	51	1
October 16, 2017	19	31	50	2
November 28, 2017	19	32	51	1
December 19, 2017	19	33	52	0
April 30, 2019	19	32	51	1
July 1, 2019	18	31	49	3
Latest voting share	36.73%	63.27%		

=== Membership ===
The Mississippi State Senate was composed of the following 52 members.

District	Name	Party	Residence	Notes
1	Chris Massey	Rep	Nesbit	
2	David Parker	Rep	Olive Branch	
3	Nickey Browning	Rep	Pontotoc	
4	Rita Potts Parks	Rep	Corinth	
5	J. P. Wilemon	Dem	Belmont	
6	Chad McMahan	Rep	Guntown	
7	Hob Bryan	Dem	Amory	
8	Russell Jolly	Dem	Houston	
9	Gray Tollison	Rep	Oxford	
10	Bill Stone	Dem	Holly Springs	Left Office July 2017
10	Neil S. Whaley	Rep	Holly Springs	Assumed office December 11, 2017
11	Robert L. Jackson	Dem	Marks	
12	Derrick Simmons	Dem	Greenville	
13	Willie Lee Simmons	Dem	Cleveland	
14	Lydia Chassaniol	Rep	Winona	
15	Gary Jackson	Rep	French Camp	
16	Angela Turner	Dem	West Point	
17	Charles Younger	Rep	Columbus	
18	Jenifer Branning	Rep	Philadelphia	
19	Kevin Blackwell	Rep	Southaven	
20	Josh Harkins	Rep	Flowood	
21	Barbara Blackmon	Dem	Canton	
22	Eugene S. Clarke	Rep	Hollandale	
23	Briggs Hopson	Rep	Vicksburg	
24	David Lee Jordan	Dem	Greenwood	
25	J. Walter Michel	Rep	Ridgeland	
26	John A. Horhn	Dem	Jackson	
27	Hillman Terome Frazier	Dem	Jackson	
28	Sollie Norwood	Dem	Jackson	
29	David Blount	Dem	Jackson	
30	Dean Kirby	Rep	Pearl	
31	Terry C. Burton	Rep	Newton	
32	Sampson Jackson II	Dem	Preston	
33	Videt Carmichael	Rep	Meridian	Left office April 2019
34	Juan Barnett	Dem	Heidelberg	
35	Chris Caughman	Rep	Mendenhall	
36	Albert Butler	Dem	Port Gibson	
37	Bob M. Dearing	Dem	Natchez	Resigned July 2019
38	Tammy Witherspoon	Dem	Magnolia	
39	Sally Doty	Rep	Brookhaven	
40	Angela Burks Hill	Rep	Picayune	
41	Joey Fillingane	Rep	Sumrall	
42	Chris McDaniel	Rep	Ellisville	
43	Dennis DeBar	Rep	Leakesville	
44	John A. Polk	Rep	Hattiesburg	
45	Billy Hudson	Rep	Hattiesburg	
46	Philip Moran	Rep	Kiln	
47	Joseph Seymour	Rep	Vancleave	
48	Deborah Jeanne Dawkins	Dem	Pass Christian	
49	Joel Carter	Rep	Gulfport	
50	Tommy Gollott	Rep	Biloxi	Resigned July 2019
51	Michael Watson	Rep	Pascagoula	
52	Brice Wiggins	Rep	Pascagoula	

== House ==
=== Leadership ===
The Republican Party controlled the House. Philip Gunn served as Speaker of the House and Greg Snowden served as the Speaker pro tempore.

=== Membership ===
District	Representative	Party	Assumed office	Residence	Notes
1	Lester Carpenter	Republican	2008	Burnsville	
2	Nick Bain	Republican	2012	Corinth	
3	William Tracy Arnold	Republican	2012	Booneville	
4	Jody Steverson	Republican	2012	Ripley	
5	John Faulkner	Democratic	2014	Holly Springs	
6	Dana Criswell	Republican	2016	Olive Branch	
7	Steve Hopkins	Republican	2016	Southaven	
8	Trey Lamar	Republican	2012	Senatobia	
9	Cedric Burnett	Democratic	2016	Tunica	
10	Nolan Mettetal	Republican	2012	Sardis	
11	Lataisha Jackson	Democratic	2013	Como	
12	J. P. Hughes Jr.	Republican	2016	Oxford	
13	Steve Massengill	Republican	2012	Hickory Flat	
14	Margaret Ellis Rogers	Republican	2004	New Albany	
15	Mac Huddleston	Republican	2008	Pontotoc	
16	Steve Holland	Democratic	1984	Plantersville	
17	Shane Aguirre	Republican	2016	Tupelo	
18	Jerry Turner	Republican	2004	Baldwyn	
19	Randy Boyd	Republican	2012	Mantachie	
20	Chris Brown	Republican	2012	Nettleton	
21	Donnie Bell	Republican	2008	Fulton	
22	Preston E. Sullivan	Republican	2004	Okolona	
23	Jim Beckett	Republican	2004	Bruce	
24	Jeff Hale	Republican	2016	Nesbit	
25	Dan Eubanks	Republican	2016	Walls	
26	Orlando Paden	Democratic	2016	Clarksdale	
27	Kenneth Walker	Democratic	2016	Carthage	
28	Robert Foster	Republican	2016	Jackson	
29	Linda F. Coleman	Democratic	1992	Mound Bayou	
29	Abe Marshall Hudson	Democratic	2017	Shelby	
30	Robert E. Huddleston	Democratic	1996	Sumner	
31	Sara Richardson Thomas	Democratic	1997	Indianola	
32	Willie J. Perkins Sr.	Democratic	1993	Greenwood	
33	Thomas Reynolds II	Democratic	1980	Charleston	
34	Kevin Horan	Republican	2012	Grenada	
35	Joey Hood	Republican	2012	Ackerman	
36	Karl Gibbs	Democratic	2013	West Point	
37	Gary A. Chism	Republican	2000	Columbus	
38	Tyrone Ellis	Democratic	1980	Starkville	
39	Jeff Smith	Republican	1992	Columbus	
40	Ashley Henley	Democratic	2016	Southaven	
41	Kabir Karriem	Democratic	2016	Columbus	
42	Carl Mickens	Democratic	2016	Brooksville	
43	Rob Roberson	Republican	2016	Starkville	
44	C. Scott Bounds	Republican	2004	Philadelphia	
45	Michael Evans	Independent	2012	Preston	
46	Karl Oliver	Republican	2016	Winona	
47	Bryant Clark	Democratic	2004	Pickens	
48	Jason White	Republican	2012	West	
49	Willie Bailey	Democratic	1995	Greenville	
50	John Hines	Democratic	2001	Greenville	
51	Rufus Straughter	Democratic	1996	Belzoni	
52	Bill Kinkade	Republican	2013	Byhalia	
53	Vince Mangold	Republican	2016	Brookhaven	
54	Alex Monsour	Republican	2008	Vicksburg	
54	Kevin Ford	Republican	2017	Vicksburg	
55	Oscar Denton	Democratic	2013	Vicksburg	
56	Philip Gunn	Republican	2004	Clinton	Speaker of the House since 2012
57	Edward Blackmon Jr.	Democratic	1984	Canton	
58	Joel Bomgar	Republican	2016	Madison	
59	Brent Powell	Republican	2013	Brandon	
60	John L. Moore	Republican	1996	Brandon	
60	Fred Shanks	Republican	2018	Brandon	
61	Ray Rogers	Republican	1984	Pearl	
62	Thomas Weathersby Sr.	Republican	1992	Florence	
63	Deborah Butler Dixon	Democratic	2012	Raymond	
64	William C. Denny Jr.	Independent	1988	Jackson	Republican
65	Chris Bell	Democratic	2016	Jackson	
66	Jarvis Dortch	Democratic	2016	Raymond	
67	Earle S. Banks	Democratic	1993	Jackson	
68	Credell Calhoun	Democratic	2004	Jackson	Also served 1980 to 1992
69	Alyce Clarke	Democratic	1985	Jackson	
70	Kathy Sykes	Democratic	2016	Jackson	
71	Adrienne Wooten	Democratic	2008	Jackson	Left office in 2018.
71	Ronnie Crudup Jr.	Democratic	2019	Jackson	
72	Debra Gibbs	Democratic	2016		
73	Cory Wilson	Republican	2016	Madison	
74	Mark Baker	Republican	2004	Brandon	
75	Tom Miles	Democratic	2012	Forest	
76	Gregory Holloway Sr.	Democratic	2000	Hazlehurst	
77	Andy Gipson	Republican	2008	Braxton	Appointed Agriculture Commissioner 2018
77	Price Wallace	Republican	2018	Mendenhall	
78	Randy Rushing	Republican	2012	Decatur	
79	Mark Tullos	Republican	2016	Raleigh	
80	Omeria Scott	Democratic	1993	Laurel	
81	Stephen Horne	Republican	2004	Meridian	
82	Charles Young	Democratic	2012	Meridian	
83	Greg Snowden	Republican	2000	Meridian	Speaker pro tempore since 2012
84	William Shirley	Republican	2012	Quitman	
85	Chuck Middleton	Democratic	1996	Port Gibson	
85	Jeffery Harness	Democratic	2018	Fayette	
86	Shane Barnett	Republican	2016	Waynesboro	
87	Chris Johnson	Republican	2016	Hattiesburg	
88	Gary V. Staples	Republican	2004	Laurel	Previously served 1988-1992
89	Bobby Shows	Republican	1992	Ellisville	Retired July 1, 2016
89	Donnie Scoggin	Republican	2017	Ellisville	
90	Noah Sanford	Republican	2016	Collins	
91	Bob Evans	Democratic	2008	Monticello	
92	Becky Currie	Republican	2008	Brookhaven	
93	Timmy Ladner	Republican	2012	Poplarville	
94	Robert Johnson III	Democratic	2004	Natchez	Minority leader
95	Patricia H. Willis	Republican	2013	Diamondhead	
96	Angela Cockerham	Independent	2005	Magnolia	
97	Sam Mims V	Republican	2004	McComb	
98	David W. Myers	Democratic	1996	McComb	
99	Bill Pigott	Republican	2008	Tylertown	
100	Ken Morgan	Republican	2007	Morgantown	
101	Brad A. Touchstone	Republican	2016	Hattiesburg	
101	Kent McCarty	Republican	2019	Hattiesburg	
102	Toby Barker	Republican	2008	Hattiesburg	
102	Missy McGee	Republican	2017	Hattiesburg	
103	Percy Watson	Democratic	1980	Hattiesburg	
104	Larry Byrd	Republican	2008	Petal	
105	Roun S. McNeal	Republican	2016	Leakesville	
106	Herb Frierson	Republican	1992	Poplarville	Resigned June 30, 2016
106	John Glen Corley	Republican	2017	Lumberton	
107	Doug McLeod	Republican	2012	Lucedale	
108	Mark Formby	Republican	1993	Picayune	
108	Stacey Hobgood-Wilkes	Republican	2017	Picayune	
109	Manly Barton	Republican	2012	Moss Point	
110	Jeramey Anderson	Democratic	2013	Escatawpa	
111	Charles Busby	Republican	2012	Pascagoula	
112	John Read	Republican	1994	Gautier	
113	Henry Zuber III	Republican	2000	Ocean Springs	
114	Jeffrey S. Guice	Republican	2008	Ocean Springs	
115	Randall Patterson	Republican	2004	Biloxi	
116	Casey Eure	Republican	2011	Saucier	
117	Scott DeLano	Republican	2010	Biloxi	
118	Greg Haney	Republican	2012	Gulfport	
119	Sonya Williams-Barnes	Democratic	2012	Gulfport	
120	Richard Bennett	Republican	2008	Long Beach	
121	Carolyn Crawford	Republican	2012	Pass Christian	
122	David W. Baria	Republican	2012	Bay St. Louis	Served in Senate 2008 to 2012
