= 2012–2016 Mississippi Legislature =

←	2008–2012 Mississippi Legislature	2016–2020 Mississippi Legislature	→
- State Seal

Overview
- Legislative body: Mississippi Legislature
- Jurisdiction: Mississippi, United States
- Meeting place: Mississippi State Capitol
- Term: 6 January 2012 – 6 January 2016
- Election: 2011 Mississippi elections

Mississippi State Senate
- Members: 52
- President: Tate Reeves
- President pro tempore: Terry W. Brown (2012–2014); Giles Ward (2015)
- Party control: Republican

Mississippi House of Representatives
- Members: 122
- Speaker: Phillip Gunn
- Speaker pro tempore: Greg Snowden
- Party control: Republican

The 2012–2016 Mississippi Legislature met in multiple sessions in the 2012-2016 term. They were from: January 3, 2012 – May 3, 2012; January 8, 2013 – April 4, 2013; April 26, 2013; June 27–28, 2013; January 7, 2014 – April 6, 2014; May 8, 2014; and January 6, 2015 – April 5, 2015. The next session, the 2016–2020 Mississippi Legislature started on January 6, 2016.

== Officers ==
=== Senate ===
==== Presiding Officer ====
Position	Name	Party	District
President	Tate Reeves	Republican Party	n/a (Lieut. Gov.)
President Pro Tempore	Terry W. Brown (Note: Died in office on Sep. 4, 2014)	Republican Party	17
President Pro Tempore	Giles Ward (Note: Elected on Jan 5 2015)	Republican Party	18

=== House of Representatives ===
==== Presiding Officer ====
Position	Name	Party	District
Speaker of the House	Phillip Gunn	Republican Party	56
Speaker Pro Tempore	Greg Snowden	Republican Party	83

== Composition ==
The following composition reflects the balance of power after the 2011 elections, which was the first election since Reconstruction to give a majority of seats in the State House to the Republicans.

=== House ===
Affiliation	Party (Shading indicates majority caucus)		Total	
Affiliation	Democratic	Republican	Total	Vacant
End of previous legislature (2011)	67	55	122	
Begin	58	64	122	0
July 20, 2012	58	63	121	1
November 19, 2012	58	62	120	2
November 27, 2012	58	63	121	1
December 10, 2012	57	64	121	1
January 11, 2013	57	65	122	0
January 13, 2013	56	65	121	1
February 4, 2013	55	65	120	2
March 24, 2013	55	64	119	3
April 4, 2013	56	64	120	2
April 26, 2013	57	64	121	1
June 10, 2013	57	65	122	0
July 1, 2013	54	65	119	3
January 2014	57	65	122	0
September 15, 2014	56	66	122	0
February 12, 2015	55	66	121	1
April 6, 2015	55	67	122	0
June 10, 2015	54	67	121	1
November 5, 2015	53	68	121	1
Latest voting share	43.4%	55.7%		

=== Senate ===
District	Name	Party	Residence	Gender
1	Chris Massey	Rep	Nesbit	M
2	Bill Stone	Dem	Holly Springs	M
3	Nickey Browning	Rep	Pontotoc	M
4	Rita Potts Parks	Rep	Corinth	F
5	J. P. Wilemon	Dem	Belmont	M
6	Nancy Adams Collins	Rep		F
7	Hob Bryan	Dem	Amory	M
8	Russell Jolly	Dem	Houston	M
9	Gray Tollison	Rep	Oxford	M
10	Steve Hale	Dem	Senatobia	M
11	Robert L. Jackson	Dem	Marks	M
12	Derrick Simmons	Dem	Greenville	M
13	Willie Lee Simmons	Dem	Cleveland	M
14	Lydia Chassaniol	Rep	Winona	F
15	Gary Jackson	Rep	French Camp	M
16	Angela Turner	Dem	West Point	F
17	Charles Younger	Rep	Columbus	M
18	Giles Ward	Rep	Louisville	M
19	David Parker	Rep	Olive Branch	M
20	Josh Harkins	Rep	Flowood	M
21	Kenneth Wayne Jones	Dem	Canton	M
22	Eugene S. Clarke	Rep	Hollandale	M
23	Briggs Hopson	Rep	Vicksburg	M
24	David Lee Jordan	Dem	Greenwood	M
25	Will Longwitz	Rep	Madison	M
26	John A. Horhn	Dem	Jackson	M
27	Hillman Terome Frazier	Dem	Jackson	M
28	Sollie Norwood	Dem	Jackson	M
29	David Blount	Dem	Jackson	M
30	Dean Kirby	Rep	Pearl	M
31	Terry Clark Burton	Rep	Newton	M
32	Sampson Jackson II	Dem	Preston	M
33	Videt Carmichael	Rep	Meridian	M
34	Haskins Montgomery	Dem	Bay Springs	M
35	Perry Lee	Rep	Mendenhall	M
36	Albert Butler	Dem	Port Gibson	M
37	Melanie Sojourner	Rep	Natchez	F
38	Kelvin Butler	Dem	McComb	M
39	Sally Doty	Rep	Brookhaven	F
40	Angela Burks Hill	Rep	Picayune	F
41	Joey Fillingane	Rep	Sumrall	M
42	Chris McDaniel	Rep	Ellisville	M
43	Phillip A. Gandy	Rep	Waynesboro	M
44	John A. Polk	Rep	Hattiesburg	M
45	Billy Hudson	Rep	Hattiesburg	M
46	Philip Moran	Rep	Kiln	M
47	Tony Smith	Rep	Picayune	M
48	Deborah Jeanne Dawkins	Dem	Pass Christian	F
49	Sean Tindell	Rep	Gulfport	M
50	Thomas Arlin Gollot	Rep	Biloxi	M
51	Michael Watson	Rep	Pascagoula	M
52	Brice Wiggins	Rep	Pascagoula	M

=== House ===
District	Name	Party	Residence
1	Lester Carpenter	Rep	Burnsville
2	Nick Bain	Dem	Corinth
3	William Tracy Arnold	Rep	Booneville
4	Jody Steverson	Rep	Ripley
5	John Faulkner	Dem	Holly Springs
6	Eugene Hamilton	Rep	Olive Branch
7	Wanda Jennings	Rep	Southaven
8	Trey Lamar	Rep	Senatobia
9	Clara Burnett	Dem	Tunica
10	Nolan Mettetal	Rep	Sardis
11	Lataisha Jackson	Dem	Como
12	Brad Mayo	Rep	Oxford
13	Steve Massengill	Rep	Hickory Flat
14	Margaret Rogers	Rep	New Albany
15	Mac Huddleston	Rep	Pontotoc
16	Stephen Holland	Dem	Plantersville
17	Brian Aldridge	Rep	Tupelo
18	Jerry Turner	Rep	Baldwyn
19	Randy Boyd	Rep	Mantachie
20	Chris Brown	Rep	Aberdeen
21	Donnie Bell	Rep	Fulton
22	Preston Sullivan	Dem	Okolona
23	Charles Beckett	Rep	Bruce
24	Kevin Horan	Dem	Grenada
25	Gene Alday	Rep	Wells
26	Chuck Espy	Dem	Clarksdale
27	Ferr Smith	Dem	Carthage
28	Tommy Taylor	Rep	Boyle
29	Linda Coleman	Dem	Mound Bayou
30	Robert Huddleston	Dem	Sumner
31	Sara Thomas	Dem	Indianola
32	Willie Perkins, Sr.	Dem	Greenwood
33	Thomas Reynolds II	Dem	Charleston
34	Linda Whittington	Dem	Schlater
35	Joey Hood	Rep	Ackerman
36	Karl Gibbs	Dem	West Point
37	Gary Chism	Rep	Columbus
38	Tyrone Ellis	Dem	Starkville
39	Jeff Smith	Rep	Columbus
40	Pat Nelson	Rep	Southaven
41	Vacant		
42	Reecy Dickson	Dem	Macon
43	Michael Evans	Dem	Philadelphia
44	C. Scott Bounds	Rep	Philadelphia
45	Jay Mathis	Rep	Carthage
46	Bobby Howell	Rep	Kilmichael
47	Bryant Clark	Dem	Pickens
48	Jason White	Rep	West
49	Willie Bailey	Dem	Greenville
50	John Hines	Dem	Greenville
51	Rufus Straughter	Dem	Belzoni
52	Bill Kinkade	Rep	Byhalia
53	Robert Moak	Dem	Bogue Chitto
54	Alex Monsour	Rep	Vicksburg
55	Oscar Denton	Dem	Vicksburg
56	Philip Gunn	Rep	Clinton
57	Edward Blackmon, Jr.	Dem	Canton
58	Rita Martinson	Rep	Madison
59	Brent Powell	Rep	Brandon
60	John Moore	Rep	Brandon
61	Ray Rogers	Rep	Pearl
62	Thomas Weathersby, Sr.	Rep	Florence
63	Deborah Butler Dixon	Dem	Raymond
64	William Denny, Jr.	Rep	Jackson
65	Mary Coleman	Dem	Jackson
66	Cecil Brown	Dem	Jackson
67	Earle S. Banks	Dem	Jackson
68	Credell Calhoun	Dem	Jackson
69	Alyce Clarke	Dem	Jackson
70	James Evans	Dem	Jackson
71	Adrienne Wooten	Dem	Canton
72	Kimberly Campbell Buck	Dem	Jackson
73	Brad Oberhousen	Dem	Jackson
74	Mark Baker	Rep	Brandon
75	Tom Miles	Dem	Forest
76	Gregory Holloway, Sr.	Dem	Hazlehurst
77	J. Andrew Gipson	Rep	Braxton
78	Randy Rushing	Rep	Decatur
79	Blaine Eaton II	Dem	Taylorsville
80	Omeria Scott	Dem	Laurel
81	Stephen Horne	Rep	Meridian
82	Charles Young, Jr.	Dem	Meridian
83	Greg Snowden	Rep	Meridian
84	William Shirley	Rep	Quitman
85	Chuck Middleton	Dem	Port Gibson
86	Sherra Lane	Dem	Waynesboro
87	Johnny Stringer	Dem	Montrose
88	Gary Staples	Rep	Laurel
89	Bobby Shows	Rep	Ellisville
90	Joseph Warren	Dem	Mount Olive
91	Robert Evans	Dem	Monticello
92	Becky Currie	Rep	Brookhaven
93	Timmy Ladner	Rep	Poplarville
94	Robert Johnson III	Dem	Natchez
95	Patricia H. Willis	Rep	Diamondhead
96	Angela Cockerham	Dem	Magnolia
97	Sam Mims, V	Rep	McComb
98	David Myers	Dem	McComb
99	Bill Pigott	Rep	Tylertown
100	Ken Morgan	Rep	Morgantown
101	Hank Lott	Rep	Sumrall
102	Toby Barker	Rep	Hattiesburg
103	Percy Watson	Dem	Hattiesburg
104	Larry Byrd	Rep	Petal
105	Dennis DeBar	Rep	
106	Herbert Frierson	Rep	Poplarville
107	Doug McLeod	Rep	
108	Mark Formby	Rep	Picayune
109	Manly Barton	Rep	
110	Jeramey Anderson	Dem	Moss Point
111	Charles Busby	Rep	Pascagoula
112	John Read	Rep	Gautier
113	Henry Zuber III	Rep	Ocean Springs
114	Jeffrey S. Guice	Rep	Ocean Springs
115	Randall Patterson	Rep	Biloxi
116	Casey Eure	Rep	Biloxi
117	Scott DeLano	Rep	Biloxi
118	Greg Haney	Rep	Gulfport
119	Sonya Williams-Barnes	Dem	Gulfport
120	Richard Bennett	Rep	Long Beach
121	Carolyn Crawford	Rep	Pass Christian
122	David Baria	Dem	Bay St. Louis

With the February 2009 party switch of Billy Nicholson from Democrat to Republican, the composition became 73 Democrats and 49 Republicans. This also meant that for the first time in the history of Mississippi, the majority of the Democratic members of the House were African-Americans.
