= Brady Williamson =

American politician

Member of the Mississippi House of Representatives from the 10th district
- In office January 7, 2020 – January 2, 2024
- Preceded by: Nolan Mettetal
- Succeeded by: Josh Hawkins

Personal details
- Born: December 29, 1976 (age 49) Jackson, Mississippi, U.S.
- Party: Republican

Brady Williamson (born December 29, 1976) is an American politician who served in the Mississippi House of Representatives from the 10th district from 2020 to 2024.
