= William Kinkade =

William Kinkade can refer to:

- Thomas Kinkade (1958–2012), American painter and businessman
- Bill Kinkade (born 1957), Mississippi politician
