= Lynn Wright =

American politician (1952–2022)

Member of the Mississippi House of Representatives from the 37th district
- In office January 2020 – June 17, 2022
- Preceded by: Gary A. Chism
- Succeeded by: Andy Boyd

Personal details
- Born: July 22, 1952
- Died: June 17, 2022 (aged 69) Tuscaloosa, Alabama, U.S.
- Party: Republican

Joseph Lynn Wright (July 22, 1952 – June 17, 2022) was an American politician.

Wright was born in Columbus, Mississippi. He served in the Mississippi House of Representatives from 2020 until his death in 2022 from amyotrophic lateral sclerosis and was a Republican. He died in Tuscaloosa, Alabama.
