= Clara Burnett =

American Democratic politician

Member of the Mississippi House of Representatives from the 9th district
- In office 2004–2016
- Succeeded by: Cedric Burnett

Personal details
- Born: August 28, 1941 (age 84) Tunica, Mississippi, U.S.
- Party: Democratic

Clara Burnett (born August 28, 1941) is an American Democratic politician. She served as a member of the Mississippi House of Representatives from the 9th District from 2004 to 2015.
