= J. P. Scales =

Mississippi politician

29th Speaker of the Mississippi House of Representatives

Member of the Mississippi House of Representatives
- In office November 5, 1861 – January 29, 1862
- Preceded by: William A. Lake
- Succeeded by: Lock E. Houston

Member of the Mississippi House of Representatives from the Carroll County district
- In office November 7, 1859 – 1863

Personal details
- Born: 1830 or 1831 North Carolina, U.S.
- Died: 1866 (aged 35–36)
- Party: Democratic

James Pinckney Scales (1830/31 – 1866) was a lawyer and state legislator in Mississippi. He served in the Mississippi House of Representatives including as the 29th Speaker of the House. He was from a prominent family. He was a Confederate officer during the American Civil War.

He was born in North Carolina. He was one of seven sons and three daughters of Robert Scales. James graduated from the University of North Carolina in 1849. He served as an officer in the Confederate Army during the American Civil War alongside many of his brothers, including Colonel Alfred Scales.

He lived in Carrollton, Mississippi. In September 1858 he received the Democratic nomination to fill a vacancy for Carroll County in the Mississippi House of Representatives. He served that term from November 7, 1859 to February 11, 1860. He was re-elected and served between 1860 and 1861. He served in a third session beginning on November 5, 1861 at age 30. He was elected Speaker on the first day of the session aged 30 or 31. He wrote to governor John J. Pettus on November 25, 1862.

Scales died in 1866 and was buried on April 2, 1866, in Evergreen Cemetery.

Scales married Kate Lewis on April 24, 1860. He was widowed before 1861. He remarried before his death, and his second wife survived him alongside two children.
