= Jimmy Fondren =

American politician

Member of the Mississippi House of Representatives from the 111th district
- Incumbent
- Assumed office January 2, 2024
- Preceded by: Charles Busby

Personal details
- Born: August 6, 1997 (age 29)
- Party: Republican
- Education: Millsaps College (BA); University of Mississippi
- Occupation: Politician
- Profession: Attorney

Jimmy Fondren serves as a member of the Mississippi House of Representatives for the 111th District, affiliating with the Republican Party, a position he has held since 2024.
