= Mark Baker (Mississippi politician) =

American politician

Member of the Mississippi House of Representatives from the 74th district
- In office January 6, 2004 – January 7, 2020
- Preceded by: Keith Montgomery
- Succeeded by: Lee Yancey

Personal details
- Born: May 13, 1962 (age 64) Chicago, Illinois, U.S.
- Party: Republican

Mark Baker (born May 13, 1962) is an American politician who served as a member of the Mississippi House of Representatives from the 74th District from 2003 to 2020. He is a member of the Republican party. In 2018, Baker announced his candidacy for Attorney General of Mississippi in the 2019 elections. He came in third place in the race.
