= Kenneth Walker (Mississippi politician) =

American politician (born 1953)

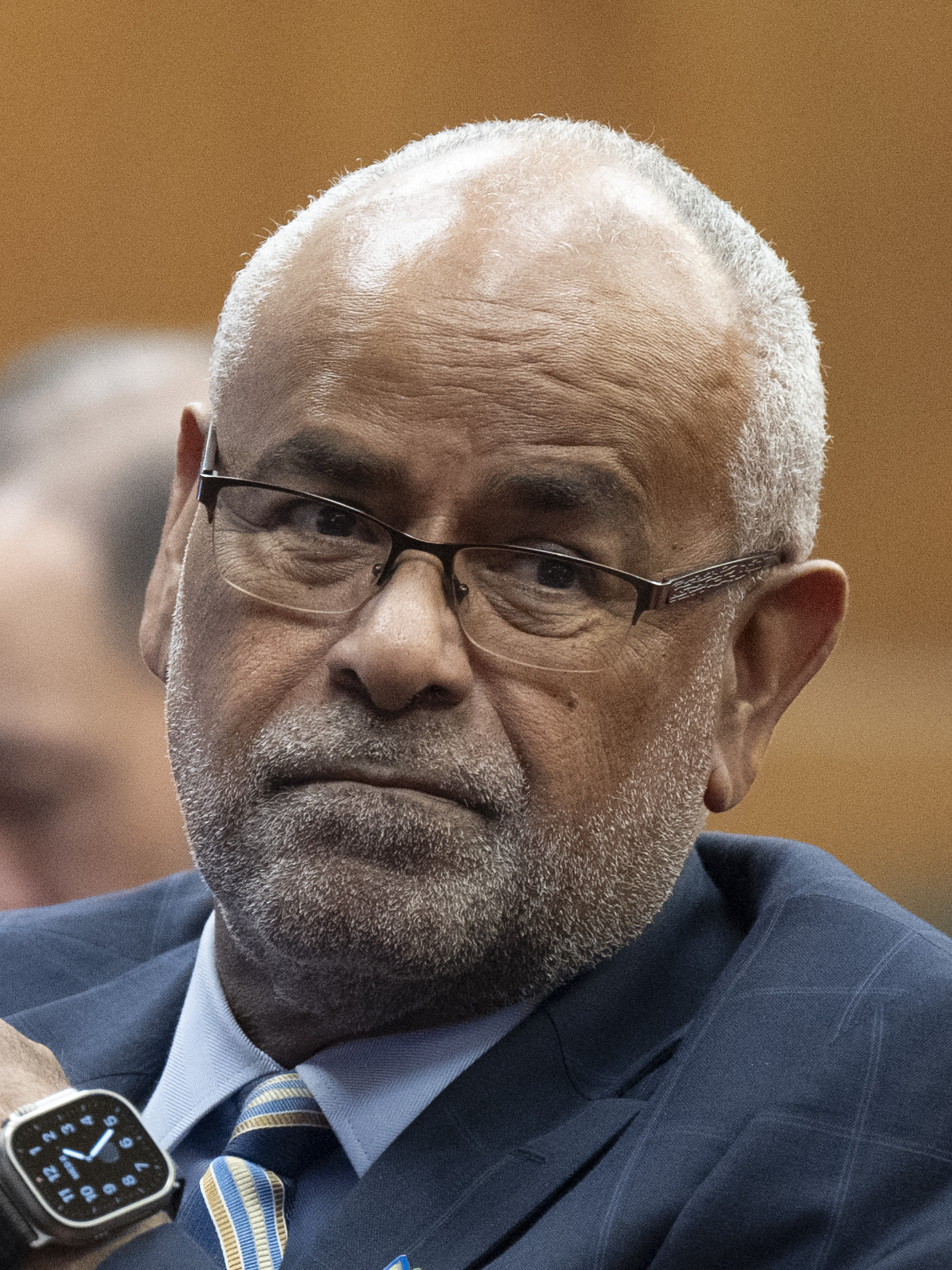
- Walker in 2023

Member of the Mississippi House of Representatives from the 27th district
- In office January 2016 – April 2023
- Succeeded by: Kenji Holloway

Personal details
- Born: January 11, 1953 (age 73) Carthage, Mississippi, U.S.
- Party: Democratic

Kenneth Walker (born January 11, 1953) is an American project manager and Democratic politician. He is a former member of the Mississippi House of Representatives, having represented the 27th district from 2016 to 2023.

== Biography ==
Kenneth Walker was born on January 11, 1953, in Carthage, Mississippi. He received B. S. and M. S. degrees from Jackson State University. In 2015, he was elected to represent the 27th district in the Mississippi House of Representatives. He was re-elected in 2019. Walker resigned in 2023 after being appointed to a position in the Natural Resources Conservation Service of the U.S. Department of Agriculture.
