= Linda F. Coleman =

American lawyer, judge, and politician from Mississippi

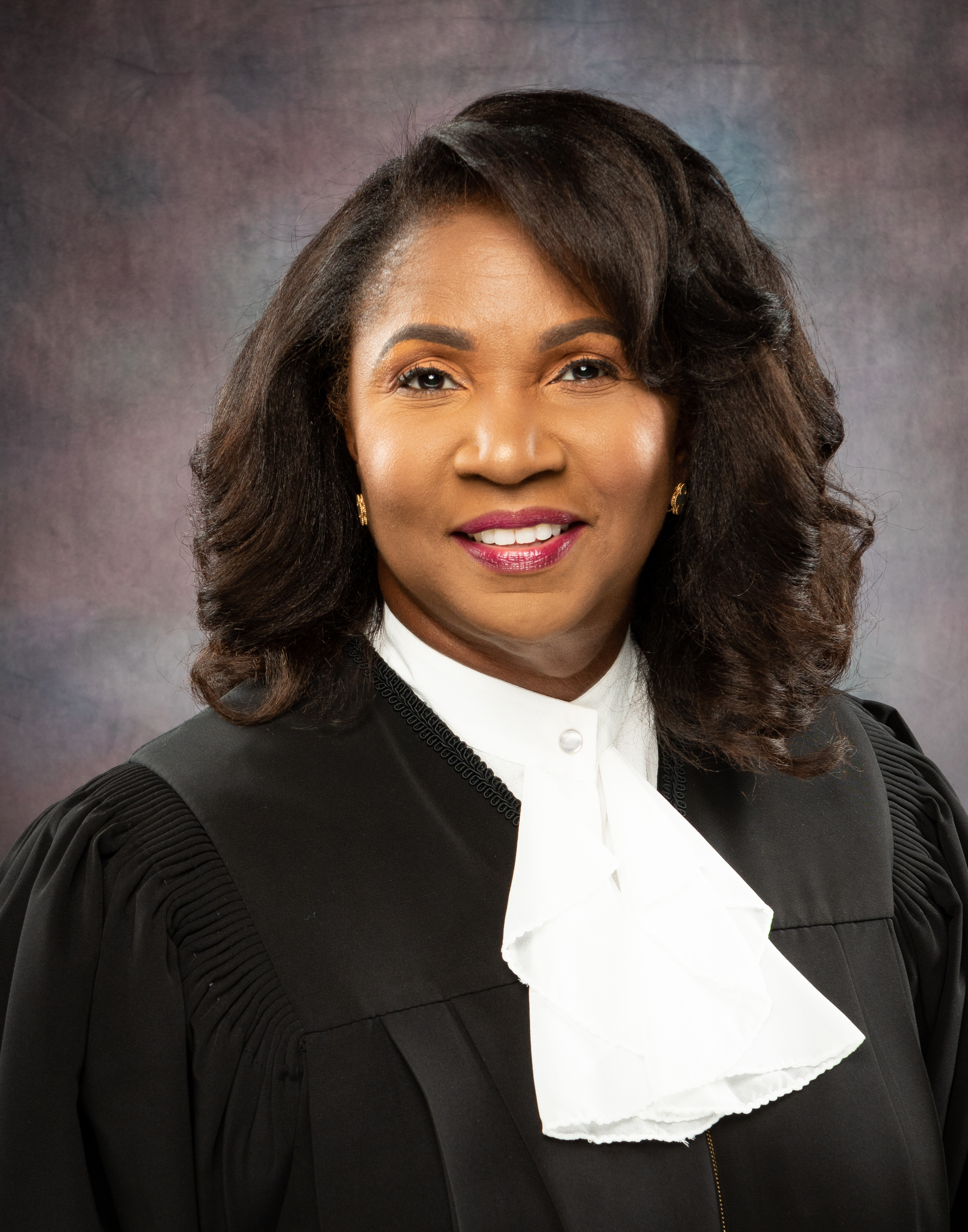
Judge Linda F. Coleman of Mississippi's Eleventh Circuit Court District

Linda F. Coleman (born September 27, 1961) is an American judge, attorney, and former lawmaker from the state of Mississippi. She has served as Circuit Court Judge of Mississippi's Eleventh Circuit Court District since 2016.

== Early life and education ==
The seventh of eight children, Coleman received her early education in the public schools of the historically all-Black town of Mound Bayou, Mississippi. She earned a bachelor's degree in public administration from the University of Mississippi and a Juris Doctor degree from Mississippi College School of Law.

== Career ==
=== North Mississippi Rural Legal Services and Private Practice ===
Coleman was admitted to the Mississippi Bar in 1987 and began her first legal job as a staff attorney for North Mississippi Rural Legal Services (NMRLS) in Clarksdale, Mississippi, providing free services to low-income clients. By 1989, she became managing attorney for NMRLS and served in that role until 1994. She subsequently established her own private law practice, representing the Mississippi towns of Mound Bayou, Coahoma, and Friars Point, and served as attorney for the Bolivar County Board of Supervisors and the Mound Bayou School Board.

=== Mississippi House of Representatives ===
Coleman was elected as a Democratic representative for District 29 in the Mississippi House of Representatives in November 1991, defeating a 17-year incumbent, Edward G. "Ed" Jackson. In 1991, only two Black women held seats in the 122-member Mississippi House of Representatives, which included only eight women of any race. That year, Coleman became the third Black woman elected to the Mississippi House of Representatives. She assumed office in 1992 and was re-elected that same year during a special election held to address reapportionment. She was subsequently re-elected to six four-year terms. She served only a portion of her final term before accepting a judicial appointment. During her 25 sessions in the state legislature, Coleman held several leadership positions, including Vice Chairman of the Penitentiary Committee in her first term, Vice Chairman of the Tourism Committee in her fourth term in 2004, Chairman of the House Committee on Fees and Salaries of Public Officers from 2006 to 2012, and Vice Chairman of the Corrections Committee, the successor committee to the former Penitentiary Committee. Her other committee assignments included Appropriations; Corrections; County Affairs; Education; Fees and Salaries of Public Officers; Investigate State Offices; Judiciary A; Judiciary En Banc; Management; Municipalities; Penitentiary; Ports, Harbors and Airports; Public Buildings, Grounds and Lands (now Public Property); Select Committee on Poverty; Tourism; Transportation; and Ways and Means.

In 2008, Coleman cast a historic deciding vote that elected William J. "Billy" McCoy to become Speaker of the Mississippi House of Representatives, a move that "proved to be worth forty chairmanships or vice-chairmanships, further placing African Americans in powerful positions in the state legislature."

On February 21, 2008, she became the first woman to preside as Acting Speaker while the Mississippi House of Representatives was in session. She served in that temporary role on multiple occasions during her legislative career.

=== Mississippi's Eleventh Circuit Court ===
In March 2016, Mississippi Governor Phil Bryant appointed Coleman as Circuit Court Judge to fill a vacancy on the state's 11th Circuit Court District, which encompasses the counties of Bolivar, Coahoma, Quitman, and Tunica. During a special election in November 2016, she ran unopposed and was elected to continue in the non-partisan role on the bench. She has since won re-election to two four-year terms in 2018 and 2022. In February 2026, Coleman announced that she would retire on December 31, 2026.

=== Honors and Recognition ===
Coleman was named a Fellow of the Mississippi Bar Foundation in April 2019. In 2026, Mississippi Trailblazers honored her with the Dr. Cindy Ayers Elliot Legacy Award.

== Personal life ==
Coleman is a longtime member of Pleasant Green Missionary Baptist Church in Mound Bayou.
