= Adrienne Wooten =

American politician

Member of the Mississippi House of Representatives from the 71st district
- In office 2008–2019
- Succeeded by: Ronnie Crudup Jr.

Personal details
- Born: March 7, 1974 (age 52) Riverside, California, U.S.
- Party: Democratic

Adrienne Wooten (born March 7, 1974) is an American politician who served as member of the Mississippi House of Representatives for the 71st district from 2008 to 2019.
