= Herbert Frierson =

American politician

Member of the Mississippi House of Representatives from the 106th district
- In office 1992–2016
- Succeeded by: John Glen Corley

Personal details
- Born: July 19, 1958 (age 68) Jackson, Mississippi, United States
- Party: Republican

Herbert Frierson (born July 19, 1958) is an American politician. He was a member of the Mississippi House of Representatives from the 106th District, being first elected in 1991 and resigning June 30, 2016, upon his appointment as Commissioner of the Mississippi Department of Revenue. He is a member of the Republican party.
