= Kevin Felsher =

American politician (born 1975)

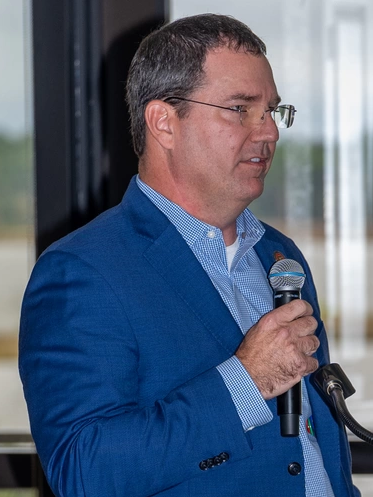

Member of the Mississippi House of Representatives from the 117th district
- Incumbent
- Assumed office January 7, 2020
- Preceded by: Scott DeLano

Personal details
- Born: October 10, 1975 (age 50) Biloxi, Mississippi, U.S.
- Party: Republican
- Spouse: Crystal
- Children: 2
- Education: University of Southern Mississippi (BS)

Kevin W. Felsher (born October 10, 1975) is an American politician serving as a member of the Mississippi House of Representatives from the 117th district. Elected in November 2019, he assumed office on January 7, 2020.

== Early life and education ==
Felsher was born in Biloxi, Mississippi in 1975. He earned a Bachelor of Science degree in sports coaching and administration from the University of Southern Mississippi.

== Career ==
Since 2006, Felsher has worked as a commercial real estate broker with Coldwell Banker. He is also a principal at the Strategic Alliance Group of Mississippi. Felsher was elected to the Mississippi House of Representatives in November 2019 and assumed office on January 7, 2020. In January 2022, Felsher proposed HB 997, which would legalize online betting on sports games in Mississippi.
