= Josh Hawkins (politician) =

American politician

Member of the Mississippi House of Representatives from the 10th district
- Incumbent
- Assumed office January 2, 2024

Personal details
- Party: Republican

Josh Hawkins is a Republican member of the Mississippi House of Representatives, representing the Tenth District of Mississippi since 2024.
