= Preston Sullivan =

American politician

Member of the Mississippi House of Representatives from the 22nd district
- In office January 3, 2004 – January 2020
- Preceded by: William E. Bowles
- Succeeded by: Jon Ray Lancaster

Personal details
- Born: June 8, 1947 (age 79) Tupelo, Mississippi, United States
- Profession: Farmer

Preston E. Sullivan (born June 8, 1947) is an American Democratic politician. He is a former member of the Mississippi House of Representatives from the 22nd District. He served for four terms from 2004 to 2020 and did not run again in 2019.
