= Brent Anderson (Mississippi politician) =

American politician (born 1972)

Member of the Mississippi House of Representatives from the 122nd district
- Incumbent
- Assumed office January 7, 2020
- Preceded by: David Baria

Personal details
- Born: October 17, 1972 (age 53) Gulfport, Mississippi, U.S.
- Party: Republican

Brent Anderson (born October 17, 1972) is an American politician serving as a member of the Mississippi House of Representatives from the 122nd district. Elected in November 2019, he assumed office on January 7, 2020.

== Early life and education ==
Anderson was born in Gulfport, Mississippi in 1972. After graduating from Bay High School, he attended the Mississippi Fire Academy and Mississippi Law Enforcement Officers Training Academy. He also completed a program through the Mississippi State Department of Health.

== Career ==
Prior to entering politics, Anderson worked for the Waveland Police Department and Bay Saint Louis Fire Department. He has since worked as the public works director, building official, and federal recovery manager for the city of Waveland, Mississippi. Anderson was elected to the Mississippi House of Representatives in November 2019 and assumed office on January 7, 2020. During the 2020–2021 legislative session, Anderson served as vice chair of the House Public Utilities Committee and chair of the House Municipalities Committee. In December 2021, Anderson co-founded the Mississippi Legislative First Responders Caucus.
