= Kent McCarty =

American politician from the state of Mississippi

Member of the Mississippi House of Representatives from the 101st district
- Incumbent
- Assumed office April 5, 2019
- Preceded by: Brad Touchstone

Personal details
- Born: Kenneth Martin McCarty; January 24, 1993 (age 33) Hattiesburg, Mississippi, U.S.
- Party: Republican
- Education: University of Southern Mississippi (BA)
- Occupation: Politician, Business Owner

Kent McCarty (born January 24, 1993) is an American business owner and politician, representing the 101st District in the Mississippi House of Representatives since 2019.

== Early life and education ==
McCarty was born on January 24, 1993, in Hattiesburg, Mississippi and attended Oak Grove High School. Afterwards, he enrolled at the University of Southern Mississippi, where he graduated with a bachelor's degree in finance. While in college, McCarty started Java Moe's Coffee Company and now operates a chain of five locations in Mississippi.

== Career ==
McCarty first ran in the special election to replace former Representative Brad Touchstone, who resigned to take a seat on the Lamar County Court. McCarty placed first in a field of five candidates in the first special election on March 12, 2019, and then went on to win the runoff special election with 68% of the vote on April 2, 2019. McCarty won the August 6, 2019 Republican Primary with 84.8% of the vote.

He was sworn into office on April 5, 2019.

For the 2021 House session, McCarty serves as Vice Chairman of the House Education Committee and also serves on the following House Committees: Accountability, Efficiency, Transparency; Banking and Financial Services; Conservation and Water Resources; Universities and Colleges.

== Political positions ==
During the 2019 election, McCarty campaigned on supporting public education and growing the economy by supporting small businesses.

In 2020, McCarty voted yes on the bill to change the Mississippi State Flag.
