= Margaret Rogers (politician) =

American politician (born 1949)

Member of the Mississippi House of Representatives from the 14th district
- In office January 3, 2004 – 2020

Personal details
- Born: Margaret Ellis Rogers; January 22, 1949 (age 77) Oxford, Mississippi, U.S.
- Party: Democratic (before 2010); Republican (2010-present)
- Profession: Accountant

Margaret Ellis Rogers (born January 22, 1949) is an American accountant and former politician. She served as a member of the Mississippi House of Representatives from the 14th District, being first elected in 2003 and retiring in 2020.

She switched from being a Democrat to being a Republican.
