= Chuck Middleton =

American politician

America Chuck Middleton

Member of the Mississippi House of Representatives from the 85th district
- In office 1996–2018

Personal details
- Born: December 10, 1959 (age 66) Natchez, Mississippi, United States
- Party: Democratic

America Chuck Middleton (born December 10, 1959) is an American politician. He was a member of the Mississippi House of Representatives from the 85th District, being first elected in 1995 and serving until 2018. He is a Democrat.
