= Otis Anthony =

American politician

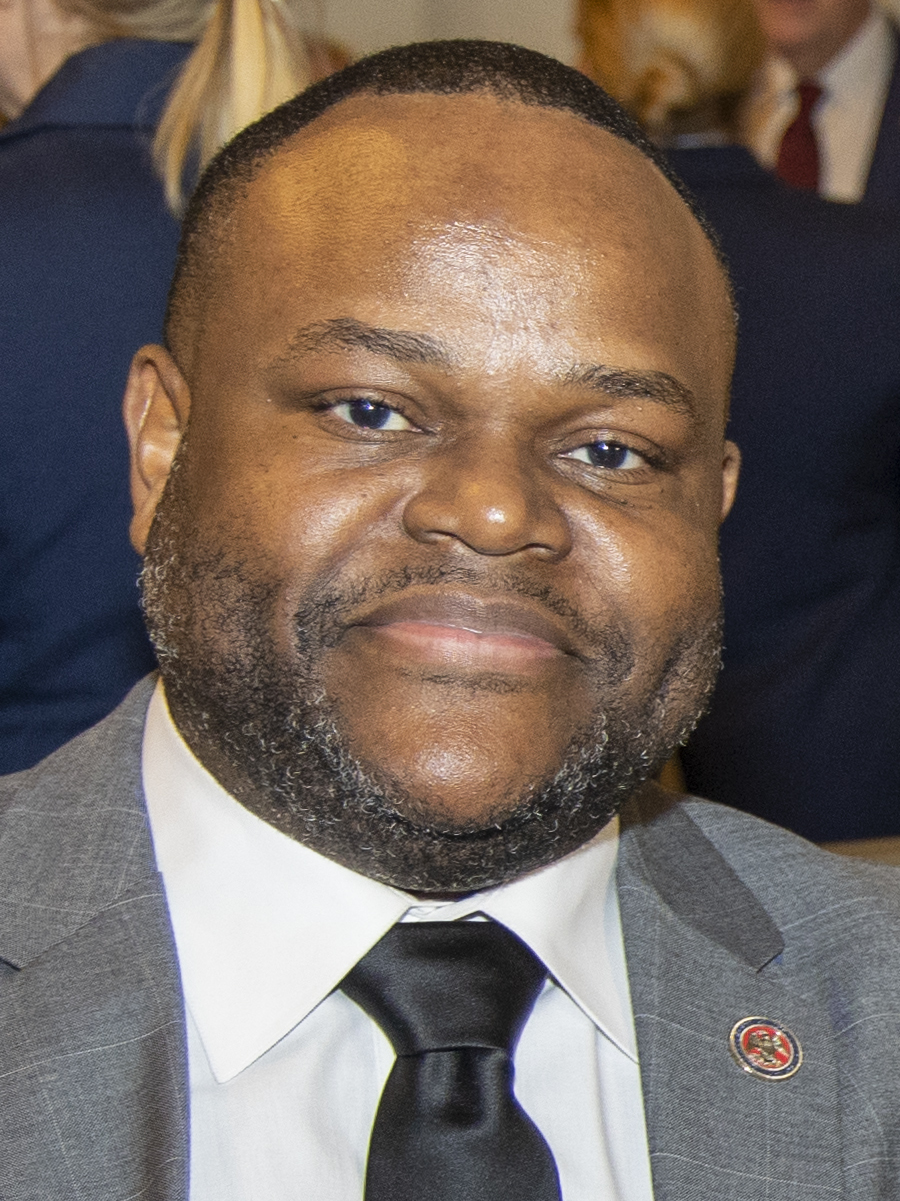

Member of the Mississippi House of Representatives from the 31st district
- Incumbent
- Assumed office December 13, 2018
- Preceded by: Sara R. Thomas

Personal details
- Born: July 12, 1979 (age 47) Indianola, Mississippi, U.S.
- Party: Democratic
- Children: 2
- Education: Tougaloo College (BA); Agape Bible College (BA)

Otis Anthony (born July 12, 1979) is an American politician serving as a member of the Mississippi House of Representatives from the 31st district. He assumed office on December 13, 2018.

== Early life and education ==
Anthony was born in Indianola, Mississippi. After graduating from Gentry High School, he earned a Bachelor of Arts degree in political science and pre-law from Tougaloo College and another Bachelor of Arts, in theology, from Agape Bible College.

== Career ==
Anthony owns Anthony and Company, LLC, a financial planning company. He is also a pastor. He was elected to the Mississippi House of Representatives in November 2018 and assumed office on December 13, 2018. During his tenure in the House, Anthony has served as vice chair of the Youth and Family Affairs Committee.
