= Dana McLean =

American lawyer

Member of the Mississippi House of Representatives from the 39th district
- Incumbent
- Assumed office January 7, 2020
- Preceded by: Jeff Smith

Personal details
- Born: Russellville, Alabama, U.S.
- Party: Republican
- Children: 1
- Education: University of Alabama (BA); Stetson University (JD, LLM)

Dana Underwood McLean is an American attorney, real estate agent, and politician serving as a member of the Mississippi House of Representatives from the 39th district. Elected in November 2019, she assumed office on January 7, 2020.

== Early life and education ==
Born in Russellville, Alabama, McLean was raised in Lowndes County, Mississippi and attended Stephen D. Lee High School in Columbus, Mississippi. She earned a Bachelor of Arts degree in French and international studies from the University of Alabama, followed by a Juris Doctor and Master of Laws in international law and business from the Stetson University College of Law.

== Career ==
McLean practiced law in Tampa, Florida before returning to Columbus to work as a realtor for Century 21. She was elected to the Mississippi House of Representatives in November 2019 and assumed office on January 7, 2020.
