= John Moore (Mississippi politician) =

American politician

- Moore in 2007

Member of the Mississippi House of Representatives from the 60th district
- In office 1996–2017

Personal details
- Born: August 19, 1954 (age 72) Pelahatchie, Mississippi, United States
- Party: Republican

John L. Moore (born August 19, 1954) is an American politician. He was a member of the Mississippi House of Representatives from the 60th District, being first elected in 1995. He is a member of the Republican party.

Moore resigned from the legislature on December 8, 2017, in the wake of multiple allegations of sexual harassment made by multiple women.
