= Price Wallace =

American politician (1961–2026)

Member of the Mississippi House of Representatives from the 77th district
- In office 2018 – June 3, 2026
- Preceded by: Andy Gipson

Personal details
- Born: November 24, 1961 Jackson, Mississippi, U.S.
- Died: June 3, 2026 (aged 64) Mendenhall, Mississippi, U.S.
- Party: Republican
- Spouse: Cindy Stevenson
- Profession: Farmer

James Price Wallace (November 24, 1961 – June 3, 2026) was an American politician. He was a member of the Mississippi House of Representatives from the 77th District, being first elected in 2018 and helmed the position until his death in 2026. He was a member of the Republican Party.

In a November 7, 2020, tweet from his official Twitter account, in response to the victory of Joe Biden in the 2020 United States presidential election, Wallace called for the state of Mississippi to "succeed [sic] from the union and form our own country." This tweet was later deleted, and Wallace apologized for posting it.

Wallace died at his home in Mendenhall, Mississippi, on June 3, 2026, at the age of 64.
