= Jill Ford =

American politician and businesswoman (born 1964)

Member of the Mississippi House of Representatives from the 73rd district
- Incumbent
- Assumed office January 7, 2020
- Preceded by: Cory T. Wilson

Personal details
- Born: February 18, 1964 (age 62)
- Party: Republican
- Spouse: Mike Ford
- Children: 2
- Education: Northeast Mississippi Community College (AS)

Jill Ford (born February 18, 1964) is an American politician and businesswoman serving as a member of the Mississippi House of Representatives from the 73rd district. Elected in November 2019, she assumed office on January 7, 2020.

== Education ==
Ford earned an Associate of Science degree in paralegal studies from Northeast Mississippi Community College and attended Mississippi State University. She left Mississippi State to recover from surgery and did not earn a bachelor's degree.

== Career ==
Ford began her career as a paralegal at Butler Snow in Jackson, Mississippi. She started working as a real estate broker in 1993. She has also been a member of the board of Mississippi Blood Services and Partners in Christ. She was elected to the Mississippi House of Representatives in November 2019 and assumed office on January 7, 2020.
