= Troy Smith (politician) =

American politician

Member of the Mississippi House of Representatives from the 84th district
- Incumbent
- Assumed office January 7, 2020
- Preceded by: William Shirley

Personal details
- Born: Troy Moss Smith; June 29, 1965 (age 61)
- Party: Republican
- Spouse: Michell Ballard

Troy Moss Smith (born June 29, 1965) is an American politician and businessman serving as a member of the Mississippi House of Representatives from the 84th district. He assumed office on January 7, 2020.

== Education ==
Smith graduated from Quitman High School in Quitman, Mississippi and attended Jones County Junior College.

== Career ==
Outside of politics, Smith owns Long's Fish Camp, a seafood restaurant in Enterprise, Clarke County, Mississippi. He also represented the third district on the Clark County Board of Supervisors. He was elected to the Mississippi House of Representatives in January 2020.
