= Brad Touchstone =

Judge former legislator

Brad Ashley Touchstone

Judge of the 15th Circuit Court District of Mississippi
- Incumbent
- Assumed office January 1, 2023
- Appointed by: Tate Reeves

County Court Judge of Lamar County
- In office January 1, 2019 – December 31, 2022

Member of the Mississippi House of Representatives from the 101st district
- In office January 1, 2016 – December 31, 2018

County Prosecuting Attorney of Lamar County
- In office January 1, 2011 – December 31, 2015

Personal details
- Born: September 19, 1979 (age 47) Hattiesburg, Mississippi, U.S.
- Party: Republican
- Spouse: Janice Burke Touchstone

Brad Ashley Touchstone (born September 19, 1979) is an American attorney, jurist, and former state legislator from Mississippi. He serves as a judge of the 15th Circuit Court District, which includes Lamar, Pearl River, Marion, and Walthall counties. Touchstone previously served as County Prosecuting Attorney of Lamar County, in the Mississippi House of Representatives, and as County Court Judge of Lamar County.

== Early life and education ==
Touchstone was born in Hattiesburg, Mississippi, and raised in Lamar County. He is a descendant of the Touchstone family that settled in the South Mississippi Pine Belt region in the 19th century. Touchstone is related to former Mississippi Lieutenant Governor Evelyn Gandy through the Touchstone family line.

Touchstone earned an A.A. from Pearl River Community College, a B.B.A. and M.B.A. from Millsaps College, and a J.D. from the Mississippi College School of Law.

== Legal and early public career ==
Touchstone began practicing law in 2009 in Hattiesburg, focusing on civil litigation and insurance defense.

He was appointed County Prosecuting Attorney for Lamar County in December 2010 by the Lamar County Board of Supervisors. He won election to the office in 2011 and served through 2015.

Touchstone also served as City Attorney for Lumberton and as a public defender in the Lamar County Justice Court.

== Legislative career ==
In January 2015, Touchstone announced his candidacy for the Mississippi House of Representatives while serving as County Prosecuting Attorney. He was elected without opposition to represent District 101 as a Republican and served from 2016 to 2018.

== Judicial career ==
=== County Court Judge (2019–2022) ===
Touchstone was elected County Court Judge for Lamar County in 2018 and took office on January 1, 2019. His duties included civil matters, youth court cases, and preliminary felony proceedings.

=== Circuit Court Judge (2023–present) ===
On December 22, 2022, Governor Tate Reeves appointed Touchstone to the 15th Circuit Court District. His term began on January 1, 2023, and his investiture was held on January 27, 2023, at the Lamar County Courthouse.

Touchstone has presided over felony and civil matters that have been reported in statewide news media. In 2024, he handled the state's first conviction under Parker's Law for the sale of fentanyl resulting in death.

== State commissions and public service ==
Touchstone serves on the Mississippi Commission on Children's Justice, appointed in 2021 by the Mississippi Supreme Court. He also serves on the Mississippi Opioid Settlement Advisory Council, which evaluates statewide opioid-abatement funding applications. In 2023, he was elected chair of the Commission on a Uniform Youth Court System and Procedures.

== Personal life ==
Touchstone lives in Lamar County with his family. His wife, Janice Burke Touchstone, is a dentist.

== Electoral history ==
=== County Prosecuting Attorney ===
- 2011 – Elected County Prosecuting Attorney for Lamar County.

=== Mississippi House of Representatives ===
- 2015 – Elected without opposition to House District 101.

=== County Court Judge ===
- 2018 – Elected County Court Judge for Lamar County.

=== Circuit Court Judge ===
- 2023 – Unopposed in special election for the 15th Circuit Court District.
