= Andy Boyd =

American politician

Member of the Mississippi House of Representatives from the 37th district
- Incumbent
- Assumed office November 22, 2022
- Preceded by: Lynn Wright

Personal details
- Born: June 26, 1957 (age 69) Columbus, Mississippi
- Party: Republican
- Spouse: Sherry Lee Boyd
- Education: Mississippi State University (BS)
- Occupation: Politician

Andy Boyd serves as a member of the Mississippi House of Representatives for the 37th District, affiliating with the Republican Party, a position he has held since 2022.
