= Alex Monsour =

American politician

Member of the Mississippi House of Representatives from the 54th district
- In office January 3, 2008 – July 2, 2017
- Succeeded by: Kevin Ford

Personal details
- Born: May 5, 1962 (age 64) Lake Charles, Louisiana, U.S.
- Party: Republican
- Children: Zane Monsour, Kennedy Monsour Maynord

Alex Monsour (born May 5, 1962) is an American politician in the U.S. state of Mississippi. From 2008 to 2017, he represented the 54th district in the Mississippi House of Representatives. He resigned on July 2, 2017, to become the South Ward alderman for the city of Vicksburg, Mississippi. He has served in the role since 2017.

He is a native of Lake Charles, Louisiana.
