= Zakiya Summers =

American politician (born 1983)

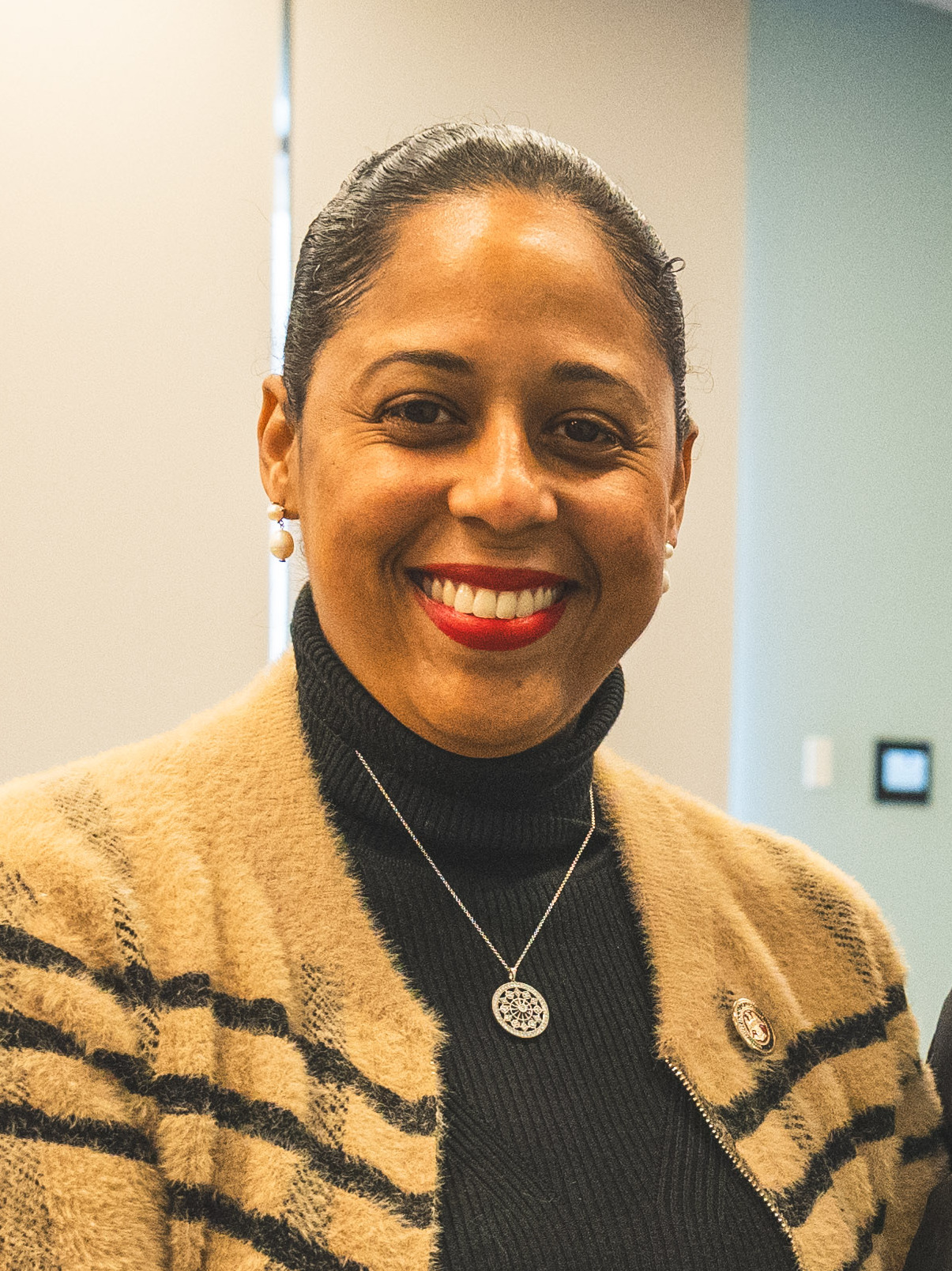
- Summers in 2024

Member of the Mississippi House of Representatives from the 68th district
- Incumbent
- Assumed office January 7, 2020
- Preceded by: Credell Calhoun

Personal details
- Born: January 14, 1983 (age 43) Houston, Texas, U.S.
- Party: Democratic
- Spouse: Andra Harlee
- Children: 3
- Education: University of Missouri (BA)

Zakiya Summers (born January 14, 1983) is an American politician and former journalist serving as a member of the Mississippi House of Representatives from the 68th district. She assumed office on January 7, 2020.

== Early life and education ==
Summers was born on January 14, 1983, in Houston, Texas, and has lived in Jackson, Mississippi for most of her life. She graduated with the International Baccalaureate Diploma from Jim Hill High School. She earned a Bachelor of Arts degree in journalism from the Missouri School of Journalism in 2005.

== Career ==
Summers returned to Mississippi to work as a producer for WLBT TV. She later worked as a public relations manager for the Jackson Medical Mall Foundation. Since 2015, she worked as the director of communications and advocacy at the ACLU of Mississippi until she ran for State Representative.

Summers was elected as Hinds County District 3 Election Commissioner in 2016, and later to the Mississippi House of Representatives assuming office on January 7, 2020.
