= Sam Creekmore IV =

American politician

Member of the Mississippi House of Representatives from the 14th district
- Incumbent
- Assumed office January 7, 2020

Personal details
- Born: September 24, 1966 Starkville, Mississippi, U.S.
- Party: Republican

Samuel J. Creekmore IV (born September 24, 1966) is an American landscape architect and Republican politician. He is a member of the Mississippi House of Representatives, having represented the state's 14th district there since 2020.

== Biography ==
Samuel J. Creekmore IV was born on September 24, 1966, in Starkville, Mississippi. Creekmore graduated from Mississippi State University. He is a landscape architect. A resident of New Albany, Mississippi, he was elected to represent Mississippi's 14th House district, composed of Union County, in the Mississippi House of Representatives as a Republican in 2019 and was inaugurated on January 7, 2020.

== Personal life ==
Creekmore is married to his wife, the former Warner Poindexter. Her uncle, Will Green Poindexter, represented Sunflower County in the Mississippi House of Representatives from 1976 to 1993.
