= Gary Chism =

American Republican politician

Member of the Mississippi House of Representatives from the 37th district
- In office January 6, 2004 – June 30, 2020
- Preceded by: Rob Roberson
- Succeeded by: Lynn Wright

Member of the Mississippi House of Representatives from the 40th district
- In office January 4, 2000 – January 6, 2004
- Preceded by: Terry W. Brown
- Succeeded by: Ted Mayhall

Personal details
- Born: Gary Alan Chism; December 24, 1950 (age 75) Columbus, Mississippi, U.S.
- Party: Republican
- Spouse: Barbara Digby

Gary Alan Chism (born December 24, 1950) is an American Republican politician. He served as a member of the Mississippi House of Representatives under two districts: the 40th from 2000 to 2004 and the 37th from 2004 to 2020. Chism retired from the legislature on June 30, 2020.
