= Stephanie Foster (politician) =

American politician (born 1967)

Member of the Mississippi House of Representatives from the 63rd district
- Incumbent
- Assumed office January 7, 2020
- Preceded by: Deborah Butler Dixon

Personal details
- Born: March 8, 1967 (age 59)
- Party: Democratic

Stephanie McKenzie Foster (born March 8, 1967) is an American politician serving as a member of the Mississippi House of Representatives from the 63rd district. Elected in November 2019, she assumed office on January 7, 2020.

== Background ==
Foster was born on March 8, 1967, in Jackson, Mississippi. After graduating from Raymond High School, she attended Hinds Community College and Mississippi College. She was elected to the Mississippi House of Representatives in November 2019 and assumed office on January 7, 2020.
