= Michael Evans (politician) =

American politician

Member of the Mississippi House of Representatives from the 45th district
- In office January 5, 2016 – January 2, 2024
- Preceded by: Jay Mathis
- Succeeded by: Keith Jackson

Member of the Mississippi House of Representatives from the 43rd district
- In office January 3, 2012 – January 5, 2016
- Preceded by: Russ Nowell
- Succeeded by: Rob Roberson

Personal details
- Born: Michael Ted Evans; September 16, 1975 (age 50) Preston, Mississippi, U.S.
- Party: Independent (since 2020); Democratic (until 2020)
- Spouse: Heather Luke

Michael Ted Evans (born September 16, 1975) is an American politician. He is a former member of the Mississippi House of Representatives from the 45th District, being first elected in 2011 as a member of the Democratic party and serving till 2024.

In 2018, Evans ran for the United States House of Representatives from Mississippi's 3rd congressional district. He lost to Michael Guest.

In January 2020, he left the Democratic Party and became an independent.
