= Randall Patterson =

American politician

Member of the Mississippi House of Representatives from the 115th district
- In office January 6, 2004 – January 2, 2024
- Preceded by: Jamie Creel
- Succeeded by: Zachary Grady

Personal details
- Born: February 4, 1948 (age 78) Biloxi, Mississippi, U.S.
- Party: Republican (2014–present); Democratic (2003–2014)
- Spouse: Vickie Lackey
- Education: University of Southern Mississippi (BS); William Carey College (MEd)

Randall H. Patterson (born February 4, 1948) is an American politician. He is a former member of the Mississippi House of Representatives from the 115th District, being first elected in 2003 and serving till 2024. He is a member of the Republican party, after leaving the Democratic party in 2014.

== Committee assignments ==
=== 2023-2024 ===
Patterson was assigned to the following committees:

- Banking and Financial Services Committee
- House Energy Committee
- House Investigate State Offices Committee, Chair
- House Public Property Committee
- House Tourism Committee
- Ways and Means Committee

=== 2020-2021 ===
Patterson was assigned to the following committees:

- House Investigate State Offices Committee, Chairman
- House Public Property Committee
- House Tourism Committee
- Ways and Means Committee
- Banking and Financial Services Committee
- House Energy Committee

=== 2019-2020 ===
Patterson was assigned to the following committees:

- Investigate State Offices Committee, Chairman
- Enrolled Bills Committee
- Marine Resources Committee
- House Tourism Committee
- Ways and Means Committee
- Executive Contingent Fund Committee
