= Scott DeLano =

American politician

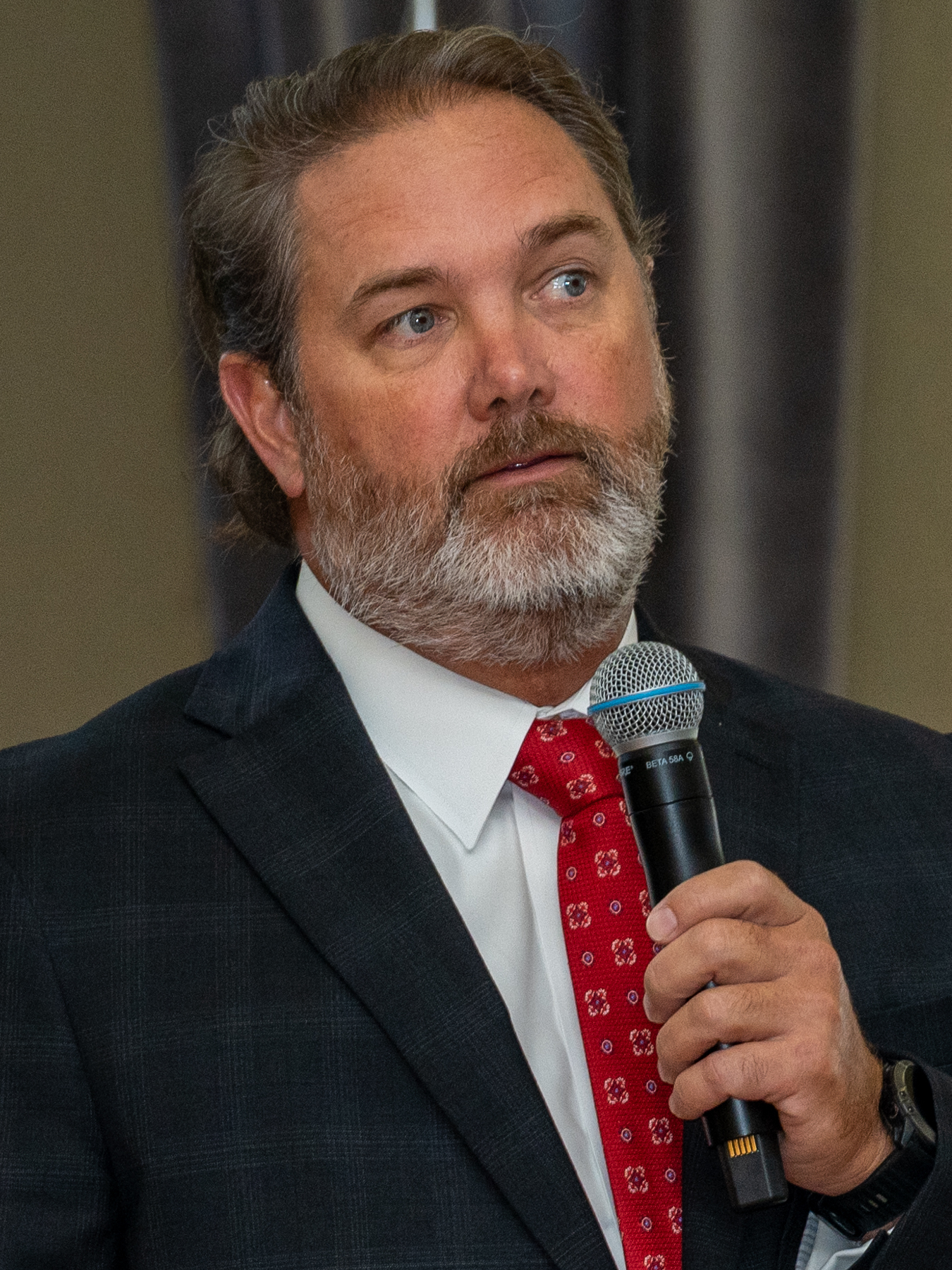
- DeLano at 2023 Mississippi Cyber Initiative Summit

Member of the Mississippi State Senate from the 50th district
- Incumbent
- Assumed office January 7, 2020
- Preceded by: Tommy Gollott

Member of the Mississippi House of Representatives from the 117th district
- In office November 18, 2009 – January 7, 2020
- Preceded by: Michael Janus
- Succeeded by: Kevin Felsher

Personal details
- Born: September 20, 1971 (age 54) Hendersonville, North Carolina, U.S.
- Party: Republican
- Education: University of Southern Mississippi (BA)

Scott DeLano (born September 20, 1971) is an American politician who has served in the Mississippi State Senate from the 50th district since 2020. He previously served in the Mississippi House of Representatives from the 117th district from 2009 to 2020.
