= Carl L. Mickens =

American politician

Member of the Mississippi House of Representatives from the 42nd district
- Incumbent
- Assumed office January 5, 2016
- Preceded by: Reecy L. Dickson

Personal details
- Born: August 2, 1960 (age 65) Noxubee County, Mississippi, U.S.
- Party: Democratic
- Spouse: Cheryl Richardson
- Profession: court clerk, funeral director

Carl Lewis Mickens (born August 2, 1960) is an American politician. He is a member of the Mississippi House of Representatives from the 42nd District, being first elected in 2015. He is a member of the Democratic party.
