= Kevin Ford (Mississippi politician) =

American politician and businessman

Member of the Mississippi House of Representatives from the 54th district
- Incumbent
- Assumed office January 2017
- Preceded by: Alex Monsour

Personal details
- Born: March 8, 1979 (age 47) Jackson, Mississippi, U.S.
- Party: Republican

Kevin Ford (born March 8, 1979) is an American politician and businessman serving as a member of the Mississippi House of Representatives from the 54th district. Elected in November 2016, he assumed office in January 2017.

== Early life and education ==
Ford was born in Jackson, Mississippi in 1979 and attended Warren Central High School in Vicksburg. He attended Hinds Community College and the University of Alabama at Birmingham.

== Career ==
Since 2011, Ford has operated the Ford Insurance Agency. He was elected to the Mississippi House of Representatives in November 2016 and assumed office in January 2017. Since 2019, he has also served as vice chair of the House Insurance Committee.
