= Thomas Reynolds II =

American politician

Member of the Mississippi House of Representatives from the 33rd district
- In office January 8, 1980 – January 2, 2024
- Preceded by: James W. Brown Jr.
- Succeeded by: Jim Estrada

Personal details
- Born: Thomas Upton Reynolds II; November 15, 1954 (age 71) Charleston, Mississippi, U.S.
- Party: Democratic
- Spouse: Elizabeth Fedric
- Education: University of Mississippi

Thomas Upton Reynolds II (born November 15, 1954) is an American politician. He is a former member of the Mississippi House of Representatives from the 33rd District, being first elected in 1980 and serving till 2024. He is a member of the Democratic party.
