= Stacey Hobgood-Wilkes =

American politician (born 1968)

Member of the Mississippi House of Representatives from the 108th district
- Incumbent
- Assumed office August 9, 2017
- Preceded by: Mark Formby

Personal details
- Born: August 9, 1968 (age 57)
- Party: Republican
- Education: University of Southern Mississippi (BS)

Stacey Hobgood-Wilkes (born August 9, 1968) is an American politician serving as a member of the Mississippi House of Representatives from the 108th district. She was first elected in July 2017 in a special election to succeed Mark Formby, who resigned to lead the Mississippi Workers' Compensation Commission. Hobgood-Wilkes assumed office on August 9, 2017.

== Education ==
After graduating from Picayune Memorial High School, Hobgood-Wilkes attended Pearl River Community College and earned a Bachelor of Science degree in American studies and business administration from the University of Southern Mississippi.

== Career ==
Prior to entering politics, Hobgood-Wilkes worked as a public relations consultant and insurance agent. She was elected to the Mississippi House of Representatives in July 2017 and assumed office in August 2017. During the 2019–2020 legislative session, she served as vice chair of the Marine Resources Committee. During the 2020–2021 legislative session, she served as vice chair of the House Constitution Committee.
