= Neil Whaley =

American politician (born 1988)

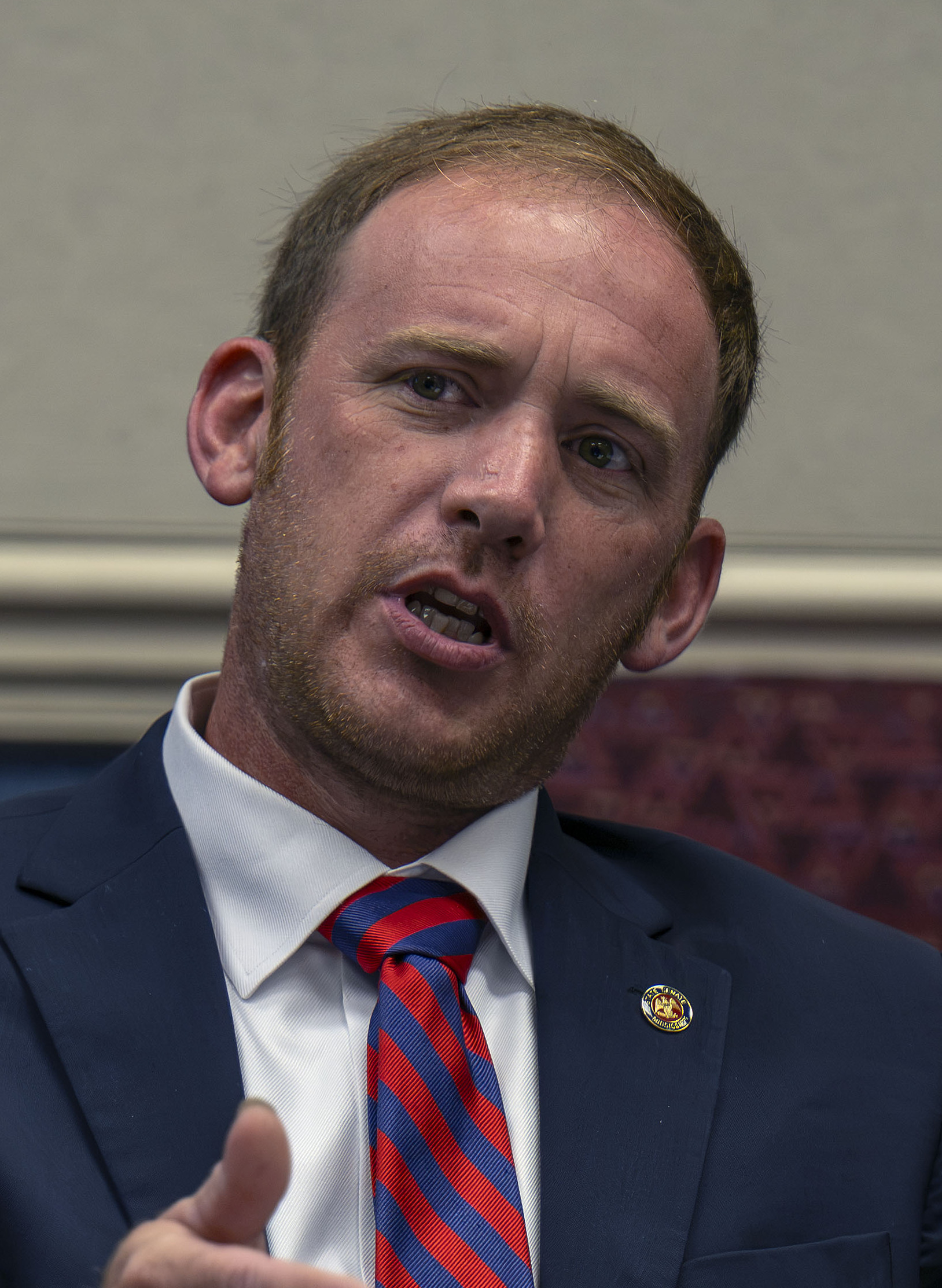
- Whaley speaking in 2026

Member of the Mississippi State Senate from the 10th district
- Incumbent
- Assumed office December 11, 2017
- Preceded by: Bill Stone

Personal details
- Born: May 24, 1988 (age 38)
- Party: Republican

Neil S. Whaley (born May 24, 1988) is an American politician who has served in the Mississippi State Senate from the 10th district since 2017.
