= J. P. Wilemon =

American politician

Member of the Mississippi Senate from the 5th district
- In office January 2004 – January 2020
- Preceded by: Charles Walden
- Succeeded by: Daniel Sparks

Personal details
- Born: James Price Wilemon Jr. September 10, 1940 (age 86) Prentiss County, Mississippi, U.S.
- Party: Democratic
- Spouse: Bobbie Johnson
- Children: 2
- Education: Memphis State University (BA)
- Profession: Banker

James Price Wilemon Jr. (born September 10, 1940) is a former Democratic member of the Mississippi Senate, where he representing the 5th district. The 5th district is located in the northeastern portion of the state and includes all or portions of Tishomingo, Prentiss and Itawamba counties. He first won the seat at the 2003 general election after initially losing to his predecessor, Republican Charles Walden, in a special election in 2002 after the longtime holder of the seat, Democrat John White, resigned; he beat Walden in the rematch.

In the Senate, during the 2015-2019 session, he was the chair of the Municipalities Committee, Vice Chair of the Committees on Accountability, Efficiency & Transparency and Business and Financial Institutions respectively. He also serves on Appropriations, Drug Policy, Education, Enrolled Bills, Investigate State Offices, Judiciary-Division B and Universities & Colleges.
