= Doug McLeod (Mississippi politician) =

American politician

Member of the Mississippi House of Representatives from the 107th district
- In office January 3, 2012 – January 2, 2024
- Preceded by: Deryk Parker
- Succeeded by: Steve Lott

Personal details
- Born: Douglas Dwain McLeod; December 15, 1960 (age 65) Lucedale, Mississippi, U.S.
- Party: Republican
- Spouse: Michele Fontenelle

Douglas Dwain McLeod (born December 15, 1960) is a former American politician from the state of Mississippi. A Republican, he has served in the Mississippi House of Representatives from 2012 to 2024.

== Early life ==
McLeod attended Hinds Community College and Mississippi Gulf Coast Community College.

== Political career ==
=== Election results ===
2011 general election, State Representative, District 107
Party	Candidate	Votes	%
Republican	Douglas D. McLeod	6,110	68.5%
Democratic	Douglas L. Lee	2,806	31.5%

2015 general election, State Representative, District 107
Party	Candidate	Votes	%
Republican	Doug McLeod	5,197	76.3%
Democratic	Austin Howell	1,574	23.2%

== Personal life ==
He and his wife, Michele, have three children.

== Arrest for alleged domestic violence ==
On May 18, 2019, McLeod was arrested for allegedly punching his wife in the face because it was claimed, she did not undress quickly enough before they were able to have sex. According to a report from sheriff's deputies, McLeod bloodied her nose and they found blood on their bed and bedroom floor. When they arrived he appeared intoxicated, was stumbling and was holding an alcoholic drink. They wrote, "McLeod had slurred speech and walked slow in a zigzag pattern," and he appeared so inebriated he had to grab a handrail to maintain his balance. After arriving they saw a pair of frightened women. McLeod's wife eventually came outside after deputies assured her they would keep her away from her husband. A deputy indicated McLeod's wife was shaking and upset, reporting that she said her husband was drunk and "just snapped," as she said he often does when under the influence of alcohol. Another woman who was present reported that McLeod's wife came running to her room, with her face bloodied. The woman shut the door with McLeod's wife inside and she said he commenced banging on the door, telling the women to open it. The other woman reported that McLeod said if she didn't open the door, he'd "kill her dog."

McLeod and his wife issued a joint statement thanking friends and family for their "prayers and support." In the end, McLeod never resigned or readdressed the situation, even after Mississippi House Speaker Philip Gunn, a Republican, called on McLeod to resign if the alleged incident is factual.

He was found not guilty of domestic assault in court after his wife unexpectedly testified on his behalf that the hit was accidental.
