= Ronnie Crudup Jr. =

American politician, activist, and pastor

Member of the Mississippi House of Representatives from the 71st district
- Incumbent
- Assumed office March 18, 2019
- Preceded by: Adrienne Wooten

Personal details
- Born: June 12, 1977 (age 49)
- Party: Democratic
- Education: Belhaven University (BS)

Ronnie C. Crudup Jr. (born June 12, 1977) is an American politician, activist, and pastor serving as a member of the Mississippi House of Representatives. He assumed office on March 18, 2019.

== Education ==
Crudup graduated from Murrah High School and earned a Bachelor of Science degree in history from Belhaven University.

== Career ==
From 2006 to 2011, Crudup worked as an executive assistant at New Horizon Church International. He has been the executive director of New Horizon Ministries Inc. since July 2011. Crudup was a Democratic candidate in the 2017 Jackson mayoral election, placing fifth in a field of nine candidates. Crudup was elected to the Mississippi House of Representatives in a 2019 special election.
