= Missy McGee =

American politician from the state of Mississippi

Missy Warren McGee
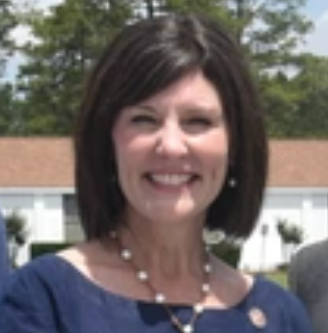

Member of the Mississippi House of Representatives from the 102nd district
- Incumbent
- Assumed office October 13, 2017
- Preceded by: Toby Barker

Personal details
- Born: Missy Warren McGee; March 31, 1966 (age 60) Hattiesburg, Mississippi, U.S.
- Party: Republican
- Children: 2
- Education: University of Southern Mississippi (BS, MA)
- Occupation: Politician, speech communication instructor

Missy Warren McGee (born March 31, 1966) is an American politician, representing the 102nd district in the Mississippi House of Representatives since 2017.

== Early life and education ==
McGee was born on March 31, 1966, in Hattiesburg, Mississippi, and attended Hattiesburg High School. Afterwards, she enrolled at the University of Southern Mississippi, where she graduated with a bachelor of science degree in speech communication. She earned her master's degree in speech communication from the same alma mater. After graduation, she worked as a Legislative Assistant for Congressman Trent Lott in Washington, D.C. She moved back to Mississippi and has worked as an instructor for speech communication at the University of Southern Mississippi.

== Career ==
McGee decided to run in a special election to fulfill the last two years of the outgoing Representative Toby Barker who was elected Mayor of Hattiesburg. In the special election, she ran against three others: Cory Ferraez, Casey Mercier, and Kathryn Rehner, all listed without party labels. McGee and Rehner advanced to a runoff after receiving the most votes of the four candidates, with McGee receiving about 45% of the vote and Rehner 24%. McGee won the run-off with 2,110 votes to 1,000 votes, a 67.8%–32.2% margin. She was sworn in on October 13, 2017. Then-Republican Governor Phil Bryant issued a congratulatory statement to McGee in response to the win.

The election win was notable for two reasons. First, McGee is the second woman to hold the District 102 seat, with the last being Evelyn Gandy, former Lieutenant Governor of Mississippi. Secondly, it allowed Republicans to maintain a supermajority in the Mississippi House. Although McGee was listed as independent on the ticket, McGee was supported by Republicans while her main contender, Rehner, was supported by Democrats. Once elected, McGee listed herself as Republican and emphasized her moderate viewpoints, stating "This is not about party to me."

McGee ran unopposed in the 2019 Republican primary election, and, in the general election, she faced off against Brandon Rue. McGee won with 65.04% of the vote.

For the 2024 House session, McGee serves as the Chair for the House Medicaid committee. She also serves on the following committees: Public Health and Human Services, Transportation, Appropriations, Rules and Universities and Colleges.

== Political positions ==
During the 2017 election, McGee campaigned on improving the public school system, infrastructure, and reducing brain drain.

McGee was the only Republican to vote against a 2019 heartbeat abortion bill. Although she voted yes to a 15-week abortion ban in 2018, McGee emphasized that she couldn't support the bill, stating, "...[I] cannot support legislation that makes such hard line, final decisions for other women."

In 2020, McGee voted yes on the bill to change the Mississippi State Flag.

== Personal life ==
McGee has two sons. They are Methodist.
