= Jeffery Harness =

American politician

Member of the Mississippi House of Representatives from the 85th district
- Incumbent
- Assumed office December 21, 2018

Personal details
- Born: April 8, 1978 (age 48) McComb, Mississippi, U.S.
- Party: Democratic
- Education: Alcorn State University (BS, MS); Southern University (JD)

Jeffery Harness (born April 8, 1978) is an American attorney and politician serving as a member of the Mississippi House of Representatives from the 85th district. Elected in November 2018, he assumed office on December 21, 2018.

== Early life and education ==
Harness was born in McComb, Mississippi. After graduating from Jefferson County High School, he earned a Bachelor of Science degree in agricultural economics and a Master of Science in secondary education from Alcorn State University, followed by a Juris Doctor from the Southern University Law Center.

== Career ==
Since January 2012, Harness has owned and operated an independent law firm. He was elected to the Mississippi House of Representatives in November 2020 and assumed office on December 21, 2018.
