= Christopher Bell (Mississippi politician) =

American politician

Chris Bell

Member of the Mississippi House of Representatives from the 65th district
- Incumbent
- Assumed office January 5, 2016
- Preceded by: Mary Coleman

Personal details
- Born: Christopher M. Bell; August 13, 1970 (age 55) Chicago, Illinois, U.S.
- Party: Democratic
- Education: Jackson State University (BS)

Christopher M. "Chris" Bell (born August 13, 1970) is an American politician serving as a member of the Mississippi House of Representatives from the 65th district. Elected in November 2015, he assumed office on January 5, 2016.

== Early life and education ==
Bell was born in Chicago, Illinois, on August 13, 1970. He earned a Bachelor of Science degree in criminal justice from Jackson State University.

== Career ==
Outside of politics, Bell works in the insurance industry. He was elected to the Mississippi House of Representatives in November 2015 and assumed office on January 5, 2016. Bell also serves as vice chair of the House Executive Contingent Fund Committee.
