= Tom Miles (politician) =

American politician

Member of the Mississippi House of Representatives from the 75th district
- In office 2012 – January 2, 2024
- Preceded by: Tracy Arinder, Jr.
- Succeeded by: Celeste Hurst

Personal details
- Born: November 3, 1979 (age 46) Morton, Mississippi, U.S.
- Party: Democratic
- Education: Mississippi State University
- Occupation: Self employed
- Website: Tommiles2011.com

Tom Miles (born November 3, 1979) is a former member of the Mississippi House of Representatives, representing the 75th district (Rankin County and Scott County) from 2012 to 2024. Representative Miles is now currently serving as the Chancery Clerk of Scott County. Miles is a graduate of Morton High School and Mississippi State University. As a college student, Miles opened a business to pay for his own education.

In 2013, Miles announced a plan to introduce truth-in-labeling laws, which would require country of origin labels for chicken. In 2019 Miles tweeted in favor of a new license plate design which includes the phrase "In God We Trust," after freedom from religion advocates threatened to sue the state over the design.

Miles is a Sunday School teacher at Forest Baptist Church; a member of the Rankin, Scott, and Forest County Chambers of Commerce; the president of Friends of Roosevelt State Park (Roosevelt State Park); and a first responder for the Scott County Search and Rescue team.

Miles chose not to run for re-election to the Mississippi House of Representatives at the end of his term in 2023. Instead, he ran for and won the position of Chancery Clerk of Scott County.
