= Rob Roberson =

American politician

Member of the Mississippi House of Representatives from the 43rd district
- Incumbent
- Assumed office January 5, 2016
- Preceded by: Michael Evans

Member of the Mississippi House of Representatives from the 37th district
- In office January 1999 – January 6, 2004
- Preceded by: Cecil L. Simmons
- Succeeded by: Gary Chism

Personal details
- Born: August 4, 1968 (age 58) Greenville, Mississippi, U.S.
- Party: Republican
- Spouse: Karen Shurden
- Education: Mississippi State University; Mississippi College

Loyd B. "Rob" Roberson II (born August 4, 1968) is an American politician. He is a member of the Mississippi House of Representatives from the 43rd district, having been elected in 2015. He was previously a member of the House from the 37th district and ran unsuccessfully for the 15th state senate district in 2003.
