= Mac Huddleston =

American politician (1943–2023)

Member of the Mississippi House of Representatives from the 15th district
- In office January 8, 2008 – August 27, 2023
- Preceded by: Pat Montgomery
- Succeeded by: Beth Luther Waldo

Personal details
- Born: Elton Mac Huddleston Jr. September 16, 1943 Holmes County, Mississippi, U.S.
- Died: August 27, 2023 (aged 79) Tupelo, Mississippi, U.S.
- Party: Republican
- Spouse: Flavia Hutchinson
- Children: 4
- Education: Mississippi State University (BS); Auburn University (DVM)
- Profession: Veterinarian

Military service
- Allegiance: United States
- Branch/service: United States Army
- Years of service: 1966–1968
- Rank: Captain
- Battles/wars: Vietnam War
- Awards: Air Medal (21)

Elton Mac Huddleston Jr. (September 16, 1943 – August 27, 2023) was an American politician of the Republican Party. He was a member of the Mississippi House of Representatives, representing the 15th district, from 2008 until his death.

== Early life ==
Huddleston was born on September 16, 1943, in Holmes County, Mississippi, where he was raised by his grandparents. He graduated from Mississippi State University, where he studied accounting, and from the Auburn University College of Veterinary Medicine.

Huddleston served with the 9th Division as a lieutenant in the Mekong River Delta during the Vietnam War, operating a UH-1 Iroquois (Huey) helicopter.

Huddleston worked as a veterinarian, serving as executive secretary of the Mississippi Veterinary Medical Association and the Mississippi Board of Veterinary Medicine.

== Political career ==
Huddleston was first elected to the state legislature in 2007. He intended to retire after the 2023 elections, but died before the end of his term. He chaired the ethics committee at the time of his death.

=== Committee assignments ===
As of 2015:

- Appropriations – Vice-chair
- Agriculture
- Apportionment and Elections
- Congressional Redistricting
- Ethics
- Legislative Reapportionment
- Military Affairs
- Public Health and Human Services
- Rules
- Universities and Colleges

== Personal life and death ==
Huddleston was a Baptist. He was married to the former Flavia Hutchinson for 32 years, and had four children.

Mac Huddleston died from multiple myeloma at a hospice in Tupelo, Mississippi, on August 27, 2023, at the age of 79.
