= Jody Steverson =

American politician

Member of the Mississippi House of Representatives from the 4th district
- Incumbent
- Assumed office January 3, 2012
- Preceded by: Greg Ward

Personal details
- Born: Joseph F. Steverson; August 21, 1968 (age 58) Tupelo, Mississippi, U.S.
- Party: Republican (2015–present); Democratic (2011–2015)
- Spouse: Lauren Bailey
- Education: Northeast Mississippi Community College; Mississippi State University

Joseph F. "Jody" Steverson (born August 21, 1968) is a Republican member of the Mississippi House of Representatives, representing the 4th district. Steverson is the Director of Voice and Data for Ripley Video Cable Company. On November 5, 2015, Steverson switched his party affiliation to Republican Party, two days after being reelected unopposed as a Democrat.
