= Sam Mims V =

American politician

Member of the Mississippi House of Representatives from the 97th district
- Incumbent
- Assumed office January 6, 2004
- Preceded by: Clem Nettles

Personal details
- Born: Samuel Cochran Mims V April 2, 1972 (age 54) McComb, Mississippi, U.S.
- Party: Republican
- Spouse: Amy Legg (m. 1996)
- Relations: Sam Mims Jr. (great-grandfather)
- Education: Delta State University (BBA)

Samuel Cochran Mims V (born April 2, 1972) is an American politician. He is a member of the Mississippi House of Representatives from the 97th District, being first elected in 2003. He is a member of the Republican party.

Mims' great-grandfather, Sam Mims Jr., was a (Democratic) Mississippi state senator.

He was married to the former Amanda Ashley Legg at Centenary United Methodist Church in McComb on September 7, 1996. They have two daughters and one son, named Sam VI.

On Tuesday, July 7, 2020 Mims, who chairs the House Public Health Committee, announced that he had tested positive for COVID-19.
