= Gregory Holloway Sr. =

American politician (born 1957)

Member of the Mississippi House of Representatives from the 76th district
- Incumbent
- Assumed office 2000

Personal details
- Born: December 27, 1957 (age 68) Hazlehurst, Mississippi, U.S.
- Party: Democratic

Gregory Holloway Sr. (born December 27, 1957) is an American politician. He is a member of the Mississippi House of Representatives from the 76th District, being first elected in 1999. He is a member of the Democratic Party. He is married to April Holloway, who is the Tax Collector of Copiah County. They reside in their native Hazlehurst, Mississippi.
