= Earle S. Banks =

American politician (born 1954)

Member of the Mississippi House of Representatives from the 67th district
- Incumbent
- Assumed office January 1993

Personal details
- Born: June 25, 1954 (age 72) Jackson, Mississippi, U.S.
- Party: Democratic
- Education: Jackson State University; Mississippi College School of Law
- Occupation: Attorney, funeral director

Earle Stewart Banks Sr. (born June 25, 1954) is an American politician, representing the 67th district in the Mississippi House of Representatives since 1993.

== Biography ==
Banks was born in Jackson, Mississippi, on June 25, 1954, and attended St. Joseph's High School. After, he earned a Bachelor of Science degree in Accounting from Jackson State University and his Juris Doctor from the Mississippi College School of Law. He helps lead a family-owned funeral home service in Jackson.

Banks was elected to the Mississippi House of Representatives in 1992. In 2023, he was sentenced to two years probation for filing a false income tax statement in 2020.

== Personal life ==
Banks is Catholic.
