= John Faulkner (American politician) =

American politician

Member of the Mississippi House of Representatives from the 5th district
- Incumbent
- Assumed office 2014

Personal details
- Born: John G. Faulkner; August 20, 1965 (age 60)
- Party: Democratic

John G. Faulkner (born August 20, 1965) is a Democratic member of the Mississippi House of Representatives, having represented the 5th District since 2014.

== Biography ==
John G. Faulkner was born on August 20, 1965. He graduated from Holly Springs High School, the Army School of Nursing, and Strayer University. He is a youth counselor by occupation. He began representing Mississippi's 5th House district, composed of Benton, Lafayette, Marshall, and Tate Counties, in the Mississippi House of Representatives as a Democrat in 2014.
