= Josh Harkins =

American politician

Member of the Mississippi State Senate from the 20th district
- Incumbent
- Assumed office January 3, 2012
- Preceded by: Lee Yancey

Personal details
- Born: Josh Harkins; April 5, 1974 (age 52) Jackson, Mississippi, U.S.
- Party: Republican
- Spouse: Andrea Scales
- Children: 2
- Education: Mississippi State University (BBA)
- Occupation: Real estate broker

Josh Harkins (born 5 April 1974) is an American politician. He serves as a Republican member of the Mississippi State Senate.

== Early life ==
Josh Harkins was born on April 5, 1974, in Jackson, Mississippi. He graduated from Mississippi State University.

== Career ==
Harkins has served as a Republican member of the Mississippi State Senate since 2012, where he represents District 20, including parts of Rankin County, Mississippi.

== Personal life ==
Harkins is married to Andrea Scales and has two children. They reside in Flowood, Mississippi.

== In popular culture ==
Harkins was featured on the Mississippi episode of Irish network TG4's television travel series Hector - Ó Chósta go Cósta, speaking in support of the benefits of exercise and fitness for Mississippians at the Paul Lacoste gym.
