= Percy Willis Watson =

American politician

Percy Watson
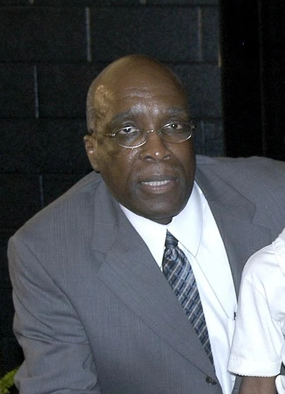

Member of the Mississippi House of Representatives from the 103rd district
- Incumbent
- Assumed office January 8, 1980

Personal details
- Born: June 5, 1951 (age 75) Hattiesburg, Mississippi, U.S.
- Party: Democratic

Percy Willis Watson (born June 5, 1951) is an American politician. He is a member of the Mississippi House of Representatives from the 103rd District, being first elected in 1980. He is a member of the Democratic party.

== Biography ==
Percy Willis Watson was born on June 5, 1951, in Hattiesburg, Mississippi. He was one of 11 children of P. W. and Eartha Watson. He graduated from the segregated L. J. Rowan High School as the valedictorian of his class in 1969. Watson earned a full scholarship to and then attended the University of Iowa, graduating after three years with a B. A. in political science with special honors in May 1972. In the University of Iowa, Watson was elected to the Phi Beta Kappa society. He then attended the University of Iowa College of Law, receiving his J. D. (in an accelerated program) just two years later in 1974. Watson then moved to Alaska, passed the state bar exam, and became an attorney, working as an associate with the law firm of M. Ashley Dickerson, Inc. in Anchorage, Alaska. Finding his career in Alaska unfulfilling, Watson moved back to his hometown of Hattiesburg to practice law there.

== Political career ==
=== 1979-1983 ===
In June 1979, Watson, a Democrat, announced his candidacy to represent the 104th district, composed of part of Hattiesburg, in the Mississippi House of Representatives. This district had been recently created due to redistricting ordered by the United States District Court for the Southern District of Mississippi case, Connor v. Finch. During his campaign, Watson received racist hate mail from whites, and did not campaign actively in the white community to avoid having white people be encouraged to vote against him in the election. Watson defeated a white attorney, Michael B. "Mike" McMahan, in the Democratic primary, by a vote of 2418 to 1361. As there was no Republican candidate, the primary was tantamount to the election. Watson attributed his victory in the election to the fact that the district had a black majority population. During the 1980–1984 term, Watson was a member of the House's Agriculture, Judiciary "A", and Universities & Colleges committees as well as the combined legislature's Executive Contingent Fund committee. He was also the chairman of the House's Black Caucus.

=== 1983-1987 ===
Watson ran unopposed for re-election for the 103rd District. In the 1984 Session, Watson, along with 25 other representatives (led by Representative Eric Clark) sought to change the rules to decrease the power of the House's Speaker, C. B. Newman. However, the effort did not succeed, and Newman responded to it by appointing the "Terrible Twenty-Six" to marginal committees. Watson was taken off the Universities & Colleges committee and placed on the Penitentiaries and Game & Fish Committees (even though Watson had never gone hunting in his life). In 1984, Watson was elected as a delegate for the 1984 Democratic National Convention. In 1986, Watson joined a 20-member steering committee (that had the support of 65 representatives) that drafted a bill with a new set of rules, which would be presented in the 1987 session. With the new bill, leaders of certain committees would be now elected by members of the House instead of being chosen by the Speaker. The bill passed, prompting Newman's retirement after the end of the term.

=== 1987-1991 ===
Watson defeated challenger Charles L. Davis in the Democratic primary for re-election, and was the only candidate in the general election for the 103rd District. At the beginning of the 1988–1992 term, Watson was selected to chair the Judiciary "A" Committee, replacing fellow rule-change supporter Terrell Stubbs who had not run for re-election. Watson became the first black person to chair the Judiciary "A" Committee, as well as the House's highest-ranking black delegate. As the chair of the Judiciary "A" Committee, in the 1988 session, Watson was the lead negotiator in a tort reform conference committee to make a bill that would decrease the statute of limitations on lawsuits. However, the bill died because the negotiators could not reach agreement. In the 1989 session, the negotiation did not succeed in a tort reform bill that everyone agreed upon, but it was barely passed nonetheless. In the 1988 and 1990 sessions, Watson authored a bill to introduce landlord-tenant laws into Mississippi, but the bill was defeated each time.
