= Omeria Scott =

American politician (born 1956)

Member of the Mississippi House of Representatives from the 80th district
- Incumbent
- Assumed office January 4, 1993
- Preceded by: Johnny Stringer

Personal details
- Born: November 21, 1956 (age 69) Laurel, Mississippi, U.S.
- Party: Democratic
- Spouse: Charles Scott
- Education: University of Southern Mississippi

Omeria McDonald Scott (born November 21, 1956) is an American politician and a member of the Democratic Party. She is a member of the Mississippi House of Representatives from the 80th District and was first elected in 1992.

In January 2026 she proposed a law to prohibit police officers from using Taser.
