= John Read (Mississippi politician) =

American politician

Member of the Mississippi House of Representatives from the 112th district
- Incumbent
- Assumed office January 5, 1993
- Preceded by: Ray Vecchio

Personal details
- Born: John Oliver Read; July 8, 1941 (age 85) Bunkie, Louisiana, U.S.
- Party: Republican (2003–present); Democratic (until 2003)
- Spouse: Patricia
- Education: Northeast Louisiana University (BS)
- Occupation: Pharmacist; politician

Military service
- Allegiance: United States
- Branch/service: United States Navy

John Oliver Read (born July 8, 1941) is an American politician. He is a member of the Mississippi House of Representatives from the 112th District, being first elected in 1992. Read previously served as a councilman and the City of Gautier's mayor. He became a member of the Republican Party in 2003, having previously been a Democrat. Read's current term ends in January 2028.
