= Willie Bailey =

American politician

Member of the Mississippi House of Representatives from the 49th district
- Incumbent
- Assumed office 1995

Personal details
- Born: April 25, 1946 (age 80) Isola, Mississippi, U.S.
- Party: Democratic
- Education: George Washington University Law School Tougaloo College

Willie Bailey (born April 25, 1946) is an American politician. He is a member of the Mississippi House of Representatives from the 49th District, being first elected in 1994. He is a member of the Democratic Party.
