= Jerry Turner (politician) =

American politician

Jerry R. Turner

Member of the Mississippi House of Representatives from the 18th district
- Incumbent
- Assumed office January 6, 2004
- Preceded by: Tim Ford

Personal details
- Born: November 16, 1941 (age 84) Tupelo, Mississippi, U.S.
- Party: Republican

Jerry R. Turner (born November 16, 1941) is an American Republican politician. Since 2004, he has served as a member of the Mississippi House of Representatives from the 18th District.
