= Donnie Bell =

American politician (born 1963)

Member of the Mississippi House of Representatives from the 21st district
- Incumbent
- Assumed office January 8, 2008
- Preceded by: Bill Miles

Personal details
- Born: March 3, 1963 (age 63) Tupelo, Mississippi, U.S.
- Party: Republican (2011–present); Democratic (before 2011)
- Spouse: Nelda Higginbotham
- Education: Mississippi State University

Donnie Bell (born March 3, 1963) is an American politician. He is a member of the Mississippi House of Representatives from the 21st district, being first elected in 2007. He is a member of the Republican party.
