= Robert Evans (Mississippi politician) =

American politician (born 1950)

Bob Evans

Member of the Mississippi House of Representatives from the 91st district
- Incumbent
- Assumed office 2008

Personal details
- Born: February 3, 1950 (age 76) Hazlehurst, Mississippi, U.S.
- Party: Democratic

Robert E. "Bob" Evans (born February 3, 1950) is an American politician. He is a member of the Mississippi House of Representatives from the 91st District, being first elected in 2007. He is a member of the Democratic Party.

He graduated from Monticello High School. He received a B. A. from Mississippi State University and a J.D. from the Mississippi College School of Law.

Evans entered politics after working as a public defender, in which role his clients included Cory Maye.
