= Karl Gibbs =

American politician

Member of the Mississippi House of Representatives from the 36th district
- Incumbent
- Assumed office 2013
- Preceded by: David Gibbs

Personal details
- Born: October 31, 1963 (age 62) United States
- Party: Democratic
- Spouse: Sonya Deanes
- Profession: farmer, real estate investor

Karl Malinsky Gibbs (born October 31, 1963) is an American politician. He is a member of the Mississippi House of Representatives from the 36th District, first elected in 2013. He is a member of the Democratic party.
