= Timmy Ladner =

American politician

Member of the Mississippi House of Representatives from the 93rd district
- Incumbent
- Assumed office January 3, 2012
- Preceded by: Dirk Dedeaux

Personal details
- Born: July 4, 1963 (age 63) Gulfport, Mississippi, U.S.
- Party: Republican

Timmy Ladner (born July 4, 1963) is an American politician who has represented the 93rd district in the Mississippi House of Representatives since 2012. A Republican, he represented District 93.
