= John Hines (Mississippi politician) =

American politician

Member of the Mississippi House of Representatives from the 50th district
- Incumbent
- Assumed office 2001

Personal details
- Born: April 6, 1966 (age 60) Greenville, Mississippi, U.S.
- Party: Democratic

John W. Hines, Sr. (born April 6, 1966) is an American politician serving as a member of the Mississippi House of Representatives from the 50th District. A member of the Democratic party, he is also a member of the Mississippi Democratic Party's executive committee.
