= Charles Younger =

American politician

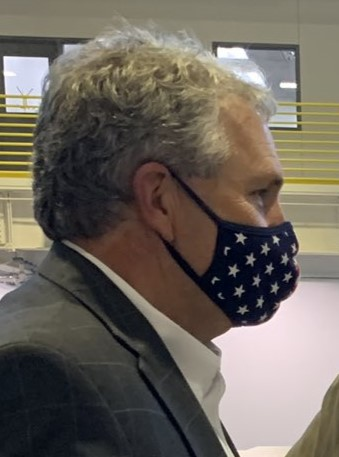

Member of the Mississippi State Senate from the 17th district
- Incumbent
- Assumed office November 26, 2014
- Preceded by: Terry W. Brown

Personal details
- Born: August 11, 1963 (age 63) Columbus, Mississippi
- Party: Republican

Charles Younger (born August 11, 1963) is an American politician who has served in the Mississippi State Senate from the 17th district since 2014.

He is a farmer and rancher. He graduated from East Mississippi Community College and Mississippi State University.
