= Lydia Chassaniol =

American politician

Member of the Mississippi Senate from the 14th district
- Incumbent
- Assumed office January 2, 2007
- Preceded by: Bunky Huggins

Personal details
- Born: Lydia Graves; December 29, 1950 (age 75) Winona, Mississippi, U.S.
- Party: Republican
- Spouse: Emmett Chassaniol
- Children: 2
- Education: University of Mississippi (BA)

Lydia Chassaniol (born December 29, 1950) is an American politician. She has served in the Mississippi Senate from the 14th district since 2007. Chassaniol is a member of the Republican Party.

== Career ==
Chassaniol is from Winona, Mississippi. She served on the Mississippi Parole Board from 1997 through 2000, and was first elected to the Mississippi Senate in 2007.

Chassaniol ran unopposed for District 14 of the Mississippi Senate in 2007. In November 2011, she was re-elected to the seat, defeating Democrat Carlos Moore. Chassaniol was re-elected again in 2015. During her time in office, Chassaniol has sponsored anti-immigration bills. She chairs the Mississippi Senate Tourism Committee, and is vice-chair of the state's committee on corrections.

== Membership in Council of Conservative Citizens ==
Chassaniol is a member of the Council of Conservative Citizens (CCC), and has spoken at the group's national convention. In her speech to the CCC Convention, she called its members "lone voices crying in the wilderness" and said that, "Seeing all of you here today gives me hope."

== Personal life ==
Chassaniol has been married three times and has two daughters.
