= Bill Kinkade =

American politician

Member of the Mississippi House of Representatives from the 52nd district
- Incumbent
- Assumed office January 9, 2013
- Preceded by: Tommy L. Wood

Personal details
- Born: 1957 (age 68–69)
- Party: Republican
- Spouse: Debra Sue

Bill Kinkade (born 1957) is an American politician. He is a Republican representing the 52nd district in the Mississippi House of Representatives.

== Political career ==
In 2012, former 52nd district representative Tommy L. Wood resigned, and a special election was held to replace him. Kinkade ran against Jeremy Bryan and Van Wicker; no candidate won a majority, and Kinkade and Bryan advanced to a runoff, which Kinkade won. In 2015 and 2019, Kinkade ran again and, both times, was unopposed in both the Republican primary and the general election.

As of June 2020, Kinkade sits on the following committees:

- Wildlife, Fisheries and Parks (Chair)
- Agriculture
- Energy
- Forestry
- Ways and Means
