= Mississippi House of Representatives =

Lower house of the Mississippi Legislature

Coordinates: 32°18′14″N 90°10′55″W

- Mississippi Legislature

Type
- Type: Lower house
- Term limits: None

History
- New session started: January 2, 2024

Leadership
- Speaker: Jason White (R) since January 2, 2024
- Speaker pro tempore: Manly Barton (R) since January 2, 2024
- Minority Leader: Robert Johnson III (D) since January 7, 2020

Structure
- Seats: 122
- Political groups: Republican (78); Democratic (42); Independent (2)
- Length of term: 4 years
- Authority: Article IV, Mississippi Constitution
- Salary: $10,000/year + per diem

Elections
- Last election: November 7, 2023 (122 seats)
- Next election: November 2, 2027 (122 seats)
- Redistricting: Legislative Control

Meeting place
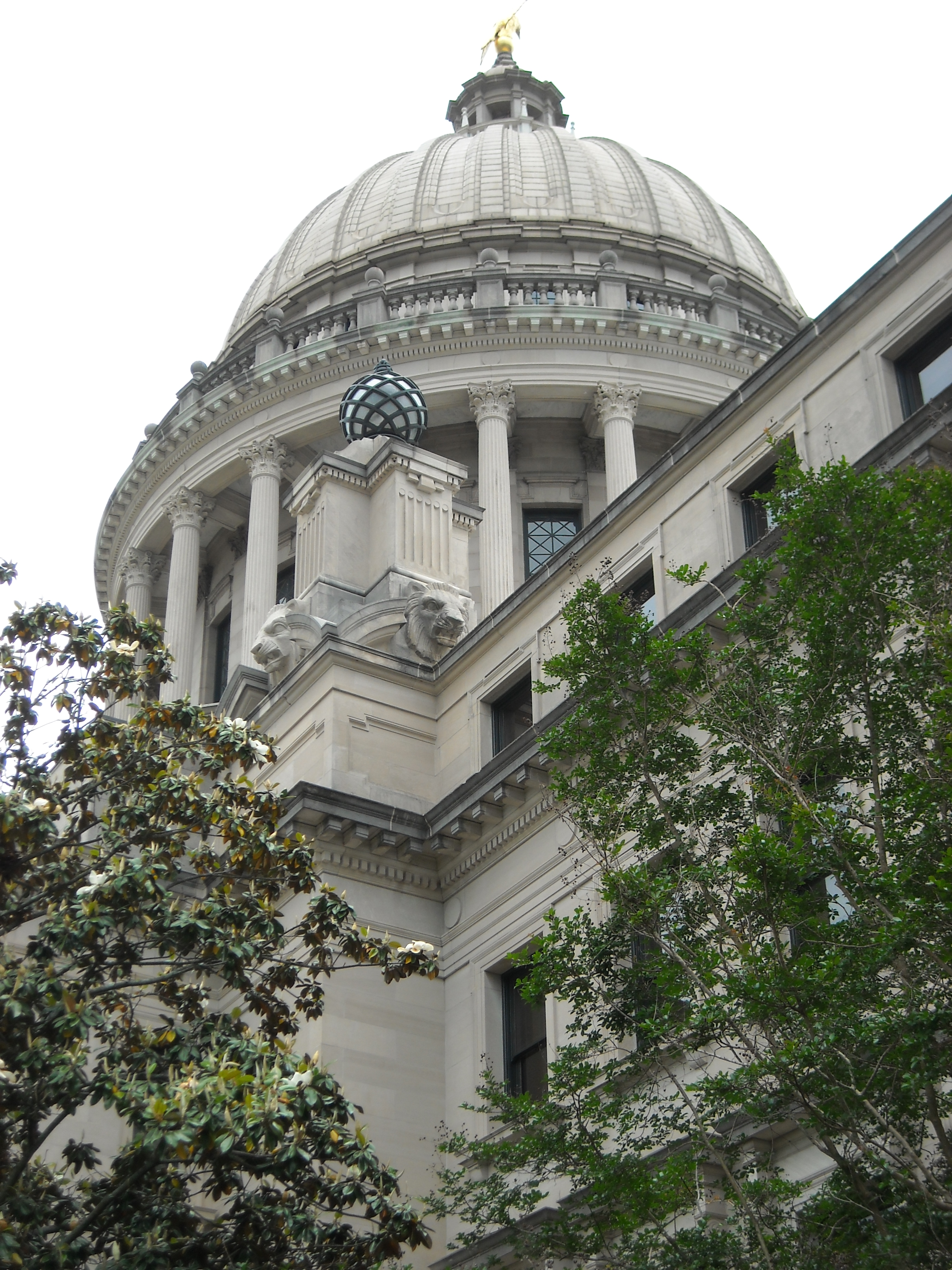
- House of Representatives Chamber; Mississippi State Capitol; Jackson, Mississippi

Website
- Mississippi House of Representatives

Rules
- House of Representatives Rules

The Mississippi House of Representatives is the lower house of the Mississippi Legislature, the lawmaking body of the U.S. state of Mississippi, the upper house being the Mississippi Senate. According to the state constitution of 1890, it is to comprise no more than 122 members elected for four-year terms. To qualify as a member of the House, candidates must be at least 21 years old, a resident of Mississippi for at least four years, and a resident in the district for at least two years. Elections are held the first Tuesday after the first Monday in November.

== Membership, qualifications, and apportionment ==
Article 4, Section 36 of the Mississippi Constitution specifies that the state legislature must meet for 125 days every four years and 90 days in other years. The Mississippi House of Representatives has the authority to determine rules of its own proceedings, punish its members for disorderly behavior, and expel a member with a two-thirds vote of its membership. Bills must undergo three readings in each house, unless two-thirds of the house dispenses with the rules. They cannot be amended to a new purpose. Amendments to bills must be approved by both houses.

The governor has the power to veto legislation, but legislators can override the veto with a two-thirds decision. From 1890 to 2020, State representatives were authorized under the Mississippi Constitution to elect the Governor of Mississippi if no candidate had received 62 of the 122 electoral votes (one per district) and more than 50% of the popular vote. This occurred only once, in 1999, when Ronnie Musgrove had the most votes statewide, but was one electoral vote and 2936 votes (0.38%) shy of a majority: Musgrove was elected on the first ballot.

=== Leadership ===
The permanent position of Speaker pro tempore was established in a House vote on January 9, 1987. (It had been previously used in temporary situations if the Speaker was not available.) The Speaker Pro Tempore acts as Speaker in the Speaker's absence. The Speaker Pro Tempore also serves ex officio as the Chair of the House Management Committee and as a member of the House Rules Committee. The current Speaker pro tempore is Republican Manly Barton.

== Salary ==
State representatives earn $23,500 per year.

== Current composition ==
The following composition reflects the balance of power after the 2023 elections. Republicans secured a majority for the fourth time since 2011, the first year when Republicans won the majority of seats in the State House since 1870. The 2023 elections were marked by new leadership, as the past speaker Phillip Gunn retired, allowing his chief lieutenant, then-Speaker Pro Tempore Jason White to become the new speaker. The 2023 elections saw the seating of 25 new members.

State representatives are elected every four years by the qualified electors of the district for which they are running. Candidates are required to be at least 21 years of age and a resident of the state and district for which they are campaigning.

Affiliation	Party (Shading indicates majority caucus)			Total	Vacant
Affiliation	Democratic	Republican	Independent	Total	Vacant
End of previous legislature (November 7, 2023)	40	76	3	119	3
Start of current legislature (January 2, 2024)	41	79	2	122	0
December 5, 2024	41	78	2	121	1
December 19, 2024	40	78	2	120	2
April 22, 2025	41	79	2	122	0
June 30, 2025	40	79	2	121	1
November 4, 2025	42	78	2	122	0
June 3, 2026	42	77	2	121	1
June 8, 2026	41	77	2	120	2
Latest voting share	34.2%	64.2%	1.7%		

=== List of members ===
District	Representative	Party	Assumed office	Residence	Notes
1	Lester Carpenter	Republican	2008	Burnsville	
2	Brad Mattox	Republican	2024	Corinth	
3	William Tracy Arnold	Republican	2012	Booneville	
4	Jody Steverson	Republican	2012	Ripley	
5	John Faulkner	Democratic	2014	Holly Springs	
6	Justin Keen	Republican	2024	Byhalia	
7	Kimberly Remak	Republican	2024	Olive Branch	
8	Trey Lamar	Republican	2012	Senatobia	
9	Cedric Burnett	Democratic	2016	Tunica	
10	Josh Hawkins	Republican	2024	Batesville	
11	Lataisha Jackson	Democratic	2013	Como	
12	Clay Deweese	Republican	2020	Oxford	
13	Steve Massengill	Republican	2012	Hickory Flat	
14	Sam Creekmore IV	Republican	2020	New Albany	
15	Beth Luther Waldo	Republican	2024	Pontotoc	
16	Rickey W. Thompson	Democratic	2020	Shannon	
17	Shane Aguirre	Republican	2016	Tupelo	
18	Jerry Turner	Republican	2004	Baldwyn	
19	Randy Boyd	Republican	2012	Mantachie	
20	Rodney Hall	Republican	2024	Southaven	
21	Donnie Bell	Republican	2008	Fulton	
22	Justin Crosby	Democratic	2026	Aberdeen	
23	Perry Van Bailey	Republican	2025	Calhoun City	
24	Jeff Hale	Republican	2016	Nesbit	
25	Dan Eubanks	Republican	2016	Walls	
26	Otha Williams	Democratic	2025	Lyon	
27	Kenji Holloway	Democratic	2024	Carthage	
28	Doc Harris	Republican	2024	Hernando	
29	Robert L. Sanders	Democratic	2021	Cleveland	
30	Tracey Rosebud	Democratic	2018	Tutwiler	
31	Otis Anthony	Democratic	2019	Indianola	
32	Solomon Osborne	Democratic	2019	Greenwood	
33	Jim Estrada	Republican	2024	Saucier	
34	Kevin Horan	Republican	2012	Grenada	
35	Joey Hood	Republican	2012	Ackerman	
36	Karl Gibbs	Democratic	2013	West Point	
37	Andy Boyd	Republican	2023	Columbus	
38	Cheikh Taylor	Democratic	2018	Starkville	
39	Dana McLean	Republican	2020	Columbus	
40	Hester Jackson-McCray	Democratic	2020	Horn Lake	
41	Kabir Karriem	Democratic	2016	Columbus	
42	Carl Mickens	Democratic	2016	Brooksville	
43	Rob Roberson	Republican	2016	Starkville	
44	C. Scott Bounds	Republican	2004	Philadelphia	
45	Keith Jackson	Democratic	2024	Preston	
46	Karl Oliver	Republican	2016	Winona	
47	Bryant Clark	Democratic	2004	Pickens	
48	Jason White	Republican	2012	West	Speaker of the House
49	Willie Bailey	Democratic	1995	Greenville	
50	John Hines	Democratic	2001	Greenville	
51	Timaka James-Jones	Democratic	2024	Belzoni	
52	Bill Kinkade	Republican	2013	Byhalia	
53	Vince Mangold	Republican	2016	Brookhaven	
54	Kevin Ford	Republican	2018	Vicksburg	
55	Oscar Denton	Democratic	2014	Vicksburg	
56	Clay Mansell	Republican	2024	Clinton	
57	Lawrence Blackmon	Democratic	2024	Canton	
58	Jonathan McMillan	Republican	2024	Madison	
59	Brent Powell	Republican	2013	Brandon	
60	Fred Shanks	Republican	2018	Brandon	
61	Gene Newman	Republican	2020	Pearl	
62	Lance Varner	Republican	2024	Florence	
63	Stephanie Foster	Democratic	2020	Jackson	
64	Shanda Yates	Independent	2020	Jackson	
65	Chris Bell	Democratic	2016	Jackson	
66	Fabian Nelson	Democratic	2024	Byram	
67	Earle S. Banks	Democratic	1993	Jackson	
68	Zakiya Summers	Democratic	2020	Jackson	
69	Tamarra Butler-Washington	Democratic	2024	Jackson	
70	Vacant				
71	Ronnie Crudup Jr.	Democratic	2019	Jackson	
72	Justis Gibbs	Democratic	2024	Jackson	
73	Jill Ford	Republican	2020	Madison	
74	Lee Yancey	Republican	2020	Brandon	
75	Celeste Hurst	Republican	2024	Sandhill	
76	Gregory Holloway Sr.	Democratic	2000	Hazlehurst	
77	Vacant				
78	Randy Rushing	Republican	2012	Decatur	
79	Mark Tullos	Republican	2016	Raleigh	
80	Omeria Scott	Democratic	1993	Laurel	
81	Stephen Horne	Republican	2004	Meridian	
82	Gregory Elliott	Democratic	2025	Meridian	
83	Billy Adam Calvert	Republican	2020	Meridian	
84	Troy Smith	Republican	2020	Enterprise	
85	Jeffery Harness	Democratic	2019	Fayette	
86	Shane Barnett	Republican	2016	Waynesboro	
87	Joseph Tubb	Republican	2021	Purvis	
88	Charles Blackwell	Republican	2024	Ellisville	
89	Donnie Scoggin	Republican	2017	Ellisville	
90	Noah Sanford	Republican	2016	Collins	
91	Bob Evans	Democratic	2008	Monticello	
92	Becky Currie	Republican	2008	Brookhaven	
93	Timmy Ladner	Republican	2012	Poplarville	
94	Robert Johnson III	Democratic	2004	Natchez	Minority leader
95	Jay McKnight	Republican	2020	Gulfport	
96	Angela Cockerham	Independent	2005	Magnolia	
97	Sam Mims V	Republican	2004	McComb	
98	Daryl Porter Jr.	Democratic	2020	Summit	
99	Bill Pigott	Republican	2008	Tylertown	
100	Ken Morgan	Republican	2007	Morgantown	
101	Kent McCarty	Republican	2019	Hattiesburg	
102	Missy McGee	Republican	2017	Hattiesburg	
103	Percy Watson	Democratic	1980	Hattiesburg	
104	Larry Byrd	Republican	2008	Petal	
105	Elliot Burch	Republican	2024	Lucedale	
106	Jansen Owen	Republican	2020	Poplarville	
107	Steve Lott	Republican	2024	Lucedale	
108	Stacey Hobgood-Wilkes	Republican	2017	Picayune	
109	Manly Barton	Republican	2012	Moss Point	Speaker pro tempore
110	Jeramey Anderson	Democratic	2014	Escatawpa	
111	Jimmy Fondren	Republican	2024	Pascagoula	
112	John Read	Republican	1993	Gautier	
113	Henry Zuber III	Republican	2000	Ocean Springs	
114	Jeffrey S. Guice	Republican	2008	Ocean Springs	
115	Zachary Grady	Republican	2024	D'Iberville	
116	Casey Eure	Republican	2011	Saucier	
117	Kevin Felsher	Republican	2020	Biloxi	
118	Greg Haney	Republican	2012	Gulfport	
119	Jeffrey Hulum III	Democratic	2022	Gulfport	
120	Richard Bennett	Republican	2008	Long Beach	
121	Carolyn Crawford	Republican	2012	Pass Christian	
122	Brent Anderson	Republican	2020	Bay St. Louis	

== List of speakers ==
The House has elected a speaker 63 times since 1817: (Note: It is 62 speakers with the most recent election of Jason White.)

	Name	Party	County/District	Term	Session
01	Thomas Barnes		Claiborne	October 6, 1817 – February 8, 1818	1st
02	Edward Turner		Adams	January 4, 1819 – February 1819	2nd
02	Edward Turner		Adams (Natchez)	January 3, 1820 – February 12, 1820	3rd
03	Beverly R. Grayson		Adams	January 1, 1821 – February 12, 1821	4th
04	Cowles Mead		Jefferson	November 5, 1821 – June 30, 1822	5th
05	Gerard C. Brandon		Wilkinson	December 23, 1822 – January 21, 1823	6th
06	Cowles Mead		Jefferson	December 22, 1823 – January 23, 1824	7th
06	Cowles Mead		Jefferson	January 3, 1825 – February 4, 1825	8th
07	Isaac R. Nicholson		Copiah	January 2, 1826 – January 31, 1826	9th
07	Isaac R. Nicholson		Copiah	January 1, 1827 – February 8, 1827	10th
08	Charles B. Green		Adams	January 7, 1828 – February 16, 1828	11th
09	William L. Sharkey		Warren	January 5, 1829 – February 6, 1829	12th
10	Joseph Dunbar		Jefferson	January 4, 1830 – February 13, 1830	13th
11	M. F. Degraffenreid		Wilkinson	November 15, 1830 – December 16, 1830	14th
11	M. F. Degraffenreid		Wilkinson	November 21, 1831 – December 20, 1831	15th
12	David Pemble		Amite	January 7, 1833 – March 2, 1833	16th
13	A. L. Bingaman		Adams	November 18, 1833 – January 30, 1835	17th
14	John Irvin		Carroll	1836–1837	
15	William Vannerson		Lawrence	1837–1838	
16	J. W. King		Rankin	1838–1840	
17	Jesse Speight	Democratic	Lowndes	1840–1841	
18	James A. Ventress		Wilkinson	1841–1842	
19	Robert W. Roberts	Democratic	Scott	1842–1844	
20	J. L. Totten	Democratic	Marshall	1844–1846	
21	James Whitfield	Democratic	Lowndes	1846–1848	
22	John J. McRae	Democratic	Clarke	1848–1852	
23	William S. Patton		Lauderdale	1852–1854	
24	Hiram Cassedy		Franklin	1854–1856	
25	William S. Barry	Democratic	Lowndes	1856–1858	
26	James L. Autry		Marshall	1858–1859	
27	J. A. P. Campbell		Attala	1859–1861	
28	William A. Lake		Warren	1861–1862	
29	J. P. Scales	Democratic	Carroll	1862–1863	
30	Lock E. Houston		Monroe	1863–1865	
31	Samuel J. Gholson	Democratic	Monroe	1865–1866	
32	Freeman E. Franklin	Republican	Yazoo	1870	
33	Henry Waterman Warren	Republican	Leake	1871–1872	
34	John R. Lynch	Republican	Adams	1872–1873	
35	Hugh M. Street	Democratic	Prentiss	1873–1874	
36	Isaac D. Shadd		Warren	1874–1876	
37	Hugh M. Street	Democratic	Prentiss	1876–1878	
38	William A. Percy	Democratic	Washington	1878–1880	
39	Benjamin F. Johns	Democratic	Amite	1880–1882	
40	W. H. H. Tison	Democratic	Lee	1882	
41	William M. Inge	Democratic	Alcorn	1884–1886	
42	Jacob H. Sharp		Lowndes	1886–1888	
43	Charles B. Mitchell	Democratic	Pontotoc	1888–1890	
44	James S. Madison	Democratic	Noxubee	January 7, 1890 – February 24, 1890	1890–1892
45	Hugh M. Street	Democratic	Lauderdale	January 5, 1892 – January 2, 1894	1892–1896
46	J. K. Vardaman	Democratic	Leflore	January 2, 1894 – February 10, 1894	1892–1896
47	James F. McCool	Democratic	Attala	January 7, 1896 – February 11, 1898	1896–1900
48	A. J. Russell	Democratic	Lauderdale	January 2, 1900 – March 5, 1902	1900–1904
49	Emmet Thomas	Democratic	Washington	January 5, 1904 – April 21, 1906	1904–1908
50	Hugh M. Street	Democratic	Lauderdale	January 7, 1908 – November 15, 1911	1908–1912
51	Hillrie M. Quin	Democratic	Hinds	January 2, 1912 – March 28, 1914	1912–1916
52	Mike Conner	Democratic	Covington	January 1916 – March 1918	1916–1920
52	Mike Conner	Democratic	Covington	1920–1924	
53	Thomas L. Bailey	Democratic		1924–1936	
54	Horace Stansel	Democratic	Sunflower	1936–1936	
55	Fielding L. Wright	Democratic		1936–1940	
56	Samuel Lumpkin	Democratic	Lee	1940–1944	
57	Walter Sillers Jr.	Democratic	Bolivar	1944–1966	
58	John R. Junkin	Democratic	Adams	1966–1976	
59	Buddie Newman	Democratic		1976–1988	
60	Tim Ford	Democratic	18	January 5, 1988 – December 20, 1991	1988–1992
60	Tim Ford	Democratic		1992–2004	
61	William J. McCoy	Democratic	3	January 6, 2004 – May 18, 2007	2004–2008
61	William J. McCoy	Democratic		2008–2012	
62	Philip Gunn	Republican	56	January 3, 2012 – April 5, 2015	2012–2016
62	Philip Gunn	Republican	56	January 6, 2016 – March 29, 2019	2016–2020
62	Philip Gunn	Republican	56	January 2, 2020 – April 2, 2023	2020–2024
63	Jason White	Republican	48	January 2, 2024 – Present	2024–2028

== List of speakers pro tempore ==
Source for session dates:

Before the position was made permanent, Buddie Newman served as Speaker pro tempore in three different stints between 1974 and 1975.

	Name	Party	County/District	Term	Session
1st	Cecil L. Simmons	Democratic	37th	January 14, 1987 – August 29, 1987	1984–1988
1st	Cecil L. Simmons	Democratic	37th	January 5, 1988 – December 20, 1991	1988–1992
2nd	Robert G. Clark Jr.	Democratic	47th	January 7, 1992 – September 16, 1992	1992
2nd	Robert G. Clark Jr.	Democratic	47th	January 5, 1993 – April 11, 1995	1993–1996
2nd	Robert G. Clark Jr.	Democratic	47th	January 2, 1996 – July 22, 1999	1996–2000
2nd	Robert G. Clark Jr.	Democratic	47th	January 4, 2000 – April 16, 2003	2000–2004
3rd	J. P. Compretta	Republican	122nd	January 6, 2004 – May 18, 2007	2004–2008
3rd	J. P. Compretta	Republican	122nd	January 8, 2008 – 2012	2008–2012
4th	Greg Snowden	Republican	83rd	January 3, 2012 – April 5, 2015	2012–2016
4th	Greg Snowden	Republican	83rd	January 6, 2016 – March 19, 2019	2016–2020
5th	Jason White	Republican	48th	January 2, 2020 – April 2, 2023	2020–2024
6th	Manly Barton	Republican	109th	January 2, 2024 – Present	2024–2028

== See also ==
- Mississippi State Senate
- Mississippi State Capitol
- Mississippi Legislature
- List of Mississippi state legislatures
