= 1988–1992 Mississippi Legislature =

←	1984–1988 Mississippi Legislature	1992 Mississippi Legislature	→

Overview
- Legislative body: Mississippi Legislature
- Jurisdiction: Mississippi, United States
- Meeting place: Mississippi State Capitol
- Term: 5 January 1988 – 7 January 1992
- Election: 1987 Mississippi elections

Mississippi State Senate
- Members: 52
- President: Brad Dye
- President pro tempore: Glen Deweese
- Party control: Democratic

Mississippi House of Representatives
- Members: 122
- Speaker: Tim Ford
- Party control: Democratic

Sessions
- 1st: 5 January 1988 – 8 May 1988
- 2nd: 10 August 1988 – 16 August 1988
- 3rd: 3 January 1989 – 10 April 1989
- 4th: 17 April 1989 – 19 April 1989
- 5th: 2 January 1990 – 14 April 1990
- 6th: 18 June 1990 – 30 June 1990
- 7th: 8 January 1991 – 6 May 1991
- 8th: 18 December 1991 – 20 December 1991

The 1988–1992 Mississippi Legislature met in eight sessions between January 5, 1988 and January 7, 1992.

== Background ==
Elections were held in November 1987, and members were elected to four-year terms.

== Officers ==
=== Senate ===
As Lieutenant Governor, Brad Dye served as President of the Senate. Glen Deweese, senator from the 33rd District, served as President pro tempore of the Senate. Non-senators Charles H. Griffin and Charles Ravencraft served as the Senate's Secretary and Sergeant-at-Arms, respectively.

=== House ===
Tim Ford, from the 18th District, served as Speaker of the House. Cecil L. Simmons, from the 37th District, served as Speaker pro Tempore. Non-representatives Charles J. Jackson Jr. served as Clerk, and Johnny Palmer served as Sergeant-at-Arms.

== Senate ==
The Senate had 52 members, each from a different district. The Senate had 46 Democrats and 6 Republicans. In November 1989, a special election was held to replace Senator Gene Taylor. The election was won by Democratic Bay St. Louis mayor Victor Franckiewicz Jr.

District	Counties represented	Senator Name	Residence	Party	Previous Term	Year of Birth
1	DeSoto	George Guerieri	Southaven	D	1980–1988	1927
2	Benton, Marshall, Tippah	Bill Renick	Ashland	D		1953
3	Pontotoc, Tippah, Union	Pud Graham	New Albany	D	1984–1988	1936
4	Alcorn, Tishomingo	Irb Benjamin	Rienzi	D	1984–1988	1946
5	Itawamba, Prentiss, Tishomingo	John White	Baldwyn	D	1984–1988	1937
6	Lee	Roger Wicker	Tupelo	R		1951
7	Clay, Lowndes, Monroe	Hob Bryan	Amory	D	1984–1988	1952
8	Calhoun, Chickasaw, Clay, Lee	Jack Gordon	Okolona	D	1980–1988	1944
9	Calhoun, Lafayette, Yalobusha	Johnny Morgan	Oxford	D	1984–1988	1947
10	Panola, Tate	Ronnie Musgrove	Batesville	D		1956
11	Coahoma, DeSoto, Quitman, Tunica	Kenneth Williams	Clarksdale	D		1924
12	Bolivar, Coahoma	Nevin Sledge	Cleveland	D	1984–1988	1921
13	Coahoma, Sunflower	Bob Crook	Ruleville	D	1984–1988	1929
14	Carroll, Leflore	Bunky Huggins	Greenwood	D	1984–1988	1938
15	Grenada, Montgomery, Tallahatchie	John Keeton	Grenada	D	1984–1988	1923
16	Lowndes, Oktibbeha, Webster	Bill Harpole (1988–1990)	Starkville	D	1976–1988	1912
16	Lowndes, Oktibbeha, Webster	Amy Tuck Powell (1991–1992)	Starkville	D		1963
17	Lowndes	Bill Canon	Columbus	D	1979–1988	1930
18	Choctaw, Neshoba, Winston	Terry Jordan	Philadelphia	D		1948
19	Attala, Carroll, Choctaw, Leake, Montgomery, Webster	Buddy Bond	Carthage	R	1985–1988	1932
20	Holmes, Madison, Yazoo	Bob Montgomery	Canton	D	1980–1988	1939
21	Holmes, Humphreys, Yazoo	Ollie Mohamed	Belzoni	D	1964–1972 1980–1988	1925
22	Humphreys, Sharkey, Sunflower, Washington, Yazoo	Hainon Miller	Greenville	D	1987–1988	1930
23	Issaquena, Warren, Washington	Robert Monty	Greenville	D		1944
24	Warren	Ken Harper	Vicksburg	D	1984–1988	1948
25	Hinds	Dick Hall	Jackson	R		1938
26	Hinds	Cy Rosenblatt	Jackson	D	1984–1988	1954
27	Hinds	Doug Anderson	Jackson	D	1980–1988	1939
28	Hinds	Alice Harden	Jackson	D		1948
29	Hinds	Wayne Burkes (1988–1989)	Clinton	D	1980–1988	1929
29	Hinds	Richard White (1989–1992)	Terry	R		1949/50
30	Rankin	Barbara Blanton	Brandon	R		1937
31	Lauderdale, Newton, Scott	Alan Heflin	Forest	D	1984–1988	1939
32	Kemper, Lauderdale, Noxubee	Eddie Briggs	DeKalb	D	1984–1988	1949
33	Lauderdale	Glen Deweese	Meridian	D	1976–1988	1932
34	Clarke, Jasper, Smith	Billy Thames	Mize	D	1980–1988	1944
35	Copiah, Rankin, Simpson	Rob Smith	Jackson	D	1980–1988	1951
36	Claiborne, Copiah, Hinds, Jefferson	Lynn Posey	Union Church	D		1955
37	Adams, Wilkinson	Bob M. Dearing	Natchez	D	1980–1988	1935
38	Amite, Franklin, Pike	Pat Welch	McComb	D		1947
39	Lawrence, Lincoln, Pike	W. L. Rayborn	Brookhaven	D	1980–1988	1936
40	Lamar, Marion, Pike, Walthall	Joe Stogner	Sandy Hook	D		1939
41	Covington, Jefferson Davis, Jones	Ronnie Shows (1988–1989)	Bassfield	D	1980–1988	1947
41	Covington, Jefferson Davis, Jones	Billy V. Harvey (1989–1992)	Carson	D		1932
42	Jasper, Jones, Wayne	Vincent Scoper	Laurel	R	1980–1984	1933
43	George, Greene, Jackson, Wayne	Cecil Mills	Clara	D	1980–1988	1934
44	Forrest, Lamar, Perry	Jim Bean	Hattiesburg	R	1987–1988	1932
45	Forrest, Lamar	Rick Lambert	Hattiesburg	D	1980–1988	1952
46	Hancock, Harrison, Jackson	Gene Taylor (1988–1989)	Bay St. Louis	D	1984–1988	1953
46	Hancock, Harrison, Jackson	Vic Franckiewicz Jr. (1989–1992)	Bay St. Louis	D		
47	Hancock, Harrison, Pearl River, Stone	Wootsie Tate	Picayune	D		1934
48	Harrison	Clyde Woodfield	Gulfport	D		1933
49	Harrison	Bob Usey	Gulfport	R	1980–1988	1940
50	Harrison	Tommy Gollott	Biloxi	D	1980–1988	1935
51	Jackson	Stephen Hale	Pascaguola	D	1984–1988	1951
52	Jackson	Claude Bilbo	Pascaguola	D		1941

== House ==
The House had 122 members, each from a different district. At the start of the 1988 session, House had 113 Democrats and 9 Republicans. On April 11, 1990, four representatives (Guice, Holston, Ely, and Endt) switched from the Democratic to the Republican Party.

District	Counties represented	Representative Name	Residence	Party	Previous Term	Year of Birth
1	Alcorn, Tishomingo	Mack L. Wadkins	Iuka	D	1980–1988	1937
2	Alcorn	Harvey Moss	Corinth	D	1984–1988	1951
3	Alcorn, Prentiss	William J. McCoy	Rienzi	D	1980–1988	1942
4	Benton, Tippah	Joe M. McElwain	Ripley	D		1941
5	Marshall	Tommy L. Woods	Byhalia	D		1933
6	DeSoto	Morris Lee Scott	Hernando	D	1984–1988	1927
7	DeSoto	John Grisham Jr. (1988–1990)	Southaven	D	1984–1988	1955
7	DeSoto	Greg Davis (1991–1992)	Southaven			1966
8	DeSoto, Tate	Charlie Williams	Senatobia	D	1976–1988	1944
9	DeSoto, Quitman, Tunica	Clayton P. Henderson	Tunica	D	1980–1988	1954
10	Lafayette, Marshall, Panola	Harris L. Bryan	Batesville	D	1976–1988	1935
11	Panola, Quitman	Wes McIngvale	Batesville	D	1976–1988	1933
12	Lafayette	Edwin Perry	Oxford	D	1968–1988	1942
13	Benton, DeSoto, Marshall	Andy Morris	Ashland	D		1957
14	Union	John D. Pennebaker	New Albany	D	1976–1988	1943
15	Pontotoc	D. Ted Foster	Pontotoc	D		1948
16	Lee	D. Stephen Holland	Plantersville	D	1984–1988	1955
17	Lee	Eloise Scott	Tupelo	D		1932
18	Lee, Prentiss	Tim Ford	Tupelo	D	1980–1988	1951
19	Itawamba, Tishomingo	Bill Wheeler	Belmont	D		1961
20	Itawamba, Monroe	Dorlos Robinson (1988–1989)	Hamilton	D	1980–1988	1935
20	Itawamba, Monroe	Jerome Huskey (1990–1992)	Greenwood Springs			1936/1937
21	Itawamba, Monroe	Mike Mills	Aberdeen	D	1984–1988	1956
22	Chickasaw, Monroe	William E. Bowles	Houston	D	1984–1988	1934
23	Calhoun, Lafayette, Union, Yalobusha	Don Grist	Vardaman	D	1976–1988	1938
24	Grenada, Tallahatchie, Yalobusha	Mike Nipper	Grenada	D	1976–1988	1944
25	Carroll, Grenada, Montgomery	Billy D. Lancaster	Winona	D	1984–1988	1933
26	Bolivar, Coahoma	Aaron E. Henry	Clarksdale	D	1980–1988	1922
27	Coahoma	Delma Furniss	Rena Lara	D	1984–1988	1934
28	Bolivar	Charlie Capps Jr.	Cleveland	D	1972–1988	1925
29	Bolivar	Edward G. Jackson	Cleveland	D	1976–1988	1942
30	Quitman, Sunflower, Tallahatchie	Charles E. Waldrup	Drew	D	1987	1925
31	Sunflower	W. G. Poindexter	Inverness	D	1976–1988	1944
32	Grenada, Tallahatchie, Yalobusha	Thomas U. Reynolds	Charleston	D	1980–1988	1954
33	Leflore	James D. Green	Itta Bena	D	1984–1988	1921
34	Leflore	Joedy George	Greenwood	D		1936
35	Choctaw, Oktibbeha, Webster	Glenn D. Burdine	Mathiston	D		1930
36	Clay	H. Scott Ross	West Point	D	1984–1988	1960
37	Oktibbeha	Cecil L. Simmons	Maben	D	1972–1988	1946
38	Lowndes, Noxubee, Oktibbeha	Tyrone Ellis	Starkville	D	1980–1988	1946
39	Lowndes	Bruce J. Hanson	Columbus	D	1980–1988	1942
40	Lowndes	Terry W. Brown	Columbus	D		1950
41	Lowndes, Oktibbeha	Alfred L. Walker Jr.	Columbus	D		1935
42	Kemper, Lauderdale, Neshoba	Jerry E. Wilkerson	Daleville	D	1980–1988	1945
43	Noxubee, Winston	Bobby Moody	Louisville	D	1984–1988	1942
44	Neshoba	Shelton Bounds	Philadelphia	D		1929
45	Leake, Neshoba	Bennett Malone	Carthage	D	1980–1988	1944
46	Attala, Montgomery	Hubert S. McMillan	Kosciusko	D	1980–1988	1949
47	Holmes, Yazoo	Robert G. Clark Jr.	Lexington	ID	1968–1988	1929
48	Carroll, Holmes, Humphreys	Mary Ann Stevens	West	D	1981–1988	
49	Washington	Leslie D. King	Greenville	D	1980–1988	1949
50	Washington	Ashley Hines	Greenville	D	1984–1988	1951
51	Humphreys, Washington	David M. Halbrook	Belzoni	D	1968–1988	1927
52	Washington	H. L. Merideth Jr.	Greenville	D	1960–1988	1930
53	Issaquena, Sharkey, Warren	Charles Weissinger Jr.	Rolling Fork	D		1950
54	Warren	Ed Buelow Jr.	Vicksburg	R	1976–1988	1940
55	Warren	George Flaggs Jr.	Vicksburg	D		1953
56	Yazoo	Joel Netherland	Yazoo City	R	1984–1988	1935
57	Madison	Edward Blackmon Jr.	Canton	D	1979–1980 1984–1988	1947
58	Madison	Don Alford	Ridgeland	D	1980–1988	1950
59	Rankin	Frances Savage	Brandon	D	1984–1988	1940
60	Rankin	Cecil McCrory	Brandon	D		1951
61	Rankin	Ray Rogers	Pearl	D	1984–1988	1931
62	Copiah, Rankin, Simpson	Mark S. Scarborough	Florence	D	1984–1988	1957
63	Hinds	Walter L. Robinson Jr.	Bolton	D	1984–1988	1947
64	Hinds	Bill Denny	Jackson	R		1930
65	Hinds	Ken Stribling	Jackson	R		1959
66	Hinds	Kane Ditto (1988–1990)	Jackson	D		1944
66	Hinds	Mike Gunn (1991–1992)	Jackson			
67	Hinds	Hillman Terome Frazier	Jackson	D	1980–1988	1950
68	Hinds	Credell Calhoun	Jackson	D	1980–1988	1945
69	Hinds	Alyce Griffin Clarke	Jackson	D	1985–1988	1939
70	Hinds	Horace L. Buckley	Jackson	D	1976–1988	1941
71	Hinds	Dewayne Thomas	Jackson	R	1984–1988	1954
72	Hinds	John Reeves	Jackson	D	1984–1988	1957
73	Hinds	Jim Ellington	Jackson	R		1943
74	Hinds	William Hale Singletary	Clinton	D	1984–1988	1951
75	Scott	Richard L. Livingston	Pulaski	D	1972–1988	1940
76	Copiah, Hinds, Simpson	Clifford C. Britt	Wesson	D	1987	1948
77	Simpson	Brent Walker	Magee	D		1963
78	Neshoba, Newton	Raymond Comans	Decatur	D	1964–1976 1984–1988	1930
79	Covington, Scott, Smith	Eric C. Clark	Taylorsville	D	1980–1988	1951
80	Clarke, Jasper	Johnny W. Stringer	Montrose	D	1980–1988	1950
81	Lauderdale	Rick Fortenberry	Meridian	D	1984–1988	1946
82	Lauderdale	Charles L. Young	Meridian	D	1980–1988	1931
83	Lauderdale	Tommy Horne	Meridian	D	1972–1984	1936
84	Clarke, Lauderdale	Roy A. Dabbs	Meridian	D		1950
85	Claiborne, Jefferson	Charles B. Shepphard	Lorman	D	1980–1988	1949
86	Greene, Wayne	Joe Taylor	Waynesboro	D		1943
87	Jones	Gus Townsend	Laurel	D	1980–1988	1932
88	Jones	Gary Staples	Laurel	D		1940
89	Jones	D. R. "Dick" Anderson	Ellisville	D	1984–1988	1924
90	Covington, Jefferson Davis	J. L. Warren	Mt. Olive	D	1980–1988	1952
91	Jefferson Davis, Lawrence	Jimmy W. Tyrone	Monticello	D		1947
92	Lincoln	Robert D. Underwood	Brookhaven	D	1987–1988	1956
93	Amite, Franklin, Jefferson, Lincoln	Bobby Moak	Bogue Chitto	D	1984–1988	1958
94	Adams, Franklin	Barney Schoby	Natchez	D	1980–1988	1940
95	Adams	R. Ayres Haxton	Natchez	D		1948
96	Amite, Pike, Wilkinson	David L. Green	Gloster	D	1980–1988	1951
97	Pike	Thomas H. Walman	McComb	D	1976–1988	1943
98	Pike, Walthall	Clem M. Nettles	Jayess	D		1930
99	Lamar, Marion, Walthall	Robert E. Vince	Sandy Hook	D	1980–1988	1930
100	Marion	Miriam Simmons	Columbia	D		1928
101	Forrest, Lamar	Carl Parker	Sumrall	R		1923
102	Forrest	J. B. Van Slyke Jr.	Hattiesburg	D	1984–1988	1942
103	Forrest	Percy W. Watson	Hattiesburg	D	1980–1988	1951
104	Forrest	William Harold Jones	Petal	D	1980–1988	1952
105	George, Greene, Perry	Dorthy Cole	Richton	D		1933
106	Hancock, Harrison, Pearl River, Stone	Curtis Holston	Poplarville	D (1988–1990) R (1990–1992)	1984–1988	1939
107	George, Stone	Percy L. Maples	Lucedale	D	1982–1988	1938
108	Pearl River	Ezell Lee	Picayune	D		1933
109	Jackson	Frank Ely	Hurley	D (1988–1990) R (1990–1992)	1985–1988	1924
110	Jackson	William Mitchell Ellerby Sr.	Moss Point	D	1984–1988	1946
111	Jackson	Curt Hebert Jr.	Pascaguola	R		1962
112	Jackson	Raymond Vecchio	Gautier	D	1985–1988	1933
113	Jackson	Alvin C. Endt	Ocean Springs	D (1988–1990) R (1990–1992)	1984–1988	1933
114	Harrison, Jackson	Daniel D. Guice Jr.	Ocean Springs	D (1988–1990) R (1990–1992)	1984–1988	1953
115	Jackson	Ed Ryan	Biloxi	D		1939
116	Harrison	Oliver Diaz	Biloxi	R		1959
117	Harrison	Glenn E. Endris	Biloxi	D	1972–1988	1938
118	Harrison	Bob Short	Gulfport	D	1984–1988	1946
119	Harrison	Isiah Fredericks (1988–1990)	Gulfport	D	1980–1988	1930
119	Harrison	Frances Fredericks (1991–1992)	Gulfport	D		1935
120	Harrison	James C. Simpson	Long Beach	D	1964–1988	1930
121	Harrison	Diane C Peranich	Pass Christian	D		1940
122	Hancock	J. P. Compretta	Bay St. Louis	D	1976–1984	1945
