= 2019 Mississippi State Senate election =

- November 5, 2019

All 52 seats in the Mississippi State Senate 27 seats needed for a majority

	Majority party	Minority party
Leader	Gray Tollison (retired)	Derrick Simmons
Party	Republican	Democratic
Leader since	January 11, 2019	July 31, 2017
Leader's seat	District 9	District 12
Last election	33	19
Seats after	36	16
Seat change	▲3	▼3
Popular vote	480,583	281,733
Percentage	62.54%	36.66%
- Results: Democratic hold Democratic gain Republican hold Republican gain
President Pro Tempore before election
Gray Tollison
Republican
Elected President Pro Tempore
Dean Kirby
Republican

The 2019 Mississippi State Senate election was held on November 5, 2019, to determine which party would control the Mississippi State Senate for the following four years in the 2020–2024 Mississippi Legislature. All 52 seats in the Mississippi State Senate were up for election and the primary occurred on August 6, 2019. Prior to the election, 33 seats were held by Republicans and 19 seats were held by Democrats. The general election saw Republicans expand their majority in the State Senate by 3 seats.

== Predictions ==
Source	Ranking	As of
Sabato	Safe R	October 31, 2019

== Retirements ==
=== Democrats ===
1. District 5: J. P. Wilemon retired.
2. District 8: Russell Jolly retired.
3. District 13: Willie Lee Simmons retired to successfully run for Commissioner for the Mississippi Transportation Commission for the Central District.
4. District 37: Bob Dearing retired.

=== Republicans ===
1. District 3: Nickey Browning retired.
2. District 9: Gray Tollison retired.
3. District 22: Eugene Clarke retired.
4. District 31: Terry C. Burton retired.
5. District 33: Videt Carmichael retired.
6. District 45: Billy Hudson retired.
7. District 50: Tommy Gollott retired.
8. District 51: Michael Watson retired to successfully run for Secretary of State of Mississippi.

== Defeated incumbents ==
=== In primary ===
==== Democrats ====
1. District 48: Deborah Jeanne Dawkins lost renomination to Gary Fredericks.

==== Republicans ====
1. District 1: Chris Massey lost renomination to Michael McLendon.

== Closest races ==
Seats where the margin of victory was under 10%:

1. District 48, 3.18% (gain)
2. District 22, 4.84% (gain)

== Results ==
=== District 1 ===
District 1 election, 2019
Party	Candidate	Votes	%
Republican	Michael McLendon	12,842	100.0%
Total votes		12,842	100.0%
Republican hold			

=== District 2 ===
District 2 election, 2019
Party	Candidate	Votes	%
Republican	David Parker (incumbent)	6,137	60.35%
Democratic	Lee Jackson	4,032	39.65%
Total votes		10,169	100.0%
Republican hold			

=== District 3 ===
District 3 election, 2019
Party	Candidate	Votes	%
Republican	Kathy Chism	13,696	75.31%
Democratic	Tim Tucker	4,491	24.69%
Total votes		18,187	100.0%
Republican hold			

=== District 4 ===
District 4 election, 2019
Party	Candidate	Votes	%
Republican	Rita Potts Parks (incumbent)	16,200	100.0%
Total votes		16,200	100.0%
Republican hold			

=== District 5 ===
District 5 election, 2019
Party	Candidate	Votes	%
Republican	Daniel Sparks	14,109	72.14%
Democratic	Steve Eaton	5,450	27.86%
Total votes		19,559	100.0%
Republican gain from Democratic			

=== District 6 ===
District 6 election, 2019
Party	Candidate	Votes	%
Republican	Chad McMahan (incumbent)	15,803	100.0%
Total votes		15,803	100.0%
Republican hold			

=== District 7 ===
District 7 election, 2019
Party	Candidate	Votes	%
Democratic	Hob Bryan (incumbent)	12,593	100.0%
Total votes		12,593	100.0%
Democratic hold			

=== District 8 ===
District 8 election, 2019
Party	Candidate	Votes	%
Republican	Benjamin Suber	11,003	57.20%
Democratic	Kegan Coleman	8,234	42.80%
Total votes		19,237	100.0%
Republican gain from Democratic			

=== District 9 ===
District 9 election, 2019
Party	Candidate	Votes	%
Republican	Nicole Akins Boyd	11,254	58.24%
Democratic	Kevin Frye	8,069	41.76%
Total votes		19,323	100.0%
Republican hold			

=== District 10 ===
District 10 election, 2019
Party	Candidate	Votes	%
Republican	Neil Whaley (incumbent)	8,738	57.87%
Democratic	Andre R. DeBerry	6,360	42.13%
Total votes		15,098	100.0%
Republican hold			

=== District 11 ===
District 11 election, 2019
Party	Candidate	Votes	%
Democratic	Robert L. Jackson (incumbent)	10,059	73.78%
Independent	Clara Dawkins	3,574	26.22%
Total votes		13,633	100.0%
Democratic hold			

=== District 12 ===
District 12 election, 2019
Party	Candidate	Votes	%
Democratic	Derrick Simmons (incumbent)	9,422	81.47%
Independent	Paul Pecou	2,143	18.53%
Total votes		11,565	100.0%
Democratic hold			

=== District 13 ===
District 13 election, 2019
Party	Candidate	Votes	%
Democratic	Sarita Simmons	9,287	65.12%
Republican	B. C. Hammond	4,975	34.88%
Total votes		14,262	100.0%
Democratic hold			

=== District 14 ===
District 14 election, 2019
Party	Candidate	Votes	%
Republican	Lydia Chassaniol (incumbent)	16,240	100.0%
Total votes		16,240	100.0%
Republican hold			

=== District 15 ===
District 15 election, 2019
Party	Candidate	Votes	%
Republican	Gary Jackson (incumbent)	12,543	100.0%
Total votes		12,543	100.0%
Republican hold			

=== District 16 ===
District 16 election, 2019
Party	Candidate	Votes	%
Democratic	Angela Turner-Ford (incumbent)	14,210	100.0%
Total votes		14,210	100.0%
Democratic hold			

=== District 17 ===
District 17 election, 2019
Party	Candidate	Votes	%
Republican	Charles Younger (incumbent)	11,328	65.97%
Democratic	DeWanna Belton	5,444	31.71%
Libertarian	Danny Bedwell	398	2.32%
Total votes		17,170	100.0%
Republican hold			

=== District 18 ===
District 18 election, 2019
Party	Candidate	Votes	%
Republican	Jenifer Branning (incumbent)	13,197	100.0%
Total votes		13,197	100.0%
Republican hold			

=== District 19 ===
District 19 election, 2019
Party	Candidate	Votes	%
Republican	Kevin Blackwell (incumbent)	8,363	63.78%
Democratic	Dianne Black	4,749	36.22%
Total votes		13,112	100.0%
Republican hold			

=== District 20 ===
District 20 election, 2019
Party	Candidate	Votes	%
Republican	Josh Harkins (incumbent)	18,330	100.0%
Total votes		18,330	100.0%
Republican hold			

=== District 21 ===
District 21 election, 2019
Party	Candidate	Votes	%
Democratic	Barbara Blackmon (incumbent)	13,592	100.0%
Total votes		13,592	100.0%
Democratic hold			

=== District 22 ===
District 22 election, 2019
Party	Candidate	Votes	%
Democratic	Joseph C. Thomas	10,555	52.42%
Republican	Hayes Dent	9,582	47.58%
Total votes		20,137	100.0%
Democratic gain from Republican			

=== District 23 ===
District 23 election, 2019
Party	Candidate	Votes	%
Republican	Briggs Hopson (incumbent)	13,196	100.0%
Total votes		13,196	100.0%
Republican hold			

=== District 24 ===
District 24 election, 2019
Party	Candidate	Votes	%
Democratic	David Lee Jordan (incumbent)	13,275	100.0%
Total votes		13,275	100.0%
Democratic hold			

=== District 25 ===
District 25 election, 2019
Party	Candidate	Votes	%
Republican	J. Walter Michel (incumbent)	18,127	72.11%
Democratic	Earl Scales	7,012	27.89%
Total votes		25,139	100.0%
Republican hold			

=== District 26 ===
District 26 election, 2019
Party	Candidate	Votes	%
Democratic	John Horhn (incumbent)	15,751	100.0%
Total votes		15,751	100.0%
Democratic hold			

=== District 27 ===
District 27 election, 2019
Party	Candidate	Votes	%
Democratic	Hillman Terome Frazier (incumbent)	14,215	100.0%
Total votes		14,215	100.0%
Democratic hold			

=== District 28 ===
District 28 election, 2019
Party	Candidate	Votes	%
Democratic	Sollie Norwood (incumbent)	10,210	100.0%
Total votes		10,210	100.0%
Democratic hold			

=== District 29 ===
District 29 election, 2019
Party	Candidate	Votes	%
Democratic	David Blount (incumbent)	15,455	100.0%
Total votes		15,455	100.0%
Democratic hold			

=== District 30 ===
District 30 election, 2019
Party	Candidate	Votes	%
Republican	Dean Kirby (incumbent)	13,278	100.0%
Total votes		13,278	100.0%
Republican hold			

=== District 31 ===
District 31 election, 2019
Party	Candidate	Votes	%
Republican	Tyler McCaughn	11,993	68.29%
Democratic	Mike Marlow	5,569	31.71%
Total votes		17,562	100.0%
Republican hold			

=== District 32 ===
District 32 election, 2019
Party	Candidate	Votes	%
Democratic	Sampson Jackson (incumbent)	12,859	100.0%
Total votes		12,859	100.0%
Democratic hold			

=== District 33 ===
District 33 election, 2019
Party	Candidate	Votes	%
Republican	Jeff Tate	15,064	100.0%
Total votes		15,064	100.0%
Republican hold			

=== District 34 ===
District 34 election, 2019
Party	Candidate	Votes	%
Democratic	Juan Barnett (incumbent)	10,357	60.49%
Republican	Steven Wade	6,764	39.51%
Total votes		17,121	100.0%
Democratic hold			

=== District 35 ===
District 35 election, 2019
Party	Candidate	Votes	%
Republican	Chris Caughman (incumbent)	16,280	100.0%
Total votes		16,280	100.0%
Republican hold			

=== District 36 ===
District 36 election, 2019
Party	Candidate	Votes	%
Democratic	Albert Butler (incumbent)	16,697	100.0%
Total votes		16,697	100.0%
Democratic hold			

=== District 37 ===
District 37 election, 2019
Party	Candidate	Votes	%
Republican	Melanie Sojourner	11,497	57.87%
Democratic	William Godfrey	8,370	42.13%
Total votes		19,867	100.0%
Republican gain from Democratic			

=== District 38 ===
District 38 election, 2019
Party	Candidate	Votes	%
Democratic	Tammy Witherspoon (incumbent)	15,470	100.0%
Total votes		15,470	100.0%
Democratic hold			

=== District 39 ===
District 39 election, 2019
Party	Candidate	Votes	%
Republican	Sally Doty (incumbent)	15,526	100.0%
Total votes		15,526	100.0%
Republican hold			

=== District 40 ===
District 40 election, 2019
Party	Candidate	Votes	%
Republican	Angela Burks Hill (incumbent)	12,307	76.63%
Democratic	Thomas Lehr	3,754	23.37%
Total votes		16,061	100.0%
Republican hold			

=== District 41 ===
District 41 election, 2019
Party	Candidate	Votes	%
Republican	Joey Fillingane (incumbent)	16,787	100.0%
Total votes		16,787	100.0%
Republican hold			

=== District 42 ===
District 42 election, 2019
Party	Candidate	Votes	%
Republican	Chris McDaniel (incumbent)	15,728	100.0%
Total votes		15,728	100.0%
Republican hold			

=== District 43 ===
District 43 election, 2019
Party	Candidate	Votes	%
Republican	Dennis DeBar (incumbent)	14,679	100.0%
Total votes		14,679	100.0%
Republican hold			

=== District 44 ===
District 44 election, 2019
Party	Candidate	Votes	%
Republican	John A. Polk (incumbent)	14,388	100.0%
Total votes		14,388	100.0%
Republican hold			

=== District 45 ===
District 45 election, 2019
Party	Candidate	Votes	%
Republican	Chris Johnson	13,980	100.0%
Total votes		13,980	100.0%
Republican hold			

=== District 46 ===
District 46 election, 2019
Party	Candidate	Votes	%
Republican	Philip Moran (incumbent)	12,794	100.0%
Total votes		12,794	100.0%
Republican hold			

=== District 47 ===
District 47 election, 2019
Party	Candidate	Votes	%
Republican	Mike Seymour (incumbent)	11,466	100.0%
Total votes		11,466	100.0%
Republican hold			

=== District 48 ===
District 48 election, 2019
Party	Candidate	Votes	%
Republican	Mike Thompson	6,598	51.59%
Democratic	Gary Fredericks	6,192	48.41%
Total votes		12,790	100.0%
Republican gain from Democratic			

=== District 49 ===
District 49 election, 2019
Party	Candidate	Votes	%
Republican	Joel Carter (incumbent)	12,810	100.0%
Total votes		12,810	100.0%
Republican hold			

=== District 50 ===
District 50 election, 2019
Party	Candidate	Votes	%
Republican	Scott DeLano		100.0%
Total votes			100.0%
Republican hold			

=== District 51 ===
District 51 election, 2019
Party	Candidate	Votes	%
Republican	Jeremy England	11,832	100.0%
Total votes		11,832	100.0%
Republican hold			

=== District 52 ===
District 52 election, 2019
Party	Candidate	Votes	%
Republican	Brice Wiggins (incumbent)	11,149	100.0%
Total votes		11,149	100.0%
Republican hold			
