= Marion Smith =

American politician from Mississippi (born 1932)

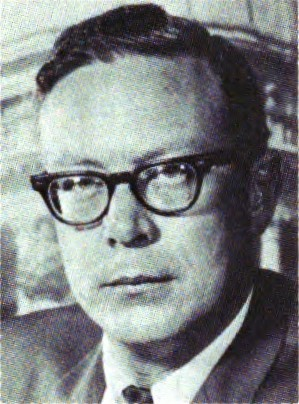
- 1968

President pro tempore of the Mississippi State Senate
- In office January 1971 – January 1972
- Preceded by: Merle Palmer
- Succeeded by: B. G. Perry

Member of the Mississippi State Senate from the 30th district
- In office January 1960 – January 1972

Personal details
- Born: February 2, 1932 (age 94) Natchez, Mississippi

William Marion Smith (born February 2, 1932) is a former Mississippi politician who served as a Democrat in the Mississippi Senate between 1960–1972. From 1971 to 1972, Smith was the President pro Tempore of the Mississippi State Senate. He also served at one point as interim Governor.

He was an attorney who taught at the University of Mississippi School of Law. He has served as president of the Ole Miss Alumni Association, the Inter-Alumni Council of Institutions of Higher Learning and the Mississippi Historical Society, among other organizations.

== Early life ==
William Marion Smith was born on February 2, 1932, in Natchez, Mississippi. He graduated from Natchez High School, and received B.A. and J.D. degrees from the University of Mississippi.
