= Douglas Leavon Anderson =

American educator and politician

Member of the Mississippi State Senate from the 27th district
- In office January 8, 1980 – November 19, 1993
- Preceded by: Jim Noblin
- Succeeded by: Hillman T. Frazier

Member of the Mississippi House of Representatives from the 31-C district
- In office January 6, 1976 – January 8, 1980
- Preceded by: Hickman Johnson
- Succeeded by: Hillman T. Frazier

Personal details
- Born: February 18, 1939 Hinds County, Mississippi, U.S.
- Died: April 13, 2013 (aged 74)
- Party: Democratic

Douglas Leavon Anderson (February 18, 1939 – April 13, 2013) was an American educator and politician from Mississippi. Anderson, a Democrat, was first elected to the Mississippi House of Representatives in 1976. He served in that office until 1980, when he won election to the Mississippi State Senate. He served in the State Senate until 1992.

Anderson was born in Hinds County, Mississippi. He attended Dillard University (B.S.) and Oklahoma University (M.S.).

Elected in 1976, Anderson, Horace Buckley and Fred Banks were among the first four African-Americans elected to the Mississippi Legislature in the twentieth century after Robert G. Clark Jr., who was elected in 1967. He served from 1994 until his death in 2013 on the Hinds County Board of Supervisors.

Anderson taught in public schools in Meridian, Mississippi and his native Jackson, Mississippi and as an associate professor of mathematics at Jackson State University from 1965 to 1987.
