= Leslie King =

Leslie King may refer to:

- Gerald Ford (1913–2006), born Leslie Lynch King, Jr., 38th president of the United States of America
  - Leslie Lynch King Sr. (1884–1941), biological father of Gerald Ford
- Leslie King (footballer) (born 1963), New Zealand women's footballer
- Leslie D. King (born 1949), Mississippi Supreme Court justice and former state legislator
- Leslie King (actor) (1876–1947), American actor
- Leslie King (cyclist) (1950–2009), Olympic cyclist for Trinidad and Tobago at the 1968 Summer Olympics
- Leslie King (sometimes credited as Leslie E. King), American actress, known for the 1978 film Cotton Candy and writer of the 1989 film To Die For and its sequel
