= Noal Akins =

American politician (1938–2022)

Member of the Mississippi House of Representatives from the 12th district
- In office January 3, 2004 – January 2, 2012
- Succeeded by: Brad Mayo

Personal details
- Born: August 21, 1938 Blue Mountain, Mississippi, U.S.
- Died: October 30, 2022 (aged 84) Oxford, Mississippi, U.S.
- Party: Republican
- Education: University of Mississippi
- Profession: Businessman

Noal Akins (August 21, 1938 — October 30, 2022) was an American Republican politician originally from Blue Mountain, Mississippi. He served four terms in the Mississippi House of Representatives from 2004 to 2012. He is a graduate of the University of Mississippi at Oxford.

After her successful election in the 2019 general election, his daughter, Nicole Akins Boyd, became a member of the Mississippi State Senate.

Noal Akins died in Oxford, Mississippi on October 30, 2022, at the age of 84.
