= Nicole Akins Boyd =

American politician

Member of the Mississippi Senate from the 9th district
- Incumbent
- Assumed office January 7, 2020
- Preceded by: Gray Tollison

Personal details
- Party: Republican
- Spouse: Daniel
- Children: 2
- Parent(s): Noal Akins (father); Joyce Akins (mother)
- Education: Oxford High School Mississippi State University (BS) University of Mississippi (JD)

Nicole Akins Boyd (born January 19, 1969) is an American attorney, business woman, teacher, volunteer, and politician. She is a Republican who has served the 9th district in the Mississippi State Senate since 2020.

== Life and education ==
Boyd grew up in Oxford, Mississippi. She is the daughter of Lafayette County Extension Home Economist, Joyce Akins and Noal Akins, who was an educator, coach, businessman, and former representative of the 12th district in the Mississippi House of Representatives from 2004 to 2012. She graduated from Oxford High School, received a B.S. from Mississippi State University, and earned a Juris Doctor degree from the University of Mississippi School of Law.

Boyd is married to Dr. Daniel Boyd, a local physician and small-business owner, and they have two children. Her family resides in Oxford, and she is of the Baptist faith.

== Career ==
In the 1990s, Boyd served as a Special Assistant Attorney General in Mississippi where she litigated to protect the state's natural resources and Sixteenth Section lands and advocated for children and family issues. While working for the Attorney General, she served as the Division Director of the Youth Services Division which passed legislation and enforced laws to protect minors from alcohol and tobacco and worked on a variety of issues including school safety, substance abuse, and childhood wellness; she also served on the National Association of Attorney General's Environmental Chiefs Work Group. In 1998, Boyd helped establish and lead the Partnership for a Healthy Mississippi. As the director of this non-profit health care organization, the organization's work and dedication led to an 88% reduction in Mississippi teenage smoking rates. The organization also worked in Mississippi classrooms developing educational materials to integrate into the existing state curriculum which included a program to compensate teachers for training time and reward them for developing additional materials.

As a mother of a child with special needs, Boyd has volunteered over the past 13 years as an attorney and counselor to Mississippi families of special needs children as well as advocated at almost every level of government specifically testified before Congress to successfully get legislation passed regarding education, insurance, and disability reform. She was appointed by the Governor, Lt. Governor, Speaker of the House of Representatives, and State Superintendent of Education to serve and led numerous state educational, autism, and early childhood boards and tasks forces. These boards and tasks forces include the MS Autism Task Force, MS Autism Advisory Board, where she served as the Vice Chair, MS Special Education Advisory Committee, where she served as the Vice Chair and later chair, MS Department of Education's Special Education Task Force, MS Department of Education's Work Group on Literacy, MS Department of Education's Work Group on IEP Revisions, and Governor's Task Force on Early Childhood. She has also served on the Mississippi Applied Behavior Analysis (ABA) Licensure Board and worked as a Paralegal Studies Instructor for Jackson State University and Adjunct Professor for the University of Southern Mississippi teaching special education law.

Within the state, Boyd previously served on the Mississippi Women Lawyers Association Executive Board. In addition to her legal career, she has been involved in her community. She served 6 years on the Oxford Tourism Board as a member and 1 year as chair, chaired Oxford's Alcohol Safety Task Force Commission, and served as a member on Oxford's Sunday Alcohol Sales Task Force. Currently, she serves on the Board of the Oxford University Bank (OUB) and as a member of the Oxford Garden Club.

== Political career ==
In 2019, Boyd announced her candidacy to represent the 9th district, which includes a majority of Lafayette County and a portion of Panola County, in the Mississippi State Senate after Gray Tollison, who served for 24 years, decided not to run for re-election. She was unopposed in the Republican primary, and defeated Democrat Kevin Frye in the general election with 58.2% of the vote. She assumed office on January 7, 2020.

Boyd sits on the following Senate committees:

- Universities and College (Vice Chair)
- Technology
- Insurance
- Housing
- Judiciary, Division A
- Education
- Legislative Budget
- Finance
- Tourism

Nicole has sponsored and cosponsored legislation enacted into law ranging from workforce development, assistance to those with communication disorders, teacher pay increase, computer science education, consumer insurance legislation, telemedicine expansion, dyslexia, veterans issues, dementia, and economic development. Nicole was honored in 2020 to receive the Legislator of the Year Award from the Small Business Federation for her work with small businesses and their employees during the pandemic.

In 2022, Boyd was appointed to chair the nine-member bipartisan Senate Study Group on Women, Children, and Families created by Lt. Governor Delbert Hosemann to study the needs of Mississippi's women, children, and families after the overturning of Roe v. Wade abortion rights along with Senators Kevin Blackwell (R), Hob Bryan (D), Dean Kirby (R), Rod Hickman (D), Angela Burks Hill (R), Chad McMahan (R), Angela Turner-Ford (D), and Brice Wiggins (R).

In 2023, Nicole received the Mississippi Thrive! Champion for Children Award and the Health Care Leadership Award from the Community Health Centers.

On January 7, 2023, Boyd announced that she is seeking re-election for her seat where she is challenged in the Republican Primary by career forester, Ricky Caldwell. The primary election will take place on August 8, 2023, from 7am to 7pm.
