= Senator Hopson =

Senator Hopson may refer to:

- Briggs Hopson (born 1965), Mississippi State Senate
- Eben Hopson (1922–1980), Alaska State Senate
