= Sollie Norwood =

American politician (born 1952)

Member of the Mississippi State Senate from the 28th district
- Incumbent
- Assumed office March 4, 2013
- Preceded by: Alice Harden

Personal details
- Born: August 5, 1952 (age 74) Florence, Mississippi
- Party: Democratic
- Children: 2
- Education: Jackson State University (BA) (MscEd)

Sollie B. Norwood (born August 5, 1952) is an American politician who has served in the Mississippi State Senate from the 28th district since 2013.

A graduate of Jackson State University, Norwood held a variety of public service and administrative roles, including serving as president of the Jackson State University Staff Senate, as a member and president of the Jackson School Board, and as director of the Division of Community Services within the Mississippi Department of Human Services. He works as a realtor.

== Early life and education ==
Norwood was born in Florence, Mississippi, on August 5, 1952. He attended Good Hope Elementary School and McLaurin High School in Florence.

He graduated from Jackson State University with a Bachelor of Arts in sociology in 1974 and a Master's of Science in Education in guidance and counseling in 1977. He continued his education at the University of Mississippi, focusing on student personnel in higher education.

== Career ==
In the early 1980s, he worked as a dormitory counselor and coordinator for Upward Bound at Jackson State University. He also worked at Mississippi Power for some time. In 1985, he was elected the Jackson State Staff Senate president in 1985.

In the early 1990s, he was the Interim Director of the Division of Community Services for the Department of Human Services before becoming the full-time director in 1992. In the position, he managed four statewide programs, totaling over $20 million in state funding. He concluded this role around the time he became a state senator.

He has also worked as a realtor.

=== Political offices ===
In 1985, he ran in the special election for District 69 in the Mississippi House of Representatives to replace Fred L. Banks. During the campaign, he pushed for increasing teacher pay, more benefits for the elderly, and support for small businesses. Of the 9 candidates, he made it to the runoff against Alyce Clarke, a fellow political novice. Clarke defeated Norwood, who secured around 40 percent of the vote. He unsuccessfully challenged her again in 1987, running as an independent.

Norwood was nominated and confirmed to the Jackson School Board in 2006 by former Jackson mayor Frank Melton. Becoming the board president, his term on the board concluded in March 2010.

In 2013, he defeated Marshand Crisler, a former Jackson councilman, in a special election runoff for District 28 in the Mississippi State Senate, a seat previously held by Alice Harden until her death. He was inaugurated in March 2013.

== Personal life ==
He is widowed with two children. He is Baptist.

He is a member of the NAACP and Phi Beta Sigma fraternity, where he has held varying levels of chapter leadership. Norwood is a 33rd Degree Prince Hall Mason.
