= Cecil L. Simmons =

Former American politician

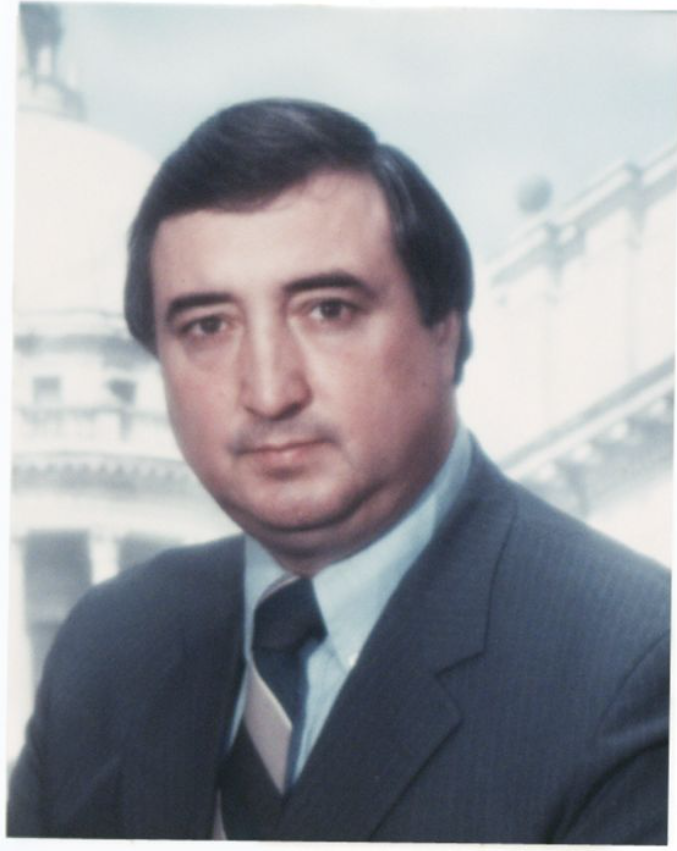
- Simmons in 1988

1st Speaker pro tempore of the Mississippi House of Representatives
- In office January 14, 1987 – January 1992
- Preceded by: Buddie Newman (non-permanent)
- Succeeded by: Robert G. Clark Jr.

Member of the Mississippi House of Representatives from the 37th (1984–1992) district 39th (1980–1984) 23rd (1972–1980)
- In office January 1972 – September 30, 1998
- Succeeded by: Rob Roberson

Personal details
- Born: August 25, 1946 (age 79) Macon, Mississippi, U.S.
- Party: Democratic
- Children: 4

Cecil Lamar Simmons (born August 25, 1946) is an American politician, lawyer, and entomologist. He served in the Mississippi House of Representatives from 1972 to 1998 and was its first Speaker Pro tempore, serving from 1987 to 1992. Simmons became a leader in House reform and in 1987 led a coalition of House members to curtail the Speaker's powers, creating the position of Speaker pro tempore in the process. He then led opposition to the increasing power of the new speaker Tim Ford.

== Early life and career ==
Cecil Lamar Simmons was born on August 25, 1946, in Macon, Mississippi. He was the son of Cloyace Leon and Eula Simmons. He graduated from Noxubee County High School in Macon. He attended Mississippi State University, receiving B.S. and M.S. degrees. He worked during college at a cheese factory as his parents could not afford to pay for college. He then worked as a beekeeper and entomology consultant. In 1975, Simmons received a PhD in entomology from Mississippi State University. In 1976, Simmons and his wife moved to Maben, Mississippi, where they purchased the Tom Bailey Memorial Hospital. They sold the hospital to a private corporation in 1982.

== Political career ==
=== 1971–1975 ===
In 1971, Simmons ran to be one of five people representing the 23rd district, composed of Noxubee, Lowndes, and Oktibbeha Counties in the Mississippi House of Representatives for the 1972-1976 term. He defeated Mrs. Troy Bostwick in the August 1971 Democratic primary. He then won the general election, defeating candidates C. T. Crabtree and L. C. Phillips. During his term, Simmons served on the following committees: Agriculture; Conservation of Water Resources; Game and Fish; and Judiciary "B".

=== 1975–1979 ===
On November 4, 1975, Simmons defeated Republican Ann Tindal for re-election. During the 1976-1980 term, Simmons served in the following committees: Appropriations; Game & Fish; Judiciary "A"; Public Buildings; and Grounds & Lands. In 1979, Simmons offered an amendment to allow for House members to elect committee members (rather than have them be chosen by the Speaker), but the amendment failed with a 25-88 vote. Also in 1979, Simmons proposed a bill that would end state funding for charity hospitals, referring to them as "fourth-class facilities" providing "fourth-class care".

=== 1979–1984 ===
In August 1979, Simmons ran in the Democratic Primary, this time to represent District 39 (Oktibbeha County). Simmons received 2774 votes, while opponents Joe Mosely and Allen Pugh received 2112 and 774 votes respectively. Simmons then defeated Mosely in the runoff election. In the 1980-1984 session, Simmons served in the following committees: Agriculture; Appropriations; Judiciary "A"; Pensions; Social Welfare & Public Health; Public Buildings; and Grounds and Lands.

In February 1980, Simmons sponsored a bill to make the honeybee the state insect of Mississippi. The bill was passed by Governor William Winter on April 1, 1980. Simmons attempted to generate legislative attention towards ending charity hospitals in the state and, when unsuccessful, used his Appropriations Committee status to cut funding for some of them. However, the cutting of funds was ended in June when Speaker C. B. Newman instead created a seven-member committee to study charity hospitals and report back to the House. Simmons was a member of this committee, which investigated the hospitals in September 1980. By 1981, Simmons still opposed the hospitals, although a majority of the committee was in favor of retaining them.

In December 1983, at the tail end of the session, Simmons joined Eric Clark and other representatives in a group attempting to curtail the powers of the Speaker of the House. These members, of whom Simmons had served the longest, would propose new rules at the beginning of the 1984 session. Instead of the Speaker of the House having the power to choose all committee members, instead, the entire legislature would elect the House Rules Committee (whose members would be distributed across the state), whose members would then elect all Committee members and chairs. Simmons gave a "stirring speech for reform".

=== 1983–1987 ===
In August 1983, Simmons defeated James M. Ward in the Democratic primary for renomination. Simmons represented the 37th District in this term. On the first day of the 1984 session, Simmons and the legislators were not able to effect the changes in rules. Speaker C. B. Newman removed Simmons from the Appropriations and Health & Welfare Committees. Simmons and other members of the "terrible twenty-six", as they became known, were removed from important committee assignments. In order to take advantage of the lack of important committee assignments and meetings, Simmons and his wife attended the Mississippi College School of Law. In 1986, two camps began to oppose the extreme power of Speaker Newman: the "House 26" from before, and a group of veteran legislators (led by Ralph Doxey and Mike Nipper) who had originally supported Newman in 1984. Simmons was a member of both groups, and was able to bring them together into a single coalition. In December 1986 the group created a "rules change package" with many of the proposed changes. These propositions included making the Rules Committee elective, choosing Appropriations and Ways & Means committee members on a seniority basis, creating a 10-year limit on Speaker terms, and creating a new permanent position of Speaker pro tempore. This was passed on January 9, 1987 on a 75-45 vote. Then, on January 15, 1987, Simmons was elected to be the first permanent Speaker pro tempore of the House, defeating Nipper with a 67-41 vote. Due to his status as a law school student, Simmons announced that he did not desire to run for Speaker in the following term.

=== 1987–1991 ===
Simmons was re-elected to the 37th District for this term. During this term, Simmons successfully endorsed Tim Ford for the position of Speaker, as a "consensus candidate" between the "old guard" and the reformers. Simmons was "almost automatically" elected to the office of Speaker pro tempore. During this term, Simmons was (as Speaker pro tempore) the ex officio Chairman of the Management and Rules committees. He also was a member of the following committees: Appropriations; Interstate Cooperation; Military Affairs; Public Buildings; and Grounds & Lands. While Simmons and Ford were close at the start of the session, over time they grew apart. In 1989 Simmons said of Ford, "[He] hasn't disappointed me any ... but some of his friends in the House have disappointed me because they have tried to steer him in the direction they want him to go." These "friends" ostensibly included Mississippi "old guard" member and a former opponent of Ford's election to Speaker, Sonny Merideth. At the start of the 1990 session, Ford tried to roll back some of the measures Simmons had introduced and give the Speaker more power, which led to a split between Ford and Simmons. The measures, which would have included the speaker reclaiming control over the Management committee, failed by one vote.

=== 1991–1995 ===
In the August 1991 primaries for this term, Simmons ran for Speaker pro tempore, and "openly endorsed" Ed Perry, who was running against Tim Ford for Speaker. Ford had chosen Robert Clark as his running mate for Speaker pro tempore. Simmons was the "chief vote counter for the anti-Ford forces". At the start of the session in January 1992, Simmons was defeated by Clark for the office of Speaker pro tempore (in a 38-83 vote), and Ford was elected Speaker. In November 1992, Simmons was re-elected for the 37th District for the 1993-1996 term.

In January 1993, the two-term limit on Speakership tenure installed by Simmons was removed by the House on a 76-43 vote. In 1995, Simmons responded by petitioning members to reinstate the term length of the Speaker, citing the Speaker's Expense Fund as an example of how they can be susceptible to corruption. If the term limits were passed, then 1995 would have been Ford's final session as Speaker. However, Simmons was unsuccessful as only 26 of 122 members voted for reinstating term limits.

=== 1996–1998 ===
Simmons was re-elected for the 1996-2000 term, representing the 37th District. During this term, Simmons was the Vice Chairman of the Municipalities Committee. He also served on the following committees: Appropriations; Conservation; Public Health; and Judiciary A. However, Simmons's vice chairmanship of the Municipalities Committee (given by Speaker Tim Ford) was seen as a "broom closet" assignment by some as the committee rarely met. In 1998, Simmons led failed efforts to curtail the expansion of hog farming. In April 1998, Ford announced his candidacy for the office of chancery judge in order to be closer to his family. Simmons officially resigned from the House on September 30, 1998, in order to run. On November 17, he lost to attorney James "Jimmy" Gore in a runoff election for the position. He was replaced in the House by Republican bed and breakfast owner Rob Roberson.

=== 1998–present ===
After losing the judgeship election, Simmons announced that he would be practicing law and spending more time with his family. Simmons retired from his law practice in 2003.

In July 2003, Simmons announced his candidacy to represent the 15th District in the Mississippi State Senate. In the general election on November 4, Simmons lost to Gary Jackson, receiving 44% of the votes (with 87% of precincts reporting) compared to Jackson's 56%.

In February 2014, Simmons was honored at a reception recognizing himself, Clark, and J. P. Compretta as the three living former Speakers pro tempore. Their portraits were hung in the House Management Committee meeting room.

Simmons ran again for District 15 in 2015, and was unopposed in the Democratic primary. Once again, Jackson defeated Simmons, with Jackson receiving 60.7% of the vote, and Simmons getting 39.3%.

== Personal life ==
Simmons is a Baptist. Simmons married Winnie Sue Haley, a doctor, in 1974. They have four children.
