= James E. Graves Jr. =

American judge (born 1953)

James Graves
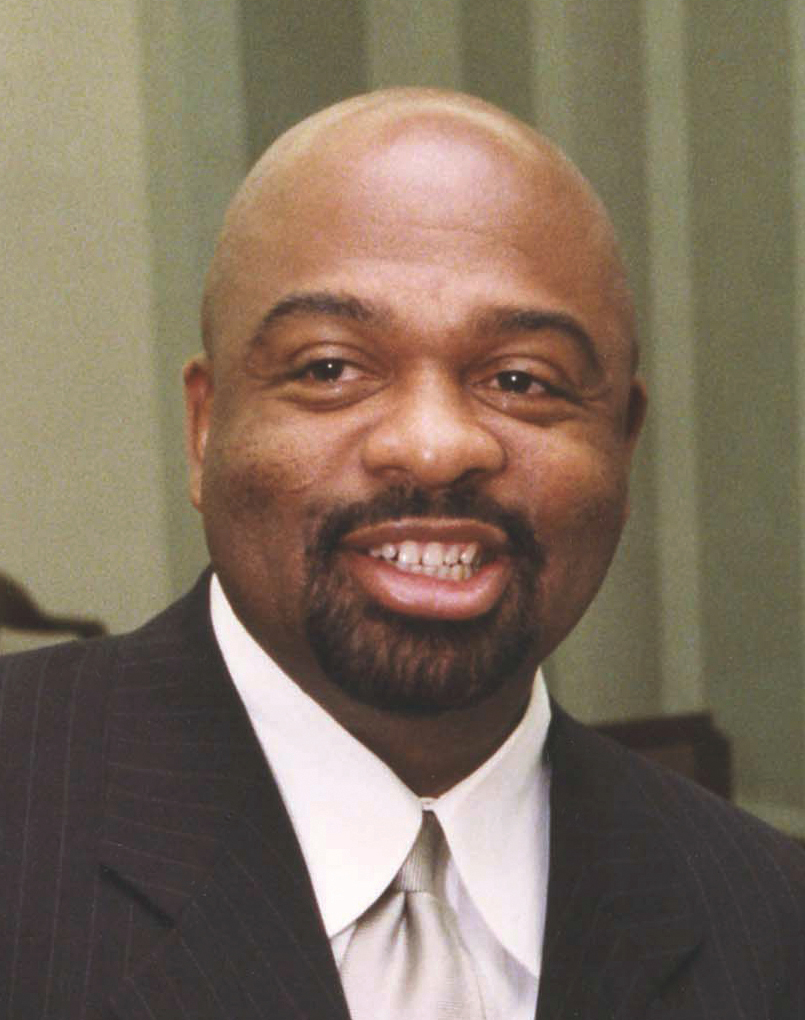

Judge of the United States Court of Appeals for the Fifth Circuit
- Incumbent
- Assumed office February 15, 2011
- Appointed by: Barack Obama
- Preceded by: Rhesa Barksdale

Associate Justice of the Mississippi Supreme Court
- In office November 1, 2001 – February 15, 2011
- Appointed by: Ronnie Musgrove
- Preceded by: Fred L. Banks Jr.
- Succeeded by: Leslie D. King

Personal details
- Born: James Earl Graves Jr. 1953 (age 72–73) Clinton, Mississippi, U.S.
- Education: Millsaps College (BA); Syracuse University (JD, MPA)

James Earl Graves Jr. (born 1953) is an American lawyer who serves as a United States circuit judge of the United States Court of Appeals for the Fifth Circuit.

== Early life and education ==
The son of a Baptist minister, Graves was born and raised in Clinton, Mississippi. He attended Sumner High School in Clinton and graduated as valedictorian with the highest grade point average and ACT score in his class. Graves then attended Millsaps College and graduated in 1975 with a Bachelor of Arts degree in Sociology. After working at the Mississippi Department of Public Welfare for almost two years, he enrolled at Syracuse University College of Law, where he received his Juris Doctor in 1980. He also earned a Master of Public Administration degree from the Maxwell School of Citizenship and Public Affairs at Syracuse University in 1981. He is a practicing Seventh-day Adventist.

== Legal and academic career ==
Graves began his legal career as a staff attorney at Central Mississippi Legal Services in 1980. He then worked in the private practice of law for three years, before returning to public service work. Graves served as legal counsel for both the health law division and the human services division of the Mississippi Attorney General's Office. He also worked as a special assistant attorney general for the State of Mississippi and served as the director of the division of child support enforcement in the Mississippi Department of Human Services. Graves has served as a Teaching Team Member of the Trial Advocacy Workshop at Harvard Law School since 1998. He has also held the position of adjunct professor at Millsaps College, Tougaloo College, and Jackson State University. Graves has taught courses in media law, civil rights law, and sociology of law and was jurist-in-residence at Syracuse University School of Law, through 2021. Graves has also coached high school, college, and law school mock trial teams, including the Jackson Murrah High School mock trial team that won the 2001 state championship.

== Judicial career ==
=== Mississippi state judicial service ===
In 1991, Governor Ray Mabus appointed Graves as a circuit court judge of Hinds County. Graves was then elected to the position later that year in a special election, in which he received seventy-seven percent of the votes cast. Graves was later re-elected without opposition in 1994 and 1998.

In 2001, Governor Ronnie Musgrove appointed Graves to the Mississippi Supreme Court. Graves later won election to the court in 2004. At the time, he was the only African-American justice on the court. The first African-Americans to serve on the Mississippi Supreme Court were Reuben V. Anderson, who served from 1985 to 1990, followed by Fred L. Banks Jr. from 1991 to 2001.

=== Federal judicial service ===
On June 10, 2010, President Barack Obama nominated Graves to be a United States circuit judge of the United States Court of Appeals for the Fifth Circuit to replace Judge Rhesa Barksdale, who assumed senior status on August 8, 2009. Although approved by Senate Judiciary Committee on December 1, 2010, the Senate failed to act on the nomination. Obama renominated Graves in January 2011, and the Senate confirmed him on February 14, 2011, making him the third African-American judge on the Fifth Circuit, after Carl E. Stewart and Joseph W. Hatchett. He received his commission on February 15, 2011.

=== Notable decisions ===
- Dolgencorp, Inc. v. Mississippi Band of Choctaw Indians (2014): Judge Graves wrote the majority opinion (2-1) in which the panel held there was tribal court jurisdiction over a young tribal member’s tort claims against a Dollar General Store for its alleged negligent hiring, training, and oversight of a manager who allegedly sexually molested the tribe member during an unpaid internship. As a general rule, tribal jurisdiction and sovereignty does not extend to claims against nonmembers of the tribe. But relying on the Supreme Court’s Montana v. United States, 450 U.S. 544, and the exceptions to the general rule, Graves concluded Dollar General entered into a consensual relationship with the tribe by participating in a youth opportunity program. The program provided young tribe members with short, unpaid internships and training while Dollar General received unpaid labor. He further concluded the tribe member’s claims related to the consensual relationship, i.e., he alleged he was assaulted by a supervisor when he was in the program and worked at Dollar General. By concluding the “consensual relationship” exception permitted tribal jurisdiction over the tribe member’s claims, the panel affirmed the denial of Dollar General’s motion for an injunction to stop the prosecution of the tribe member’s tort claims in tribal court. Although the decision was appealed to the Supreme Court, the judgment was affirmed by an equally divided court. Dollar General Corp. v. Ms. Band of Choctaw Indians, 579 U.S.545 (2016). The decision, at the time, was the first one from a federal appeals court endorsing a tribal court's exercise of jurisdiction over tort claims against a nonmember under Montana's consensual relationship exception.
- Inclusive Communities Project, Inc. v. Texas Dep't of Hous. & Cmty. Affs. (2014): Judge Graves wrote for the panel, in a matter of first impression, to adopt the burden-shifting standard in the Department of Housing and Urban Development (HUD) to govern the burdens of proof in disparate impact housing discrimination cases under the Fair Housing Act (FHA). The plaintiff organization alleged Texas issued its Section 8 housing credits in a manner that disproportionately awarded developments in minority neighborhoods and denied them in primarily white neighborhoods. This created a segregated housing pattern. The case was based on discriminatory impact (rather than intent), and the standards governing that type of claim differed among courts. Graves, however, recognized that the HUD had recently promulgated rules governing disparate impact FHA claims and expressly adopted the rules. In doing so, the panel reversed the trial court’s judgment and remanded to have the evidence considered under the new legal standard. The state appealed to the Supreme Court to challenge whether disparate impact claims are cognizable under the FHA. The Supreme Court affirmed and held disparate-impact claims are cognizable under the FHA.
- Lefebure v. D'Aquilla (2021): Judge Graves dissented in a 2-1 decision that refused to revive a lawsuit accusing a local prosecutor of mishandling the situation after a warden allegedly raped her. Graves wrote: "A right to be free from discriminatory law enforcement policies that enable crime is distinct from an affirmative right to prosecution. As the injury Lefebure asserts is one caused by a policy of discrimination, it implicates the chief original concern of equal protection."
- Harness v. Watson (2022): Graves dissented in an August 24, 2022 ruling that upheld a 1890 Mississippi law that disenfranchised a large number of felons. Graves called the law out for its racist history and spoke of his own experiences growing up in Jim Crow Mississippi. He wrote: "It is worth noting that § 241 stands virtually alone in its endurance against courts acting as protectors of constitutional rights. Mississippi’s other facially neutral but invidiously motivated laws and constitutional provisions have almost all been invalidated or superseded. Each of these provisions, like §241, was enacted to maintain white supremacy in Mississippi. But unlike § 241, these provisions were all struck down by federal judges upholding their oath to the Constitution. On § 241, Mississippians have simply not been given the chance to right the wrongs of its racist origins. And this court, in failing to right its own wrongs, deprives Mississippians of this opportunity by upholding an unconstitutional law enacted for the purpose of discriminating against Black Mississippians on the basis of their race."

== Honors and awards ==
- National Conference of Black Lawyers Judge of the Year Award - 1992
- National Bar Association Distinguished Jurist Award - 1996
- Hinds County Bar Association Innovation Award - 2000
- Jackson Public School District Parent of the Year Award - 2001
- State of Mississippi Parent of the Year Award, First Alternate - 2001
- United States Department of Health and Human Services Commissioner's Award - 2001
- Mississippi Association of Educators Humanized Education Award - 2002
- Mississippi Bar Foundation, Law-Related Public Education Award - 2002
  - For excellence in enhancing the public's understanding of the law and the legal system
- Millsaps College Livesay Award - 2004
- NAACP Mississippi Chapter Legal Award - 2004
- Maxwell School of Citizenship and Public Affairs Public Administration Award - 2009
- FBI Director's Community Leadership Award - 2011
  - In recognition of outstanding contributions to our nation's communities through unselfish dedication and leadership
- Member of the American Law Institute - 2015

== Personal life ==
Graves is married and has three children.

== See also ==
- List of African-American federal judges
- List of African-American jurists
- List of first minority male lawyers and judges in Mississippi

Legal offices
Preceded by Fred L. Banks Jr.	Associate Justice of the Mississippi Supreme Court; 2001–2011	Succeeded by Leslie D. King
Preceded by Rhesa Barksdale	Judge of the United States Court of Appeals for the Fifth Circuit; 2011–present	Incumbent
