= Clayton P. Henderson =

Mississippi legislator

Clayton P. Henderson (born June 30, 1954) was a state legislator in Mississippi from 1979 until 2003. He worked in the funeral and insurance businesses.

He was born in Mound Bayou. He lives in Tunica, Mississippi. His family has owned Henderson Funeral Home.

He graduated from Jackson State University and John A. Gupton College.

== See also ==
- 1988–1992 Mississippi Legislature
