= Tamarra Butler-Washington =

American politician

Tamarra Grace Butler-Washington

Member of the Mississippi House of Representatives from the 69th district
- Incumbent
- Assumed office January 2, 2024
- Preceded by: Alyce Clarke

Personal details
- Born: October 29, 1974 (age 51) Jackson, Mississippi
- Party: Democratic
- Spouse: Brian E. Washington
- Children: 1
- Education: Alcorn State University (BA), University of Southern Mississippi (MA)
- Occupation: Public Health
- Profession: Politician

Tamarra Butler-Washington serves as a member of the Mississippi House of Representatives for the 69th District, affiliating with the Democratic Party, a position she has held since 2024.

In her 2023 campaign, Butler-Washington's residence was targeted in a shooting incident.
