= Brad Mayo =

American politician

Member of the Mississippi House of Representatives from the 12th district
- In office January 3, 2012 – April 1, 2015
- Preceded by: Noal Akins
- Succeeded by: J.P. Hughes Jr.

Personal details
- Born: June 5, 1980 (age 46) Kansas City, Missouri, United States

Brad Mayo (born June 5, 1980) is an American Republican politician. He was a member of the Mississippi House of Representatives from the 12th District from 2011 through 2014.
