= Fred L. Banks Jr. =

American judge (born 1942)

Justice of the Mississippi Supreme Court
- In office 1991–2001
- Appointed by: Ray Mabus
- Preceded by: Reuben V. Anderson
- Succeeded by: James E. Graves Jr.

Judge of the Seventh Circuit District Court of Mississippi
- In office 1985–1991

Member of the Mississippi House of Representatives from the 69th district
- In office 1976–1985
- Succeeded by: Alyce Clarke

Personal details
- Born: Fred Lee Banks Jr. September 1, 1942 (age 83) Jackson, Mississippi, U.S.
- Education: Howard University (BBA, JD)

Fred Lee Banks Jr. (born September 1, 1942) is an American lawyer, civil rights activist, politician, and former Presiding Justice of the Supreme Court of Mississippi. He served on the court from 1991 to 2001. He served as a judge of the state's Seventh Circuit District Court from 1985-1991, and as a member of the state house of representatives from 1976-1985.

== Early life, education, and career ==
Banks grew up in Jackson, Mississippi, the son of Fred Lee Banks Sr. and Violet (Mabery) Banks. He graduated from Lanier High School in 1960.

He received a BBA from Howard University in Washington, D.C. followed by a JD from the Howard University School of Law, in 1968. He graduated cum laude, second in his class.

Banks "chose to enter the law to help African Americans achieve equality", and became one of the few African-American attorneys in Mississippi at the time of his graduation. After gaining admission to the bar in Mississippi, he entered into private practice in Jackson with several other attorneys. They acted as local counsel for the NAACP Legal Defense and Education Fund. He formed a law firm with several of those attorneys, Reuben Anderson, E.M. Nichols, and Melvyn R. Leventhal.

== Career ==
=== Legislative service ===
In 1975, Banks entered politics. He was elected to represent Hinds County in the Mississippi House of Representatives. He was twice re-elected. During his time in the House, Banks chaired the House Ethics Committee, the House Judiciary Committee, and the Legislative Black Caucus.

Banks, along with Representatives Horace L. Buckley and Douglas L. Anderson, also from Jackson, fought to preserve records from the pro-segregation Mississippi State Sovereignty Commission. They opposed a bill that would authorize the destruction of these records. The records documented how white supremacists had used state taxpayer money and resources to suppress civil rights activists and supporters, conducting a campaign of police harassment, boycotts, and economic discrimination against them.

Also during this period, on September 24, 1979, President Jimmy Carter announced his appointment of Banks as one of nine members of the National Advisory Council on the Education of Disadvantaged Children.

=== Judicial service ===
During his time as state representative, his former partner Reuben Anderson was elected as a Judge of the state Seventh Circuit District Court, encompassing Hinds and Yazoo counties.

In February 1985, after Governor William Allain had appointed Reuben Anderson to the Mississippi Supreme Court, he appointed Banks to complete Anderson's term on the 7th Circuit District. Banks was twice re-elected dto the circuit court without opposition.

In January 1991, following Anderson's resignation from the Mississippi Supreme Court, Governor Ray Mabus appointed Banks to serve until the November election. Banks was elected in November 1991 to serve the remainder of that term; he was re-elected to a full term in November 1996.

In 1993, Banks was mentioned as a potential nominee to the United States Court of Appeals for the Fifth Circuit, during the administration of President Bill Clinton. There were no African- American judges on the Fifth Circuit. Clinton ultimately appointed Louisiana state court judge Carl E. Stewart as the first African-American judge on the Fifth Circuit.

Banks retired from the state court in 2001. Thereafter he became a senior partner at the law firm of Phelps Dunbar.

Political offices
Preceded by Reuben Anderson	Justice of the Supreme Court of Mississippi; 1991–2001	Succeeded by James E. Graves Jr.
