= Thomas Norman Brooks =

American politician

Tommy Brooks
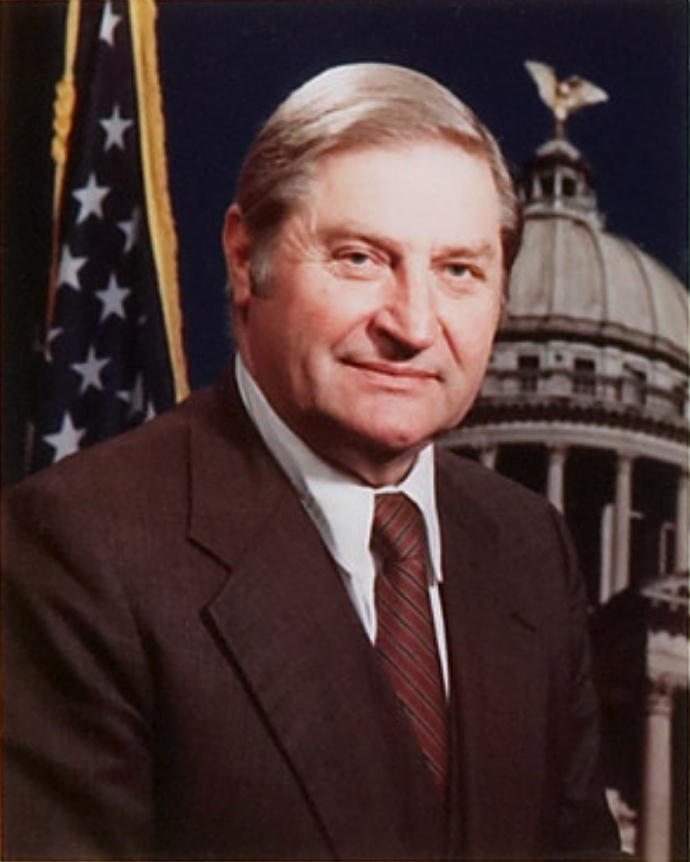

President pro tempore of the Mississippi State Senate
- In office January 1984 – June 6, 1985
- Preceded by: Bill Alexander
- Succeeded by: Glen Deweese

Member of the Mississippi State Senate
- In office January 1968 – June 6, 1985
- Succeeded by: Buddy Bond
- Constituency: 23rd district (1968–1972); 16th district (1972–1980); 30th district (1980–1984); 19th district (1984–1985)
- In office January 1960 – January 1964
- Constituency: 17th district

Member of the Mississippi House of Representatives from the Leake County district
- In office January 1952 – January 1960

Personal details
- Born: Thomas Norman Brooks; August 23, 1924 Walnut Grove, Mississippi
- Died: September 23, 1992 (aged 68) Leake County, Mississippi
- Party: Democratic

Military service
- Allegiance: United States
- Branch/service: United States Army
- Battles/wars: World War II

Thomas Norman Brooks (August 23, 1924 – September 23, 1992) was an American farmer and Democratic politician. He was a member of the Mississippi Legislature almost continuously from 1952 to 1985, when he was convicted and jailed for influence peddling. He also was the president pro tempore of the Mississippi State Senate from 1984 to his incarceration.

== Biography ==
Thomas Norman Brooks was born on August 23, 1924, in Walnut Grove, Mississippi. He graduated from Freeny High School and Millsaps College. He fought in the U. S. Army in World War II and received a Purple Heart. He represented Leake County in the Mississippi House of Representatives from 1952 to 1960. He then became a member of the Mississippi State Senate, representing the 17th district in the 1960–1964 term. He returned to the Senate in 1968, and served until 1985. In 1984, he became the president pro tempore of the Mississippi State Senate. However, in 1985, he was convicted for influence peddling, and spent 2 1/2 years in a minimum-security prison in Alabama. He died on September 23, 1992, in Freeny, Leake County, Mississippi.
