= List of first minority male lawyers and judges in Mississippi =

This is a list of the first minority male lawyers and judges in Mississippi, United States. It includes the year in which the men were admitted to practice law (in parentheses). Also included are men who achieved other distinctions such becoming the first in their state to graduate from law school or become a political figure.

== Firsts in state history ==
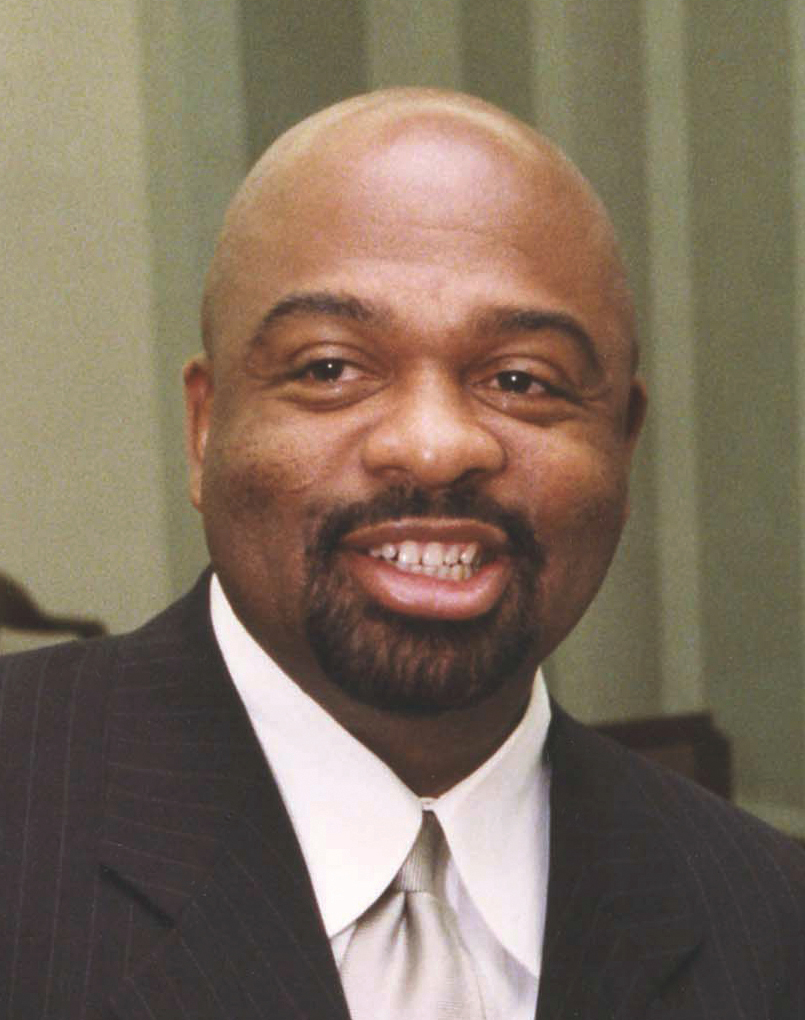
James E. Graves Jr. : First African American male Judge of the U.S. Court of Appeals for the Fifth Circuit in Mississippi (2011)

=== Lawyer ===
- James McDonald (1823): First Native American male lawyer in Mississippi
- James Henry Piles (1869): First African-American male lawyer in Mississippi

=== State judges ===
- John R. Lynch: First African American male to serve as a judicial officer in Mississippi (1869)
- Reuben V. Anderson (1967): First African-American male to serve as a judge since Reconstruction in Mississippi (1977) and on the Mississippi Supreme Court (1985)

=== Federal judges ===
- Halil Suleyman Ozerden: First Turkish American male to serve on the United States District Court for the Southern District of Mississippi (2007)
- James E. Graves Jr. (1980): First African-American male to serve on the U.S. Court of Appeals for the Fifth Circuit in Mississippi (2011)

=== United States Attorney ===
- Calvin "Buck" Buchanan: First African American male to serve as the United States Attorney (1996) [United States District Court for the Northern District of Mississippi]

=== Assistant United States Attorney ===
- Tyree Irving: First African American male to serve as an Assistant U.S. Attorney for Mississippi (1978) [Northern District of Mississippi]

=== District Attorney ===
- Willis E. Mollison (1887): First African American male to serve as a District Attorney in Mississippi (1893)

=== Assistant District Attorney ===
- Clell Ward: First African American to serve as an Assistant District Attorney in Mississippi (1975)

=== Bar Association ===
- Reuben V. Anderson (1967): First African American male to serve as the President of the Mississippi Bar Association

== Firsts in local history ==
- Scott Colom: First African American male to serve as the district attorney for a majority-white district in Mississippi (2015). He was the first African American to serve as the prosecutor for Columbus, Mississippi. He was also the African American male judge in Lowndes County, Mississippi (2011) and a municipal court judge in Aberdeen, Mississippi (2012) [Monroe County, Mississippi].
- Reuben V. Anderson (1967): First African-American male judge in Hinds County, Mississippi (1977)
- Louis Westerfield: First African American male to serve as the Dean of University of Mississippi School of Law (1994) [Lafayette County, Mississippi]
- Rickey Thompson: First African American male judge in Lee County, Mississippi
- Rod Hickman: First African American male to serve as the County Attorney of Noxubee County, Mississippi (2019)
- John Wilchie: First African American male to serve as a Justice Court Judge in Tallahatchie County, Mississippi
- R. Jess Brown: First African American male lawyer to defend a client before the Vicksburg Criminal Court (1954) [Warren County, Mississippi]
- Clell Ward: First African American to serve as the Assistant District Attorney of Washington County, Mississippi (1975)

== See also ==
- List of first minority male lawyers and judges in the United States

== Other topics of interest ==
- List of first women lawyers and judges in the United States
- List of first women lawyers and judges in Mississippi
