= Derrick Simmons (politician) =

American politician

Minority Leader of the Mississippi Senate
- Incumbent
- Assumed office July 31, 2017
- Preceded by: Bill Stone

Member of the Mississippi Senate from the 12th district
- Incumbent
- Assumed office March 2011
- Preceded by: Johnnie Walls

Personal details
- Born: Derrick Terrell Simmons; December 12, 1976 (age 49) Greenville, Mississippi, U.S.
- Party: Democratic
- Spouse: CuWanda Flowers
- Children: 1
- Education: Jackson State University (BBA); Howard University (MBA, JD)
- Website: Official website

Derrick Terrell Simmons (born December 12, 1976) is an American politician and trial lawyer serving in the Mississippi Senate for the 12th district since 2011. A member of the Democratic Party, he became the Minority Leader of the Mississippi Senate in 2017.

== Early life and education ==
Derrick Simmons was born on December 12, 1976 in Greenville, Mississippi. He graduated from T. L. Weston High School in 1995 as the valedictorian. He received a Bachelor of Business Administration in Accounting from Jackson State University in 2000 on a full scholarship; he finished first in his class.

He then enrolled at Howard University, graduating with an MBA in 2002 and a JD in 2005. He interned as an internal auditor for Northrop Grumman while at Howard for two years. At Howard University's Law School, he was part of the Mock Trial advocacy team, which defeated reigning champion Harvard Law school to become the first historically black law school to win the ABA International Mock Trial Competition.

== Career ==
After college, Simmons returned to the Mississippi Delta. He worked as a law clerk for the Circuit Court Judge and then became an Assistant Public Defender in the Washington County Public Defender's Office. Later, Simmons established a law firm in Greenville, Mississippi with his twin brother, Errick in 2008. He became the municipal court judge for Sunflower, Mississippi and Moorhead, Mississippi from 2009 to 2011.

Simmons served on the Greenville Public School District Board of Trustees from 2009 to 2011 and has taught as an adjunct professor since 2007 at Mississippi Valley State University in courses on business law, personal finance, and marketing.

He is affiliated with the American Bar Association, National Bar Association, Mississippi Bar, Magnolia Bar, District of Columbia Bar, and the Greenville Rotary Club.

=== Politics ===
After State Senator Johnnie Walls resigned from his seat to run for Circuit Court Judge in Bolivar County, Simmons decided to run for office.

On March 1, 2011, Simmons was elected to the Mississippi Senate in a special election to represent the 12th district. He ran unopposed in the 2011 and 2015 general election. In 2019, he ran against an independent candidate, receiving 81.5% of the vote. In 2023, he ran unopposed. The 12th district includes parts of Bolivar, Coahoma, and Washington counties.

In 2013, Simmons proposed a legislative amendment that would expand Medicaid; the amendment was defeated.

In 2017, he was elected Minority Leader of the Mississippi Senate.

In January 2022, Simmons led the walking out of all 14 black Mississippi senators, during a vote to ban the critical race theory from being taught in the state's public schools, colleges, and universities.

== Personal life ==
Simmons mother worked in grocery stores, while his father worked as a factory worker until dying in 2015.

He is married to CuWanda Flowers and is of Baptist faith. He has two children. Simmons has a twin brother, Errick Simmons, who is the current mayor of Greenville, Mississippi.

Simmons is a Mason, member of the NAACP, and part of Kappa Alpha Psi.

Mississippi State Senate
Preceded by Bill Stone	Minority Leader of the Mississippi Senate; 2017–present	Incumbent
