= Ollie Mohamed =

American politician

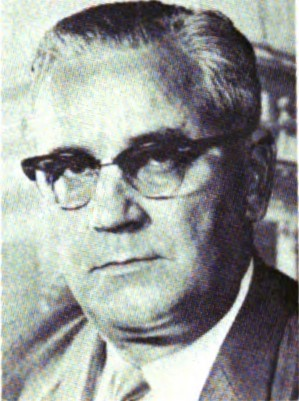
- 1968

President pro tempore of the Mississippi Senate
- In office January 1992 – January 1993
- Preceded by: Glen Deweese
- Succeeded by: Pud Graham

Member of the Mississippi Senate from the 21st district 19th (1968-1972) 30th (1964-1968)
- In office January 1980 – January 1993
- In office January 1964 – January 1972

Personal details
- Born: February 7, 1925 Shaw, Mississippi
- Died: April 6, 2008 (aged 83) Belzoni, Mississippi
- Party: Democrat
- Parent(s): Hassan Mohamed; Ethel Wright Mohamed

Ollie Mohamed (February 7, 1925 - April 6, 2008) was an American store owner and politician. He was a Democratic member of the Mississippi Senate in the mid-to-late 20th century and its President pro tempore in 1992.

== Early life ==
Ollie Mohamed was born on February 7, 1925, in Shaw, Mississippi. He was the oldest child and son of ethnically Syrian Lebanese-born Muslim merchant Hassan Mohamed and Ethel (Wright) Mohamed. Hassan's original name was Hassan Mohamed Shouman; his last name became his middle name due to a transcription error when he immigrated to the United States. Ollie and his siblings were raised as Baptists, their mother's faith. Mohamed attended Belzoni High School in Belzoni, Mississippi. In 1942, he was the first 18-year-old draft into World War II. Mohamed was a merchant and a farmer, and by 1994 was running a department store in Belzoni.

== Political career ==
In 1957, Mohamed's political career began when he ran for the office of alderman of Belzoni. He was elected to two terms in that office, ending in 1963 when he was elected to represent Mississippi's 30th state senate district. He served the term from 1964 to 1968. After the districts were re-districted, he then represented the 19th district in the Senate from 1968 to 1972. In 1971, he sponsored legislation to create the Mississippi Bureau of Narcotics. Mohamed ran for re-election in 1971 after terms were redistricted, but lost by 32 votes to Buddy Grisham. Mohamed ran for the Senate in 1975 as an Independent, but was not elected. He ran in 1979 and won election. He represented the state's 21st district in the Senate from 1980 to 1993. In 1992, he was the President pro tempore of the Mississippi Senate. When the districts were changed again in 1992, Mohamed lost for re-election in the new district to Barbara Blackmon. Immediately after losing the election Governor Kirk Fordice made Mohamed a legislative lobbyist. He died in his home in Belzoni, Mississippi, on April 6, 2008.

== Personal life ==
Mohamed was married to Annelle Horne. They had six children, and 10 grandchildren by 1994.

== Works cited ==
- Taggart, Andy (2019). "Kirk Fordice (1992-2000): Cutting Against the Grain" (PDF). The Journal of Mississippi History. LXXXI (1–2): 133–143. ISSN 0022-2771.
