= Jerry E. Wilkerson =

American farmer and legislator

Jerry E. Wilkerson (1944 – March 20, 2013) was an American farmer and legislator.

A farmer and cattleman, Wilkerson served in the Mississippi House of Representatives. He also was a spokesman for the convenience stores, propane, and petroleum industries.
