= David Blount =

American politician (born 1967)

David Lamar Blount
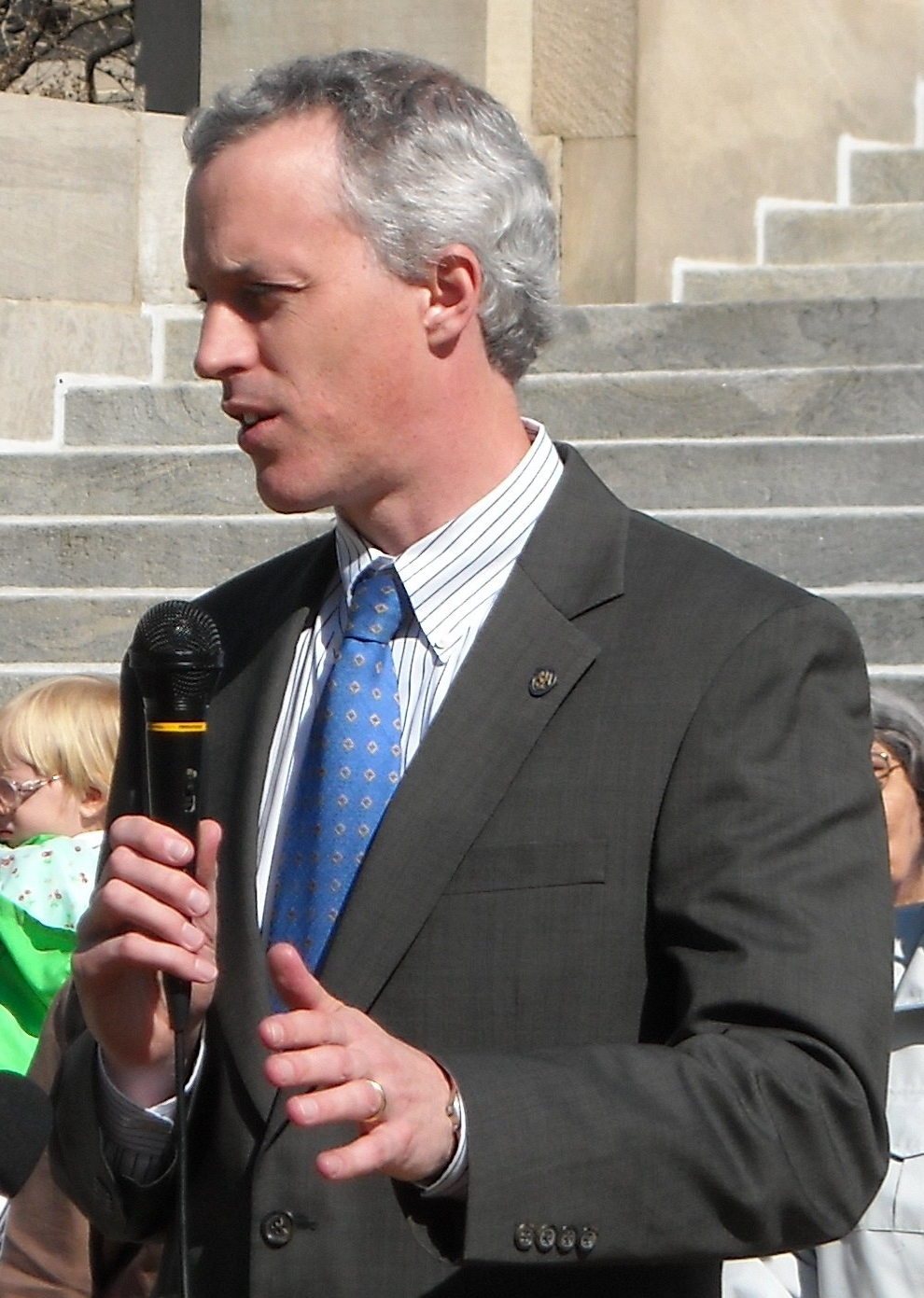

Member of the Mississippi Senate from the 29th district
- Incumbent
- Assumed office January 8, 2008
- Preceded by: Richard G. White

Personal details
- Born: July 19, 1967 (age 59) Jackson, Mississippi, U.S.
- Party: Democratic
- Children: 2
- Education: Davidson College (BA); University of Virginia (MA)
- Occupation: Commercial real estate

David Lamar Blount (born July 19, 1967) is a Democratic member of the Mississippi Senate, representing the 29th District since 2008. He is Vice Chairman of the Senate Democratic Caucus.

== Early life and education ==
Blount was born on July 19, 1967, in Hinds County. He is an eight-generation Mississippian. His father was a minister.

He grew up in Hinds County and graduated from Jackson Preparatory School, a segregation academy, in 1985. He graduated from Davidson College with a bachelor of arts in English. He played in intramural sports in college. He is also a graduate of the University of Virginia.

He works as a licensed real estate broker, which he specializes in commercial real estate.

== Career ==
Prior to his election to the Mississippi State Senate, Blount worked as the communications director for Mississippi Secretary of State Eric Clark for 13 years. He also served as vice president of Parents for Public Schools.

In 2007, he defeated two other Democratic opponents to win the Democratic primary for the 29th district, which represents part of Hinds County. He went on to defeat the Republican incumbent senator, Richard White, who had held the seat since 1989. Blount has been re-elected continuously since then against Republican opponents: in 2011 with 69 percent of the vote, 2015 with 79 percent, and 2023 with 78 percent of the vote. He won re-election in 2019 uncontested.

He currently serves as vice chair of the Senate Democratic Caucus.

== Personal life ==
Blount is married with two kids. He is Episcopalian.
