= Glen Deweese =

American politician

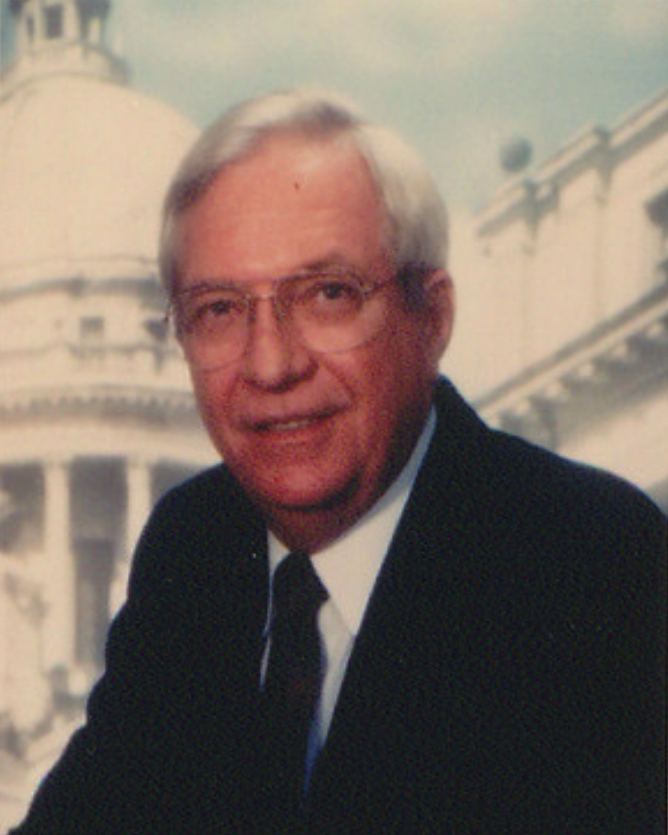

President pro tempore of the Mississippi State Senate
- In office January 1986 – January 1992
- Preceded by: Tommy Brooks
- Succeeded by: Ollie Mohamed

Member of the Mississippi State Senate
- In office January 1976 – January 1992
- Preceded by: Bert White
- Succeeded by: Joe Clay Hamilton
- Constituency: 19th district (1976–1980); 33rd district (1980–1992)

Personal details
- Born: Glen Sennett Deweese; January 5, 1932 Philadelphia, Mississippi, U.S.
- Died: September 27, 2001 (aged 69) Meridian, Mississippi, U.S.
- Party: Democratic
- Spouse: Janice Thomas

Glen Sennett Deweese (January 5, 1932 – September 27, 2001) was an American convenience store owner and Democratic politician. He was a member of the Mississippi State Senate from 1976 to 1992, and its president pro tempore from 1986 to 1992.

== Biography ==
Glen Sennett Deweese was born on January 5, 1932, in Philadelphia, Mississippi. He was first elected to the Mississippi State Senate in 1975 for the 1976-1980 term. In 1986, he became the President Pro Tempore of the Mississippi Senate, and served in the position from 1986 to 1992. His tenure in the Senate ended when he lost in the 1991 election. He died on September 27, 2001, in Meridian, Mississippi.
