= Gray Tollison =

American politician

President pro tempore of the Mississippi Senate
- In office January 11, 2019 – January 7, 2020
- Preceded by: Terry C. Burton
- Succeeded by: Dean Kirby

Member of the Mississippi Senate from the 9th district
- In office January 2, 1996 – January 7, 2020
- Preceded by: Kay B. Cobb
- Succeeded by: Nicole Boyd

Personal details
- Born: Grady Franklin Tollison; September 8, 1964 (age 62) Memphis, Tennessee, U.S.
- Party: Democratic (Before 2011); Republican (2011–present)
- Education: Rhodes College (BA); University of Mississippi, Oxford (JD)

Grady Franklin "Gray" Tollison (born September 8, 1964) is a Republican member of the Mississippi Senate, representing District 9 since 1996. In January 2012, Tollison was appointed Chairman of the Senate Education Committee by Lt. Governor Tate Reeves. From 2004 until 2012, he served as Chairman of the Judiciary, Division “B” Committee under the leadership of Lt. Governor Phil Bryant and Lt. Gov. Amy Tuck. He also serves as a member of the Rules, Finance, Public Health and Welfare, Universities and Colleges, and Wildlife, Fisheries and Parks Committees.

Tollison switched to the Republican Party on November 11, 2011, two days after winning his fifth election as a Democrat in the Mississippi Senate. This occurred only after Mississippi Republicans concurrently seized the control of House of Representatives & State Senate for the first time since the 1800s.

Tollison is a graduate of Oxford High School, Rhodes College and the University of Mississippi School of Law.

== See also ==
- List of American politicians who switched parties in office

Mississippi State Senate
Preceded by Terry C. Burton	President pro tempore of the Mississippi Senate; 2019–2020	Succeeded by Dean Kirby
