= B. G. Perry =

American politician

Bobby Gerald Perry (September 25, 1931 - July 30, 2016) was a lawyer, judge, and state legislator in Mississippi. He served in the Mississippi Senate including as President Pro Tempore with a stint as acting governor.

He was born in Memphis, Tennessee. Perry graduated from Horn Lake High School and studied at Memphis State University before serving in the United States Air Force for four years. He then earned a master's degree in journalism from Memphis State University and a law degree from the University of Mississippi. He passed the Mississippi Bar in January 1964.

He represented DeSoto County and Tate County in the Mississippi Senate from 1964 to 1976. He later worked for Mississippi governor Cliff Finch.

He lived in Southaven, Mississippi.
