= Nickey Browning =

American politician (1951–2024)

Member of the Mississippi State Senate from the 3rd district
- In office January 2, 1996 – January 7, 2020
- Preceded by: Pud Graham
- Succeeded by: Kathy Chism

Personal details
- Born: Nickey Reed Browning; July 19, 1951 Pontotoc, Mississippi, U.S.
- Died: October 29, 2024 (aged 73) Sanctuary Hospice House, Tupelo, Mississippi, U.S.
- Party: Republican (2013–2024); Democratic (before 2013)
- Spouse: Brenda Smithey
- Education: Northeast Mississippi Community College; Mississippi State University
- Occupation: Businessman

Nickey Reed Browning (July 19, 1951 – October 29, 2024) was an American politician who was a Republican member of the Mississippi Senate, having represented the 3rd District in northeastern Mississippi from 1996 to 2020.

== Early life and education ==
Browning was born in Ponotoc, Mississippi, on July 19, 1951. He attended Northeast Mississippi Community College and graduated from Mississippi State University.

== Political career ==
On March 27, 2013, Browning switched from the Democratic Party to the Republican Party. He did not file for re-election in 2020.

== Personal life and death ==
Browning was a member of the Lions Club. He was a Methodist.

Browning resided in Ecru in Pontotoc County, near Tupelo, Mississippi. He died on October 29, 2024, at the age of 73.

== See also ==
- List of American politicians who switched parties in office
