= Frank Ely =

Filipino musician

- Born: Frank Cuyag
- Genres: Folk; indie pop; OPM
- Occupations: Singer; songwriter; musician
- Years active: 2021–present
- Label: Evosound

Frank Cuyag, professionally as Frank Ely, is a Filipino singer, songwriter and musician. He is known for creating songs influenced by folk and indie pop, with elements of kundiman. He first became known through his single "Kay Ganda Mo" and later released "Maisayaw", which was issued in a postcard vinyl format.

== Career ==
Ely released his self-titled debut mini-album in 2021. At the same time, he started putting out songs independently, following the harana-style of songwriting. His single "Kay Ganda Mo" later earned millions of streams on Spotify. In the same year, he released "Minamahal", featuring Filipino lyrics and melodies inspired by 1960s music.

On October 17, 2024, Ely released "Maisayaw" under Evosound Philippines. The song was originally written in 2023 and completed after he signed with the label. It was produced by Paulo Agudelo. The single was issued in a limited postcard vinyl format with 300 copies made. The design was inspired by record postcards popular in Europe during the 1960s and 1970s and could be played on a standard turntable. On October 24, Ely will collaborate with local indie band Ame on a new single titled "Balang Araw". On December 27, a music video for "Maisayaw" was directed and edited by Tim Tupa. It was filmed at Mono by Phono in Makati and featured Ely alongside Michaella Busa.

In the same year, Ely released the single "Kailangan Mo Ba Ang Puso Ko" on June 7, following his extended play (EP) Homemade Love Songs, which came out earlier on February 9.

In 2025, Ely released the single "Namimiss" and mentioned that a follow-up EP to his debut project was being prepared. That same month, he recorded a cover of "Bato Sa Buhangin" with SHANNi. He has also appeared on live performance platforms, including the Wish 107.5 Bus, where he performed his single "Miss Kita".

In 2026, Ely released the single "Pwede Ka Ba?", a four-minute track about courting a long-time crush. Franchesca Basbas of Billboard Philippines said the song shows dancing under the moon and stars and imagining a future together, capturing the feelings of a new romance.

== Artistry ==
Ely described his music as kundiman and harana style with sounds drawn from folk and indie pop. His songs use simple arrangements and Tagalog lyrics. As a child, he listened to Rey Valera and Freddie Aguilar, and their music influenced the way he writes. Most of his songs focus on romance and courtship.

== Discography ==
=== EPs ===
- Frank Ely! (2021)
- Homemade Love Songs (2024)

=== Selected singles ===
- "Kay Ganda Mo" (2021)
- "Minamahal" (2021)
- "Ayoko Ng Kiss" (2022)
- "Pahingi Ako Ng Kiss" (2023)
- "Kailangan Mo Ba Ang Puso Ko" (2024)
- "Maisayaw" (2024)
- "Balang Araw" (2024)
- "Namimiss" (2025)
- "Miss Kita" (2025)
- "Pwede Ka Ba?" (2026)
