= Kathy Chism =

American politician

Kathy L. Chism

Member of the Mississippi State Senate from the 3rd district
- Incumbent
- Assumed office January 7, 2020
- Preceded by: Nickey Browning

Personal details
- Born: August 22, 1957 (age 69) Aurora, Illinois, U.S.
- Party: Republican
- Children: 1
- Education: Northeast Mississippi Community College; Itawamba Community College
- Occupation: Realtor, auctioneer, business owner

Kathy L. Chism (born August 22, 1957) is an American politician, serving in the Mississippi State Senate from the 3rd district since 2020.

== Early life and education ==
Born in Aurora, Illinois on August 22, 1957, Chism moved to Mississippi and attended Myrtle High School in Union County. After graduating, she attended Northeast Community College and Itawamba Community College.

== Career ==
Chism works as a realtor, auctioneer, and business owner.

In 2019, she ran for a Mississippi State Senator for the 3rd district, which includes portions of Benton, Ponotoc, and Union counties. She got 50.8% percent of the vote in the Republican primary runoff and 75.3% in the general election; she assumed office on January 7, 2020.

For the 2026 session, she sits on the Enrolled Bills, Ethics, Executive Contingent Fund, Investigative State Offices, Labor, and State Library committees.

== Political positions ==
Chism has advocated for improvements regarding Mississippi's public education system. Prior to taking her seat, she called for a salary increase for public educators, a statewide public pre-K, and more opportunities for career and technical programs.

In 2020, she filed a bill that would require health insurance agencies to help cover health care costs for hearing-impaired children. She filed an amicus brief against medical marijuana to the Mississippi Supreme Court and later voted against a separate senate bill creating a medical marijuana program. She voted against an economic development project located in northern Mississippi that would have developed electric batteries. She voted against early in-person voting legislation.

Chism was one of 14 senators to vote against the bill to change the Mississippi flag, arguing the people of Mississippi should be allowed to vote on the decision.

In early 2025, she was commended for authoring a resolution to save a local meteorologist team. Later that year, she introduced a resolution to call on Mississippi law enforcement agencies to partner with the U.S. Immigration and Customs Enforcement.

== Personal life ==
Chism is married and has one child and four grandchildren. She is a Baptist.
