= Barney Schoby =

American politician (1939–2026)

Barney J. Schoby (January 14, 1939 – June 9, 2026) was an American teacher and politician in Mississippi. He was an Adams County Supervisor from 1974 to 1980 and a member of the Mississippi House of Representatives from 1980 to 1997. He was the first African American to serve on the Adams County Board of Supervisors.

== Life and career ==
Barney Schoby was 32-year-old school teacher in 1971 when he was photographed during his campaign for a state senate seat. Charles Evers was a candidate for governor.

In 1997 he represented District 94 in the Mississippi House of Representatives.

Schoby was a co-plaintiff challenging a redistricting plan he alleged discriminated against black voters.

He was appointed to Mississippi's Workmen's Compensation Commission and reappointed.

Schoby died on June 9, 2026, at the age of 87.
