= Tommy Gollott =

American politician and businessman (born 1935)

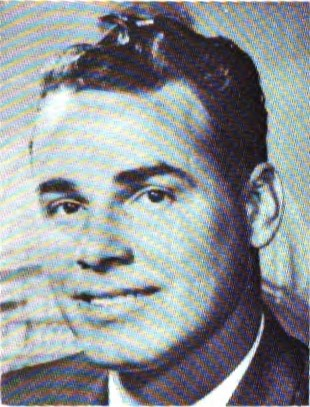
- 1968

President pro tempore of the Mississippi State Senate
- In office January 2, 1996 – January 4, 2000
- Preceded by: Pud Graham
- Succeeded by: Travis Little

Member of the Mississippi State Senate from the 50th district
- In office January 8, 1980 – January 7, 2020
- Preceded by: Sandy Steckler
- Succeeded by: Scott DeLano

Member of the Mississippi House of Representatives
- In office January 2, 1968 – January 8, 1980

Personal details
- Born: Thomas Arlin Gollott; September 29, 1935 (age 91) Biloxi, Mississippi, U.S.
- Party: Republican (2007–present); Democratic (1967–2007)
- Spouse: Zelma Jackson
- Education: University of Southern Mississippi
- Occupation: Businessman, transfer & storage company

Thomas Arlin Gollott (born September 29, 1935) is a businessman and former state legislator in Mississippi. A Democrat, he served as a member of the Mississippi House of Representatives and Mississippi Senate before becoming a Republican in 2007. He represented the 50th District from 1980 to 2020. He had served continuously in the Mississippi Legislature from 1968, when he sat as a state representative, which he served until his election as state senator in 1979. He had been a Democrat until 2007, when he switched his affiliation to Republican. In September 2017, he became the longest-serving member of the Mississippi Legislature in history. He retired from the Senate in 2020, after deciding not to run for another term.

In 1996, Gollott was elected the president pro tempore of the Mississippi State Senate for the 1996-2000 term. He was the first president pro tempore from the Gulf Coast region since Merle F. Palmer in 1968.
