= Eloise Scott =

20th-century Mississippi state representative

Eloise Scott (died October 2, 2013) was an American politician, Mississippi state representative and teacher from Benton County.

== Early life and education ==
Scott was born in Benton County, Mississippi. She went to the Mississippi University for Women for her bachelor's degree and obtained a Masters from the University of Mississippi.

== Career ==
Scott was a public school teacher in Mississippi for over three decades. In 1987 Scott was elected to the Mississippi House of Representatives where she served 4 consecutive terms. In 1999 Scott was appointed as the Chair of the House Ethics Committee.
