= Pud Graham =

Mississippi politician

President pro tempore of the Mississippi State Senate
- In office January 5, 1993 – January 2, 1996
- Preceded by: Ollie Mohamed
- Succeeded by: Tommy Gollott

Member of the Mississippi State Senate from the 3rd district
- In office January 3, 1984 – January 2, 1996
- Preceded by: John H. Waldrop
- Succeeded by: Nickey Browning

Personal details
- Born: October 2, 1936 Pontotoc, Mississippi, U.S.
- Died: December 3, 2011 (aged 75) New Albany, Mississippi, U.S.
- Party: Democratic (until 1994); Republican (1994–2011)
- Spouse: Erma
- Education: Itawamba Community College; Delta State University

Walter A. "Pud" Graham (October 2, 1936 – December 3, 2011) was a state legislator in Mississippi. He served in the Mississippi State Senate, including as president pro tempore from 1993 to 1996. He lived in New Albany, Mississippi.

A Democrat, he eventually became a Republican. Democrat Nickey Browning from Pontotoc succeeded him in the state senate after he chose to run for Agriculture commissioner instead of for re-election.
