= Ray Vecchio =

American politician

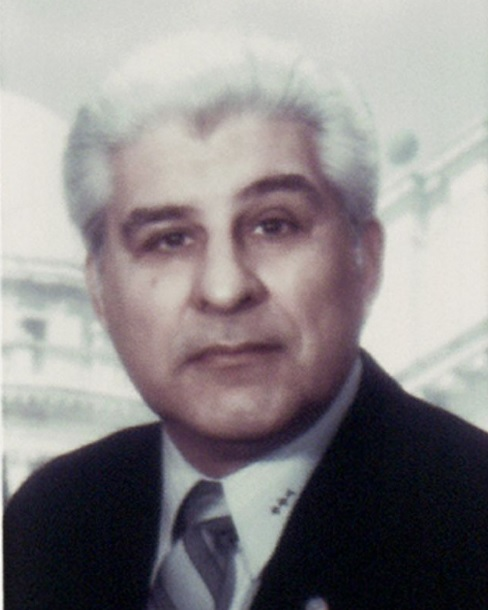
- Official portrait of Vecchio, 1988

Member of the Mississippi House of Representatives from the 112th district
- In office January 8, 1985 – January 5, 1993
- Preceded by: Royce Luke
- Succeeded by: John Read

Personal details
- Born: Raymond Robert Vecchio; February 15, 1933 Rochester, New York
- Died: October 9, 2015 (aged 82) Ocean Springs, Mississippi
- Party: Democratic
- Spouse: Anna Clyde Thames (m. 1952)
- Education: St. John Fisher College; Boston University; Golden Gate University

Military service
- Allegiance: United States
- Branch/service: United States Air Force
- Years of service: 1952–1979
- Rank: Major
- Battles/wars: Korean War

Raymond Robert Vecchio (February 15, 1933 – October 9, 2015) was an American politician who served in the Mississippi House of Representatives from 1985 to 1993. After being narrowly defeated by Gautier mayor John Read in the 1992 Democratic Party primary election for his state house seat, he worked as a field representative in the office of Congressman Gene Taylor.

Mississippi House of Representatives
Preceded by Royce Luke	Member of the Mississippi House of Representatives from the 112th district 1985–1993	Succeeded by John Read
