= Reuben V. Anderson =

American judge (born 1943)

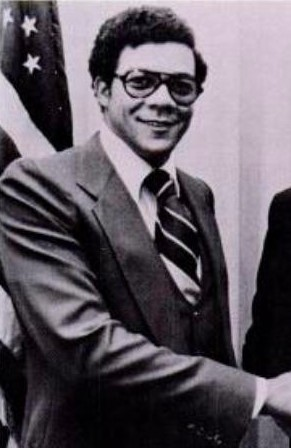
Anderson in 1977

Reuben V. Anderson (born September 16, 1942) is an American attorney who served as a justice of the Supreme Court of Mississippi from 1985 to 1990. He earlier had experience as a justice at the city, county and state level.

For his first decade after law school, Anderson worked as a civil rights attorney in Jackson, Mississippi for the NAACP Legal Defense and Educational Fund.

== Early life ==
Anderson was born in 1943, in Jackson, Mississippi, the state capital. His father was a bricklayer. His great-great-grandparents had been slaves.

After attending segregated public schools, he graduated from Tougaloo College in 1965. It was a historically black college. He attended the state's flagship school, the University of Mississippi, where he earned his law degree in 1967, five years after the university had admitted its first black student, James Meredith, and four years after it admitted its first black law student.

== Career ==
Anderson first worked as a civil rights lawyer, in the firm Anderson, Banks, Nichols & Leventhal, from 1967 to 1977. He was the assistant counsel for the NAACP Legal Defense and Educational Fund in the Mississippi office.

Anderson began his rise in the judiciary when he was elected to the Jackson Municipal Court; he served there for two years. He was subsequently elected as a judge for Hinds County Court, serving for four years, and for three years on the Mississippi 7th Circuit Court of Appeals, which was headquartered in Hinds County.

In 1985 Anderson was appointed by the governor to the State Supreme Court, becoming the first Black judge on that court.

Following Anderson's resignation in 1990, Fred L. Banks Jr. was appointed to serve the remainder of that term. In November 1991, Banks was elected to a full term of his own.

In July 2020, Anderson was appointed to a special commission tasked with presenting a new design for the Flag of Mississippi to voters for their approval. The nine-person commission elected Anderson as its chairman at its first meeting on July 22.

== Family and personal life ==
Anderson's wife is the former Phyllis Wright. They have three children, Roslyn V. Anderson, Vincent R Anderson, and Raina Anderson-Minor.

At the swearing in ceremony of his friend John Horhn as mayor of Jackson, Mississippi on July 1, 2025, it was revealed that colleagues gave Anderson the nickname "Superman."

== See also ==
- List of first minority male lawyers and judges in Mississippi
