= Kevin Blackwell (politician) =

American politician

Member of the Mississippi State Senate from the 19th district
- Incumbent
- Assumed office January 5, 2016
- Preceded by: David Parker

Personal details
- Born: Kevin Edward Blackwell; October 24, 1954 (age 71)
- Party: Republican
- Spouse: Vicki Bryant
- Education: San Diego Mesa College (Associate degree); National University (BBA); Virginia Commonwealth University (MHA)

Kevin Edward Blackwell (born October 24, 1954) is a Republican member of the Mississippi State Senate. Since January 2016, he has represented District 19, including parts of DeSoto and Marshall counties in northern Mississippi.

He resides in Southaven in DeSoto County and formerly lived in Olive Branch, also in DeSoto County, and Little Rock, Arkansas.
