= Leslie D. King =

American judge (born 1949)

Leslie King

Associate Justice of the Supreme Court of Mississippi
- Incumbent
- Assumed office February 23, 2011
- Appointed by: Haley Barbour
- Preceded by: James E. Graves, Jr.

Personal details
- Born: January 17, 1949 (age 76)
- Education: University of Mississippi (BA); Texas Southern University (JD)

Leslie D. King (born January 17, 1949) is an associate justice of the Supreme Court of Mississippi and a former state legislator in Mississippi. He served in the Mississippi House of Representatives from 1980 to 1994.

He was born in Greenville, Mississippi. He graduated from the University of Mississippi and Texas Southern University Law School.

He married Patricia Smith and they have two daughters. He is a member of St. Matthew African Methodist Episcopal Church in Greenville.

== Early life and education ==
King graduated from Coleman High School in Greenville, Mississippi in 1966 and then attended the University of Mississippi.

When King graduated from the University of Mississippi in 1970, he was one of only three African American students in his graduating class. King earned his Juris Doctor from Texas Southern University School of Law in 1973.

King has worked as a lawyer in private practice, as a municipal-court judge, as a public prosecutor and as a public defender. In 1979, King was elected to the Mississippi House of Representatives, serving from 1980 to 1994. In 1994, King was elected to the Mississippi Court of Appeals, where he served until his appointment to the Mississippi Supreme Court in 2011. King is only the 4th African American to serve as a Mississippi Supreme Court Justice in the state's history.

== Judicial service ==
On February 23, 2011, Governor Haley Barbour appointed King to the Supreme Court of Mississippi.

In March 2018, King dissented when the majority found that sentencing a juvenile to life without parole was not contrary to Miller v. Alabama (2012).
