= Merle F. Palmer =

American politician

Merle Franklin Palmer (March 11, 1919 - January 1, 1990) was a state legislator and judge in Mississippi. He served in the Mississippi House of Representatives from 1960 to 1964 and the Mississippi Senate from 1964 to 1970, when he was appointed to the State Circuit Court. He served as president pro tempore of the Mississippi Senate and was acting governor of the state for part of January 1968.

He was a leader during desegregation. He chaired the senate's election committee.
