= Briggs Hopson =

American politician

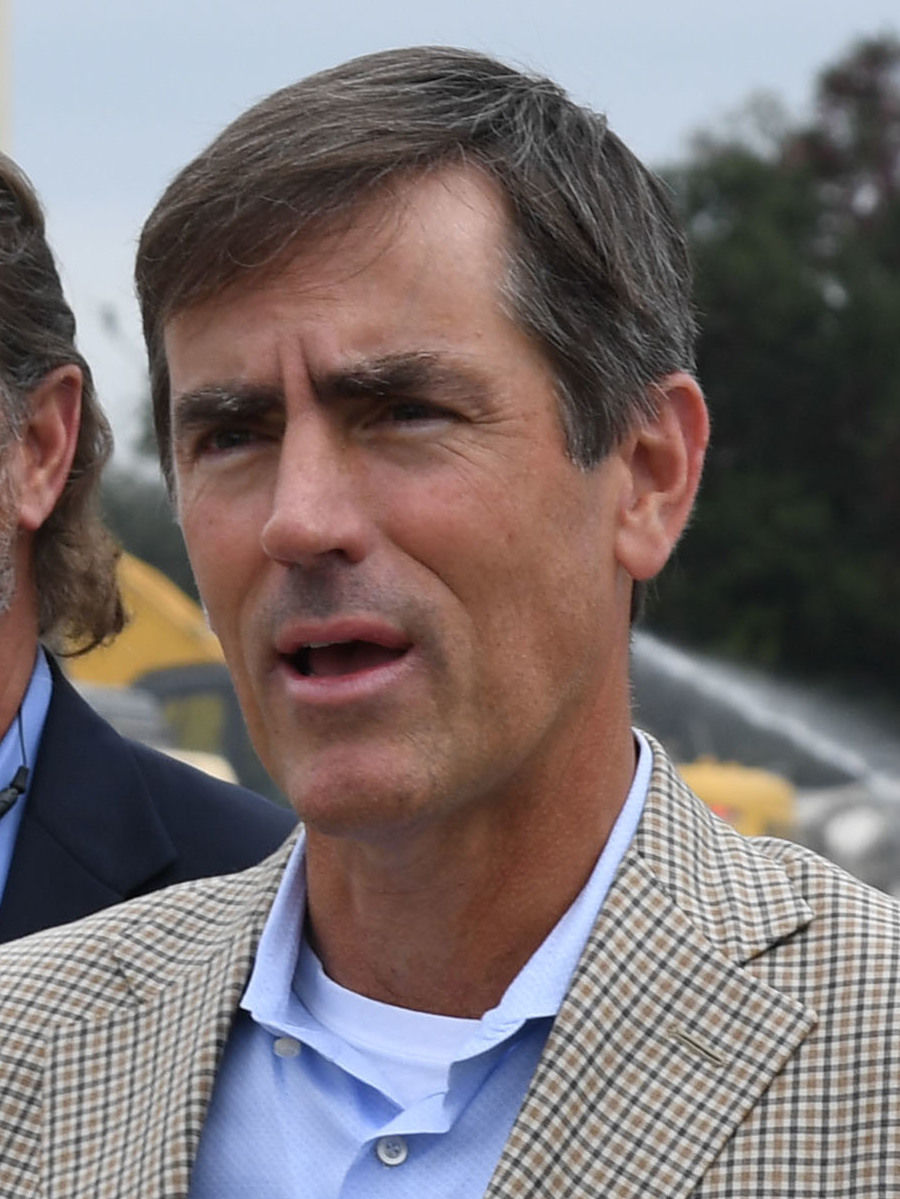
- Hopson at Keesler Air Force Base in 2022

Member of the Mississippi State Senate from the 23rd district
- Incumbent
- Assumed office January 8, 2008
- Preceded by: Mike Chaney

Personal details
- Born: William Briggs Hopson III; October 10, 1965 (age 60) Memphis, Tennessee, U.S.
- Party: Republican
- Spouse: Alison Quaid
- Education: University of Mississippi (BBA), (JD)
- Profession: Attorney

William Briggs Hopson III (born October 10, 1965) is a Republican member of the Mississippi Senate, representing the 23rd District since 2008.
