= Tim Ford (politician) =

American politician (1951–2015)

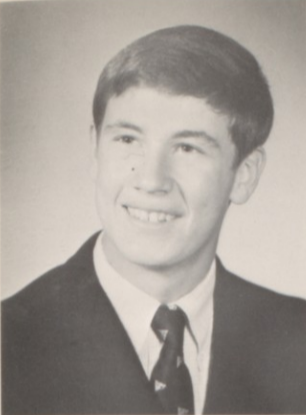
- Tim Ford in a 1969 yearbook photo

59th Speaker of the Mississippi House of Representatives
- In office January 5, 1988 – January 6, 2004
- Preceded by: Buddie Newman
- Succeeded by: William McCoy

Member of the Mississippi House of Representatives from the 18th district
- In office January 8, 1980 – January 6, 2004
- Preceded by: John D. Haynes
- Succeeded by: Jerry Turner

Personal details
- Born: Timothy Alan Ford; October 22, 1951 Winter Haven, Florida, U.S.
- Died: February 27, 2015 (aged 63) Oxford, Mississippi, U.S.
- Party: Democratic
- Spouse: Mary Foose
- Education: University of Mississippi

Timothy Alan Ford (October 22, 1951 – February 27, 2015) was a Mississippi politician. A Democrat, he served in the Mississippi House of Representatives including as Speaker.

Born in Winter Haven, Florida, Ford grew up in Baldwyn, Mississippi. Ford received his bachelor's degree from the University of Mississippi and his law degree from the University of Mississippi School of Law. He practiced law in Jackson, Mississippi. In 1980, he served in the Mississippi House of Representatives from the Tupelo, Mississippi area and was a Democrat. From 1988 until 2004, Ford served as the speaker of the Mississippi House of Representatives. After his retirement, Ford continued to practice law. He died of a heart attack in Oxford, Mississippi.

Political offices
Preceded by Buddie Newman	Speaker of the Mississippi House of Representatives; 1998-2004	Succeeded by William McCoy
