= Alyce Clarke =

American politician

Member of the Mississippi House of Representatives from the 69th district
- In office March 20, 1985 – January 2, 2024
- Preceded by: Fred Banks
- Succeeded by: Tamarra Butler-Washington

Personal details
- Born: July 3, 1939 (age 87) Yazoo City, Mississippi, U.S.
- Party: Democratic

Alyce Griffin Clarke (born July 3, 1939) is an American politician. A Democrat, she is a former member of the Mississippi House of Representatives from the 69th district, being first elected in 1985 and serving until 2024. She was the first black woman elected to the Mississippi Legislature.

== Early life ==
Clarke was born on July 3, 1939, in Yazoo City, Mississippi. She received a bachelor's degree from Alcorn State University and a master's degree from Tuskegee Institute. She also attended Jackson State University and Mississippi College. Prior running for office, Clarke worked in education, teaching home economics. She also worked as a nutritionist at a community health center in Hinds County. She married L.W. Clarke Jr and they had one child, Demarquis Johntrell.

== Political career ==
Clarke was first elected to the Mississippi House of Representatives for the 69th district in 1984. She was the first black woman elected to the Mississippi Legislature. She worked on bringing the federal Women, Infants and Children food program to the state, setting up drug courts and organizing school breakfasts. In the 1990s, she founded a short-lived "biracial, bipartisan" Women's Caucus in the Mississippi House.

She retired at the 2023 Mississippi elections in November.

== Personal life ==
In 1981, she was diagnosed with multiple sclerosis.

== Legacy ==
In 2024, she became the first woman and the first black person to have their portrait on display in the Mississippi State Capitol. Her portrait is an oil painting, and is in the room of the Capitol where the House Education Committee meets.
