= Dean Kirby =

American politician

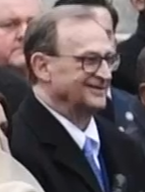

President pro tempore of the Mississippi State Senate
- Incumbent
- Assumed office January 7, 2020
- Preceded by: Gray Tollison

Member of the Mississippi State Senate from the 30th district
- Incumbent
- Assumed office January 7, 1992
- Preceded by: Barbara Blanton

Personal details
- Born: November 21, 1946 (age 79) Lake City, Arkansas, U.S.
- Party: Republican
- Education: Mississippi College (attended); La Salle University (BA)

Murrel Dean Kirby (born November 21, 1946) is an American politician. He serves as a Republican member of the Mississippi State Senate, where he represents District 30 (Rankin County, Mississippi). He has served in the Mississippi senate since 1992. He has served as President pro tempore of the State Senate since 2020.

== Early life ==
Dean Kirby was born November 21, 1946, in Lake City, Arkansas, where his father, who worked as a salesman, was a native. He was moved to Pearl, Mississippi in 1961 and graduated from Pearl High School in 1964. He attended Mississippi College to play basketball but later enrolled in La Salle University, graduating with a bachelor of arts in 1969.

== Career ==
Kirby entered the insurance business as a marketing representative for Aetna in 1972 and then joined an insurance partnership in 1973, the same year he moved to Brandon, Mississippi; he moved back to Pearl three years later. He opened Dean Kirby Insurance Agency in 1979 and ran the agency till his retirement in 2016.

He is a member of the National Conference of State Legislatures, American Legislative Exchange Council, and National Federation of Independent Business (NFIB), among other groups. He is also on the board of directors for the Southern Pine Electric Power Association. He has served on the boards for the Pearl and Rankin County Chambers of Commerce.

=== Politics ===
Before entering the legislature, Kirby was involved in Republican county politics. In 1978, he was chairman of the 36-member Rankin County GOP executive committee, a time where every county office was under Democrat control. He later sought the Republican nomination for Pearl in 1989, where he campaigned on improving water infrastructure and lowering taxes. He won the nomination with 80% of the vote. In the general election, he continued to campaign on taxes and bringing in more businesses. Kirby secured 46% of the vote, narrowly losing to the Democrat candidate.

In late February 1991, Kirby announced his candidacy for District 30 in the Mississippi State Senate, which is located entirely in Rankin County. He faced incumbent Republican Senator Barbara Blanton, who he narrowly defeated in the Republican primary with 51% of the vote. Some journalists considered Kirby's stance on allowing Mississippians to vote on a lottery, as compared to the senate deciding, was the deciding factor in the race. He spent $6000 in the primary while Blanton spent $26,000. He easily won the general election against a Democrat and Independent candidate. He has served continuously since 1992.

He was elected President pro tempore of the State Senate in 2020 and was reelected to the position in 2024. In this position, Kirby helps run day-to-day operations of the chamber, presides in the absence of the lieutenant governor, and serves as the chair of the Rules Committee.

== Personal life ==
He is married and is of Baptist faith. He has 3 children and 6 grandchildren.

Kirby is a 32nd Degree Scottish Rite Mason.

Mississippi State Senate
Preceded by Gray Tollison	President pro tempore of the Mississippi Senate; 2020–present	Incumbent
