= Hillman Terome Frazier =

American politician (born 1950)

Hillman T. Frazier
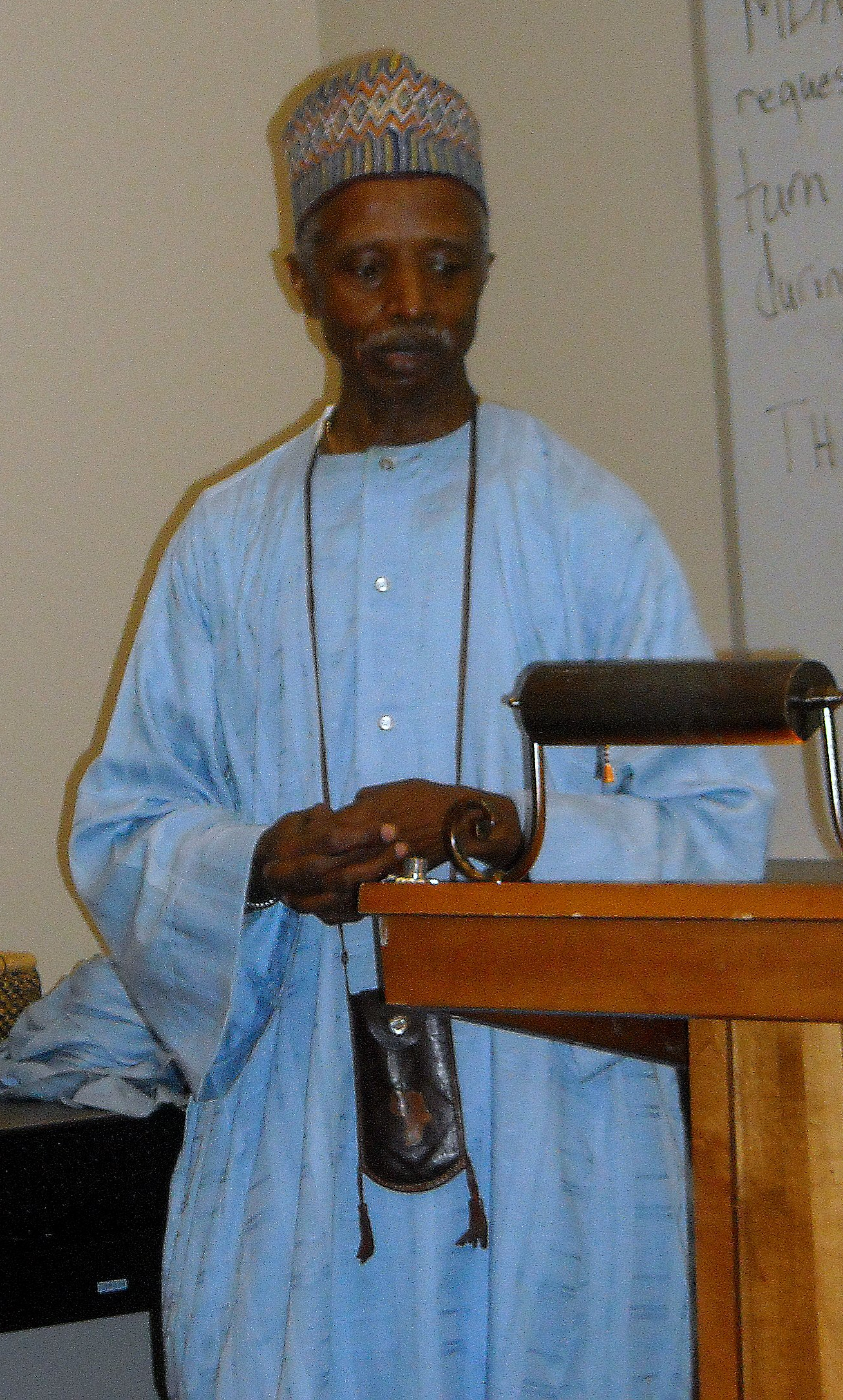
- Frazier in 2009

Member of the Mississippi State Senate from the 27th district
- Incumbent
- Assumed office December 8, 1993
- Preceded by: Doug Anderson

Member of the Mississippi House of Representatives
- In office January 8, 1980 – December 8, 1993
- Preceded by: Doug Anderson
- Succeeded by: Mary Coleman
- Constituency: 67th district (1980–1993); 65th district (1993–1994)

Personal details
- Born: July 17, 1950 (age 76) Hinds County, Mississippi, U.S.
- Party: Democratic
- Education: Jackson State University (BA); George Washington University (JD)

Hillman Terome Frazier (born July 17, 1950) is a Democratic member of the Mississippi Senate, representing the 27th District since 1993. From 1980 to 1993, he served in the Mississippi House of Representatives. During his time in the legislature, he authored legislation to make Martin Luther King Jr.'s birthday a state holiday and to formally adopt the 13th amendment.

Born in Jackson, Frazier graduated from Jackson State University and George Washington University Law School. After school, he worked in the Mississippi House as a legal counsel and bill drafter, as well as a staffer for former Speaker Buddie Newman. At the same time, he engaged in campaign activities for William F. Winter's 1975 campaign for governor and Jimmy Carter's 1976 presidential campaign.

A Protestant, Frazier is married with two kids and works as a consultant during his time in addition to his legislative duties.

== Early life and education ==
Frazier was born in Jackson, Mississippi, on July 17, 1950. His mother was a homemaker, and his father was a carpenter and Baptist minister. He attended Holy Ghost Catholic School for secondary education.

He graduated from Jackson State University with a degree in political science in 1971 and from George Washington University Law School in 1974; he applied to the Mississippi Bar that same year, twice in 1975, and again in 1978. Frazier has participated in educational programs at the University of Virginia, the University of North Carolina at Chapel Hill, and the John F. Kennedy School of Government. He is a 1998 Eisenhower Fellow, where he studied in Central Europe.

== Career ==
After law school, he worked as a legislative staffer for former Speaker Buddie Newman. He also drafted bills and served as legal counsel in the Mississippi House of Representatives; worked in a legal services office in Jackson; and was an adjunct professor of political science at Jackson State University.

He was appointed the assistant campaign coordinator for William F. Winter's 1975 campaign for governor. He was a member of the Hinds County Steering Committee for Jimmy Carter's 1976 presidential campaign.

=== Mississippi Legislature ===
In June 1979, he announced his candidacy for the District 67 seat in the Mississippi House. He was elected in 1980 and served until 1993.

He ran in the special election for the District 27 seat in the Mississippi State Senate following incumbent Senator Doug Anderson's election as Hinds County supervisor. He was elected unopposed in December 1993 and has been re-elected continuously. He chairs the Interstate and Federal Cooperation committee and is a member of several other committees.

During his time in the legislature, he authored legislation to make Martin Luther King Jr.'s birthday a state holiday and to formally adopt the 13th amendment; he alerted other legislators that the amendment had not yet been adopted.

== Personal life ==
A Protestant, Frazier is married with two kids. He works as a consultant. He is a Prince Hall Mason and is affiliated with the NAACP and the National Urban League.

A car enthusiast, he graduated from Hinds Community College in 2012 with a degree in automobile collision repair technology.
