= Horace Lawson Buckley =

American politician (born 1941)

Horace Lawson Buckley (born in 1941) is a former teacher, pastor, track coach, and state legislator in Mississippi. He was born in Jackson, Mississippi He was elected to the Mississippi legislature in 1974. He served 16 years in the Mississippi House of Representatives.

He was born in Jackson, Mississippi and received a B.S. degree from Mississippi Valley State University. He continued his studies at Tuskegee Institute, Jackson State University, and Mississippi State University. He was elected from the 70th district in 1974 to the state legislature. He was involved with the Mississippi Teachers Association, Mississippi Personnel and Guidance Association Board, Jackson Housing Authority and the General Baptist State Convention.

He graduated from Lanier High School. He taught at Coleman High School in Greenville, Mississippi. He has been a coach, counselor, and assistant principal. He became a pastor of Cade Chapel Missionary Baptist Church in 1969.

He married Myra Beamon and they had four children.
