= Mississippi State Senate =

Upper house of the Mississippi Legislature

Coordinates: 32°18′14″N 90°10′56″W

- Mississippi Legislature

Type
- Type: Upper house
- Term limits: None

History
- New session started: January 2, 2024

Leadership
- President: Delbert Hosemann (R) since January 14, 2020
- President pro tempore: Dean Kirby (R) since January 7, 2020
- Minority Leader: Derrick Simmons (D) since July 31, 2017

Structure
- Seats: 52
- Political groups: Majority: Republican (34); Minority: Democratic (17); Vacancies: Vacant (1)
- Length of term: 4 years
- Authority: Article IV, Mississippi Constitution
- Salary: $10,000/year + per diem

Elections
- Last election: November 7, 2023 (52 seats)
- Next election: November 2, 2027 (52 seats)
- Redistricting: Legislative Control

Meeting place
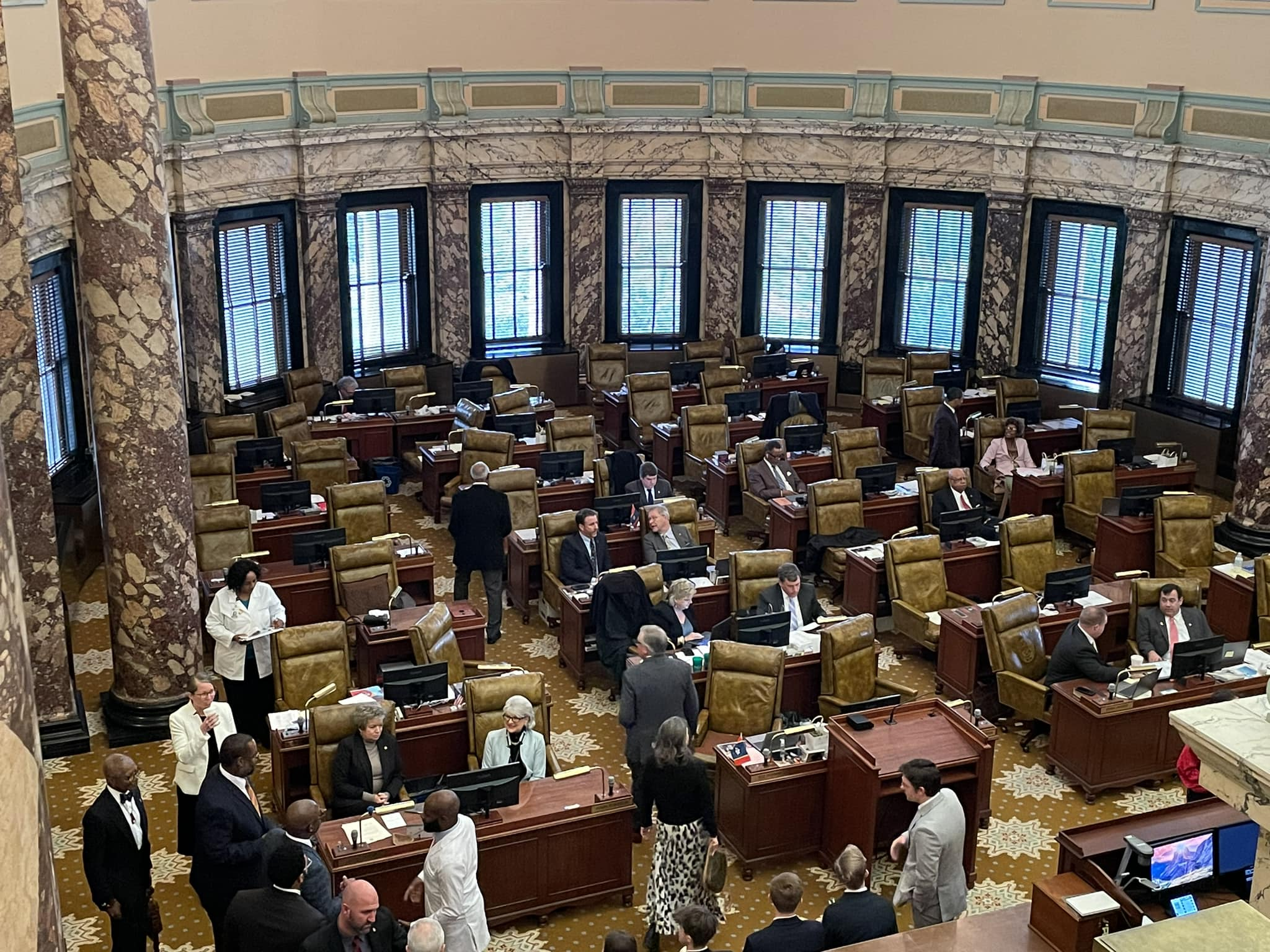
- State Senate Chamber; Mississippi State Capitol; Jackson, Mississippi

Website
- Mississippi State Senate

Rules
- Senate Rules

The Mississippi State Senate is the upper house of the Mississippi Legislature, the state legislature of the U.S. state of Mississippi. The Senate, along with the lower Mississippi House of Representatives, convenes at the Mississippi State Capitol in Jackson. The Lieutenant Governor of Mississippi serves as President of the Senate.

The Senate is composed of 52 senators representing an equal number of constituent districts, with 56,947 people per district (2020 census). In the current legislative session, the Republican Party holds 34 seats while the Democratic Party holds 18 seats, creating a Republican trifecta in the state government.

The Senate can confirm or reject gubernatorial appointments to the state cabinet, commissions, and boards and can create and amend bills.

== Membership, terms and elections ==
According to the current Mississippi Constitution, the Senate is to be composed of no more than 52 members elected for four-year terms with no term limits. Districts are reapportioned to reflect population changes, and per the 2020 census, each district has about 56,947 people. To qualify for election, candidates must be at least 25 years old, a qualified elector of the state for the past four years, and be a resident of the district or county they are running to represent for the past two years. All candidates must pay either a $250 fee to their state party executive committee or to the Mississippi Secretary of State if they are running as an independent. Independent candidates must collect 50 signatures to run. Elections to the Senate are held on the first Tuesday after the first Monday in November during the state general elections.

If a vacancy occurs in the Senate before June 1, the governor must order an election within 30 days after the vacancy and give a 40-day notice to the appropriate counties where the seat is located. No special election occurs if the vacancy happens after June 1.

== Powers and process ==
The state legislature is constitutionally-mandated to meet for 125 days every four years at the start of a new term and 90 days in other years. The Senate reconvenes on a yearly basis on the Tuesday after the first Monday in January. While the Mississippi House of Representatives can extend its sessions, the Senate cannot.

The Senate has the authority to determine rules of its own proceedings, punish its members for disorderly behavior, and expel a member with a two-thirds vote of its membership. A majority in the Senate establishes a quorum, though less members can adjourn, though not for more than 3 days without the House's consent. Bills can originate in the Senate and must undergo three readings in each house, unless two-thirds of the house dispenses with the rules. Amendments to bills must be approved by both houses. The Senate, in conjunction with the Mississippi House of Representatives, draws and approves both congressional and district boundaries. The congressional boundaries can be vetoed by the governor, while the district boundaries, created by a joint resolution between both houses, cannot be vetoed by the governor.

The governor has the power to veto legislation, but legislators can override the veto with a two-thirds decision. The Senate tries all impeachments referred to it by the House of Representatives. All gubernatorial appointments are subject to approval of the Senate.

== Leadership ==
The president of the Senate is Mississippi Lieutenant Governor Delbert Hosemann, who is Republican. The president pro tempore is Republican Dean Kirby. The minority leader is Democrat Derrick Simmons.

The lieutenant governor serves as the president of the Senate and has the sole ability to appoint the chairmanships or vice chairmanships of various Senate committees, regardless of party size. They can only cast a legislative vote if required to break a tie. In the absence of the lieutenant governor, the president pro tempore presides over the Senate. The president pro tempore is elected by a majority of senators present, with following elections for the senate secretary, seargent-at-arms, and a doorkeeper. The President Pro Tempore chairs the Senate Rules Committee, oversees the day-to-day operations of the Senate staff, and assumes the responsibilities of the president in their absence.

== Party composition ==
Affiliation	Party (Shading indicates majority caucus)		Total	Vacant
Affiliation	Democratic	Republican	Total	Vacant
End of previous legislature (2023)	16	36	52	0
Start of current legislature (2024)	16	36	52	0
January 6, 2025	16	35	51	1
April 16, 2025	16	36	52	0
June 30, 2025	14	36	50	2
January 6, 2026	18	34	52	0
August 31, 2026	17	34	51	1
Latest voting share	33.3%	66.7%		

=== History ===
Composition of the Mississippi State Senate (November 2026): Republican senator Democratic senator Vacant

Following the 2003 general elections, the Democratic Party retained their majority in the Senate until a party switch by Democratic Senator James "Shannon" Walley of Leakesville in January 2007 placed the chamber's party composition at 26 Republicans to 26 Democrats. However, because Lieutenant Governor Amy Tuck was a Republican, this gave Republicans control of the Senate for the first time since Reconstruction and a de facto majority. In the 2007 general elections, Democrats won back control of the chamber; however party switches from Senators Nolan Mettetal in February 2008 and Cindy Hyde-Smith in December 2010 once again gave the Republicans a de facto majority, with Lieutenant Governor Phil Bryant holding the tiebreaker vote. After another party switch in February 2011 from Ezell Lee, the Republicans expanded their majority to 27–24, with one vacancy.

Republicans continued to expand this majority with the 2011 general elections, where they pushed their majority to 30–22; however a party switch from Gray Tollison in November 2011 and Nickey Browning in March 2013 further expanded this to a 32–20 majority. This gave Republicans a supermajority for tax bills and bond issuances. Republicans sought to continue to grow their majority in the 2015 general elections, and while initial assessments assumed they had expanded it, the margin remained the same. In late 2017, they picked up a seat following Bill Stone's retirement, increasing their majority to 33–19. Four years later, Republicans picked up three seats in the 2019 general elections, creating a 36–16 veto-proof supermajority.

Republicans maintained their 36–16 supermajority in the 2023 general elections. However, the map used in the 2023 elections was later overturned by a federal court because it violated Voting Rights Act by trying to dilute Black representation. As a result, a new map was eventually drawn, and special elections were ordered for November 2025. Democrats picked up two seats in the 2025 special elections and broke the Republican supermajority for the first time since 2019.

As of 2026, the Mississippi Senate has 34 Republican members and 18 Democratic members.

== Members of the Mississippi Senate (2024–2028) ==
District	Name	Party	Start	Counties
1	Michael McLendon	Rep	2020	DeSoto, Tate
2	Theresa Gillespie Isom	Dem	2026	DeSoto, Tunica
3	Kathy Chism	Rep	2020	Benton, Marshall, Pontotoc, Prentiss, Union
4	Rita Potts Parks	Rep	2012	Alcorn, Tippah
5	Daniel Sparks	Rep	2020	Itawamba, Prentiss, Tishomingo
6	Chad McMahan	Rep	2016	Lee
7	Hob Bryan	Dem	1984	Itawamba, Lee, Monroe
8	Benjamin Suber	Rep	2020	Calhoun, Chickasaw, Lafayette, Pontotoc, Yalobusha
9	Nicole Akins Boyd	Rep	2020	Lafayette, Panola
10	Neil Whaley	Rep	2018	Lafayette, Marshall, Tate, Union
11	Reginald Jackson	Dem	2024	Coahoma, DeSoto, Quitman, Tate, Tunica
12	Derrick Simmons	Dem	2011	Bolivar, Coahoma, Washington
13	Sarita Simmons	Dem	2020	Bolivar, Sunflower, Tallahatchie
14	Lydia Chassaniol	Rep	2007	Attala, Carroll, Grenada, Leflore, Montgomery
15	Bart Williams	Rep	2020	Choctaw, Montgomery, Oktibbeha, Webster
16	Angela Turner-Ford	Dem	2013	Clay, Lowndes, Noxubee, Oktibbeha
17	Charles Younger	Rep	2014	Lowndes, Monroe, Oktibbeha
18	Lane Taylor	Rep	2025	Leake, Neshoba, Winston
19	Kevin Blackwell	Rep	2016	DeSoto
20	Josh Harkins	Rep	2012	Rankin
21	Bradford Blackmon	Dem	2024	Attala, Holmes, Leake, Madison
22	Joseph C. Thomas (Note: Thomas previously served in the state senate from 2004–2008.)	Dem	2020	Humphreys, Madison, Sharkey, Yazoo
23	Briggs Hopson	Rep	2008	Issaquena, Madison, Warren, Yazoo
24	Justin Pope	Dem	2026	Leflore, Panola, Tallahatchie
25	J. Walter Michel (Note: Michel previously served in the state senate from 1999–2011.)	Rep	2016	Hinds, Madison
26	Kamesha Mumford	Dem	2026	Hinds, Madison
27	Hillman Terome Frazier	Dem	1993	Hinds
28	Sollie Norwood	Dem	2013	Hinds
29	David Blount	Dem	2008	Hinds
30	Dean Kirby	Rep	1992	Rankin
31	Tyler McCaughn	Rep	2020	Lauderdale, Newton, Rankin, Scott
32	Rod Hickman	Dem	2021	Kemper, Lauderdale, Noxubee, Winston
33	Jeff Tate	Rep	2020	Clarke, Lauderdale
34	Vacant		2026	Covington, Jasper, Jones
35	Andy Berry	Rep	2024	Copiah, Jefferson Davis, Lawrence, Simpson
36	Brian Rhodes	Rep	2024	Rankin, Smith
37	Albert Butler (Note: Butler represented in the 36th district from 2010–2024.)	Dem	2010	Adams, Claiborne, Copiah, Franklin, Hinds, Jefferson
38	Gary Brumfield	Dem	2024	Adams, Amite, Pike, Walthall, Wilkinson
39	Jason Barrett	Rep	2020	Amite, Franklin, Lawrence, Lincoln, Pike
40	Angela Burks Hill	Rep	2012	Pearl River, Stone
41	Joey Fillingane	Rep	2007	Covington, Lamar, Marion, Walthall
42	Don Hartness	Rep	2026	Forrest, Jones
43	Dennis DeBar	Rep	2016	George, Greene, Wayne
44	Chris Johnson	Rep	2020	Forrest, Lamar, Perry
45	Johnny DuPree	Dem	2026	Forrest
46	Philman Ladner	Rep	2024	Hancock, Harrison
47	Mike Seymour	Rep	2016	Harrison, Jackson, Stone
48	Mike Thompson	Rep	2020	Hancock, Harrison
49	Joel Carter	Rep	2018	Harrison
50	Scott DeLano	Rep	2020	Harrison
51	Jeremy England	Rep	2020	Jackson
52	Brice Wiggins	Rep	2012	Jackson

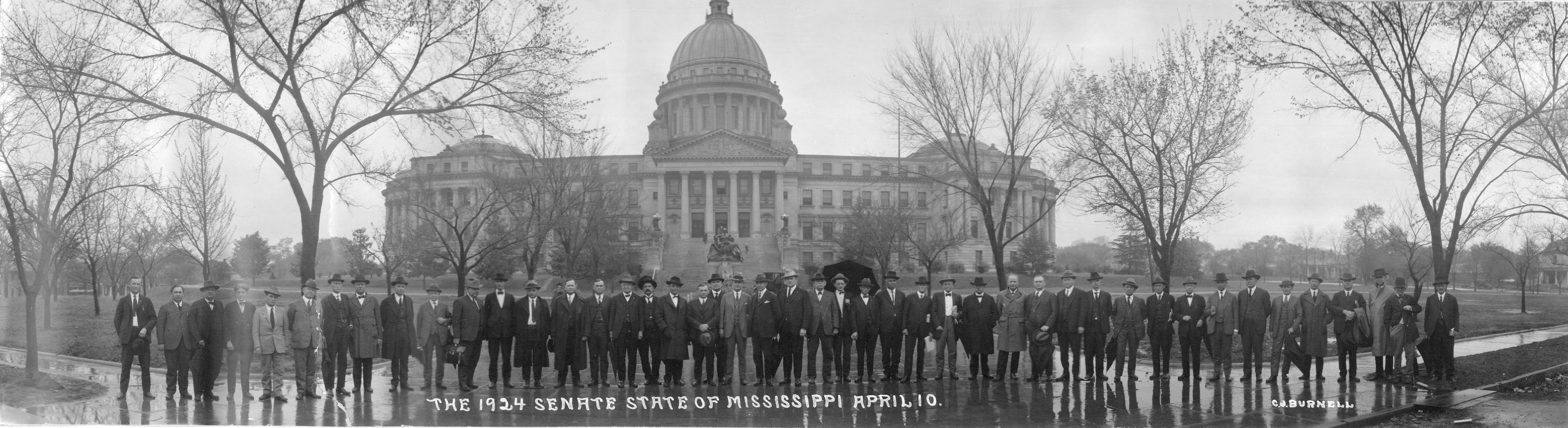

== List of presidents pro tempore ==
Since 1833 the Senate has had 55 Presidents pro tempore:

	Name	County/District	Term of service
1	Charles Lynch		1833–1834
2	Parmenas Briscoe	Claiborne	1834–1836
3	William Van Norman	Amite	1836–1837
4	Alexander McNutt		1837–1838
5	Adam Lewis Bingaman		1838–1840
6	George Baldwin Augustus	Noxubee	1840–1842
7	Jesse Speight		1842–1843
8	George T. Swann		1846–1848
9	Dabney Lipscomb	Lowndes	1848–1851
10	James Whitfield		1851–1854
11	John J. Pettus		1854–1858
12	James Drane		1858–1865
13	John M. Simonton		1865–1869
14	William M. Hancock	9th	1870–1872
15	Joseph Bennett	11th	1872–1874
16	Finis H. Little	22nd	1874–1875
17	John Marshall Stone		1875–1876
18	William H. Sims	Lowndes, Oktibbeha, Clay	1876–1878
19	Reuben O. Reynolds	Monroe, Chickasaw	1878–1888
20	J. P. Walker	20th (Lauderdale)	1888–1890
21	Robert Aaron Dean	7th	1890–1896
22	James T. Harrison	25th	1896–1900
23	John R. Dinsmore	16th	1900
24	William Gwin Kiger	12th	1902–1904
25	E. H. Moore	30th	1904–1908
26	John L. Hebron Jr.	29th	1908–1912
27	Albert C. Anderson	36th	1912–1916
28	Carroll Kendrick	37th	1916–1920
29	John Fatheree	3rd	1920–1922
30	Fred B. Smith	36th	1922–1924
31	Mark Perrin Lowrey Love	42nd	1924–1928
32	Homer Casteel	18th	1928–1932
33	W. C. Adams	37th	1932–1936
34	John Culkin	12th	1936–1940
35	W. B. Roberts	30th	1940
36	Oscar O. Wolfe Jr.	30th	1941–1952
37	James Orville Clark	37th	1952–1956
38	Earl Evans Jr.	18th	1956–1960
39	George Yarbrough		1960–1968
40	Merle F. Palmer		1968–1971
41	Marion Smith	30th	1971–1972
42	B. G. Perry		1972–1976
43	William B. Alexander	12th	1976–1984
44	Thomas Norman Brooks		1984–1985
45	Glen Deweese	33rd	1986–1992
46	Ollie Mohamed	21st	1992–1994
47	Pud Graham		1994–1996
48	Tommy Gollott	50th	1996–2000
49	Travis Little		2000–2008
50	Billy Hewes		2008–2012
51	Terry W. Brown		2012–2015
52	Giles Ward	18th	2015–2016
53	Terry C. Burton	31st	2016–2019
54	Gray Tollison	9th	2019–2020
55	Dean Kirby	30th	2020–Present

== See also ==
- Mississippi State Capitol
- Mississippi Legislature
- Mississippi House of Representatives
- List of former members of the Mississippi State Senate
- List of Mississippi state legislatures
