= 2024–2028 Mississippi Legislature =

←	2020–2024 Mississippi Legislature
- State Seal

Overview
- Legislative body: Mississippi Legislature
- Jurisdiction: Mississippi, United States
- Meeting place: Mississippi State Capitol
- Term: 2 January 2024 –
- Election: 2023 Mississippi elections

Mississippi State Senate
- Republican (34) Democratic (18)
- Members: 52
- President: Delbert Hosemann
- President pro tempore: Dean Kirby
- Party control: Republican

Mississippi House of Representatives
- Republican (80); Democratic (40); Independent (2)
- Members: 122
- Speaker: Jason White
- Party control: Republican

The 2024–2028 Mississippi Legislature first met in January 2024. It is composed of the Mississippi State Senate and the Mississippi House of Representatives.

== Senate ==
=== Leadership ===
The president of the Senate is Mississippi lieutenant governor Delbert Hosemann, who is Republican. The president pro tempore is Republican Dean Kirby. The minority leader is Democrat Derrick Simmons.

=== Party composition ===
Affiliation	Party (Shading indicates majority caucus)		Total	
Affiliation	Democratic	Republican	Total	Vacant
End of previous legislature (2023)	16	36	52	0
Start of current legislature (2024)	16	36	52	0
January 6, 2025	16	35	51	1
April 16, 2025	16	36	52	0
June 30, 2025	14	36	50	2
January 6, 2026	18	34	52	0
Latest voting share	34.6%	65.4%		

As of January 2026, the Mississippi State Senate has 34 Republican members and 18 Democratic members.

=== Members ===
District	Name	Party	Assumed office	Counties represented	Notes
1	Michael McLendon	Rep	2020	DeSoto	
2	Theresa Gillespie Isom	Dem	2026	DeSoto	
3	Kathy Chism	Rep	2020	Benton, Marshall, Pontotoc, Prentiss, Union	
4	Rita Potts Parks	Rep	2012	Alcorn, Tippah	
5	Daniel Sparks	Rep	2020	Itawamba, Prentiss, Tishomingo	
6	Chad McMahan	Rep	2016	Lee	
7	Hob Bryan	Dem	1984	Itawamba, Lee, Monroe	
8	Benjamin Suber	Rep	2020	Calhoun, Chickasaw, Lafayette, Pontotoc, Yalobusha	
9	Nicole Akins Boyd	Rep	2020	Lafayette, Panola	
10	Neil Whaley	Rep	2018	Lafayette, Marshall, Tate, Union	
11	Reginald Jackson	Dem	2024	Coahoma, DeSoto, Quitman, Tate, Tunica	
12	Derrick Simmons	Dem	2011	Bolivar, Coahoma, Washington	
13	Sarita Simmons	Dem	2020	Bolivar, Sunflower, Tallahatchie	
14	Lydia Chassaniol	Rep	2007	Attala, Carroll, Grenada, Leflore, Montgomery	
15	Bart Williams	Rep	2020	Choctaw, Montgomery, Oktibbeha, Webster	
16	Angela Turner-Ford	Dem	2013	Clay, Lowndes, Noxubee, Oktibbeha	
17	Charles Younger	Rep	2014	Lowndes, Monroe, Oktibbeha	
18	Lane Taylor	Rep	2025	Leake, Neshoba, Winston	
19	Kevin Blackwell	Rep	2016	DeSoto	
20	Josh Harkins	Rep	2012	Rankin	
21	Bradford Blackmon	Dem	2024	Attala, Holmes, Leake, Madison	
22	Joseph C. Thomas	Dem	2020	Humphreys, Madison, Sharkey, Yazoo	Previously served from 2004–2008
23	Briggs Hopson	Rep	2008	Issaquena, Madison, Warren, Yazoo	
24	Justin Pope	Dem	2026	Leflore, Panola, Tallahatchie	
25	J. Walter Michel	Rep	2016	Hinds, Madison	Previously served from 1999–2011
26	Kamesha Mumford	Dem	2026	Hinds, Madison	
27	Hillman Terome Frazier	Dem	1993	Hinds	
28	Sollie Norwood	Dem	2013	Hinds	
29	David Blount	Dem	2008	Hinds	
30	Dean Kirby	Rep	1992	Rankin	
31	Tyler McCaughn	Rep	2020	Lauderdale, Newton, Rankin, Scott	
32	Rod Hickman	Dem	2021	Kemper, Lauderdale, Noxubee, Winston	
33	Jeff Tate	Rep	2020	Clarke, Lauderdale	
34	Vacant		2026	Forrest, Jasper, Jones	
35	Andy Berry	Rep	2024	Copiah, Jefferson Davis, Lawrence, Simpson	
36	Brian Rhodes	Rep	2024	Rankin, Smith	
37	Albert Butler	Dem	2010	Adams, Claiborne, Copiah, Franklin, Hinds, Jefferson	Represented district 36 prior to 2024
38	Gary Brumfield	Dem	2024	Adams, Amite, Pike, Walthall, Wilkinson	
39	Jason Barrett	Rep	2020	Amite, Franklin, Lawrence, Lincoln, Pike	
40	Angela Burks Hill	Rep	2012	Pearl River, Stone	
41	Joey Fillingane	Rep	2007	Covington, Lamar, Marion, Walthall	
42	Don Hartness	Rep	2026	Forrest, Greene, Jones, Wayne	
43	Dennis DeBar	Rep	2016	George, Greene, Wayne	
44	Chris Johnson	Rep	2026	Lamar	
45	Johnny DuPree	Dem	2026	Forrest, Perry	
46	Philman Ladner	Rep	2024	Hancock, Harrison	
47	Mike Seymour	Rep	2016	Harrison, Jackson, Stone	
48	Mike Thompson	Rep	2020	Hancock, Harrison	
49	Joel Carter	Rep	2018	Harrison	
50	Scott DeLano	Rep	2020	Harrison	
51	Jeremy England	Rep	2020	Jackson	
52	Brice Wiggins	Rep	2012	Jackson	

== House ==
=== Leadership ===
The Speaker of the House is Jason White, and the Speaker pro tempore is Manly Barton. The minority leader is Robert Johnson III.

=== Party composition ===
The following composition reflects the balance of power after the 2023 elections. Republicans secured a majority for the fourth time since 2011, the first year when Republicans won the majority of seats in the State House since 1870. The 2023 elections were marked by new leadership, as the past speaker Phillip Gunn retired, allowing his chief lieutenant, then-Speaker Pro Tempore Jason White to become the new speaker. The 2023 elections saw the seating of 25 new members.

Affiliation	Party (Shading indicates majority caucus)			Total	
Affiliation	Democratic	Republican	Independent	Total	Vacant
End of previous legislature (2023)	40	76	3	119	3
Start of current legislature (2024)	41	79	2	122	0
Latest voting share	33.6%	64.8%	1.6%		

=== Members ===
District	Representative	Party	Assumed office	Residence	Notes
1	Lester Carpenter	Republican	2008	Burnsville	
2	Brad Mattox	Republican	2024	Corinth	
3	William Tracy Arnold	Republican	2012	Booneville	
4	Jody Steverson	Republican	2012	Ripley	
5	John Faulkner	Democratic	2014	Holly Springs	
6	Justin Keen	Republican	2024	Byhalia	
7	Kimberly Remak	Republican	2024	Olive Branch	
8	Trey Lamar	Republican	2012	Senatobia	
9	Cedric Burnett	Democratic	2016	Tunica	
10	Josh Hawkins	Republican	2024	Batesville	
11	Lataisha Jackson	Democratic	2013	Como	
12	Clay Deweese	Republican	2020	Oxford	
13	Steve Massengill	Republican	2012	Hickory Flat	
14	Sam Creekmore IV	Republican	2020	New Albany	
15	Beth Luther Waldo	Republican	2024	Pontotoc	
16	Rickey W. Thompson	Democratic	2020	Shannon	
17	Shane Aguirre	Republican	2016	Tupelo	
18	Jerry Turner	Republican	2004	Baldwyn	
19	Randy Boyd	Republican	2012	Mantachie	
20	Rodney Hall	Republican	2024	Southaven	
21	Donnie Bell	Republican	2008	Fulton	
22	Jon Ray Lancaster	Republican	2020	Houston	
23	Andrew Stepp	Republican	2024	Bruce	Died December 5, 2024
23	Perry Van Bailey	Republican	2025	Calhoun City	
24	Jeff Hale	Republican	2016	Nesbit	
25	Dan Eubanks	Republican	2016	Walls	
26	Orlando Paden	Democratic	2016	Clarksdale	Resigned June 30, 2025
27	Kenji Holloway	Democratic	2024	Carthage	
28	Doc Harris	Republican	2024	Hernando	
29	Robert L. Sanders	Democratic	2021	Cleveland	
30	Tracey Rosebud	Democratic	2018	Tutwiler	
31	Otis Anthony	Democratic	2019	Indianola	
32	Solomon Osborne	Democratic	2019	Greenwood	
33	Jim Estrada	Republican	2024	Saucier	
34	Kevin Horan	Republican	2012	Grenada	
35	Joey Hood	Republican	2012	Ackerman	
36	Karl Gibbs	Democratic	2013	West Point	
37	Andy Boyd	Republican	2023	Columbus	
38	Cheikh Taylor	Democratic	2018	Starkville	
39	Dana McLean	Republican	2020	Columbus	
40	Hester Jackson-McCray	Democratic	2020	Horn Lake	
41	Kabir Karriem	Democratic	2016	Columbus	
42	Carl Mickens	Democratic	2016	Brooksville	
43	Rob Roberson	Republican	2016	Starkville	
44	C. Scott Bounds	Republican	2004	Philadelphia	
45	Keith Jackson	Democratic	2024	Preston	
46	Karl Oliver	Republican	2016	Winona	
47	Bryant Clark	Democratic	2004	Pickens	
48	Jason White	Republican	2012	West	Speaker of the House
49	Willie Bailey	Democratic	1995	Greenville	
50	John Hines	Democratic	2001	Greenville	
51	Timaka James-Jones	Democratic	2024	Belzoni	
52	Bill Kinkade	Republican	2013	Byhalia	
53	Vince Mangold	Republican	2016	Brookhaven	
54	Kevin Ford	Republican	2018	Vicksburg	
55	Oscar Denton	Democratic	2014	Vicksburg	
56	Clay Mansell	Republican	2024	Clinton	
57	Lawrence Blackmon	Democratic	2024	Canton	
58	Jonathan McMillan	Republican	2024	Madison	
59	Brent Powell	Republican	2013	Brandon	
60	Fred Shanks	Republican	2018	Brandon	
61	Gene Newman	Republican	2020	Pearl	
62	Lance Varner	Republican	2024	Florence	
63	Stephanie Foster	Democratic	2020	Jackson	
64	Shanda Yates	Independent	2020	Jackson	
65	Chris Bell	Democratic	2016	Jackson	
66	Fabian Nelson	Democratic	2024	Byram	
67	Earle S. Banks	Democratic	1993	Jackson	
68	Zakiya Summers	Democratic	2020	Jackson	
69	Tamarra Butler-Washington	Democratic	2024	Jackson	
70	Bo Brown	Democratic	2020	Jackson	
71	Ronnie Crudup Jr.	Democratic	2019	Jackson	
72	Justis Gibbs	Democratic	2024	Jackson	
73	Jill Ford	Republican	2020	Madison	
74	Lee Yancey	Republican	2020	Brandon	
75	Celeste Hurst	Republican	2024	Sandhill	
76	Gregory Holloway Sr.	Democratic	2000	Hazlehurst	
77	Price Wallace	Republican	2018	Mendenhall	
78	Randy Rushing	Republican	2012	Decatur	
79	Mark Tullos	Republican	2016	Raleigh	
80	Omeria Scott	Democratic	1993	Laurel	
81	Stephen Horne	Republican	2004	Meridian	
82	Charles Young Jr.	Democratic	2012	Meridian	Died December 19, 2025
82	Gregory Elliott	Republican	2025	Meridian	
83	Billy Adam Calvert	Republican	2020	Meridian	
84	Troy Smith	Republican	2020	Enterprise	
85	Jeffery Harness	Democratic	2019	Fayette	
86	Shane Barnett	Republican	2016	Waynesboro	
87	Joseph Tubb	Republican	2021	Purvis	
88	Charles Blackwell	Republican	2024	Ellisville	
89	Donnie Scoggin	Republican	2017	Ellisville	
90	Noah Sanford	Republican	2016	Collins	
91	Bob Evans	Democratic	2008	Monticello	
92	Becky Currie	Republican	2008	Brookhaven	
93	Timmy Ladner	Republican	2012	Poplarville	
94	Robert Johnson III	Democratic	2004	Natchez	Minority leader
95	Jay McKnight	Republican	2020	Gulfport	
96	Angela Cockerham	Independent	2005	Magnolia	
97	Sam Mims V	Republican	2004	McComb	
98	Daryl Porter Jr.	Democratic	2020	Summit	
99	Bill Pigott	Republican	2008	Tylertown	
100	Ken Morgan	Republican	2007	Morgantown	
101	Kent McCarty	Republican	2019	Hattiesburg	
102	Missy McGee	Republican	2017	Hattiesburg	
103	Percy Watson	Democratic	1980	Hattiesburg	
104	Larry Byrd	Republican	2008	Petal	
105	Elliot Burch	Republican	2024	Lucedale	
106	Jansen Owen	Republican	2020	Poplarville	
107	Steve Lott	Republican	2024	Lucedale	
108	Stacey Hobgood-Wilkes	Republican	2017	Picayune	
109	Manly Barton	Republican	2012	Moss Point	Speaker pro tempore
110	Jeramey Anderson	Democratic	2014	Escatawpa	
111	Jimmy Fondren	Republican	2024	Pascagoula	
112	John Read	Republican	1993	Gautier	
113	Henry Zuber III	Republican	2000	Ocean Springs	
114	Jeffrey S. Guice	Republican	2008	Ocean Springs	
115	Zachary Grady	Republican	2024	D'Iberville	
116	Casey Eure	Republican	2011	Saucier	
117	Kevin Felsher	Republican	2020	Biloxi	
118	Greg Haney	Republican	2012	Gulfport	
119	Jeffrey Hulum III	Democratic	2022	Gulfport	
120	Richard Bennett	Republican	2008	Long Beach	
121	Carolyn Crawford	Republican	2012	Pass Christian	
122	Brent Anderson	Republican	2020	Bay St. Louis	
