= 2023 Mississippi House of Representatives election =

- November 7, 2023

All 122 seats in the Mississippi House of Representatives 62 seats needed for a majority
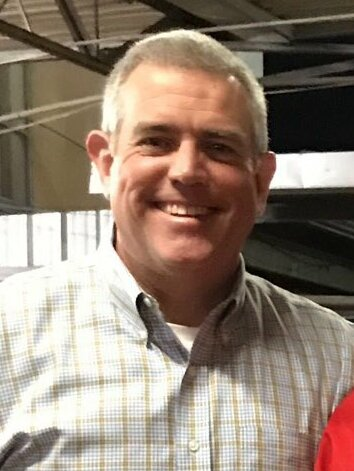

	Majority party	Minority party	Third party
Leader	Philip Gunn (retired)	Robert Johnson III
Party	Republican	Democratic	Independents
Leader since	January 3, 2012	January 7, 2020	N/A
Leader's seat	56th district	94th district	N/A
Seats before	77	42	3
Seats won	79	41	2
Seat change	▲2	▼1	▼1
Popular vote	447,034	247,175	14,284
Percentage	62.19%	34.38%	1.99%
- Results: Democratic hold Democratic gain Republican hold Republican gain Independent hold
Speaker before election
Philip Gunn
Republican
Elected Speaker
Jason White
Republican

The 2023 Mississippi House of Representatives election was held on Tuesday, November 7, 2023, to elect all 122 members of the Mississippi House of Representatives to four-year terms. It was held concurrently with elections for all statewide offices and the Mississippi State Senate. Primary elections took place on August 8.

The 2023 election was the first election held under new district maps following redistricting as a result of the 2020 census.

== Background ==
In the 2019 Mississippi Legislature elections, Republicans expanded their majorities in both chambers to 75 in the House and 36 in the Senate. They had 77 members in the House, five votes short of a two-thirds supermajority, after elected Democrats Kevin Horan and Jon Ray Lancaster switched parties.

In the 2020 Presidential Election, Donald Trump won 79 Mississippi House districts while Joe Biden won 43. Heading into the 2023 Mississippi House election, Democrats held 2 districts Trump won: District 33 (Trump +25%) and District 75 (Trump +41%). Republicans held 2 districts Biden won: District 43 (Biden +1%) and District 102 (Biden +6%). Additionally, Independents held 3 districts: District 45 (Biden +5%), District 64 (Trump +1%), and District 96 (Biden +5%).

2020 Presidential data by House district: Trump: 40–50% 50–60%; 60–70%; 70–80%; 80–90%; 90–100%; Biden: 40–50%; 50–60%; 60–70%; 70–80%; 80–90%; 90–100%

== Retirements ==
Sixteen incumbents did not seek re-election.

=== Democrats ===
1. District 33: Thomas Reynolds II retired.
2. District 57: Edward Blackmon Jr. retired.
3. District 66: De'Keither Stamps retired to successfully run for Public Service Commission Central District.
4. District 69: Alyce Clarke retired.
5. District 75: Tom Miles retired to successfully run for Scott County Chancery Clerk.

=== Independents ===
1. District 45: Michael Evans retired to run for Kemper County Sheriff.

=== Republicans ===
1. District 6: Dana Criswell retired.
2. District 7: Steve Hopkins retired.
3. District 20: Chris Brown retired to successfully run for Public Service Commission Northern District.
4. District 28: Jerry Darnell retired.
5. District 56: Philip Gunn retired.
6. District 58: Joel Bomgar retired.
7. District 62: Tom Weathersby retired.
8. District 88: Robin Robinson retired to successfully run for State Senate.
9. District 111: Charles Busby retired to successfully run for Transportation Commission Southern District.
10. District 115: Randall Patterson retired.

== Resignations and death ==
Three seats were vacant on the day of the general election due to resignations or death in 2022 or 2023.

=== Democrats ===
Two Democrats resigned before the end of their terms.

1. District 27: Kenneth Walker resigned April 2, 2023, to become Assistant Chief for the Natural Resources Conservation Service for the U.S. Department of Agriculture.
2. District 72: Debra Gibbs resigned December 29, 2022, to become a circuit court judge of Hinds County.

=== Republicans ===
One Republican died in office.

1. District 15: Mac Huddleston died August 27, 2023, of multiple myeloma.

== Incumbents defeated ==
=== In primary election ===
Four incumbent representatives, one Democrat and three Republicans, were defeated in the August 8 primary election. Two more incumbent representatives, both Republicans, were defeated in the August 29 primary runoff election.

==== Democrats ====
1. District 51: Rufus Straughter lost renomination to Timaka James-Jones.

==== Republicans ====
1. District 2: Nick Bain lost renomination to Brad Mattox.
2. District 10: Brady Williamson lost renomination to Josh Hawkins.
3. District 23: Perry Van Bailey lost renomination to Andy Stepp.
4. District 105: Dale Goodin lost renomination to Elliot Burch.
5. District 107: Doug McLeod lost renomination to Steve Lott.

== Special elections ==
One special election was held on January 10, 2023, with a runoff on January 31, 2023, to fill a vacancy in District 23. Incumbent Charles Beckett resigned on September 22, 2022, to become executive director of the Mississippi Public Utilities Staff. As with all Mississippi special elections, party labels did not appear on the ballot. The winner, Perry Van Bailey, belongs to the Republican Party.

District	Incumbent			Candidates	Results
District	Member	Party	First elected	Candidates	Results
23	Charles Beckett	Republican	2003	First round: ▌ Andrew Stepp (Nonpartisan) 48.5%; ▌ Perry Van Bailey (Nonpartisan) 38.0%; ▌ Andy Clark (Nonpartisan) 13.5%; Runoff: ▌ ✓ Perry Van Bailey (Nonpartisan) 50.1%; ▌ Andrew Stepp (Nonpartisan) 49.9%	Republican hold

== Overview ==
↓
79	2	41
Republican	I	Democratic

Parties	Candidates	Votes		Seats		
Parties	Candidates	No.	%	Before	After	+/-
Republican	85	447,034	62.19%	77	79	▲2
Democratic	53	247,175	34.38%	42	41	▼1
Independent	5	14,284	1.99%	3	2	▼1
Libertarian	12	9,280	1.29%	0	0	Steady
Green	1	1,075	0.15%	0	0	Steady
Total	157	718,848	100.00%	122	122	

== Predictions ==
Source	Ranking	As of
270toWin	Safe R	November 2, 2023
Elections Daily	Safe R	November 2, 2023

== Results by district ==
District	2020 pres.	Incumbent				Candidates	Result
District	2020 pres.	Member	Party	First elected	Running	Candidates	Result
1	R+74.5	Lester Carpenter	Republican	2007	Yes	▌ ✓ Lester Carpenter (Republican) 100%	Republican hold
2	R+56.3	Nick Bain	Republican	2011	Lost renomination	▌ ✓ Brad Mattox (Republican) 100%	Republican hold
3	R+66.4	William Tracy Arnold	Republican	2011	Yes	▌ ✓ William Tracy Arnold (Republican) 80.2%; ▌Jimmy Russell (Democratic) 19.8%	Republican hold
4	R+62.3	Jody Steverson	Republican	2011	Yes	▌ ✓ Jody Steverson (Republican) 88.3%; ▌Donald Merle Scott (Libertarian) 11.7%	Republican hold
5	D+25.6	John Faulkner	Democratic	2013 (special)	Yes	▌ ✓ John Faulkner (Democratic) 100%	Democratic hold
6	R+18.8	Dana Criswell	Republican	2015	No	▌ ✓ Justin Keen (Republican) 58.7%; ▌Jarvis Cook (Democratic) 39.1%; ▌Amos A. Thompson (Libertarian) 2.2%	Republican hold
7	R+19.5	Steve Hopkins	Republican	2015	No	▌ ✓ Kimberly Remak (Republican) 60.1%; ▌Gail Lyons (Democratic) 39.9%	Republican hold
8	R+43.5	Trey Lamar	Republican	2011	Yes	▌ ✓ Trey Lamar (Republican) 100%	Republican hold
9	D+28.4	Cedric Burnett	Democratic	2015	Yes	▌ ✓ Cedric Burnett (Democratic) 71.2%; ▌Randy Denton (Republican) 28.8%	Democratic hold
10	R+23.0	Brady Williamson	Republican	2019	Lost renomination	▌ ✓ Josh Hawkins (Republican) 100%	Republican hold
11	D+20.7	Lataisha Jackson	Democratic	2013 (special)	Yes	▌ ✓ Lataisha Jackson (Democratic) 100%	Democratic hold
12	R+1.1	Clay Deweese	Republican	2019	Yes	▌ ✓ Clay Deweese (Republican) 62.2%; ▌Donna Niewiaroski (Democratic) 37.8%	Republican hold
13	R+40.5	Steve Massengill	Republican	2011	Yes	▌ ✓ Steve Massengill (Republican) 100%	Republican hold
14	R+61.4	Sam Creekmore IV	Republican	2019	Yes	▌ ✓ Sam Creekmore IV (Republican) 100%	Republican hold
15	R+55.9	Vacant (Note: Republican Representative Mac Huddleston died on August 27, 2023.)				▌ ✓ Beth Luther Waldo (Republican) 100%	Republican hold
16	D+22.3	Rickey W. Thompson	Democratic	2019	Yes	▌ ✓ Rickey W. Thompson (Democratic) 100%	Democratic hold
17	R+26.2	Shane Aguirre	Republican	2015	Yes	▌ ✓ Shane Aguirre (Republican) 100%	Republican hold
18	R+48.2	Jerry Turner	Republican	2003	Yes	▌ ✓ Jerry Turner (Republican) 100%	Republican hold
19	R+67.9	Randy Boyd	Republican	2011	Yes	▌ ✓ Randy Boyd (Republican) 100%	Republican hold
19	R+67.9	Chris Brown	Republican	2011	No	▌ ✓ Randy Boyd (Republican) 100%	Republican loss
20	R+5.3	None (new seat)				▌ ✓ Rodney Hall (Republican) 100%	Republican gain
21	R+75.1	Donnie Bell	Republican	2007	Yes	▌ ✓ Donnie Bell (Republican) 100%	Republican hold
22	R+26.8	Jon Ray Lancaster	Republican	2019	Yes	▌ ✓ Jon Ray Lancaster (Republican) 100%	Republican hold
23	R+56.2	Perry Van Bailey	Republican	2023 (special)	Lost renomination	▌ ✓ Andy Stepp (Republican) 71.9%; ▌Danny Lampley (Democratic) 15.8%; ▌Andy Clark (independent) 12.3%	Republican hold
24	R+38.0	Jeff Hale	Republican	2015	Yes	▌ ✓ Jeff Hale (Republican) 67.3%; ▌David Olds (Democratic) 32.7%	Republican hold
25	R+21.6	Dan Eubanks	Republican	2015	Yes	▌ ✓ Dan Eubanks (Republican) 100%	Republican hold
26	D+40.4	Orlando Paden	Democratic	2015	Yes	▌ ✓ Orlando Paden (Democratic) 100%	Democratic hold
27	D+28.7	Vacant (Note: Democratic Representative Kenneth Walker resigned his seat on April 2, 2023.)				▌ ✓ Kenji Holloway (Democratic) 100%	Democratic hold
28	R+60.2	Jerry Darnell	Republican	2019	No	▌ ✓ W. I. "Doc" Harris (Republican) 100%	Republican hold
29	D+39.8	Robert L. Sanders	Democratic	2021 (special)	Yes	▌ ✓ Robert L. Sanders (Democratic) 100%	Democratic hold
30	D+19.9	Tracey Rosebud	Democratic	2018 (special)	Yes	▌ ✓ Tracey Rosebud (Democratic) 100%	Democratic hold
30	D+19.9	Thomas Reynolds II	Democratic	1979	No	▌ ✓ Tracey Rosebud (Democratic) 100%	Democratic loss
31	D+32.8	Otis Anthony	Democratic	2018 (special)	Yes	▌ ✓ Otis Anthony (Democratic) 100%	Democratic hold
32	D+57.4	Solomon Osborne	Democratic	2019 (special)	Yes	▌ ✓ Solomon Osborne (Democratic) 100%	Democratic hold
33	R+24.6	None (new seat)				▌ ✓ Jim Estrada (Republican) 100%	Republican gain
34	R+25.8	Kevin Horan	Republican	2011	Yes	▌ ✓ Kevin Horan (Republican) 100%	Republican hold
35	R+43.7	Joey Hood	Republican	2011	Yes	▌ ✓ Joey Hood (Republican) 100%	Republican hold
36	D+23.9	Karl Gibbs	Democratic	2013 (special)	Yes	▌ ✓ Karl Gibbs (Democratic) 100%	Democratic hold
37	R+42.1	Andy Boyd	Republican	2022 (special)	Yes	▌ ✓ Andy Boyd (Republican) 100%	Republican hold
38	D+26.0	Cheikh Taylor	Democratic	2017 (special)	Yes	▌ ✓ Cheikh Taylor (Democratic) 100%	Democratic hold
39	R+41.8	Dana McLean	Republican	2019	Yes	▌ ✓ Dana McLean (Republican) 100%	Republican hold
40	D+22.8	Hester Jackson-McCray	Democratic	2019	Yes	▌ ✓ Hester Jackson-McCray (Democratic) 65.7%; ▌Jacob Hisaw (Republican) 34.3%	Democratic hold
41	D+43.9	Kabir Karriem	Democratic	2015	Yes	▌ ✓ Kabir Karriem (Democratic) 79.2%; ▌Claude Simpson (Libertarian) 20.8%	Democratic hold
42	D+33.3	Carl Mickens	Democratic	2015	Yes	▌ ✓ Carl Mickens (Democratic) 88.4%; ▌Shantell Stevens (Libertarian) 11.6%	Democratic hold
43	R+3.2	Rob Roberson	Republican	2015	Yes	▌ ✓ Rob Roberson (Republican) 100%	Republican hold
44	R+55.9	C. Scott Bounds	Republican	2003	Yes	▌ ✓ C. Scott Bounds (Republican) 89.7%; ▌Phillip E. Pope (Libertarian) 10.3%	Republican hold
45	D+11.6	Michael Evans	Independent	2011	No	▌ ✓ Keith Jackson (Democratic) 55.6%; ▌Michael Cassidy (Republican) 37.6%; ▌Trent Rickles (independent) 6.8%	Democratic gain
46	R+32.5	Karl Oliver	Republican	2015	Yes	▌ ✓ Karl Oliver (Republican) 100%	Republican hold
47	D+45.5	Bryant Clark	Democratic	2003	Yes	▌ ✓ Bryant Clark (Democratic) 100%	Democratic hold
48	R+33.8	Jason White	Republican	2011	Yes	▌ ✓ Jason White (Republican) 100%	Republican hold
49	D+38.8	Willie Bailey	Democratic	1994 (special)	Yes	▌ ✓ Willie Bailey (Democratic) 84.8%; ▌Stacy Smith (Libertarian) 15.2%	Democratic hold
50	D+36.6	John Hines	Democratic	2001 (special)	Yes	▌ ✓ John Hines (Democratic) 100%	Democratic hold
51	D+51.5	Rufus Straughter	Democratic	1995	Lost renomination	▌ ✓ Timaka James-Jones (Democratic) 100%	Democratic hold
52	R+22.3	Bill Kinkade	Republican	2012 (special)	Yes	▌ ✓ Bill Kinkade (Republican) 60.7%; ▌Dianne Black (Democratic) 39.3%	Republican hold
53	R+37.1	Vince Mangold	Republican	2015	Yes	▌ ✓ Vince Mangold (Republican) 100%	Republican hold
54	R+37.7	Kevin Ford	Republican	2017 (special)	Yes	▌ ✓ Kevin Ford (Republican) 100%	Republican hold
55	D+37.2	Oscar Denton	Democratic	2013 (special)	Yes	▌ ✓ Oscar Denton (Democratic) 100%	Democratic hold
56	R+17.3	Philip Gunn	Republican	2003	No	▌ ✓ Clay Mansell (Republican) 65.6%; ▌Sharon Moman (Democratic) 34.4%	Republican hold
57	D+43.0	Edward Blackmon Jr.	Democratic	1983	No	▌ ✓ Lawrence Blackmon (Democratic) 100%	Democratic hold
58	R+46.2	Joel Bomgar	Republican	2015	No	▌ ✓ Jonathon McMillan (Republican) 100%	Republican hold
59	R+45.4	Brent Powell	Republican	2013 (special)	Yes	▌ ✓ Brent Powell (Republican) 100%	Republican hold
60	R+41.9	Fred Shanks	Republican	2018 (special)	Yes	▌ ✓ Fred Shanks (Republican) 100%	Republican hold
61	R+42.5	Gene Newman	Republican	2019	Yes	▌ ✓ Gene Newman (Republican) 100%	Republican hold
62	R+52.9	Thomas Weathersby Sr.	Republican	1991	No	▌ ✓ Lance Varner (Republican) 100%	Republican hold
63	D+17.2	Stephanie Foster	Democratic	2019	Yes	▌ ✓ Stephanie Foster (Democratic) 100%	Democratic hold
64	R+3.1	Shanda Yates	Independent	2019	Yes	▌ ✓ Shanda Yates (Independent) 62.2%; ▌Amile Wilson (Republican) 37.8%	Independent hold
65	D+74.1	Chris Bell	Democratic	2015	Yes	▌ ✓ Chris Bell (Democratic) 100%	Democratic hold
66	D+32.2	De'Keither Stamps	Democratic	2020 (special)	No	▌ ✓ Fabian Nelson (Democratic) 100%	Democratic hold
67	D+77.0	Earle S. Banks	Democratic	1993 (special)	Yes	▌ ✓ Earle S. Banks (Democratic) 100%	Democratic hold
68	D+34.8	Zakiya Summers	Democratic	2019	Yes	▌ ✓ Zakiya Summers (Democratic) 100%	Democratic hold
69	D+87.9	Alyce Clarke	Democratic	1984 (special)	No	▌ ✓ Tamarra Butler-Washington (Democratic) 100%	Democratic hold
70	D+70.2	Bo Brown	Democratic	2019	Yes	▌ ✓ Bo Brown (Democratic) 100%	Democratic hold
71	D+58.8	Ronnie Crudup Jr.	Democratic	2019 (special)	Yes	▌ ✓ Ronnie Crudup Jr. (Democratic) 100%	Democratic hold
72	D+58.1	Vacant (Note: Democratic Representative Debra Gibbs resigned her seat on December 29, 2022.)				▌ ✓ Justis Gibbs (Democratic) 100%	Democratic hold
73	R+33.8	Jill Ford	Republican	2019	Yes	▌ ✓ Jill Ford (Republican) 100%	Republican hold
74	R+47.7	Lee Yancey	Republican	2019	Yes	▌ ✓ Lee Yancey (Republican) 100%	Republican hold
75	R+41.6	Tom Miles	Democratic	2011	No	▌ ✓ Celeste Hurst (Republican) 73.4%; ▌Ryshonda Harper Beechem (independent) 26.6%	Republican gain
76	D+23.0	Gregory Holloway Sr.	Democratic	1999	Yes	▌ ✓ Gregory Holloway Sr. (Democratic) 74.1%; ▌Rickey Gene Smylie (Republican) 25.9%	Democratic hold
77	R+41.3	Price Wallace	Republican	2018 (special)	Yes	▌ ✓ Price Wallace (Republican) 100%	Republican hold
78	R+34.6	Randy Rushing	Republican	2011	Yes	▌ ✓ Randy Rushing (Republican) 100%	Republican hold
79	R+53.1	Mark Tullos	Republican	2015	Yes	▌ ✓ Mark Tullos (Republican) 100%	Republican hold
80	D+34.8	Omeria Scott	Democratic	1992 (special)	Yes	▌ ✓ Omeria Scott (Democratic) 100%	Democratic hold
81	R+49.1	Stephen Horne	Republican	2003	Yes	▌ ✓ Stephen Horne (Republican) 100%	Republican hold
82	D+50.7	Charles Young	Democratic	2011	Yes	▌ ✓ Charles Young (Democratic) 100%	Democratic hold
83	R+45.2	Billy Adam Calvert	Republican	2019	Yes	▌ ✓ Billy Adam Calvert (Republican) 100%	Republican hold
84	R+25.2	Troy Smith	Republican	2019	Yes	▌ ✓ Troy Smith (Republican) 100%	Republican hold
85	D+28.8	Jeffery Harness	Democratic	2018 (special)	Yes	▌ ✓ Jeffery Harness (Democratic) 79.9%; ▌Michael Longnecker (Libertarian) 20.1%	Democratic hold
86	R+30.2	Shane Barnett	Republican	2015	Yes	▌ ✓ Shane Barnett (Republican) 65.4%; ▌Annita Bonner (Democratic) 34.6%	Republican hold
87	R+55.1	Joseph Tubb	Republican	2020 (special)	Yes	▌ ✓ Joseph Tubb (Republican) 100%	Republican hold
88	R+75.1	Robin Robinson	Republican	2020 (special)	No	▌ ✓ Charles "Chuck" Blackwell (Republican) 100%	Republican hold
89	R+51.8	Donnie Scoggin	Republican	2016 (special)	Yes	▌ ✓ Donnie Scoggin (Republican) 100%	Republican hold
90	R+25.1	Noah Sanford	Republican	2015	Yes	▌ ✓ Noah Sanford (Republican) 100%	Republican hold
91	D+9.1	Robert Evans	Democratic	2007	Yes	▌ ✓ Robert Evans (Democratic) 66.1%; ▌Steve Moreman (Republican) 33.9%	Democratic hold
92	R+53.6	Becky Currie	Republican	2007	Yes	▌ ✓ Becky Currie (Republican) 100%	Republican hold
93	R+67.1	Timmy Ladner	Republican	2011	Yes	▌ ✓ Timmy Ladner (Republican) 100%	Republican hold
94	D+42.7	Robert Johnson III	Democratic	2003	Yes	▌ ✓ Robert Johnson III (Democratic) 100%	Democratic hold
95	R+60.6	Jay McKnight	Republican	2019	Yes	▌ ✓ Jay McKnight (Republican) 100%	Republican hold
96	D+9.1	Angela Cockerham	Independent	2005 (special)	Yes	▌ ✓ Angela Cockerham (independent) 100%	Independent hold
97	R+40.6	Sam Mims V	Republican	2003	Yes	▌ ✓ Sam Mims V (Republican) 69.4%; ▌Thompson Benton (Democratic) 30.6%	Republican hold
98	D+27.1	Daryl Porter Jr.	Democratic	2019	Yes	▌ ✓ Daryl Porter Jr. (Democratic) 100%	Democratic hold
99	R+47.2	Bill Pigott	Republican	2007	Yes	▌ ✓ Bill Pigott (Republican) 84.2%; ▌Gregory Fortenberry (Green) 15.8%	Republican hold
100	R+43.3	Ken Morgan	Republican	2006 (special)	Yes	▌ ✓ Ken Morgan (Republican) 100%	Republican hold
101	R+34.3	Kent McCarty	Republican	2019 (special)	Yes	▌ ✓ Kent McCarty (Republican) 100%	Republican hold
102	D+2.7	Missy McGee	Republican	2017 (special)	Yes	▌ ✓ Missy McGee (Republican) 100%	Republican hold
103	D+53.3	Percy Watson	Democratic	1979	Yes	▌ ✓ Percy Watson (Democratic) 100%	Democratic hold
104	R+63.8	Larry Byrd	Republican	2007	Yes	▌ ✓ Larry Byrd (Republican) 86.5%; ▌Melissa D Brady (Libertarian) 13.5%	Republican hold
105	R+65.1	Dale Goodin	Republican	2019	Lost renomination	▌ ✓ Elliot Burch (Republican) 83.0%; ▌Matthew Daves (Democratic) 17.0%	Republican hold
106	R+59.5	Jansen Owen	Republican	2019	Yes	▌ ✓ Jansen Owen (Republican) 100%	Republican hold
107	R+69.6	Doug McLeod	Republican	2011	Lost renomination	▌ ✓ Steve Lott (Republican) 100%	Republican hold
108	R+55.5	Stacey Hobgood-Wilkes	Republican	2017 (special)	Yes	▌ ✓ Stacey Hobgood-Wilkes (Republican) 100%	Republican hold
109	R+82.1	Manly Barton	Republican	2011	Yes	▌ ✓ Manly Barton (Republican) 100%	Republican hold
110	D+41.5	Jeramey Anderson	Democratic	2013 (special)	Yes	▌ ✓ Jeramey Anderson (Democratic) 100%	Democratic hold
111	R+48.6	Charles Busby	Republican	2011	No	▌ ✓ Jimmy Fondren (Republican) 100%	Republican hold
112	R+35.5	John Read	Republican	1992 (special)	Yes	▌ ✓ John Read (Republican) 100%	Republican hold
113	R+36.8	Henry Zuber III	Republican	1999	Yes	▌ ✓ Henry Zuber III (Republican) 100%	Republican hold
114	R+49.0	Jeffrey S. Guice	Republican	2008 (special)	Yes	▌ ✓ Jeffrey S. Guice (Republican) 82.1%; ▌Casey Whitehead (Libertarian) 17.9%	Republican hold
115	R+11.0	Randall Patterson	Republican	2003	No	▌ ✓ Zachary Grady (Republican) 100%	Republican hold
116	R+58.8	Casey Eure	Republican	2011 (special)	Yes	▌ ✓ Casey Eure (Republican) 100%	Republican hold
117	R+29.1	Kevin Felsher	Republican	2019	Yes	▌ ✓ Kevin Felsher (Republican) 100%	Republican hold
118	R+23.4	Greg Haney	Republican	2011	Yes	▌ ✓ Greg Haney (Republican) 100%	Republican hold
119	D+55.7	Jeffrey Hulum III	Democratic	2022 (special)	Yes	▌ ✓ Jeffrey Hulum III (Democratic) 100%	Democratic hold
120	R+38.3	Richard Bennett	Republican	2007	Yes	▌ ✓ Richard Bennett (Republican) 80.0%; ▌Cameron Roberson (Libertarian) 20.0%	Republican hold
121	R+35.8	Carolyn Crawford	Republican	2011	Yes	▌ ✓ Carolyn Crawford (Republican) 63.0%; ▌John Dedeaux (Democratic) 37.0%	Republican hold
122	R+42.7	Brent Anderson	Republican	2019	Yes	▌ ✓ Brent Anderson (Republican) 78.8%; ▌Brice L. Phillips (Libertarian) 21.2%	Republican hold

== See also ==
- 2023 United States state legislative elections
- 2023 Mississippi State Senate election
