= 2015 Mississippi House of Representatives election =

- November 3, 2015

All 122 seats in the Mississippi House of Representatives 62 seats needed for a majority

	Majority party	Minority party
Leader	Philip Gunn	Bobby Moak (lost re-election)
Party	Republican	Democratic
Leader since	January 3, 2012	January 3, 2012
Leader's seat	56th — Clinton	53rd — Bogue Chitto
Last election	63, 52.62%	59, 46.11%
Seats before	67 (Note: District 41 was vacant at the time of the election; and Representatives Donnie Bell, Jason White, and Randall Patterson switched parties to caucus with the Republicans)	54
Seats won	73 (Note: Two days after the election, Steverson switched his party registration to Republican.)	49
Seat change	▲6	▼5
Popular vote	363,667	298,355
Percentage	54.5%	44.7%
Swing	▲0.9%	▼0.4%
- Winners: Republican Hold Democratic Hold; Republican Gain Democratic Gain; Winner vote shares: Republican: 50-60% 60-70% 70-80% 80-90% >90% Democrat: 50-60% 60-70% 70-80% 80-90% >90% Tie: 50%
Speaker before election
Philip Gunn
Republican
Elected Speaker
Philip Gunn
Republican

The 2015 Mississippi House of Representatives elections were held on November 3, 2015. All 122 seats in the Mississippi House of Representatives were up for election. Primary elections took place on August 4, 2015, with runoffs held on August 25, 2015 if no candidate received a majority.

== Background ==
Mississippi Republicans took control of the state legislature for the first time since Reconstruction in the 2011 elections, putting them in control of redistricting. The State House released their proposed map in April 2012, pairing 3 sets of Democratic incumbents and 2 sets of incumbents of both parties together. The Justice Department subsequently approved the maps under Section 5 of the Voting Rights Act in September.

The Mississippi Democratic Party focused their 2015 campaigning efforts on trying to regain control of the Mississippi House of Representatives, as the simultaneous gubernatorial election was viewed as non-competitive.

== Results ==
=== Overview ===
↓
73	49
Republican	Democratic

Parties	Candidates	Seats				Popular Vote		
Parties	Candidates	2011	2015	+/-	Strength	Votes	%	Change
Republican	–	67	73	▲6	59.8%	363,667	54.49	▲0.87%
Democratic	–	54	49	▼5	40.2%	298,355	44.71	▼0.40%
Independent	–	0	0	–	0.00%	4,756	0.71	▼0.11%
Libertarian	–	0	0	–	0.00%	600	0.09	▼0.36%
Reform	–	0	0	–	0.00%	0	0.00	▼0.11%
Write-ins	–	0	0	–	0.00%	–	–	–
Total	201	100	100	–	100.00%	667,378	100.00	–
Turnout						–	–	
Registered						–		

=== Close races ===
Seats where the margin of victory was under 10%:

1. District 79, 0.06% (gain)
2. District 86, 9.04% (gain)
3. District 122, 2.16%

== Results by district ==
=== District 1 ===
2015 Mississippi's 1st House of Representatives district Republican primary election
Party	Candidate	Votes	%
Republican	Lester E. "Bubba" Carpenter (incumbent)	772	100.0%
Total votes		772	100.0%

2015 Mississippi's 1st House of Representatives district election
Party	Candidate	Votes	%
Republican	Lester E. "Bubba" Carpenter (incumbent)	5,156	66.57%
Democratic	Lisa Benderman Wigginton	2,589	33.43%
Total votes		7,745	100.0%

=== District 2 ===
2015 Mississippi's 2nd House of Representatives district Republican primary election
Party	Candidate	Votes	%
Republican	Billy Miller	617	100.0%
Total votes		617	100.0%

2015 Mississippi's 2nd House of Representatives district election
Party	Candidate	Votes	%
Democratic	Nick Bain (incumbent)	4,751	75.76%
Republican	Billy Miller	1,520	24.24%
Total votes		6,271	100.0%

=== District 3 ===
2015 Mississippi's 3rd House of Representatives district Republican primary election
Party	Candidate	Votes	%
Republican	William Tracy Arnold (incumbent)	594	100.0%
Total votes		594	100.0%

2015 Mississippi's 3rd House of Representatives district Democratic primary election
Party	Candidate	Votes	%
Democratic	Lauren Childers	3,179	68.54%
Democratic	Jimmy Wayne Russell	1,459	31.46%
Total votes		4,638	100.0%

2015 Mississippi's 3rd House of Representatives district election
Party	Candidate	Votes	%
Republican	William Tracy Arnold (incumbent)	3,734	57.54%
Democratic	Lauren Childers	2,756	42.47%
Total votes		6,490	100.0%

=== District 4 ===
2015 Mississippi's 4th House of Representatives district election
Party	Candidate	Votes	%
Democratic	Jody Steverson (incumbent)	5,935	100.0%
Total votes		5,935	100.0%

=== District 5 ===
2015 Mississippi's 5th House of Representatives district election
Party	Candidate	Votes	%
Democratic	John Faulkner (incumbent)	3,962	100.0%
Total votes		3,962	100.0%

=== District 6 ===
2015 Mississippi's 6th House of Representatives district Republican primary election
Party	Candidate	Votes	%
Republican	Dana Criswell	2,004	57.14%
Republican	Eugene F. Hamilton (incumbent)	1,503	42.86%
Total votes		3,507	100.0%

2015 Mississippi's 6th House of Representatives district election
Party	Candidate	Votes	%
Republican	Dana Criswell	2,818	100.0%
Total votes		2,818	100.0%

=== District 7 ===
2015 Mississippi's 7th House of Representatives district Republican primary election
Party	Candidate	Votes	%
Republican	Steve Hopkins	1,719	53.70%
Republican	Wanda Jennings (incumbent)	1,482	46.30%
Total votes		3,201	100.0%

2015 Mississippi's 7th House of Representatives district election
Party	Candidate	Votes	%
Republican	Steve Hopkins	2,682	100.0%
Total votes		2,682	100.0%

=== District 8 ===
2015 Mississippi's 8th House of Representatives district Republican primary election
Party	Candidate	Votes	%
Republican	John T. "Trey" Lamar, III (incumbent)	974	100.0%
Total votes		974	100.0%

2015 Mississippi's 8th House of Representatives district election
Party	Candidate	Votes	%
Republican	John T. "Trey" Lamar, III (incumbent)	3,923	100.0%
Total votes		3,923	100.0%

=== District 9 ===
2015 Mississippi's 9th House of Representatives district Republican primary election
Party	Candidate	Votes	%
Republican	Christopher Thomas, Sr.	139	100.0%
Total votes		139	100.0%

2015 Mississippi's 9th House of Representatives district Democratic primary election
Party	Candidate	Votes	%
Democratic	Cedric Burnett	2,033	59.27%
Democratic	Marilyn L. Young	1,397	40.73%
Total votes		3,430	100.0%

2015 Mississippi's 9th House of Representatives district election
Party	Candidate	Votes	%
Democratic	Cedric Burnett	4,467	70.37%
Republican	Christopher Thomas, Sr.	1,881	29.63%
Total votes		6,348	100.0%

=== District 10 ===
2015 Mississippi's 10th House of Representatives district Republican primary election
Party	Candidate	Votes	%
Republican	Nolan Mettetal (incumbent)	806	100.0%
Total votes		806	100.0%

2015 Mississippi's 10th House of Representatives district election
Party	Candidate	Votes	%
Republican	Nolan Mettetal (incumbent)	6,143	75.94%
Independent	Ken Daugherty	1,943	24.06%
Total votes		8,077	100.0%

=== District 11 ===
2015 Mississippi's 11th House of Representatives district Democratic primary election
Party	Candidate	Votes	%
Democratic	Lataisha Jackson (incumbent)	3,067	70.86%
Democratic	Michael Cathey	1,261	29.14%
Total votes		4,328	100.0%

2015 Mississippi's 11th House of Representatives district election
Party	Candidate	Votes	%
Democratic	Lataisha Jackson (incumbent)	5,615	100.0%
Total votes		5,615	100.0%

=== District 12 ===
2015 Mississippi's 12th House of Representatives district Republican primary election
Party	Candidate	Votes	%
Republican	Brad Mayo (incumbent)	728	100.0%
Total votes		728	100.0%

2015 Mississippi's 12th House of Representatives district election
Party	Candidate	Votes	%
Democratic	J. P. Hughes Jr.	2,442	55.10%
Republican	Brad Mayo (incumbent)	1,990	44.90%
Total votes		4,432	100.0%

=== District 13 ===
2015 Mississippi's 13th House of Representatives district Republican primary election
Party	Candidate	Votes	%
Republican	Steve Massengill (incumbent)	561	100.0%
Total votes		561	100.0%

2015 Mississippi's 13th House of Representatives district election
Party	Candidate	Votes	%
Republican	Steve Massengill (incumbent)	4,416	58.76%
Democratic	Justin Cluck	3,099	41.24%
Total votes		7,515	100.0%

=== District 14 ===
2015 Mississippi's 14th House of Representatives district Republican primary election
Party	Candidate	Votes	%
Republican	Margaret Rogers (incumbent)	1,056	100.0%
Total votes		1,056	100.0%

2015 Mississippi's 14th House of Representatives district election
Party	Candidate	Votes	%
Republican	Margaret Rogers (incumbent)	5,800	100.0%
Total votes		5,800	100.0%

=== District 15 ===
2015 Mississippi's 15th House of Representatives district Republican primary election
Party	Candidate	Votes	%
Republican	Mac Huddleston (incumbent)	899	100.0%
Total votes		899	100.0%

2015 Mississippi's 15th House of Representatives district election
Party	Candidate	Votes	%
Republican	Mac Huddleston (incumbent)	5,927	100.0%
Total votes		5,927	100.0%

=== District 16 ===
2015 Mississippi's 16th House of Representatives district election
Party	Candidate	Votes	%
Democratic	Steve Holland (incumbent)	3,527	100.0%
Total votes		3,527	100.0%

=== District 17 ===
2015 Mississippi's 17th House of Representatives district Republican primary election
Party	Candidate	Votes	%
Republican	Shane Aguirre	2,596	64.61%
Republican	Mark Prince	1,422	35.39%
Total votes		4,018	100.0%

2015 Mississippi's 17th House of Representatives district Democratic primary election
Party	Candidate	Votes	%
Democratic	Charles Penson	598	77.97%
Democratic	Jim Newman	169	22.03%
Total votes		767	100.0%

2015 Mississippi's 17th House of Representatives district election
Party	Candidate	Votes	%
Republican	Shane Aguirre	4,384	75.80%
Democratic	Charles Penson	1,400	24.20%
Total votes		5,784	100.0%

=== District 18 ===
2015 Mississippi's 18th House of Representatives district Republican primary election
Party	Candidate	Votes	%
Republican	Jerry Turner (incumbent)	3,766	100.0%
Total votes		3,766	100.0%

2015 Mississippi's 18th House of Representatives district election
Party	Candidate	Votes	%
Republican	Jerry Turner (incumbent)	5,100	100.0%
Total votes		5,100	100.0%

=== District 19 ===
2015 Mississippi's 19th House of Representatives district Republican primary election
Party	Candidate	Votes	%
Republican	Randy Boyd (incumbent)	2,016	58.62%
Republican	Peggy Schumpert Hussey	1,423	41.38%
Total votes		3,439	100.0%

2015 Mississippi's 19th House of Representatives district election
Party	Candidate	Votes	%
Republican	Randy Boyd (incumbent)	3,924	63.69%
Democratic	Clint Gannon	2,237	36.31%
Total votes		6,161	100.0%

=== District 20 ===
2015 Mississippi's 20th House of Representatives district Republican primary election
Party	Candidate	Votes	%
Republican	Chris Brown (incumbent)	1,306	100.0%
Total votes		1,306	100.0%

2015 Mississippi's 20th House of Representatives district election
Party	Candidate	Votes	%
Republican	Chris Brown (incumbent)	4,513	64.43%
Democratic	William "Bo" Miller	2,491	35.57%
Total votes		7,004	100.0%

=== District 21 ===
2015 Mississippi's 21st House of Representatives district Republican primary election
Party	Candidate	Votes	%
Republican	Donnie Bell (incumbent)	740	100.0%
Total votes		740	100.0%

2015 Mississippi's 21st House of Representatives district election
Party	Candidate	Votes	%
Republican	Donnie Bell (incumbent)	4,125	59.90%
Democratic	Aaron L. Loden	2,761	40.10%
Total votes		6,886	100.0%

=== District 22 ===
2015 Mississippi's 22nd House of Representatives district election
Party	Candidate	Votes	%
Democratic	Preston Sullivan (incumbent)	6,875	100.0%
Total votes		6,875	100.0%

=== District 23 ===
2015 Mississippi's 23rd House of Representatives district Republican primary election
Party	Candidate	Votes	%
Republican	Charles Beckett (incumbent)	266	100.0%
Total votes		266	100.0%

2015 Mississippi's 23rd House of Representatives district election
Party	Candidate	Votes	%
Republican	Charles Beckett (incumbent)	6,817	100.0%
Total votes		6,817	100.0%

=== District 24 ===
2015 Mississippi's 24th House of Representatives district Republican primary election
Party	Candidate	Votes	%
Republican	Jeff Hale	1,424	37.22%
Republican	Rob Goudy	1,270	33.19%
Republican	Les Hooper	780	20.39%
Republican	Rick Clifton	352	9.20%
Total votes		3,826	100.0%

2015 Mississippi's 24th House of Representatives district Republican primary runoff election
Party	Candidate	Votes	%
Republican	Jeff Hale	1,672	50.20%
Republican	Rob Goudy	1,659	49.80%
Total votes		3,331	100.0%

2015 Mississippi's 24th House of Representatives district election
Party	Candidate	Votes	%
Republican	Jeff Hale	2,968	100.0%
Total votes		2,968	100.0%

=== District 25 ===
2015 Mississippi's 25th House of Representatives district Republican primary election
Party	Candidate	Votes	%
Republican	Dan Eubanks	1,478	53.43%
Republican	Gene Alday (incumbent)	708	25.60%
Republican	Julian Chandler Bramlett	580	20.97%
Total votes		2,766	100.0%

2015 Mississippi's 25th House of Representatives district election
Party	Candidate	Votes	%
Republican	Dan Eubanks	2,245	73.63%
Democratic	Harold D. Harris	804	26.37%
Total votes		3,049	100.0%

=== District 26 ===
2015 Mississippi's 26th House of Representatives district Democratic primary election
Party	Candidate	Votes	%
Democratic	Orlando Paden	2,639	56.99%
Democratic	Sanford Johnson	1,992	43.01%
Total votes		4,631	100.0%

2015 Mississippi's 26th House of Representatives district election
Party	Candidate	Votes	%
Democratic	Orlando Paden	3,180	100.0%
Total votes		3,180	100.0%

=== District 27 ===
2015 Mississippi's 27th House of Representatives district Democratic primary election
Party	Candidate	Votes	%
Democratic	Kenneth Walker	550	44.82%
Democratic	Leroy Lacy	403	32.84%
Democratic	Bulus E. Leflore, Jr.	274	22.33%
Total votes		1,227	100.0%

2015 Mississippi's 27th House of Representatives district Democratic primary runoff election
Party	Candidate	Votes	%
Democratic	Kenneth Walker	1,650	52.22%
Democratic	Leroy Lacy	1,510	47.78%
Total votes		3,160	100.0%

2015 Mississippi's 27th House of Representatives district Republican primary election
Party	Candidate	Votes	%
Republican	Ricky Dewayne Gill	711	100.0%
Total votes		711	100.0%

2015 Mississippi's 27th House of Representatives district election
Party	Candidate	Votes	%
Democratic	Kenneth Walker	4,196	71.69%
Republican	Ricky Dewayne Gill	1,657	28.31%
Total votes		5,853	100.0%

=== District 28 ===
2015 Mississippi's 28th House of Representatives district Republican primary election
Party	Candidate	Votes	%
Republican	Robert Foster	3,819	58.15%
Republican	Les Green	2,748	41.85%
Total votes		6,567	100.0%

2015 Mississippi's 28th House of Representatives district election
Party	Candidate	Votes	%
Republican	Robert Foster	4,414	100.0%
Total votes		4,414	100.0%

=== District 29 ===
2015 Mississippi's 29th House of Representatives district election
Party	Candidate	Votes	%
Democratic	Linda F. Coleman (incumbent)	5,696	100.0%
Total votes		5,696	100.0%

=== District 30 ===
2015 Mississippi's 30th House of Representatives district Democratic primary election
Party	Candidate	Votes	%
Democratic	Robert E. Huddleston (incumbent)	1,416	32.07%
Democratic	Lester Williams	1,194	27.04%
Democratic	Tracey Rosebud	907	20.54%
Democratic	Zack Huffman	899	20.36%
Total votes		4,416	100.0%

2015 Mississippi's 30th House of Representatives district Democratic primary runoff election
Party	Candidate	Votes	%
Democratic	Robert E. Huddleston (incumbent)	1,881	62.22%
Democratic	Lester Williams	1,142	37.78%
Total votes		3,023	100.0%

2015 Mississippi's 30th House of Representatives district election
Party	Candidate	Votes	%
Democratic	Robert E. Huddleston (incumbent)	3,813	100.0%
Total votes		3,813	100.0%

=== District 31 ===
2015 Mississippi's 31st House of Representatives district Democratic primary election
Party	Candidate	Votes	%
Democratic	Sara Richardson Thomas (incumbent)	3,209	67.20%
Democratic	Charles Modley	1,566	32.80%
Total votes		4,775	100.0%

2015 Mississippi's 31st House of Representatives district election
Party	Candidate	Votes	%
Democratic	Sara Richardson Thomas (incumbent)	5,045	100.0%
Total votes		5,045	100.0%

=== District 32 ===
2015 Mississippi's 32nd House of Representatives district election
Party	Candidate	Votes	%
Democratic	Willie J. Perkins, Sr. (incumbent)	3,533	100.0%
Total votes		3,533	100.0%

=== District 33 ===
2015 Mississippi's 33rd House of Representatives district Republican primary election
Party	Candidate	Votes	%
Republican	Jerrerico Chambers	141	100.0%
Total votes		141	100.0%

2015 Mississippi's 33rd House of Representatives district election
Party	Candidate	Votes	%
Democratic	Thomas Reynolds II (incumbent)	5,537	76.68%
Republican	Jerrerico Chambers	1,684	23.32%
Total votes		7,221	100.0%

=== District 34 ===
2015 Mississippi's 34th House of Representatives district Democratic primary election
Party	Candidate	Votes	%
Democratic	Kevin Horan (incumbent) (Note: Redistricted from the 24th district.)	3,748	66.48%
Democratic	Reta Holden	1,890	33.52%
Total votes		5,638	100.0%

2015 Mississippi's 34th House of Representatives district election
Party	Candidate	Votes	%
Democratic	Kevin Horan (incumbent)	6,324	100.0%
Total votes		6,324	100.0%

=== District 35 ===
2015 Mississippi's 35th House of Representatives district Republican primary election
Party	Candidate	Votes	%
Republican	Joey Hood (incumbent)	1,058	68.79%
Republican	Brian Sims	480	31.21%
Total votes		1,538	100.0%

2015 Mississippi's 35th House of Representatives district election
Party	Candidate	Votes	%
Republican	Joey Hood (incumbent)	4,654	57.32%
Democratic	Patrick Warner	3,465	42.68%
Total votes		8,119	100.0%

=== District 36 ===
2015 Mississippi's 36th House of Representatives district Democratic primary election
Party	Candidate	Votes	%
Democratic	Karl Malinski Gibbs (incumbent)	2,584	40.89%
Democratic	Jimmy Davidson	2,130	33.71%
Democratic	Edward N. Houston, Jr.	1,605	25.40%
Total votes		6,319	100.0%

2015 Mississippi's 36th House of Representatives district Democratic primary runoff election
Party	Candidate	Votes	%
Democratic	Karl Malinski Gibbs (incumbent)	2,037	57.87%
Democratic	Jimmy Davidson	1,483	42.13%
Total votes		3,520	100.0%

2015 Mississippi's 36th House of Representatives district election
Party	Candidate	Votes	%
Democratic	Karl Malinski Gibbs (incumbent)	6,087	100.0%
Total votes		6,087	100.0%

=== District 37 ===
2015 Mississippi's 37th House of Representatives district Republican primary election
Party	Candidate	Votes	%
Republican	Gary A. Chism (incumbent)	298	100.0%
Total votes		298	100.0%

2015 Mississippi's 37th House of Representatives district election
Party	Candidate	Votes	%
Republican	Gary A. Chism (incumbent)	6,859	100.0%
Total votes		6,859	100.0%

=== District 38 ===
2015 Mississippi's 38nd House of Representatives district election
Party	Candidate	Votes	%
Democratic	Tyrone Ellis (incumbent)	5,389	100.0%
Total votes		5,389	100.0%

=== District 39 ===
2015 Mississippi's 39th House of Representatives district Republican primary election
Party	Candidate	Votes	%
Republican	Jeffrey C. Smith (incumbent)	329	100.0%
Total votes		329	100.0%

2015 Mississippi's 39th House of Representatives district election
Party	Candidate	Votes	%
Republican	Jeffrey C. Smith (incumbent)	5,020	74.97%
Democratic	James E. Samuel, Sr.	1,676	25.03%
Total votes		6,696	100.0%

=== District 40 ===
2015 Mississippi's 40th House of Representatives district Republican primary election
Party	Candidate	Votes	%
Republican	Ashley Henley	799	56.59%
Republican	Pat Nelson (incumbent)	613	43.41%
Total votes		1,412	100.0%

2015 Mississippi's 40th House of Representatives district Democratic primary election
Party	Candidate	Votes	%
Democratic	Hester Jackson-McCray	76	51.35%
Democratic	Francis J. Miller	72	48.65%
Total votes		148	100.0%

2015 Mississippi's 40th House of Representatives district election
Party	Candidate	Votes	%
Republican	Ashley Henley	1,173	68.32%
Democratic	Hester Jackson-McCray	544	31.68%
Total votes		1,717	100.0%

=== District 41 ===
2015 Mississippi's 41st House of Representatives district election
Party	Candidate	Votes	%
Democratic	Kabir Karriem	5,140	100.0%
Total votes		5,140	100.0%

=== District 42 ===
2015 Mississippi's 42nd House of Representatives district Democratic primary election
Party	Candidate	Votes	%
Democratic	Carl L. Mickens	3,258	43.31%
Democratic	Eugene Crosby	2,493	33.14%
Democratic	Reecy Lathan Dickson (incumbent)	1,772	23.55%
Total votes		7,523	100.0%

2015 Mississippi's 42nd House of Representatives district Democratic primary runoff election
Party	Candidate	Votes	%
Democratic	Carl L. Mickens	3,265	54.37%
Democratic	Eugene Crosby	2,740	45.63%
Total votes		6,005	100.0%

2015 Mississippi's 42nd House of Representatives district election
Party	Candidate	Votes	%
Democratic	Carl L. Mickens	5,799	77.18%
Independent	Dorothy Baker Hines	1,715	22.82%
Total votes		7,514	100.0%

=== District 43 ===
2015 Mississippi's 43rd House of Representatives district Republican primary election
Party	Candidate	Votes	%
Republican	Loyd B. "Rob" Roberson	1,530	66.87%
Republican	Mac Smith	758	33.13%
Total votes		2,288	100.0%

2015 Mississippi's 43rd House of Representatives district election
Party	Candidate	Votes	%
Republican	Loyd B. "Rob" Roberson	3,484	63.86%
Democratic	Paul Millsaps	1,972	36.14%
Total votes		5,456	100.0%

=== District 44 ===
2015 Mississippi's 44th House of Representatives district Republican primary election
Party	Candidate	Votes	%
Republican	C. Scott Bounds (incumbent)	5,366	100.0%
Total votes		5,366	100.0%

2015 Mississippi's 44th House of Representatives district election
Party	Candidate	Votes	%
Republican	C. Scott Bounds (incumbent)	6,075	100.0%
Total votes		6,075	100.0%

=== District 45 ===
2015 Mississippi's 45th House of Representatives district Democratic primary election
Party	Candidate	Votes	%
Democratic	Michael Ted Evans (incumbent)	501	53.41%
Democratic	Clark Adams	437	46.59%
Total votes		938	100.0%

2015 Mississippi's 45th House of Representatives district election
Party	Candidate	Votes	%
Democratic	Michael Ted Evans (incumbent)	5,544	100.0%
Total votes		5,544	100.0%

=== District 46 ===
2015 Mississippi's 46th House of Representatives district Republican primary election
Party	Candidate	Votes	%
Republican	Karl Oliver	766	43.23%
Republican	Shed Hill Hunger, IV	506	28.56%
Republican	James Matthew Bennett	500	28.22%
Total votes		1,772	100.0%

2015 Mississippi's 46th House of Representatives district Republican primary runoff election
Party	Candidate	Votes	%
Republican	Karl Oliver	522	60.21%
Republican	Shed Hill Hunger, IV	345	39.79%
Total votes		867	100.0%

2015 Mississippi's 46th House of Representatives district election
Party	Candidate	Votes	%
Republican	Karl Oliver	5,139	56.90%
Democratic	Ken Strachan	3,893	43.10%
Total votes		9,032	100.0%

=== District 47 ===
2015 Mississippi's 47th House of Representatives district election
Party	Candidate	Votes	%
Democratic	Bryant W. Clark (incumbent)	4,829	100.0%
Total votes		4,829	100.0%

=== District 48 ===
2015 Mississippi's 48th House of Representatives district Republican primary election
Party	Candidate	Votes	%
Republican	Jason White (incumbent)	1,229	100.0%
Total votes		1,229	100.0%

2015 Mississippi's 48th House of Representatives district election
Party	Candidate	Votes	%
Republican	Jason White (incumbent)	4,512	68.99%
Democratic	Jill Butler	2,028	31.01%
Total votes		6,540	100.0%

=== District 49 ===
2015 Mississippi's 49th House of Representatives district election
Party	Candidate	Votes	%
Democratic	Willie L. Bailey (incumbent)	3,352	100.0%
Total votes		3,352	100.0%

=== District 50 ===
2015 Mississippi's 50th House of Representatives district election
Party	Candidate	Votes	%
Democratic	John Hines, Sr. (incumbent)	4,450	100.0%
Total votes		4,450	100.0%

=== District 51 ===
2015 Mississippi's 51th House of Representatives district election
Party	Candidate	Votes	%
Democratic	Rufus E. "Pete" Straughter (incumbent)	5,204	100.0%
Total votes		5,204	100.0%

=== District 52 ===
2015 Mississippi's 52nd House of Representatives district election
Party	Candidate	Votes	%
Republican	William Kinkade (incumbent)	2,335	100.0%
Total votes		2,335	100.0%

=== District 53 ===
Republicans had heavily targeted House Democratic leader Bobby Moak, who had been left uncontested in 2011. Republican Vince Mangold ultimately prevailed, in what Mississippi Democratic party chairman Rickey Cole described as an upset victory.

2015 Mississippi's 53rd House of Representatives district Republican primary election
Party	Candidate	Votes	%
Republican	Vince Mangold	2,771	100.0%
Total votes		2,771	100.0%

2015 Mississippi's 53rd House of Representatives district election
Party	Candidate	Votes	%
Republican	Vince Mangold	4,389	55.92%
Democratic	Bobby Moak (incumbent)	3,460	44.08%
Total votes		7,849	100.0%

=== District 54 ===
2015 Mississippi's 54th House of Representatives district Republican primary election
Party	Candidate	Votes	%
Republican	Alex Monsour (incumbent)	2,917	100.0%
Total votes		2,917	100.0%

2015 Mississippi's 54th House of Representatives district election
Party	Candidate	Votes	%
Republican	Alex Monsour (incumbent)	5,777	100.0%
Total votes		5,777	100.0%

=== District 55 ===
2015 Mississippi's 55th House of Representatives district Democratic primary election
Party	Candidate	Votes	%
Democratic	Oscar Denton (incumbent)	1,496	76.17%
Democratic	Chris Green	436	22.20%
Democratic	Arrick Rice	32	1.63%
Total votes		1,964	100.0%

2015 Mississippi's 45th House of Representatives district election
Party	Candidate	Votes	%
Democratic	Oscar Denton (incumbent)	4,678	100.0%
Total votes		4,678	100.0%

=== District 56 ===
2015 Mississippi's 56th House of Representatives district Republican primary election
Party	Candidate	Votes	%
Republican	Philip Gunn (incumbent)	1,194	100.0%
Total votes		1,194	100.0%

2015 Mississippi's 56th House of Representatives district election
Party	Candidate	Votes	%
Republican	Philip Gunn (incumbent)	6,934	100.0%
Total votes		6,934	100.0%

=== District 57 ===
2015 Mississippi's 57th House of Representatives district election
Party	Candidate	Votes	%
Democratic	Edward Blackmon, Jr. (incumbent)	4,192	100.0%
Total votes		4,192	100.0%

=== District 58 ===
2015 Mississippi's 58th House of Representatives district Republican primary election
Party	Candidate	Votes	%
Republican	Joel Bomgar	4,272	67.83%
Republican	Bruce Bartley	2,026	32.17%
Total votes		6,298	100.0%

2015 Mississippi's 58th House of Representatives district election
Party	Candidate	Votes	%
Republican	Joel Bomgar	7,151	100.0%
Total votes		7,151	100.0%

=== District 59 ===
2015 Mississippi's 59th House of Representatives district Republican primary election
Party	Candidate	Votes	%
Republican	Brent Powell (incumbent)	4,344	100.0%
Total votes		4,344	100.0%

2015 Mississippi's 59th House of Representatives district election
Party	Candidate	Votes	%
Republican	Brent Powell (incumbent)	5,697	100.0%
Total votes		5,697	100.0%

=== District 60 ===
2015 Mississippi's 60th House of Representatives district Republican primary election
Party	Candidate	Votes	%
Republican	John L. Moore (incumbent)	3,537	70.40%
Republican	Paul J. Buisson	1,487	29.60%
Total votes		5,024	100.0%

2015 Mississippi's 60th House of Representatives district election
Party	Candidate	Votes	%
Republican	John L. Moore (incumbent)	5,932	100.0%
Total votes		5,932	100.0%

=== District 61 ===
2015 Mississippi's 61st House of Representatives district Republican primary election
Party	Candidate	Votes	%
Republican	Ray Rogers (incumbent)	1,900	55.18%
Republican	Randall Stephens	1,543	44.82%
Total votes		3,443	100.0%

2015 Mississippi's 61st House of Representatives district election
Party	Candidate	Votes	%
Republican	Ray Rogers (incumbent)	3,869	100.0%
Total votes		3,869	100.0%

=== District 62 ===
2015 Mississippi's 62nd House of Representatives district Republican primary election
Party	Candidate	Votes	%
Republican	Tom Weathersby (incumbent)	3,173	73.11%
Republican	Wesley Wilson	1,167	26.89%
Total votes		4,340	100.0%

2015 Mississippi's 62nd House of Representatives district election
Party	Candidate	Votes	%
Republican	Tom Weathersby (incumbent)	4,641	79.98%
Democratic	Stephen Wilson	1,162	20.02%
Total votes		5,803	100.0%

=== District 63 ===
2015 Mississippi's 63rd House of Representatives district Democratic primary election
Party	Candidate	Votes	%
Democratic	Deborah Butler Dixon (incumbent)	2,134	52.99%
Democratic	Machelle Shelby Kyles	1,893	47.01%
Total votes		4,027	100.0%

2015 Mississippi's 63rd House of Representatives district election
Party	Candidate	Votes	%
Democratic	Deborah Butler Dixon (incumbent)	5,604	100.0%
Total votes		5,604	100.0%

=== District 64 ===
2015 Mississippi's 64th House of Representatives district Republican primary election
Party	Candidate	Votes	%
Republican	Bill Denny (incumbent)	301	100.0%
Total votes		301	100.0%

2015 Mississippi's 64th House of Representatives district election
Party	Candidate	Votes	%
Republican	Bill Denny (incumbent)	5,695	100.0%
Total votes		5,695	100.0%

=== District 65 ===
2015 Mississippi's 65th House of Representatives district Democratic primary election
Party	Candidate	Votes	%
Democratic	Christopher Bell	1,578	50.27%
Democratic	James Covington	805	25.65%
Democratic	Arqullas Coleman	756	24.08%
Total votes		3,139	100.0%

2015 Mississippi's 65th House of Representatives district election
Party	Candidate	Votes	%
Democratic	Christopher Bell	4,442	100.0%
Total votes		4,442	100.0%

=== District 66 ===
2015 Mississippi's 66th House of Representatives district Democratic primary election
Party	Candidate	Votes	%
Democratic	Jarvis Dortch	2,128	63.37%
Democratic	Brad A. Oberhousen	1,230	36.63%
Total votes		3,358	100.0%

2015 Mississippi's 66th House of Representatives district election
Party	Candidate	Votes	%
Democratic	Jarvis Dortch	5,077	100.0%
Total votes		5,077	100.0%

=== District 67 ===
2015 Mississippi's 67th House of Representatives district election
Party	Candidate	Votes	%
Democratic	Earle S. Banks (incumbent)	4,831	100.0%
Total votes		4,831	100.0%

=== District 68 ===
2015 Mississippi's 68th House of Representatives district Democratic primary election
Party	Candidate	Votes	%
Democratic	Credell Calhoun (incumbent)	1,863	71.19%
Democratic	Kenneth Shearrill	754	28.81%
Total votes		2,617	100.0%

2015 Mississippi's 68th House of Representatives district election
Party	Candidate	Votes	%
Democratic	Credell Calhoun (incumbent)	4,138	100.0%
Total votes		4,138	100.0%

=== District 69 ===
2015 Mississippi's 69th House of Representatives district Democratic primary election
Party	Candidate	Votes	%
Democratic	Alyce Griffin Clarke (incumbent)	1,857	76.64%
Democratic	Plavise Patty Patterson	566	23.36%
Total votes		2,423	100.0%

2015 Mississippi's 69th House of Representatives district election
Party	Candidate	Votes	%
Democratic	Alyce Griffin Clarke (incumbent)	3,455	100.0%
Total votes		3,455	100.0%

=== District 70 ===
2015 Mississippi's 70th House of Representatives district Democratic primary election
Party	Candidate	Votes	%
Democratic	Kathy L. Sykes	1,325	37.89%
Democratic	Samuel Lee Begley	1,207	34.52%
Democratic	Tammy Cotton	965	27.60%
Total votes		3,497	100.0%

2015 Mississippi's 70th House of Representatives district Democratic primary runoff election
Party	Candidate	Votes	%
Democratic	Kathy L. Sykes	1,155	54.28%
Democratic	Samuel Lee Begley	973	45.72%
Total votes		2,128	100.0%

2015 Mississippi's 70th House of Representatives district election
Party	Candidate	Votes	%
Democratic	Kathy L. Sykes	4,286	85.12%
Republican	James Perry	749	14.88%
Total votes		5,035	100.0%

=== District 71 ===
2015 Mississippi's 71st House of Representatives district election
Party	Candidate	Votes	%
Democratic	Adrienne Wooten (incumbent)	4,129	100.0%
Total votes		4,129	100.0%

=== District 72 ===
2015 Mississippi's 72nd House of Representatives district Democratic primary election
Party	Candidate	Votes	%
Democratic	Kimberly L. Campbell (incumbent)	2,646	89.48%
Democratic	Corinthian Sanders	311	10.52%
Total votes		2,957	100.0%

2015 Mississippi's 72nd House of Representatives district election
Party	Candidate	Votes	%
Democratic	Kimberly L. Campbell (incumbent)	4,763	100.0%
Total votes		4,763	100.0%

=== District 73 ===
2015 Mississippi's 73rd House of Representatives district Republican primary election
Party	Candidate	Votes	%
Republican	Cory T. Wilson	5,965	100.0%
Total votes		5,965	100.0%

2015 Mississippi's 73rd House of Representatives district election
Party	Candidate	Votes	%
Republican	Cory T. Wilson	8,224	100.0%
Total votes		8,224	100.0%

=== District 74 ===
2015 Mississippi's 74th House of Representatives district Republican primary election
Party	Candidate	Votes	%
Republican	Mark Baker (incumbent)	5,439	100.0%
Total votes		5,439	100.0%

2015 Mississippi's 74th House of Representatives district election
Party	Candidate	Votes	%
Republican	Mark Baker (incumbent)	6,717	100.0%
Total votes		6,717	100.0%

=== District 75 ===
2015 Mississippi's 75th House of Representatives district Republican primary election
Party	Candidate	Votes	%
Republican	Vance Cox	1,884	100.0%
Total votes		1,884	100.0%

2015 Mississippi's 75th House of Representatives district election
Party	Candidate	Votes	%
Democratic	Tom Miles (incumbent)	3,979	63.66%
Republican	Vance Cox	2,271	36.34%
Total votes		6,250	100.0%

=== District 76 ===
2015 Mississippi's 76th House of Representatives district election
Party	Candidate	Votes	%
Democratic	Gregory Holloway (incumbent)	5,789	100.0%
Total votes		5,789	100.0%

=== District 77 ===
2015 Mississippi's 77th House of Representatives district Republican primary election
Party	Candidate	Votes	%
Republican	Andy Gipson (incumbent)	4,870	100.0%
Total votes		4,870	100.0%

2015 Mississippi's 77th House of Representatives district election
Party	Candidate	Votes	%
Republican	Andy Gipson (incumbent)	5,860	100.0%
Total votes		5,860	100.0%

=== District 78 ===
2015 Mississippi's 78th House of Representatives district Republican primary election
Party	Candidate	Votes	%
Republican	Randy Rushing (incumbent)	2,444	100.0%
Total votes		2,444	100.0%

2015 Mississippi's 78th House of Representatives district election
Party	Candidate	Votes	%
Republican	Randy Rushing (incumbent)	4,572	64.32%
Democratic	Wallace Pogue	2,536	35.68%
Total votes		7,108	100.0%

=== District 79 ===
District 79 is composed of all of Smith County, and a large chunk of Jasper County, incumbent representative Blaine "Bo" Eaton was last elected with 61% of the vote in 2011. In the certified results published after the election, Eaton and Tullos had tied, each receiving 4,589 votes, as such the race went to a tiebreaker in which each candidate would draw a straw and the person who had the longer straw won. Eaton drew the longer straw, and was sworn in; however, the new Republican supermajority, along with Democrat Angela Cockerham, sat Tullos on January 20th after invalidating 5 votes from voters who, they claimed, had not properly notified election officials of their changed addresses within the district.

2015 Mississippi's 79th House of Representatives district Republican primary election
Party	Candidate	Votes	%
Republican	Mark Tullos (incumbent)	1,707	77.31%
Republican	Gary Blakeney	501	22.69%
Total votes		2,208	100.0%

2015 Mississippi's 79th House of Representatives district election
Party	Candidate	Votes	%
Republican	Mark Tullos	4,589	50.0% (Note: 50.03% according to the Mississippi House)
Democratic	Blaine Eaton	4,589	50.0% (Note: 4,584 votes and 49.97% according to the Mississippi House)
Total votes		9,178	100.0%

=== District 80 ===
2015 Mississippi's 80th House of Representatives district election
Party	Candidate	Votes	%
Democratic	Omeria Scott (incumbent)	5,375	100.0%
Total votes		5,375	100.0%

=== District 81 ===
2015 Mississippi's 81st House of Representatives district Republican primary election
Party	Candidate	Votes	%
Republican	Stephen Horne (incumbent)	4,061	100.0%
Total votes		4,061	100.0%

2015 Mississippi's 81st House of Representatives district election
Party	Candidate	Votes	%
Republican	Stephen Horne (incumbent)	5,196	100.0%
Total votes		5,196	100.0%

=== District 82 ===
2015 Mississippi's 82nd House of Representatives district election
Party	Candidate	Votes	%
Democratic	Charles L. Young Sr. (incumbent)	3,203	100.0%
Total votes		3,203	100.0%

=== District 83 ===
2015 Mississippi's 83rd House of Representatives district Republican primary election
Party	Candidate	Votes	%
Republican	Greg Snowden (incumbent)	4,673	100.0%
Total votes		4,673	100.0%

2015 Mississippi's 83rd House of Representatives district election
Party	Candidate	Votes	%
Republican	Greg Snowden (incumbent)	5,363	80.51%
Democratic	William Bond Compton Jr.	1,298	19.49%
Total votes		6,661	100.0%

=== District 84 ===
2015 Mississippi's 84th House of Representatives district Republican primary election
Party	Candidate	Votes	%
Republican	William E. Shirley Jr. (incumbent)	3,042	100.0%
Total votes		3,042	100.0%

2015 Mississippi's 84th House of Representatives district election
Party	Candidate	Votes	%
Republican	William E. Shirley Jr. (incumbent)	7,359	100.0%
Total votes		7,359	100.0%

=== District 85 ===
2015 Mississippi's 85th House of Representatives district Democratic primary election
Party	Candidate	Votes	%
Democratic	Chuck Middleton (incumbent)	3,116	55.50%
Democratic	Maurice Hudson	1,319	23.49%
Democratic	Allen Burks	1,179	21.00%
Total votes		5,514	100.0%

2015 Mississippi's 85th House of Representatives district election
Party	Candidate	Votes	%
Democratic	Chuck Middleton (incumbent)	7,011	100.0%
Total votes		7,011	100.0%

=== District 86 ===
2015 Mississippi's 86th House of Representatives district Republican primary election
Party	Candidate	Votes	%
Republican	Shane Barnett	1,034	100.0%
Total votes		1,034	100.0%

2015 Mississippi's 86th House of Representatives district election
Party	Candidate	Votes	%
Republican	Shane Barnett	4,147	54.27%
Democratic	Sherra Hillman Lane (incumbent)	3,495	45.73%
Total votes		7,642	100.0%

=== District 87 ===
2015 Mississippi's 87th House of Representatives district Republican primary election
Party	Candidate	Votes	%
Republican	Chris Johnson	2,021	49.18%
Republican	Michael D. Davis	1,379	33.56%
Republican	Andy Mozingo	709	17.25%
Total votes		4,109	100.0%

2015 Mississippi's 87th House of Representatives district Republican primary runoff election
Party	Candidate	Votes	%
Republican	Chris Johnson	1,980	59.32%
Republican	Michael D. Davis	1,358	40.68%
Total votes		3,338	100.0%

2015 Mississippi's 87th House of Representatives district election
Party	Candidate	Votes	%
Republican	Chris Johnson	4,458	80.24%
Independent	Paul B. Johnson IV	1,098	19.76%
Total votes		5,557	100.0%

=== District 88 ===
2015 Mississippi's 88th House of Representatives district Republican primary election
Party	Candidate	Votes	%
Republican	Gary Staples (incumbent)	3,255	50.91%
Republican	Christopher S. Hodge	2,591	40.52%
Republican	Mitchell Pitts	548	8.57%
Total votes		6,394	100.0%

2015 Mississippi's 88th House of Representatives district election
Party	Candidate	Votes	%
Republican	Gary Staples (incumbent)	7,478	100.0%
Total votes		7,478	100.0%

=== District 89 ===
2015 Mississippi's 89th House of Representatives district Republican primary election
Party	Candidate	Votes	%
Republican	Bobby Shows (incumbent)	5,666	100.0%
Total votes		5,666	100.0%

2015 Mississippi's 89th House of Representatives district election
Party	Candidate	Votes	%
Republican	Bobby Shows (incumbent)	6,309	100.0%
Total votes		6,309	100.0%

=== District 90 ===
2015 Mississippi's 90th House of Representatives district Republican primary election
Party	Candidate	Votes	%
Republican	Noah L. Sanford	1,662	64.07%
Republican	Rick Ward	932	35.93%
Total votes		2,594	100.0%

2015 Mississippi's 90th House of Representatives district election
Party	Candidate	Votes	%
Republican	Noah L. Sanford	4,177	54.14%
Democratic	John B. Pope III	3,538	45.86%
Total votes		7,715	100.0%

=== District 91 ===
2015 Mississippi's 91st House of Representatives district Republican primary election
Party	Candidate	Votes	%
Republican	Charles E. Bufkin	1,052	100.0%
Total votes		1,052	100.0%

2015 Mississippi's 91st House of Representatives district election
Party	Candidate	Votes	%
Democratic	Bob Evans (incumbent)	5,478	64.21%
Republican	Charles E. Bufkin	3,053	35.79%
Total votes		8,531	100.0%

=== District 92 ===
2015 Mississippi's 92nd House of Representatives district Republican primary election
Party	Candidate	Votes	%
Republican	Becky Currie (incumbent)	3,926	100.0%
Total votes		3,926	100.0%

2015 Mississippi's 92nd House of Representatives district election
Party	Candidate	Votes	%
Republican	Becky Currie (incumbent)	6,964	100.0%
Total votes		6,964	100.0%

=== District 93 ===
2015 Mississippi's 93rd House of Representatives district Republican primary election
Party	Candidate	Votes	%
Republican	Timmy Ladner (incumbent)	3,543	100.0%
Total votes		3,543	100.0%

2015 Mississippi's 93rd House of Representatives district election
Party	Candidate	Votes	%
Republican	Timmy Ladner (incumbent)	3,307	67.64%
Democratic	Billy Joe Ladner	1,582	32.36%
Total votes		4,889	100.0%

=== District 94 ===
2015 Mississippi's 94th House of Representatives district election
Party	Candidate	Votes	%
Democratic	Robert L. Johnson, III (incumbent)	4,990	100.0%
Total votes		4,990	100.0%

=== District 95 ===
2015 Mississippi's 95th House of Representatives district Republican primary election
Party	Candidate	Votes	%
Republican	Patricia H. Willis (incumbent)	3,936	100.0%
Total votes		3,936	100.0%

2015 Mississippi's 95th House of Representatives district election
Party	Candidate	Votes	%
Republican	Patricia H. Willis (incumbent)	4,351	100.0%
Total votes		4,351	100.0%

=== District 96 ===
2015 Mississippi's 96th House of Representatives district election
Party	Candidate	Votes	%
Democratic	Angela Cockerham (incumbent)	7,548	100.0%
Total votes		7,548	100.0%

=== District 97 ===
2015 Mississippi's 97th House of Representatives district Republican primary election
Party	Candidate	Votes	%
Republican	Sam C. Mims, V (incumbent)	2,899	100.0%
Total votes		2,899	100.0%

2015 Mississippi's 97th House of Representatives district election
Party	Candidate	Votes	%
Republican	Sam C. Mims, V (incumbent)	5,484	68.39%
Democratic	Kitty Sasser	2,535	31.61%
Total votes		8,019	100.0%

=== District 98 ===
2015 Mississippi's 98th House of Representatives district Democratic primary election
Party	Candidate	Votes	%
Democratic	David W. Myers (incumbent)	1,743	53.01%
Democratic	Tasha Dillon	1,545	46.99%
Total votes		3,288	100.0%

2015 Mississippi's 98th House of Representatives district election
Party	Candidate	Votes	%
Democratic	David W. Myers (incumbent)	5,814	100.0%
Total votes		5,814	100.0%

=== District 99 ===
2015 Mississippi's 99th House of Representatives district Republican primary election
Party	Candidate	Votes	%
Republican	Bill Pigott (incumbent)	2,257	100.0%
Total votes		2,257	100.0%

2015 Mississippi's 99th House of Representatives district election
Party	Candidate	Votes	%
Republican	Bill Pigott (incumbent)	6,423	100.0%
Total votes		6,423	100.0%

=== District 100 ===
2015 Mississippi's 100th House of Representatives district Republican primary election
Party	Candidate	Votes	%
Republican	Ken Morgan (incumbent)	3,799	83.90%
Republican	Harry Griffith	729	16.10%
Total votes		4,528	100.0%

2015 Mississippi's 100th House of Representatives district election
Party	Candidate	Votes	%
Republican	Ken Morgan (incumbent)	6,005	100.0%
Total votes		6,005	100.0%

=== District 101 ===
2015 Mississippi's 101st House of Representatives district Republican primary election
Party	Candidate	Votes	%
Republican	Brad Touchstone	5,085	100.0%
Total votes		5,085	100.0%

2015 Mississippi's 101st House of Representatives district election
Party	Candidate	Votes	%
Republican	Brad Touchstone	6,270	100.0%
Total votes		6,270	100.0%

=== District 102 ===
2015 Mississippi's 102nd House of Representatives district Republican primary election
Party	Candidate	Votes	%
Republican	Toby Barker (incumbent)	2,446	87.80%
Republican	Ric McCluskey	340	12.20%
Total votes		2,786	100.0%

2015 Mississippi's 102nd House of Representatives district election
Party	Candidate	Votes	%
Republican	Toby Barker (incumbent)	3,502	72.78%
Democratic	Taylor R. Brinkley	1,310	27.22%
Total votes		4,812	100.0%

=== District 103 ===
2015 Mississippi's 103rd House of Representatives district election
Party	Candidate	Votes	%
Democratic	Percy W. Watson (incumbent)	4,043	100.0%
Total votes		4,043	100.0%

=== District 104 ===
2015 Mississippi's 104th House of Representatives district Republican primary election
Party	Candidate	Votes	%
Republican	Larry Byrd (incumbent)	3,505	100.0%
Total votes		3,505	100.0%

2015 Mississippi's 104th House of Representatives district election
Party	Candidate	Votes	%
Republican	Larry Byrd (incumbent)	5,580	100.0%
Total votes		5,580	100.0%

=== District 105 ===
2015 Mississippi's 105th House of Representatives district Republican primary election
Party	Candidate	Votes	%
Republican	Roun McNeal	2,676	100.0%
Total votes		2,676	100.0%

2015 Mississippi's 105th House of Representatives district election
Party	Candidate	Votes	%
Republican	Roun McNeal	4,207	56.74%
Democratic	Dennis Cochran	3,208	43.26%
Total votes		7,415	100.0%

=== District 106 ===
2015 Mississippi's 106th House of Representatives district Republican primary election
Party	Candidate	Votes	%
Republican	Herb Frierson (incumbent)	4,451	100.0%
Total votes		4,451	100.0%

2015 Mississippi's 106th House of Representatives district election
Party	Candidate	Votes	%
Republican	Herb Frierson (incumbent)	4,011	100.0%
Total votes		4,011	100.0%

=== District 107 ===
2015 Mississippi's 107th House of Representatives district Republican primary election
Party	Candidate	Votes	%
Republican	Doug McLeod (incumbent)	3,772	100.0%
Total votes		3,772	100.0%

2015 Mississippi's 107th House of Representatives district election
Party	Candidate	Votes	%
Republican	Doug McLeod (incumbent)	5,197	76.75%
Democratic	Austin Howell	1,574	23.25%
Total votes		6,771	100.0%

=== District 108 ===
2015 Mississippi's 108th House of Representatives district Republican primary election
Party	Candidate	Votes	%
Republican	Mark S. Formby (incumbent)	3,646	100.0%
Total votes		3,646	100.0%

2015 Mississippi's 108th House of Representatives district election
Party	Candidate	Votes	%
Republican	Mark S. Formby (incumbent)	3,198	77.04%
Democratic	Leavern Guy	953	22.96%
Total votes		4,151	100.0%

=== District 109 ===
2015 Mississippi's 109th House of Representatives district Republican primary election
Party	Candidate	Votes	%
Republican	Manly Barton (incumbent)	4,529	100.0%
Total votes		4,529	100.0%

2015 Mississippi's 109th House of Representatives district election
Party	Candidate	Votes	%
Republican	Manly Barton (incumbent)	4,281	87.71%
Libertarian	Joshua Hardy	600	12.29%
Total votes		4,881	100.0%

=== District 110 ===
2015 Mississippi's 110th House of Representatives district Democratic primary election
Party	Candidate	Votes	%
Democratic	Jeramey D. Anderson (incumbent)	1,733	80.05%
Democratic	Mitch Ellerby	432	19.95%
Total votes		2,165	100.0%

2015 Mississippi's 110th House of Representatives district election
Party	Candidate	Votes	%
Democratic	Jeramey D. Anderson (incumbent)	3,778	100.0%
Total votes		3,778	100.0%

=== District 111 ===
2015 Mississippi's 111th House of Representatives district Republican primary election
Party	Candidate	Votes	%
Republican	Charles Busby (incumbent)	4,000	100.0%
Total votes		4,000	100.0%

2015 Mississippi's 111th House of Representatives district election
Party	Candidate	Votes	%
Republican	Charles Busby (incumbent)	3,771	76.96%
Democratic	Kay Sims	1,129	23.04%
Total votes		4,900	100.0%

=== District 112 ===
2015 Mississippi's 112th House of Representatives district Republican primary election
Party	Candidate	Votes	%
Republican	John Read (incumbent)	1,783	60.61%
Republican	Amanda Magee	1,159	39.39%
Total votes		2,942	100.0%

2015 Mississippi's 112th House of Representatives district election
Party	Candidate	Votes	%
Republican	John Read (incumbent)	3,392	100.0%
Total votes		3,392	100.0%

=== District 113 ===
2015 Mississippi's 113th House of Representatives district Republican primary election
Party	Candidate	Votes	%
Republican	Hank Zuber (incumbent)	2,854	100.0%
Total votes		2,854	100.0%

2015 Mississippi's 113th House of Representatives district election
Party	Candidate	Votes	%
Republican	Hank Zuber (incumbent)	3,950	100.0%
Total votes		3,950	100.0%

=== District 114 ===
2015 Mississippi's 114th House of Representatives district Republican primary election
Party	Candidate	Votes	%
Republican	Jeffrey Guice (incumbent)	1,893	72.50%
Republican	Barney W. O'Neal	718	27.50%
Total votes		2,611	100.0%

2015 Mississippi's 114th House of Representatives district election
Party	Candidate	Votes	%
Republican	Jeffrey Guice (incumbent)	3,314	100.0%
Total votes		3,314	100.0%

=== District 115 ===
2015 Mississippi's 115th House of Representatives district Republican primary election
Party	Candidate	Votes	%
Republican	Randall Patterson (incumbent)	1,357	100.0%
Total votes		1,357	100.0%

2015 Mississippi's 115th House of Representatives district election
Party	Candidate	Votes	%
Republican	Randall Patterson (incumbent)	1,860	100.0%
Total votes		1,860	100.0%

=== District 116 ===
2015 Mississippi's 116th House of Representatives district Republican primary election
Party	Candidate	Votes	%
Republican	Casey Eure (incumbent)	3,092	100.0%
Total votes		3,092	100.0%

2015 Mississippi's 116th House of Representatives district election
Party	Candidate	Votes	%
Republican	Casey Eure (incumbent)	3,781	100.0%
Total votes		3,781	100.0%

=== District 117 ===
2015 Mississippi's 117th House of Representatives district Republican primary election
Party	Candidate	Votes	%
Republican	Scott DeLano (incumbent)	2,375	100.0%
Total votes		2,375	100.0%

2015 Mississippi's 117th House of Representatives district election
Party	Candidate	Votes	%
Republican	Scott DeLano (incumbent)	3,372	100.0%
Total votes		3,372	100.0%

=== District 118 ===
2015 Mississippi's 118th House of Representatives district Republican primary election
Party	Candidate	Votes	%
Republican	Greg Haney (incumbent)	2,482	64.82%
Republican	John McCay III	1,347	35.18%
Total votes		3,829	100.0%

2015 Mississippi's 118th House of Representatives district election
Party	Candidate	Votes	%
Republican	Greg Haney (incumbent)	4,051	100.0%
Total votes		4,051	100.0%

=== District 119 ===
2015 Mississippi's 119th House of Representatives district election
Party	Candidate	Votes	%
Democratic	Sonya Williams-Barnes (incumbent)	2,982	100.0%
Total votes		2,982	100.0%

=== District 120 ===
2015 Mississippi's 120th House of Representatives district Republican primary election
Party	Candidate	Votes	%
Republican	Richard Bennett (incumbent)	2,955	100.0%
Total votes		2,955	100.0%

2015 Mississippi's 120th House of Representatives district election
Party	Candidate	Votes	%
Republican	Richard Bennett (incumbent)	3,999	100.0%
Total votes		3,999	100.0%

=== District 121 ===
2015 Mississippi's 121st House of Representatives district Republican primary election
Party	Candidate	Votes	%
Republican	Carolyn Crawford (incumbent)	1,910	56.18%
Republican	Jeff Wallace	1,490	43.82%
Total votes		3,400	100.0%

2015 Mississippi's 121st House of Representatives district Democratic primary election
Party	Candidate	Votes	%
Democratic	Brian Pearse	327	50.08%
Democratic	Hunter Dawkins	326	49.92%
Total votes		653	100.0%

2015 Mississippi's 121st House of Representatives district election
Party	Candidate	Votes	%
Republican	Carolyn Crawford (incumbent)	3,279	66.86%
Democratic	Brian Pearse	1,625	33.14%
Total votes		4,904	100.0%

=== District 122 ===
2015 Mississippi's 122nd House of Representatives district Republican primary election
Party	Candidate	Votes	%
Republican	Mickey Lagasse	2,641	100.0%
Total votes		2,641	100.0%

2015 Mississippi's 122nd House of Representatives district election
Party	Candidate	Votes	%
Democratic	David Baria (incumbent)	2,369	51.08%
Republican	Mickey Lagasse	2,269	48.92%
Total votes		4,638	100.0%

== See also ==
- 2015 Mississippi elections
- 2015 Mississippi Senate election
- 2015 Mississippi gubernatorial election
