= 2025 Gulfport mayoral election =

Election in Mississippi, US

- June 3, 2025
- Turnout: 24.6%
Nominee	Hugh Keating	Sonya Williams-Barnes
Party	Republican	Democratic
Popular vote	6,902	6,073
Percentage	53.2%	46.8%
Mayor before election
Billy Hewes
Republican
Mayor
Hugh Keating
Republican

The 2025 Gulfport mayoral election was held on June 3, 2025, to elect the mayor of Gulfport, Mississippi. Incumbent mayor Billy Hewes was eligible for re-election to a second four-year term, but announced that he would retire.

Primary elections were held on April 1, 2025. Former Democratic member of the Mississippi House of Representatives Sonya Williams-Barnes won her party's primary, defeating former professional basketball player Ronnie Henderson, and Republican attorney Hugh Keating won his party's nomination unopposed. In the general election, Keating defeated Barnes by a margin of 6.4%, and the race has become more competitive.

Although Barnes lost the election, she praised the city for having its highest voter turnout in history, with over 13,000 citizens voting.

== Republican primary ==
=== Candidates ===
==== Nominee ====
- Hugh Keating, attorney

==== Declined ====
- Billy Hewes, incumbent mayor

=== Results ===
Republican primary results
Party	Candidate	Votes	%
Republican	Hugh Keating	Unopposed	
Total votes			

== Democratic primary ==
=== Candidates ===
==== Nominee ====
- Sonya Williams-Barnes, state representative from 119th district (2012–2022)

==== Eliminated in primary ====
- Ronnie Henderson, former basketball player for Washington Wizards (1996–2006)

=== Endorsements ===
Sonya Williams-Barnes

Organizations

- Southern Poverty Law Center Action Fund

=== Results ===
Democratic primary results
Party	Candidate	Votes	%
Democratic	Sonya Williams-Barnes	3,280	84.3
Democratic	Ronnie Henderson	612	15.7
Total votes		3,892	100.00

== General election ==
=== Allegations of voter fraud ===
The Mississippi Republican Party accused Sonya Williams-Barnes of voter fraud and vote buying, led by its chair D. Michael Hurst Jr., who has proof to back up its claims that she and her campaign violated campaign finance laws. Being outraged, the Mississippi Republicans claimed that Stacey Abrams (Note: Stacey Abrams was a native from Gulfport, Mississippi.) was helping her win the election because she was an outsider from Georgia. They knew that Williams-Barnes would be violating election laws, considering it has one of the strictest laws ever in Mississippi. Mississippi Attorney General Lynn Fitch and her office opened an investigation into her campaign's alleged violations. The Mississippi Democratic Party chair Cheikh Taylor slammed the investigation as a "false and desperate attack from a failing campaign." The Williams-Barnes campaign denied the accusations and responded that the press conference by the GOP “was nothing more than a scare tactic by [her opponent's] party to rally last-minute support, and a desperate attempt to distract from their lack of vision for our city.” Rev. Eddie Hartwell Sr., a pastor at St. James Baptist Church, said the voucher idea was his. His group behind it, called All Souls to the Polls, and its members say they want to increase voter turnout. Hartwell denied being involved in either campaign or that the efforts were illegal. Outraged after the GOP's accusations, the Mississippi Democrats called for an investigation into one of Island View Casino's owners, Rick Carter, for what they called "voter intimidation."

=== Endorsements ===
Sonya Williams-Barnes

U.S. representatives

- Bennie Thompson, MS-2 (1993–present)

State senators

- David Blount, state senator from the 29th district (2008–present)
- Rod Hickman, state senator from the 32nd district (2008–present)

State representatives

- Stacey Abrams, founder of Fair Fight Action, Georgia state representative from the 89th district (2007–2017), minority leader (2011–2017), 2018 and 2022 nominee for governor of Georgia
- Otis Anthony, state representative from the 31st district (2018–present)
- Jeramey Anderson, state representative from the 110th district (2014–present)
- Willie Bailey, state representative from the 49th district (1995–present)
- Bryant Clark, state representative from the 47th district (2004–present)
- Oscar Denton, state representative from the 55th district (2004–present)
- Justis Gibbs, state representative from the 72nd district (2024–present)
- Jeffery Harness, state representative from the 85th district (2018–present)
- John Hines, state representative from the 50th district (2004–present)
- Jeffrey Hulum III, state representative from the 119th district (2022–present)
- Lataisha Jackson, state representative from the 11th district (2013–present)
- Robert Johnson III, state representative from the 94th district (2004–present)
- Kabir Karriem, state representative from the 41st district (2016–present)
- Fabian Nelson, state representative from the 66th district (2024–present)
- Daryl Porter Jr., state representative from the 98th district (2020–present)
- Omeria Scott, state representative from the 80th district (1993–present)
- Zakiya Summers, state representative from the 68th district (2020–present)
- Cheikh Taylor, state representative from the 68th district (2018–present), chair of the Mississippi Democratic Party (2023–present)
- Percy Willis Watson, state representative from the 103rd district (1980–present)

Local officials

- Kent Jones, Harrison County Supervisor from the 4th district

Organizations

- Mississippi Democratic Party
- Harrison County Democrats

Labor unions

- AFL-CIO
- International Brotherhood of Electrical Workers
Hugh Keating

U.S. senators

- Cindy Hyde-Smith, U.S. senator from Mississippi (2018–present)
- Tim Scott, U.S. senator from South Carolina (2013–present)

U.S. representatives

- Mike Ezell, U.S. Representative from MS-4 (2023–present)

Statewide officials

- Haley Barbour, Governor of Mississippi (2004–2012)
- Wayne Carr, Public Services Commissioner from Southern district (2024–present)
- Andy Gipson, Agriculture and Commerce Commissioner of Mississippi (2018–present)

State senators

- Joel Carter, state senator from the 49th district (2018–present)
- Scott DeLano, state senator from the 50th district (2020–present)
- Jeremy England, state senator from the 51st district (2020–present)
- Philman Ladner, state senator from the 46th district (2024–present)
- Mike Thompson, state senator from the 48th district (2020–present)
- Brice Wiggins, state senator from the 52nd district (2012–present)

State representatives

- Brent Anderson, state representative from the 122nd district (2020–present)
- Manly Barton, state representative from the 109th district (2012–present)
- Richard Bennett, state representative from the 113th district (2008–present)
- Carolyn Crawford, state representative from the 121st district (2012–present)
- Jim Estrada, state representative from the 107th district (2024–present)
- Casey Eure, state representative from the 116th district (2011–present)
- Kevin Felsher, state representative from the 117th district (2020–present)
- Jimmy Fondren, state representative from the 111th district (2020–present)
- Zachary Grady, state representative from the 115th district (2024–present)
- Greg Haney, state representative from the 118th district (2012–present)
- Timmy Ladner, state representative from the 93rd district (2012–present)
- Steve Lott, state representative from the 95th district (2024–present)
- Jay McKnight, state representative from the 95th district (2020–present)
- John Read, state representative from the 112th district (1993–present)
- Henry Zuber III, state representative from the 113th district (2000–present)

Local officials

- Nathan Barrett, Harrison County Supervisor from the 5th district
- Dan Cuevas, Harrison County Supervisor from the 1st district
- Billy Hewes, mayor of Gulfport (2013-present)
- Robert Lee Flowers, Gulfport councilman from Ward 6
- Ron Roland, Gulfport councilman from Ward 2

State party officials

- D. Michael Hurst Jr., Chair of the Mississippi Republican Party (2024–present) and U.S. Attorney for the Southern District of Mississippi (2017–2021)

Organizations

- Mississippi Republican Party

=== Results ===
2025 Gulfport mayoral election results
Party	Candidate	Votes	%
Republican	Hugh Keating	6,902	53.2%
Democratic	Sonya Williams-Barnes	6,073	46.8%
Total votes		12,975	100.00%
Republican hold			
