= Credell Calhoun =

American politician and businessman

Member of the Mississippi House of Representatives from the 68th district
- In office January 5, 2004 – January 7, 2020
- Preceded by: Tom Wallace
- Succeeded by: Zakiya Summers
- In office 1980–1992
- Preceded by: District Reapportioned
- Succeeded by: Earle S. Banks

Personal details
- Born: May 20, 1943 (age 83) Natchitoches, Louisiana, U.S.
- Party: Democratic
- Education: Prairie View A&M University, (BA, MA); Northwestern State University. (MBA); Jackson State University, (EdS)

Credell Calhoun (born May 20, 1943) is an American businessman and Democratic Party politician who served in the Mississippi House of Representatives, representing the 68th District from 1980 to 1992 and 2004 to 2020. Calhoun decided not to run for reelection in 2019 to run for a position on the Hinds County Board of Supervisors. He lost re-election to the board in a 2023 primary.

== Early life ==
The son of a sharecropper, Calhoun was born in Natchitoches, Louisiana on May 20, 1943. He graduated from Fremont High School in Los Angeles. He graduated with a bachelor of science and master's degree from Prairie View A&M and continued his education at Jackson State University. He studied business administration, economics, and counseling.

After graduating, he worked in the Mayor Dale Dank's office in Jackson as an administrative assistant, and he worked in the governor's office as an auditor. He has worked as a counselor for Jackson State University.

== Political career ==
A Democrat, Calhoun was elected to the Mississippi House of Representatives, serving non-contiguous terms from 1980 to 1992 and 2004 to 2020 for the 68th district. He retired from the Mississippi State House to run for election to the Hinds County Board of Supervisors. He was elected and served until 2024, losing a primary election in 2023 to Deborah Butler Dixon.

=== Elections ===
Calhoun's initial campaign in 1979 followed redistricting that increased the number of Blacks in the 68th district; he focused his campaign's priorities on services for the elderly and increasing employment opportunities.

In 1992, he expressed interest in running for mayor of Jackson, Mississippi, aiming to become the first Black mayor. At the same time, he ran for re-election to his legislative seat, which was now the 67th district. He narrowly lost in the primary election in August against Earle S. Banks, with observers placing the reason on the ill-timed mayoral race and the negative campaigning Calhoun engaged in. He proceeded to lose in a convention vote to former state senator Henry Kirksey in late August to pick a Black consensus candidate for the mayoral post.

In 1993, he ran for office to the Jackson City Council, being elected to Ward 4; he was elected president of the council in 1995. He was ousted in his 1997 campaign by Bo Brown, winning only around 26% of the vote.

In 1999, he ran for a seat on the Mississippi Transportation Commission in the central district upon the nomination and confirmation of Commissioner Wayne Burkes to the U.S. Surface Transportation Board. He lost in the Democratic primary to Willie Richardson, a former Baltimore Colts wide receiver.

In 2001, he ran for election to once again represent Ward 4 on the Jackson City Council against Councilman Bo Brown; he narrowly lost in the run-off.

In 2003, he ran for election to his old seat in the Mississippi House of Representatives against Rep. Tom Wallace. He defeated Wallace in the primary and Republican David Harrington in the general.

== Personal life ==
He is married to Peggy Hobson, a former Hinds County supervisor, and is a Missionary Baptist. He has been a member of the Elks Lodge, Freemasons, and Kappa Alpha Psi; he has served on the Mississippi Boy Scouts council. He has also been affiliated with the NAACP and AARP.
