= Justin Keen =

Justin Keen may refer to:

- Justin Keen (racing driver)
- Justin Keen (politician)
