= Patricia H. Willis =

Mississippi politician

Member of the Mississippi House of Representatives from the 95th district
- In office June 10, 2013 – January 7, 2020
- Preceded by: Jessica Upshaw
- Succeeded by: Jay McKnight

Personal details
- Born: 1952 or 1953 (age 73–74)
- Party: Republican

Patricia H. Willis (born 1952 or 1953) is an American politician who served as a member of the Mississippi House of Representatives from the 95th district from 2013 to 2020. A Republican, she was first elected in a 2013 special election, reelected in 2015, and lost renomination in 2019. Her district covered parts of Harrison and Hancock counties.

== Political career ==
On March 24, 2013, 95th district state representative Jessica Upshaw was found dead of an apparent gunshot suicide. A special election was scheduled for May 28, 2013, to fill the seat for the remainder of Upshaw's term. The district contains parts of Harrison and Hancock counties. Willis ran in the special election, facing three other candidates: Tommy Ballard, Sherri Carr Bevis, and Grant Bower. State legislative elections in Mississippi are officially nonpartisan, with a runoff election held if neither candidate receives a majority of the vote. Willis won the special election with around 52% of the vote, avoiding the need for a runoff. Willis was sworn in on June 10.

Willis ran as a Republican in the 2015 Mississippi House of Representatives election, winning reelection unopposed.

In the 2019 Mississippi House of Representatives election, Willis was challenged in the Republican primary by three other candidates: Jay McKnight, Nancy Depreo, and Robert Dambrino. In the primary, held on August 6, she was forced into a runoff against McKnight, receiving only about 29% of the primary vote. She lost the August 27 runoff, receiving about 41% of the vote.

== Personal life ==
As of 2013, Willis resided in Diamondhead, Mississippi. She is an attorney and served as a prosecutor for the city of Waveland.

== Electoral history ==
2013 Mississippi's 95th House of Representatives district special election
Party	Candidate	Votes	%
Nonpartisan	Patricia H. Willis	1,014	52.48
Nonpartisan	Sherri Carr Bevis	740	38.30
Nonpartisan	Grant Bower	114	5.90
Nonpartisan	Tommy Ballard	64	3.31
Total votes		1,932	100.0
Republican hold			

2015 Mississippi's 95th House of Representatives district Republican primary election
Party	Candidate	Votes	%
Republican	Patricia H. Willis (incumbent)	3,936	100.0
Total votes		3,936	100.0

2015 Mississippi's 95th House of Representatives district election
Party	Candidate	Votes	%
Republican	Patricia H. Willis (incumbent)	4,351	100.0
Total votes		4,351	100.0

2019 Mississippi's 95th House of Representatives district Republican primary election
Party	Candidate	Votes	%
Republican	Jay McKnight	2,218	39.90
Republican	Patricia H. Willis (incumbent)	1,633	29.38
Republican	Nancy Depreo	1,209	21.75
Republican	Robert Dambrino	8.98	100.0
Total votes		5,559	100.0

2019 Mississippi's 95th House of Representatives district Republican primary election
Party	Candidate	Votes	%
Republican	Jay McKnight	2,791	59.32
Republican	Patricia H. Willis (incumbent)	1,914	40.68
Total votes		4,705	100.0
