= Kimberly Remak =

American politician

Member of the Mississippi House of Representatives from the 7th district
- Incumbent
- Assumed office January 2024
- Preceded by: Steve Hopkins

Personal details
- Party: Republican
- Spouse: Geza Remak

Kimberly Remak is an American politician from Mississippi who was elected to represent the 7th District in the Mississippi House of Representatives in the 2023 Mississippi House of Representatives election. She is a Republican.

Remak announced her candidacy in early 2023. She defeated James Goodkind in the Republican primary that August after earning 50.1 percent of the vote. Remak went on to defeat Democrat Gail Baptist Lyons in the general election.

Remak previously ran in the same district in 2019, receiving an endorsement from Governor Phil Bryant. She was defeated by Steve Hopkins in the Republican primary.

== Personal life ==
Remak is a Christian and a seventh-generation resident of Mississippi. She is married to Geza Remak.
