= Jessica Upshaw =

American politician

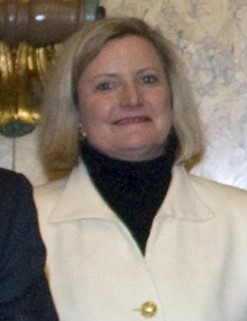
- Upshaw in 2010

Member of the Mississippi House of Representatives from the 95th district
- In office 2004–2013
- Succeeded by: Patricia H. Willis

Personal details
- Born: August 31, 1959 Meridian, Mississippi, U.S.
- Died: March 24, 2013 (aged 53) Mendenhall, Mississippi, U.S.
- Party: Republican

Jessica Sibley Upshaw (August 31, 1959 – March 24, 2013) was an American politician and lawyer.

Born in Meridian, Mississippi, Upshaw received her bachelor's and law degrees from the University of Mississippi and practiced law. She served in the Mississippi House of Representatives, from Diamondhead, Mississippi, as a Republican from 2004 to 2013. Upshaw was found dead in the home of former Mississippi State Representative Clint Rotenberry in Mendenhall, Mississippi on March 24, 2013. Police investigated her death, an apparent gunshot suicide.
