= Beth Luther Waldo =

American politician

Member of the Mississippi House of Representatives from the 15th district
- Incumbent
- Assumed office January 2, 2024

Personal details
- Party: Republican

Beth Luther Waldo is a Republican member of the Mississippi House of Representatives, representing the Fifteenth District of Mississippi since 2024.
