= Doc Harris =

American politician

Member of the Mississippi House of Representatives from the 28th district
- Incumbent
- Assumed office January 2, 2024
- Preceded by: Jerry Darnell

Personal details
- Born: September 12, 1947 (age 78) Hernando, Mississippi, U.S.
- Party: Republican
- Occupation: Politician
- Profession: Telecommunications

W. I. "Doc" Harris serves as a member of the Mississippi House of Representatives for the 28th District, affiliating with the Republican Party, a position he has held since 2024.

He graduated from Hernando High School, Northwest Community College, and Mississippi State University.

He is a Methodist.
