= Jerry Darnell =

American politician

Member of the Mississippi House of Representatives from the 28th district
- In office January 2020 – January 2, 2024
- Preceded by: Robert Foster
- Succeeded by: Doc Harris

Personal details
- Born: November 27, 1962 (age 63) Memphis, Tennessee, U.S.
- Party: Republican

Jerry Darnell (born November 27, 1962) is an American retired educator and Republican politician. He is a former member of the Mississippi House of Representatives, serving from 2020 to 2024.

== Biography ==
Jerry Darnell was born on November 27, 1962, in Memphis, Tennessee. He graduated from Coldwater High School. He received a B. A. in elementary education and a master's degree in educational leadership from the University of Mississippi. In 2020, he was elected to represent the 28th district in the Mississippi House of Representatives.
