= Kathy L. Sykes =

American politician (born 1963)

Member of the Mississippi House of Representatives from the 70th district
- In office 2016–2020
- Succeeded by: Bo Brown

Personal details
- Born: June 29, 1963 (age 63) Jackson, Mississippi, U.S.
- Party: Democratic

Kathy L. Sykes (born June 29, 1963) is an American politician who served as a member of the Mississippi House of Representatives for the 42nd district from 2016 to 2020. She is a member of the Democratic party.
