= Charles Blackwell (politician) =

American politician (born 1962)

Member of the Mississippi House of Representatives from the 88th district
- Incumbent
- Assumed office January 2, 2024
- Preceded by: Robin Robinson

Personal details
- Born: November 21, 1962 (age 63) Oxford, Mississippi
- Party: Republican
- Spouse: Dianne Craft
- Education: University of South Alabama, University of Southern Mississippi, Mississippi College School of Law
- Occupation: Politician
- Profession: Attorney

Charles Blackwell (born November 21, 1962) is an American politician who serves as a member of the Mississippi House of Representatives for the 88th District, affiliating with the Republican Party, a position he has held since 2024.
