= Dana Criswell =

American politician

Member of the Mississippi House of Representatives from the 6th district
- In office January 5, 2016 – January 2, 2024
- Preceded by: Eugene Hamilton
- Succeeded by: Justin Keen

Personal details
- Born: October 9, 1963 (age 62) Pascagoula, Mississippi, U.S.
- Party: Republican

Dana Criswell (born October 9, 1963) is an American politician who formerly served in the Mississippi House of Representatives from the 6th district from 2016 to 2024.
