= Rufus Straughter =

American politician

Member of the Mississippi House of Representatives from the 51st district
- In office 1996 – January 2, 2024
- Succeeded by: Timaka James-Jones

Personal details
- Born: May 4, 1937 (age 89) Humphreys County, Mississippi, U.S.
- Party: Democratic

Rufus E. (Pete) Straughter (born May 4, 1937) is an American politician. He is a former member of the Mississippi House of Representatives from the 51st District, being first elected in 1994 and serving till 2024. He is a member of the Democratic party.
