= Vince Mangold =

American politician

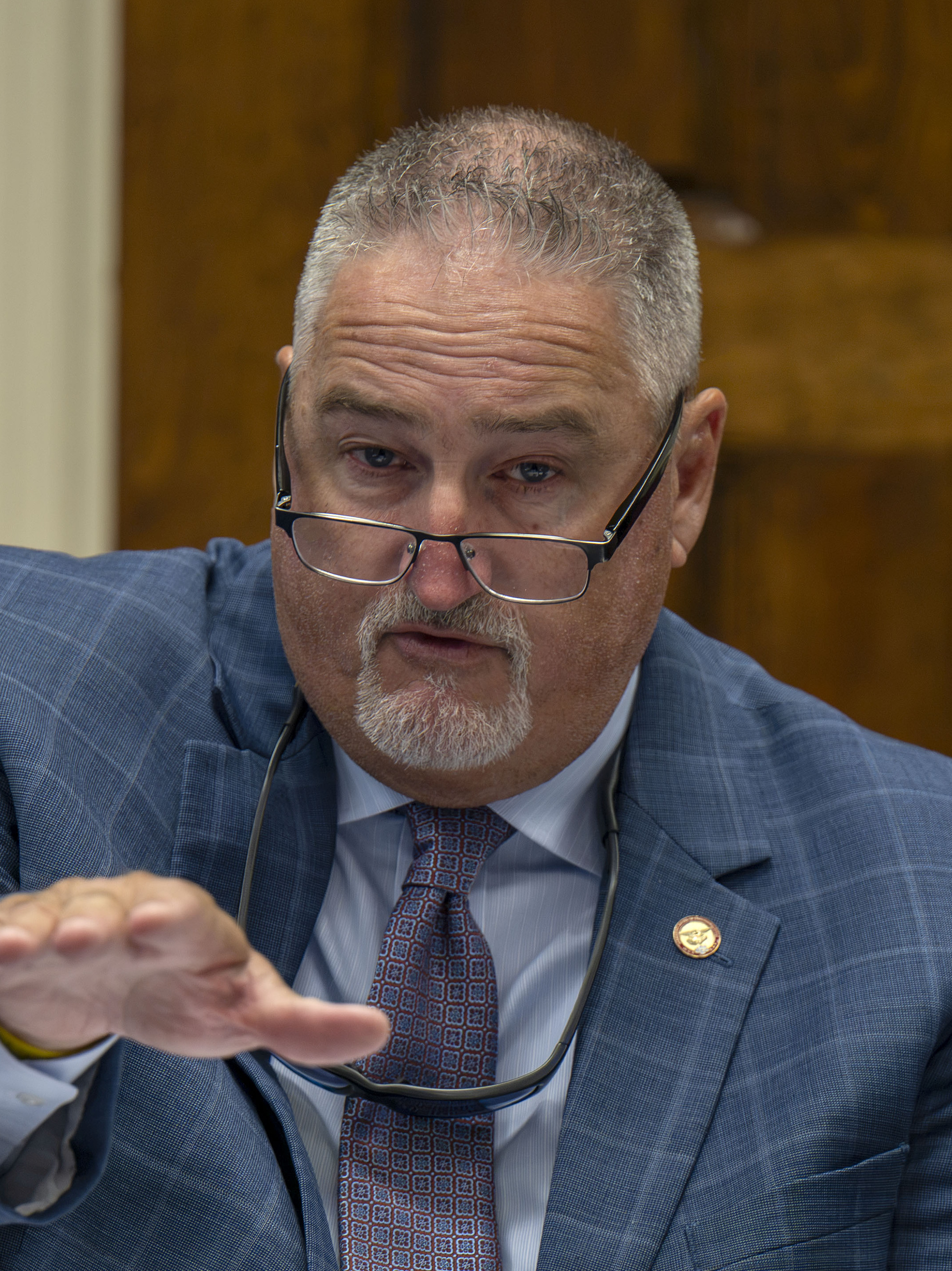
- Mangold speaking in 2026

Member of the Mississippi House of Representatives from the 53rd district
- Incumbent
- Assumed office January 5, 2016
- Preceded by: Robert Moak

Personal details
- Born: July 22, 1964 (age 62) Clark Air Base, Philippines
- Party: Republican

Vince Mangold (born July 22, 1964) is an American politician who has served in the Mississippi House of Representatives from the 53rd district since 2016.
