= Jim Estrada =

American politician

Member of the Mississippi House of Representatives from the 33rd district
- Incumbent
- Assumed office January 2, 2024
- Preceded by: Thomas Reynolds II

Personal details
- Party: Republican
- Spouse: Jan Ladner
- Occupation: Politician
- Profession: Banker

Jim Estrada serves as a member of the Mississippi House of Representatives for the 33rd District, affiliating with the Republican Party, a position he has held since 2024.
