= Thomas Weathersby Sr. =

American politician

Member of the Mississippi House of Representatives from the 62nd district
- In office 1992 – January 2, 2024
- Succeeded by: Lance Varner

Personal details
- Born: July 24, 1944 (age 82) Jackson, Mississippi, U.S.
- Party: Republican

Thomas Weathersby Sr. (born July 24, 1944) is an American politician. He is a former member of the Mississippi House of Representatives from the 62nd District, being first elected in 1991 and serving till 2024. He is a member of the Republican party.
