= Timaka James-Jones =

American politician

Member of the Mississippi House of Representatives from the 51st district
- Incumbent
- Assumed office January 2, 2024
- Preceded by: Rufus Straughter

Personal details
- Born: August 16, 1973 (age 52) Belzoni, Mississippi
- Party: Democratic
- Spouse: Marvin Vernard Jones
- Occupation: Circuit Clerk & County Registrar
- Profession: Politician

Timaka James-Jones serves as a member of the Mississippi House of Representatives for the 51st District, affiliating with the Democratic Party, a position she has held since 2024.

James-Jones was the first female African-American Justice Court Judge elected in Humphreys County, as well as the first African-American elected female Circuit Clerk in Humphreys County.
