= Jay McKnight (politician) =

American politician

Member of the Mississippi House of Representatives from the 95th district
- Incumbent
- Assumed office January 7, 2020
- Preceded by: Patricia H. Willis

Personal details
- Born: December 16, 1974 (age 51) Gulfport, Mississippi, U.S.
- Party: Republican

Jay McKnight (born December 16, 1974) is an American politician serving as a member of the Mississippi House of Representatives from the 95th district. Elected in November 2019, he assumed office on January 7, 2020.

== Early life and education ==
McKnight was born in Gulfport, Mississippi in 1974. He attended Mississippi Gulf Coast Community College.

== Career ==
McKnight began his career for the secretary of state of Mississippi. He also served as chief of staff of the Mississippi Public Service Commission and investigator in the Mississippi Office of the State Auditor. He later served as an investigator for the Harrison County Sheriff's Office. McKnight is the owner of John Jay Construction and Jay McKnight Properties. He was elected to the Mississippi House of Representatives in November 2019 and assumed office on January 7, 2020.
