= Deborah Butler Dixon =

American politician from the state of Mississippi

Member of the Mississippi House of Representatives from the 63rd district
- In office January 3, 2012 – January 7, 2020
- Preceded by: Walter L. Robinson
- Succeeded by: Stephanie Foster

Personal details
- Born: Deborah Butler Dixon; February 22, 1961 (age 65) Bolton, Mississippi
- Party: Democratic
- Education: Hinds Community College

Deborah Butler Dixon (born February 22, 1961) is an American politician who has served as the Hinds County District 3 supervisor since 2024. A Democrat, she previously served in the Mississippi House of Representatives from the 63rd district from 2012 to 2020. Dixon lost reelection to political newcomer Stephanie Foster in the 2019 general legislature election.
