= Clay Deweese =

American politician (born 1981)

Member of the Mississippi House of Representatives from the 12th district
- Incumbent
- Assumed office January 2020
- Preceded by: J. P. Hughes Jr.

Personal details
- Born: November 13, 1981 (age 44) Clarksdale, Mississippi, U.S.
- Party: Republican
- Education: University of Mississippi (BS)

Clay Deweese (born November 13, 1981) is an American real estate broker and politician serving as a member of the Mississippi House of Representatives from the 12th district.

== Early life and education ==
Deweese was born in Clarksdale, Mississippi. He graduated from the University of Mississippi School of Business Administration in 2004.

== Career ==
Deweese works as a real estate broker and lives in Oxford, Mississippi. He is a member of the Mississippi House of Representatives, having represented the state's 12th House district, composed of part of Lafayette County, since 2020.
