= Steve Hopkins (Mississippi politician) =

American politician

Member of the Mississippi House of Representatives from the 7th district
- In office January 5, 2016 – January 2, 2024
- Succeeded by: Kimberly Remak

Personal details
- Born: June 30, 1962 (age 64) Memphis, Tennessee, U.S.
- Party: Republican
- Spouse: Beckie Hopkins

Steve Hopkins (born June 30, 1962) is an American Republican politician. He is a former member of the Mississippi House of Representatives, representing the 7th district, composed of DeSoto County, from 2016 to 2024.

== Biography ==
Steve Hopkins was born on June 30, 1962, in Memphis, Tennessee. He has graduated from Southaven High School, Northwest Mississippi Junior College, and the University of Mississippi. He is a resident of Southaven, Mississippi, and a Quality Assurance team member at FedEx. In 2016, he became a member of the Mississippi House of Representatives, representing Mississippi's 7th House district, composed of DeSoto County.
