= Gene Newman =

American politician

Member of the Mississippi House of Representatives from the 61st district
- Incumbent
- Assumed office 2020
- Preceded by: Ray Rogers

Personal details
- Born: December 12, 1955 (age 70) Brookhaven, Mississippi
- Party: Republican
- Education: University of Cincinnati (MS); University of Southern Mississippi (BA); Copiah-Lincoln Community College
- Profession: Insurance agent

Gene Newman is an American politician from the Republican Party. He is a member of the Mississippi House of Representatives from the 61st District.
