= Robert Moak =

American politician and former Chair of the Mississippi Democratic Party

Bobby Moak

Chair of the Mississippi Democratic Party
- In office June 25, 2016 – July 25, 2020
- Preceded by: Rickey Cole
- Succeeded by: Tyree Irving

Personal details
- Born: July 13, 1958 (age 68) Chicago, Illinois, U.S.
- Party: Democratic
- Education: Southwest Mississippi Community College; University of Mississippi, Oxford (BPA); Mississippi College (JD)

Robert Warren "Bobby" Moak (born July 13, 1958) is an American politician and attorney. He is a former member of the Mississippi House of Representatives from the 53rd District, serving from 1984 until 2016. While in office he served as Democratic Leader but is remembered as the main legislative force in a Special Legislative Session after Hurricane Katrina in 2005. As Chair of the MS House Gaming Committee, Moak's legislation and abilities help revitalize the gulf-coast and the gaming industry after its destruction by the hurricane allowing casinos to operate on land instead of over water prior to the hurricane. Moak reached across party lines in the legislature and worked with then Governor Haley Barbour to secure the legislation. He is a member of the Democratic Party.

Moak was admitted to the Mississippi Bar in 1994. He graduated from the Mississippi College School of Law in 1991. Prior to that, he received a Bachelor's degree from University of Mississippi in 1980 and an Associate degree from Southwest Mississippi Junior College in 1978. As an attorney, he serves clients in personal injury, criminal and product liability matters.

Moak is married to the former Geraldine Lanier Cumbaa (MSU-BS: Delta State-MS) of Leland, MS. Cumbaa's family has extensive land holdings in the Mississippi Delta. They have two adult children, Drew now of Corinth, MS (B.A. Ole Miss, Master's in Sports Adm. Belmont) and Sykes of Greenville, SC (B.S. Auburn and Dr. of PT, Southwest Missouri Baptist). They share time in their Mississippi, Florida and North Carolina properties.

Moak is active in the practice of law, farming and real-estate. He practices law in Bogue Chitto, MS. Having been recognized as one of Mississippi's 50 Most Influential People, Moak has been successful in mass tort litigation, wrongful death and is a sought-after criminal attorney. After leaving the legislature, Moak has taken on governmental clients and expanded his client base.

He was counsel with the author John Grisham in a Lincoln County, MS civil jury trial. Their client was awarded the largest verdict in the county at the time. A Grisham novel was later dedicated to Moak, as the two were elected to the legislature in 1983 and have remained friends.

Party political offices
Preceded by Rickey Cole	Chair of the Mississippi Democratic Party; 2016–2020	Succeeded by Tyree Irving
