= Larry Byrd =

American politician

Member of the Mississippi House of Representatives from the 104th district
- Incumbent
- Assumed office January 8, 2008
- Preceded by: Mike Lott

Personal details
- Born: August 1, 1948 (age 77) Hattiesburg, Mississippi, U.S.
- Party: Republican
- Spouse: Karen Devereaux

Military service
- Allegiance: United States
- Branch/service: United States Army
- Unit: 82nd Airborne Division

Larry Byrd (born August 1, 1948) is an American politician. He is a member of the Mississippi House of Representatives from the 104th District, being first elected in 2007. He is a member of the Republican Party. He served in the US Army's 82nd Airborne Division.
