= Cedric Burnett =

American politician (born 1966)

Member of the Mississippi House of Representatives from the 9th district
- Incumbent
- Assumed office January 2016

Personal details
- Born: February 24, 1966 (age 60) Sardis, Mississippi, U.S.
- Party: Democratic

Cedric Burnett (born February 24, 1966) is a Democratic member of the Mississippi House of Representatives. He has represented the state's 9th House district, composed of parts of Coahoma, Quitman, Tate, and Tunica counties, since 2016.

== Biography ==
Cedric Burnett was born on February 24, 1966, in Sardis, Mississippi. He attended Northwest Community College and the University of Memphis. He is a mortician by career. In 2015, he was elected to represent Mississippi's 9th House district, composed of portions of Coahoma, Quitman, Tate, and Tunica counties, in the Mississippi House of Representatives, and was inaugurated in 2016. In the 2020–2024 term, he is the chairman of the House's Youth and Family Affairs Committee.
