= Jeffrey Guice =

American politician

Jeffrey S. Guice

Member of the Mississippi House of Representatives from the 114th district
- Incumbent
- Assumed office 2008

Personal details
- Born: December 22, 1959 (age 66) El Paso, Texas, U.S.
- Party: Republican
- Profession: Real Estate Broker/Representative

Jeffrey S. Guice (born December 22, 1959) is an American Republican politician of Ocean Springs, Mississippi. Since 2008, he has been a member of the Mississippi House of Representatives from the 114th District. He has listed his profession as real estate broker.

He is the chair of the Interstate Cooperation Committee and also sits on the committees for:

- Education
- Insurance
- Ports, Harbors and Airports
- Public Health and Human Services
- Technology
- Tourism
- Ways and Means.

Guice is among a group of lawmakers who in 2016 were camping on state-owned property at the Mississippi Fairgrounds, according to members of the group and observations by the Jackson Clarion-Ledger. They called themselves the "Camper Caucus."
