= Angela Cockerham =

American politician from Mississippi (born 1976)

Member of the Mississippi House of Representatives from the 96th district
- Incumbent
- Assumed office 2006

Personal details
- Born: August 20, 1976 (age 50) Jackson, Mississippi, U.S.
- Party: Independent (since 2019); Democratic (until 2019)
- Education: Jackson State University; Tufts University; Loyola University, New Orleans
- Occupation: Attorney, law professor

Angela Cockerham is an American politician currently serving as an independent member of the Mississippi House of Representatives, representing the 96th district. She joined the Mississippi House appropriations committee in 2013.

== Political career ==
According to Cockerham, she doesn't cast votes based on her party affiliation but based upon her beliefs.

In its 2017 rankings of the members of the Mississippi legislature, the American Conservative Union (ACU) found Cockerham to be the most conservative Democrat in the state House of Representatives, with an overall rating of 56 percent (the average for Democratic representatives that year was 28 percent).
