= Shane Aguirre =

American politician (born 1972)

Member of the Mississippi House of Representatives from the 17th district
- Incumbent
- Assumed office January 2016

Personal details
- Born: December 11, 1972 (age 53) Tupelo, Mississippi, U.S.
- Party: Republican

Shane Aguirre (born December 11, 1972) is an American accountant and Republican politician. He is a current member of the Mississippi House of Representatives, having represented the state's 17th House district since 2016.

== Biography ==
Shane Aguirre was born on December 11, 1972, in Tupelo, Mississippi. He has graduated from Mississippi State University and the University of Mississippi. He is an accountant. He has represented Mississippi's 17th House district, composed of a portion of Lee County, as a Republican in the Mississippi House of Representatives since January 2016. In 2020, he filed a House bill that would regulate liquor sampling events.

In 2020, Aguirre voted yes on the bill to change the Mississippi State Flag.
