= Bill Pigott =

American politician

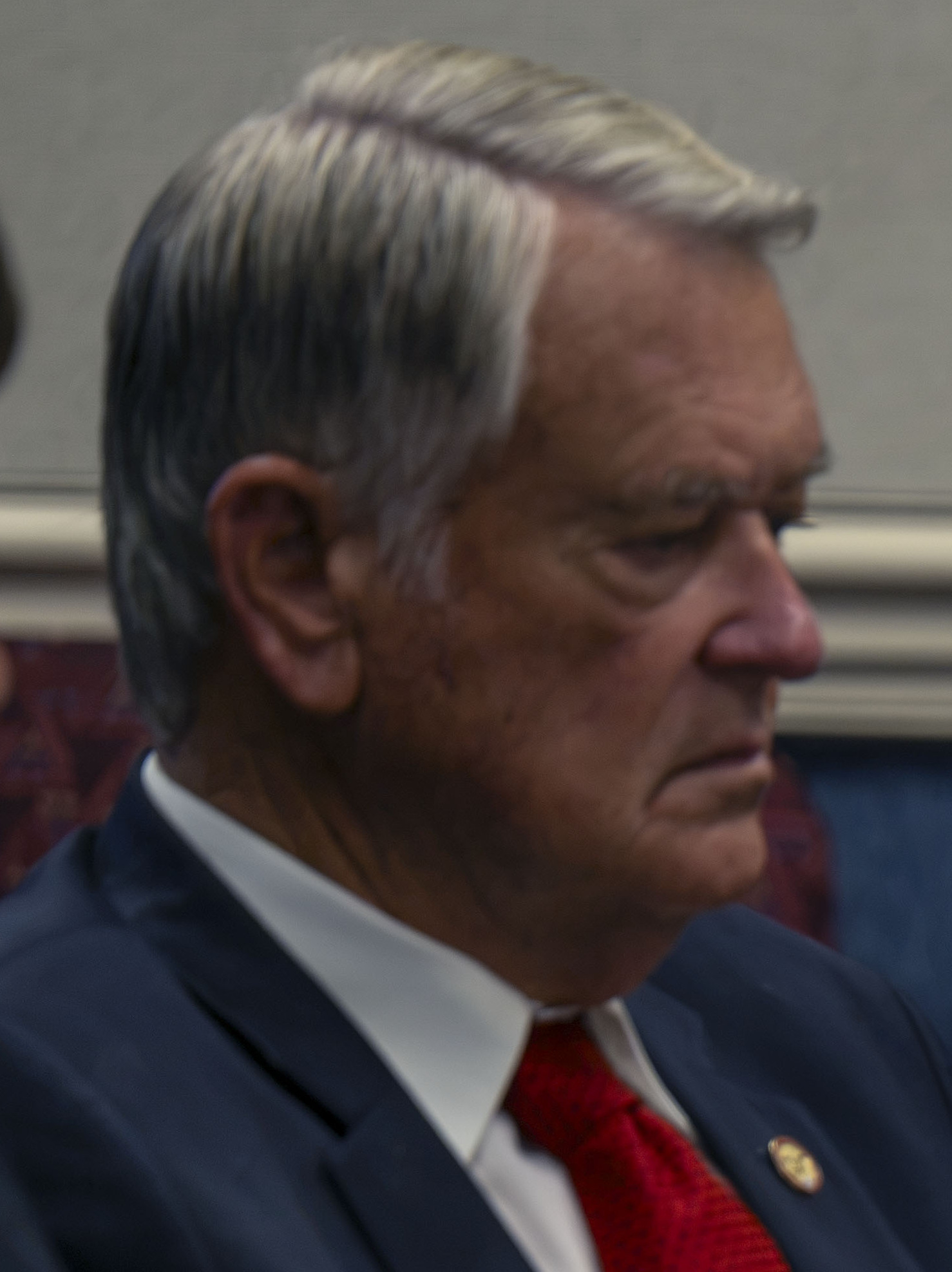
- Piggot in 2026

Member of the Mississippi House of Representatives from the 99th district
- Incumbent
- Assumed office 2008

Personal details
- Born: October 13, 1946 (age 79) Tylertown, Mississippi, U.S.
- Party: Republican

Bill Pigott (born October 13, 1946) is an American politician. He has been serving as a Republican member of the Mississippi House of Representatives from the 99th District since being elected in 2007.

He graduated from Dexter High School, Pearl River Community College, and Mississippi State University.
