= Karl Oliver =

American politician

- Oliver in 2022

Member of the Mississippi House of Representatives from the 46th district
- Incumbent
- Assumed office 2016

Personal details
- Born: March 24, 1963 (age 63) Winona, Mississippi, U.S.
- Party: Republican
- Spouse: Lynn Kellum Glenn
- Education: Northwest Mississippi Community College
- Occupation: Funeral director
- Website: billstatus.ls.state.ms.us/members/house/oliver.xml

Karl Oliver (born March 24, 1963) is a member of the Mississippi House of Representatives for District 46, which encompasses Carroll, Grenada, Leflore, Montgomery, and Webster counties in the north central portion of his state.

Oliver resides in his native Winona in Montgomery County. He is a 1981 graduate of Winona High School and Northwest Mississippi Community College in Senatobia. A funeral home director, he has formerly lived in Grenada, Amory, Starkville, Tupelo, and Brandon, Mississippi.

== Political career ==
On August 26, 2015, Oliver defeated Shed Hunger in the Republican primary runoff election for House District 46. Then in the general election, Oliver defeated the Democrat Ken Strachan with 57 percent of the ballots cast.

=== Taxpayer Pay Raise Act of 2016 ===
Oliver supported the Taxpayer Pay Raise Act of 2016, and suggested to an Illinois-born Mississippian who was critical of the bill that she might consider returning to her native state.

=== Statement in favor of lynching ===
On May 20, 2017, Oliver submitted a Facebook post stating that the Louisiana lawmakers who supported the removal of Confederate monuments and memorials in their state "should be LYNCHED". He made the statement following the removal of the Robert E. Lee Monument, the last of a group of Confederate monuments removed from New Orleans, Louisiana. His statement compared the removal of monuments to Nazi book burnings. House Speaker Philip Gunn condemned Oliver's statement, and stripped him of his vice-chairmanship of the House Forestry Committee.

On May 22, 2017, Oliver apologized, after his statement caused national outrage. Oliver's district includes the town of Money, where African American teenager Emmett Till was lynched.

The Mississippi Legislative Black Caucus, Mississippi NAACP, Mississippi Clarion-Ledger newspaper, and the Southern Poverty Law Center have called for Oliver to resign for his statements. The ACLU of Mississippi has called for Oliver's statement to be investigated for violations of either the state Code of Ethics or the rules of the legislature.

=== War on Terror ===
Oliver has stated his perspective that the policies of the Obama Administration made the US less secure against terrorism, and accused the Administration of "aiding in transporting these same Muslim extremist into our nation".

=== School choice ===
Oliver has supported school choice, and was given an "A" ranking on the issue by Enpower Mississippi in the group's 2016 Education Report Card.
