= Justin Keen (politician) =

American politician

Member of the Mississippi House of Representatives from the 6th district
- Incumbent
- Assumed office January 2, 2024
- Preceded by: Dana Criswell

Personal details
- Born: Byhalia, Mississippi Crane, Texas
- Party: Republican
- Spouse: Ariel Fox
- Education: University of Mississippi
- Occupation: Home builder, Developer
- Profession: Politician

Justin Keen is a Republican member of the Mississippi House of Representatives, representing the 6th District of Mississippi since 2024. He is a former DeSoto County Sheriff's deputy and SWAT Team sniper, currently working as a land developer.

On January 22, 2025, Keen introduced House Bill 1484, which proposes the creation of a "bounty hunter" program to enable "certified individuals" to locate and detain undocumented immigrants, sentencing them to life imprisonment without the possibility of parol. The bill has faced significant criticism from immigration attorneys and advocacy groups for its legal and logistical challenges.
