= Stephen Horne =

American politician

Member of the Mississippi House of Representatives from the 81st district
- Incumbent
- Assumed office 2004

Personal details
- Born: June 10, 1958 (age 68) Meridian, Mississippi, U.S.
- Party: Republican

Stephen Horne (born June 10, 1958) is an American politician. He is a member of the Mississippi House of Representatives from the 81st District, being first elected in 2003. He is a member of the Republican party.
