= Hester Jackson-McCray =

American politician (born 1961)

Member of the Mississippi House of Representatives from the 40th district
- Incumbent
- Assumed office January 7, 2020
- Preceded by: Ashley Henley

Personal details
- Born: May 19, 1961 (age 65) Drew, Mississippi, U.S.
- Party: Democratic

Hester Jackson-McCray (born May 19, 1961) is an American politician in the state of Mississippi. A member of the Democratic Party, she is the representative for District 40 of the Mississippi House of Representatives, defeating incumbent Ashley Henley.

Jackson-McCray was the first African American to represent DeSoto County in the Legislature, and she will be just the third African American to represent a majority-white legislative district since Reconstruction.

== Biography ==
She was born on May 19, 1961, in Drew, Mississippi. She is a nurse and lives in Horn Lake, Mississippi.
