= Becky Currie =

American politician

Member of the Mississippi House of Representatives from the 92nd district
- Incumbent
- Assumed office 2008

Personal details
- Born: May 2, 1957 (age 69)
- Party: Republican

Becky Currie (born May 2, 1957) is an American nurse and politician. She is a Republican member of the Mississippi House of Representatives from the 92nd District, being first elected in 2007.

== Legislation ==
In 2018, Representative Currie sponsored the Gestational Age Act (HB 1510), prohibiting abortions after 15 weeks gestation. The bill, signed into law by Mississippi Governor Phil Bryant (R) on March 19, 2018, allows abortion only in cases of medical emergency or severe fetal abnormality, with no allowance made for rape. The act was challenged, and the resulting Supreme Court case, Dobbs v. Jackson Women's Health Organization, upheld the act and overturned the previous precedent of Roe v. Wade that protected abortion access in the United States.

In 2020, Currie voted yes on the bill to change the Mississippi State Flag. In 2025, she sponsored a bill to improve access to healthcare for prison inmates.
