= Bo Brown (politician) =

American politician (1949–2026)

Member of the Mississippi House of Representatives from the 70th district
- In office January 7, 2020 – June 8, 2026
- Preceded by: Kathy L. Sykes

Personal details
- Born: William Brown; November 8, 1949
- Died: June 8, 2026 (aged 76)
- Party: Democratic
- Education: Tennessee State University (BA); Jackson State University (MPPA)

William R. "Bo" Brown (November 8, 1949 – June 8, 2026) was an American politician who served as a member of the Mississippi House of Representatives for the 70th district from 2020 until his death in 2026.

== Education ==
Brown earned a Bachelor of Arts degree in political science from Tennessee State University and a Master of Public Policy and Administration from Jackson State University. He was also a postgraduate at Santa Clara University.

== Career ==
From 1967 to 1971, Brown worked as a teacher and coach in the Jackson Public School District. He later served as a community relations specialist for the United States Department of Justice. From 1972 to 1983, he was a program manager at the United States Department of Housing and Urban Development.

Brown was a radio broadcaster for WOKJ and WKXI-FM before becoming an insurance agent at New York Life. Brown later worked as a financial representative for the Modern Woodmen of America and served as a member of the Jackson City Council. He was elected to the Mississippi House of Representatives in November 2019 and assumed office on January 7, 2020.

Other city officials were involved in a bribery scandal during his tenure on the city council.

== Death ==
Brown died on June 8, 2026, at the age of 76.
