= Jeff Hale =

American politician

Member of the Mississippi House of Representatives from the 24th district
- Incumbent
- Assumed office January 2016
- Preceded by: Kevin Horan

Personal details
- Born: August 27, 1966 (age 59) Corinth, Mississippi, U.S.
- Party: Republican

Jeffrey S. "Jeff" Hale (born August 8, 1966) is an American Republican politician. He is a current member of the Mississippi House of Representatives, having represented Mississippi's 24th House district since 2016.

== Biography ==
Jeffrey S. Hale was born on August 27, 1966, in Corinth, Mississippi He has graduated from Northwest Mississippi Community College. By occupation, he is a fire chief and director of sales. He was elected to represent Mississippi's 24th House district as a Republican in the Mississippi House of Representatives for the 2016–2020 term. In the 2016–2020 term, he was the vice-chair of the House's Private Property committee. He was re-elected for the 2020–2024 term. In the 2020–2024 term, he is the vice-chair of the House's Energy committee.
