= Brent Powell =

American politician

Member of the Mississippi House of Representatives from the 59th district
- Incumbent
- Assumed office January 9, 2013
- Preceded by: Kevin McGee

Personal details
- Born: February 8, 1969 (age 57) Oklahoma City, Oklahoma, U.S.
- Party: Republican

Brent Powell (born February 8, 1969) is an American politician who has served in the Mississippi House of Representatives from the 59th district since 2013.
