= Noah Sanford =

American politician (born 1990)

Member of the Mississippi House of Representatives from the 90th district
- Incumbent
- Assumed office January 5, 2016

Personal details
- Born: Noah Lee Sanford; May 14, 1990 (age 36) Hattiesburg, Mississippi, U.S.
- Party: Republican
- Spouse: Clancy Smith Sanford
- Education: Jones County Junior College (AA); University of Mississippi (BA, JD)

Noah Lee Sanford (born May 14, 1990) is an American attorney and politician serving as a member of the Mississippi House of Representatives from the 90th district. Elected in November 2015, he assumed office on January 5, 2016.

== Early life and education ==
Sanford was born in Hattiesburg, Mississippi. He earned an Associate of Arts from Jones County Junior College, a Bachelor of Arts in American history from the University of Mississippi, and a Juris Doctor from the University of Mississippi School of Law.

== Career ==
Outside of politics, Sanford works as a real estate lawyer. He was elected to the Mississippi House of Representatives in November 2015 and assumed office on January 5, 2016. He serves as vice chair of the House Judiciary B Committee and previously served as vice chair of the House State Library Committee.
