= Steve Massengill =

American politician

Member of the Mississippi House of Representatives from the 13th district
- Incumbent
- Assumed office 2012

Personal details
- Born: November 21, 1966 (age 59)
- Party: Republican

Steve E. Massengill (born November 21, 1966) is an American Republican politician. Since 2012 he serves as member of the Mississippi House of Representatives from the 13th District.
