= Trey Lamar =

American lawyer and politician

Member of the Mississippi House of Representatives from the 8th district
- Incumbent
- Assumed office January 2012

Personal details
- Born: John Thomas Lamar III; August 5, 1980 (age 45) Senatobia, Mississippi, U.S.
- Party: Republican

John Thomas "Trey" Lamar III (born August 5, 1980) is an American lawyer and Republican politician. He is a current member of the Mississippi House of Representatives, having represented Mississippi's 8th House district, which comprises parts of Tate and Lafayette Counties, in the House since 2012.

== Biography ==
John Thomas Lamar III was born on August 5, 1980, in Senatobia, Mississippi. He attended Magnolia Heights School in Senatobia. He has graduated from the University of Mississippi, the Mississippi College School of Law, and Washington University in St. Louis. He has represented Mississippi's 8th House district, composed of parts of Tate and Lafayette Counties, in the Mississippi House of Representatives as a Republican since 2012. In the current (2020-2024) session, Lamar is the chairman of the House's Ways and Means committee.
