= Ken Morgan (politician) =

American politician

Member of the Mississippi House of Representatives from the 100th district
- Incumbent
- Assumed office 2007

Personal details
- Born: September 10, 1951 (age 74) Columbia, Mississippi, U.S.
- Party: Republican

Ken Morgan (born September 10, 1951) is an American politician. He is a member of the Mississippi House of Representatives from the 100th District, being first elected in 2007. He is a member of the Republican party.
