= Shane Barnett =

American politician

Member of the Mississippi House of Representatives from the 86th district
- Incumbent
- Assumed office January 5, 2016
- Preceded by: Sherra Lane

Personal details
- Born: July 4, 1986 (age 40) Laurel, Mississippi, U.S.
- Party: Republican

Shane Barnett (born July 4, 1986) is an American politician who has served in the Mississippi House of Representatives from the 86th district since 2016.
