= Lataisha Jackson =

American politician (born 1983)

Lataisha M. Jackson

Member of the Mississippi House of Representatives from the 11th district
- Incumbent
- Assumed office 2013
- Preceded by: Joe Gardner

Personal details
- Born: August 4, 1983 (age 42) Ford Ord, California, U.S.
- Party: Democratic
- Education: Alabama State University
- Occupation: Businesswoman

Lataisha Jackson (born August 4, 1983) is a Democratic member of the Mississippi House of Representatives, representing the 11th district. Jackson took office after winning a 2013 special election.

In 2022, Jackson made her first visit to Africa, visiting Nigeria for a series of engagements.
