= Casey Eure =

American politician

Member of the Mississippi House of Representatives from the 116th district
- Incumbent
- Assumed office February 3, 2011
- Preceded by: Steven Palazzo

Personal details
- Born: March 1, 1978 (age 48) Jackson, Mississippi, U.S.
- Children: 2
- Education: Mississippi Gulf Coast Community College

Casey Eure (born March 1, 1978) is an American politician and former law enforcement officer, currently serving as a member of the Mississippi House of Representatives, where he represents the 116th district.

== Education ==
Eure attended Mississippi Gulf Coast Community College and the University of Southern Mississippi Law Enforcement Academy.

== Career ==
Prior to entering politics, Eure worked for the Harrison County Sheriff's Department.

A Republican, he is a member of the Mississippi House of Representatives, first elected in a special election in 2011 to fill Steven Palazzo's seat, who was elected to the United States House of Representatives.

== Personal life ==
Eure is married to Jill (née Gary), with whom he has two children. He is Catholic.
