= Oscar Denton =

American politician

Member of the Mississippi House of Representatives from the 55th district
- Incumbent
- Assumed office November 2013
- Preceded by: George Flaggs Jr.

Personal details
- Born: July 30, 1953 (age 72) Vicksburg, Mississippi, U.S.
- Party: Democratic

Oscar Denton (born July 30, 1953) is an American politician who has served in the Mississippi House of Representatives from the 55th district since 2013.
