= Greg Haney =

American politician

Member of the Mississippi House of Representatives from the 118th district
- Incumbent
- Assumed office January 3, 2012
- Preceded by: Roger Ishee

Personal details
- Born: September 5, 1959 (age 66) Clarksdale, Mississippi, U.S.
- Party: Republican

Greg Haney (born September 5, 1959) is an American politician who has served in the Mississippi House of Representatives from the 118th district since 2012.
