= Richard Bennett (Mississippi politician) =

American politician

Member of the Mississippi House of Representatives from the 120th district
- Incumbent
- Assumed office January 3, 2008

Personal details
- Born: Richard Bennett; June 25, 1957 (age 69) Long Beach, Mississippi, U.S.
- Party: Republican
- Education: Mississippi Gulf Coast Community College; University of Southern Mississippi

Richard B. Bennett (born June 25, 1957) is an American Republican politician. He is a member of the Mississippi House of Representatives from the 120th District, being first elected in 2007.
