= Henry Zuber III =

American politician

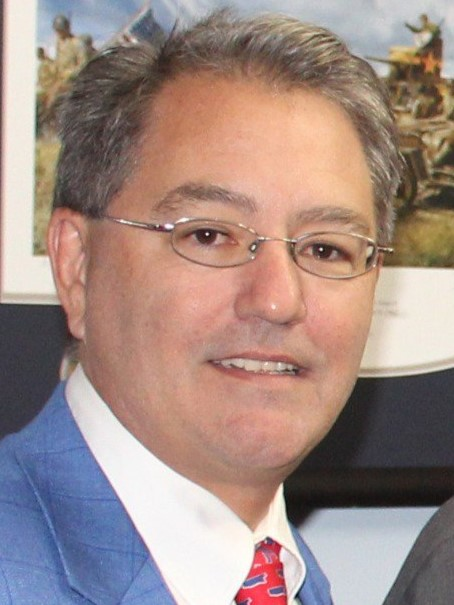

Member of the Mississippi House of Representatives from the 113th district
- Incumbent
- Assumed office 2000

Personal details
- Born: June 11, 1966 (age 60) Covington, Louisiana
- Party: Republican
- Profession: Attorney

Henry Zuber III (born June 11, 1966) is an American politician. A Republican, he has been representing District 113 in the Mississippi House of Representatives since being first elected in 1999.
