= 2019 United States state legislative elections =

- November 5, 2019

7 legislative chambers 4 states
| | Majority party | Minority party | Third party |
|---|---|---|---|
| Party | Republican | Democratic | Coalition |
| Chambers before | 61 | 37 | 1 (Note: The Alaska House of Representatives is controlled by a coalition of Democrats, Republicans, and independents. The minority caucus consists of Republicans who are not part of the majority coalition.) |
| Chambers after | 59 | 39 | 1 |
| Overall change | ▼2 | ▲2 | Steady |
- Map of upper house elections: Democrats gained control Republicans retained control Special elections held

- Map of lower house elections: Democrats gained control Democrats retained control Republicans retained control Special elections held

The 2019 United States state legislative elections were held on November 5, 2019. Seven legislative chambers in four states held regularly scheduled elections. These off-year elections coincided with other state and local elections, including gubernatorial elections in three states.

Democrats gained majorities of both houses of the Virginia General Assembly, giving them complete control of the legislature for the first time since 1996, and the first trifecta since 1994.

== Summary table ==
Regularly scheduled elections were held in 7 of the 99 state legislative chambers in the United States. Nationwide, regularly scheduled elections were held for 538 of the 7,383 legislative seats. This table only covers regularly scheduled elections; additional special elections took place concurrently with these regularly scheduled elections.

| State | Upper House | | | | Lower House | | | |
| State | Seats up | Total | % up | Term | Seats up | Total | % up | Term |
|---|---|---|---|---|---|---|---|---|
| Louisiana | 39 | 39 | 100 | 4 | 105 | 105 | 100 | 4 |
| Mississippi | 52 | 52 | 100 | 4 | 122 | 122 | 100 | 4 |
| New Jersey | 0 | 40 | 0 | 2/4 (Note: The upper houses of Arkansas, Delaware, Florida, Hawaii, Illinois, Minnesota, New Jersey, and Texas use a 2-4-4 term length system.) | 80 | 80 | 100 | 2 |
| Virginia | 40 | 40 | 100 | 4 | 100 | 100 | 100 | 2 |

== Election predictions ==
Several sites and individuals publish predictions of competitive chambers. These predictions look at factors such as the strength of the party, the strength of the candidates, and the partisan leanings of the state (reflected in part by the state's Cook Partisan Voting Index rating). The predictions assign ratings to each chambers, with the rating indicating the predicted advantage that a party has in winning that election.

Most election predictors use:

- "Tossup": No advantage
- "Tilt": Advantage that is not quite as strong as "lean"
- "Lean": Slight advantage
- "Likely": Significant, but surmountable, advantage
- "Safe" or "Solid": Near-certain chance of victory

| State | PVI | Chamber | Last election | Sabato October 31, 2019 | Result |
|---|---|---|---|---|---|
| Louisiana | R+11 | Senate | R 25-14 | Safe R | R 27-12 |
| Louisiana | R+11 | House of Representatives | R 61-39-5 | Safe R | R 68-35-2 |
| Mississippi | R+9 | Senate | R 33-19 | Safe R | R 36–16 |
| Mississippi | R+9 | House of Representatives | R 74-44-2 | Safe R | R 75-46-1 |
| New Jersey | D+7 | | | | |
| New Jersey | D+7 | General Assembly | D 54-26 | Safe D | D 52-28 |
| Virginia | D+1 | Senate | R 21-19 | Lean D (flip) | D 21-19 |
| Virginia | D+1 | House of Delegates | R 51-49 | Lean D (flip) | D 55-45 |

== State summaries ==
=== Louisiana ===
All seats of the Louisiana State Senate and the Louisiana House of Representatives were up for election to four-year terms in single-member districts. Republicans retained majority control in both chambers.

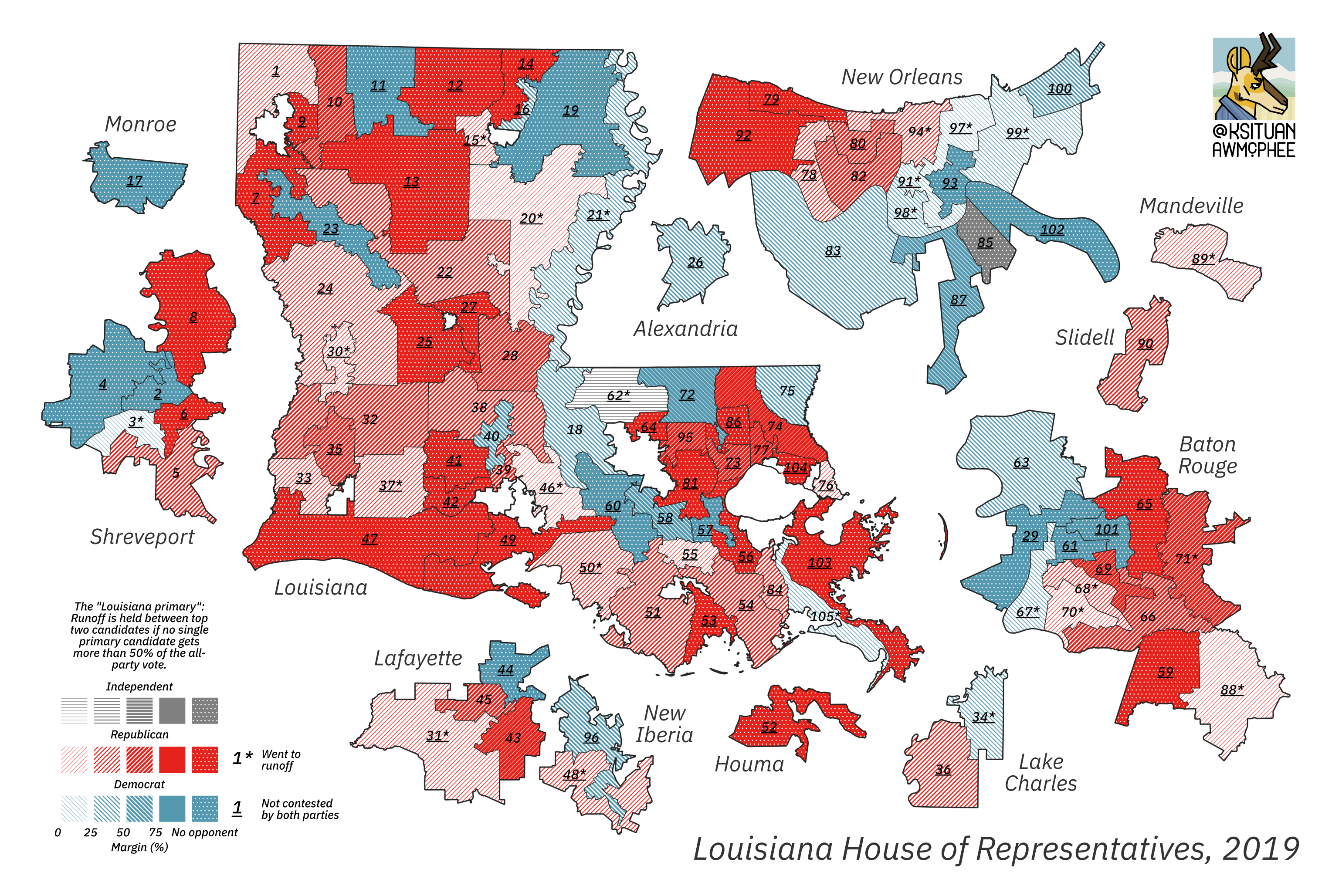
House of Representatives results

Louisiana State Senate
| Party | Leader | Before | After | Change |
|---|---|---|---|---|
| Republican | John Alario | 25 | 27 | ▲2 |
| Democratic | Troy Carter | 14 | 12 | ▼2 |
| Total | | 39 | 39 | |

Louisiana House of Representatives
| Party | Leader | Before | After | Change |
|---|---|---|---|---|
| Republican | Taylor Barras | 61 | 68 | ▲7 |
| Democratic | Robert Johnson | 39 | 35 | ▼4 |
| Independent | | 5 | 2 | ▼3 |
| Total | | 105 | 105 | |

=== Mississippi ===
All seats of the Mississippi State Senate and the Mississippi House of Representatives were up for election to four-year terms in single-member districts. Republicans retained majority control in both chambers.

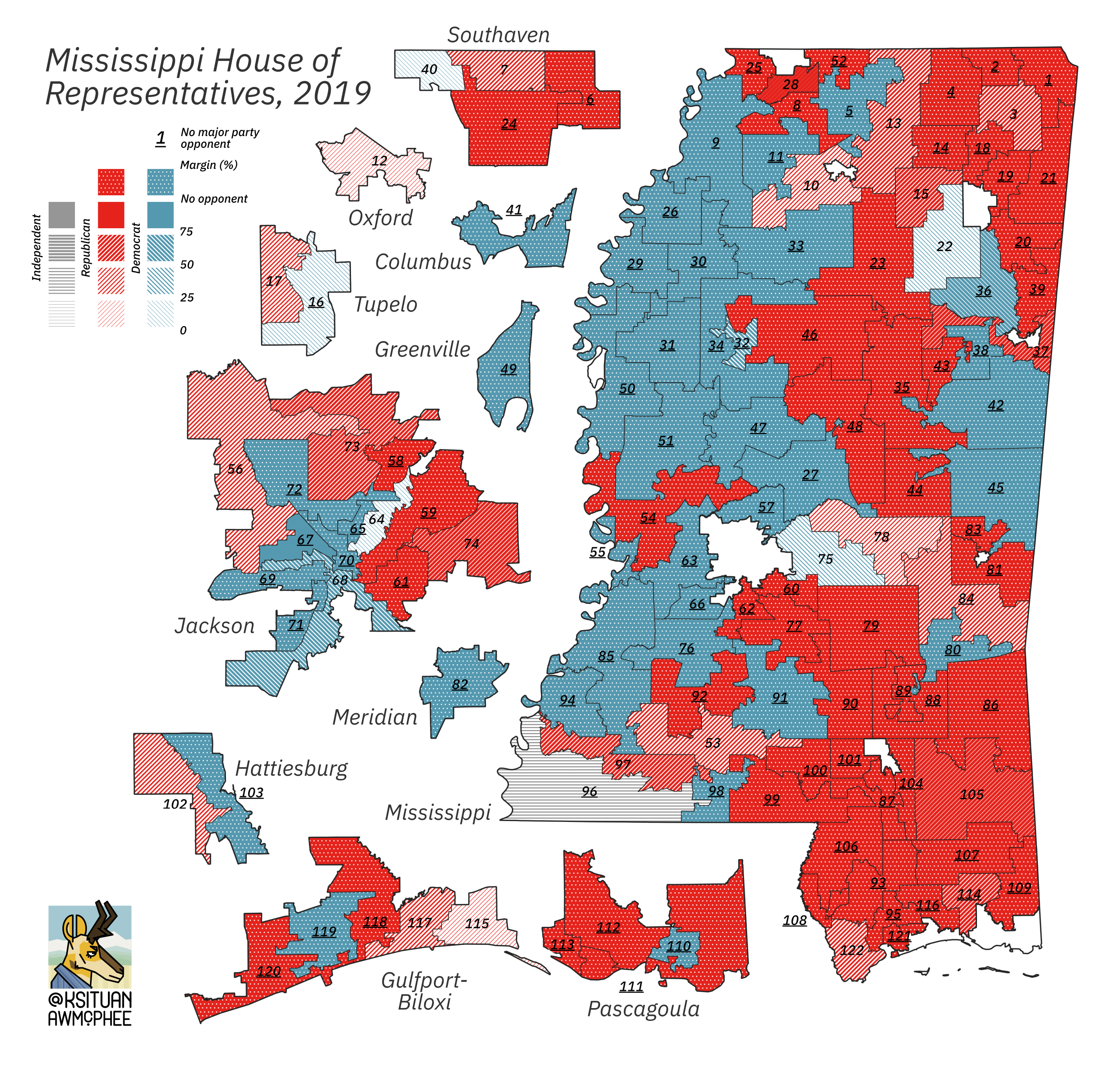
House of Representatives results

Mississippi State Senate
| Party | Leader | Before | After | Change |
|---|---|---|---|---|
| Republican | Gray Tollison | 33 | 36 | ▲3 |
| Democratic | Derrick Simmons | 19 | 16 | ▼3 |
| Total | | 52 | 52 | |

Mississippi House of Representatives
| Party | Leader | Before | After | Change |
|---|---|---|---|---|
| Republican | Philip Gunn | 74 | 75 | ▲1 |
| Democratic | David Baria | 44 | 46 | ▲2 |
| Independent | | 2 | 1 | ▼1 |
| Total | | 122 | 122 | |

=== New Jersey ===
All seats of the New Jersey General Assembly were up for election to two-year terms in coterminous two-member districts. The New Jersey Senate did not hold regularly scheduled elections. Democrats maintained majority control in the lower house.

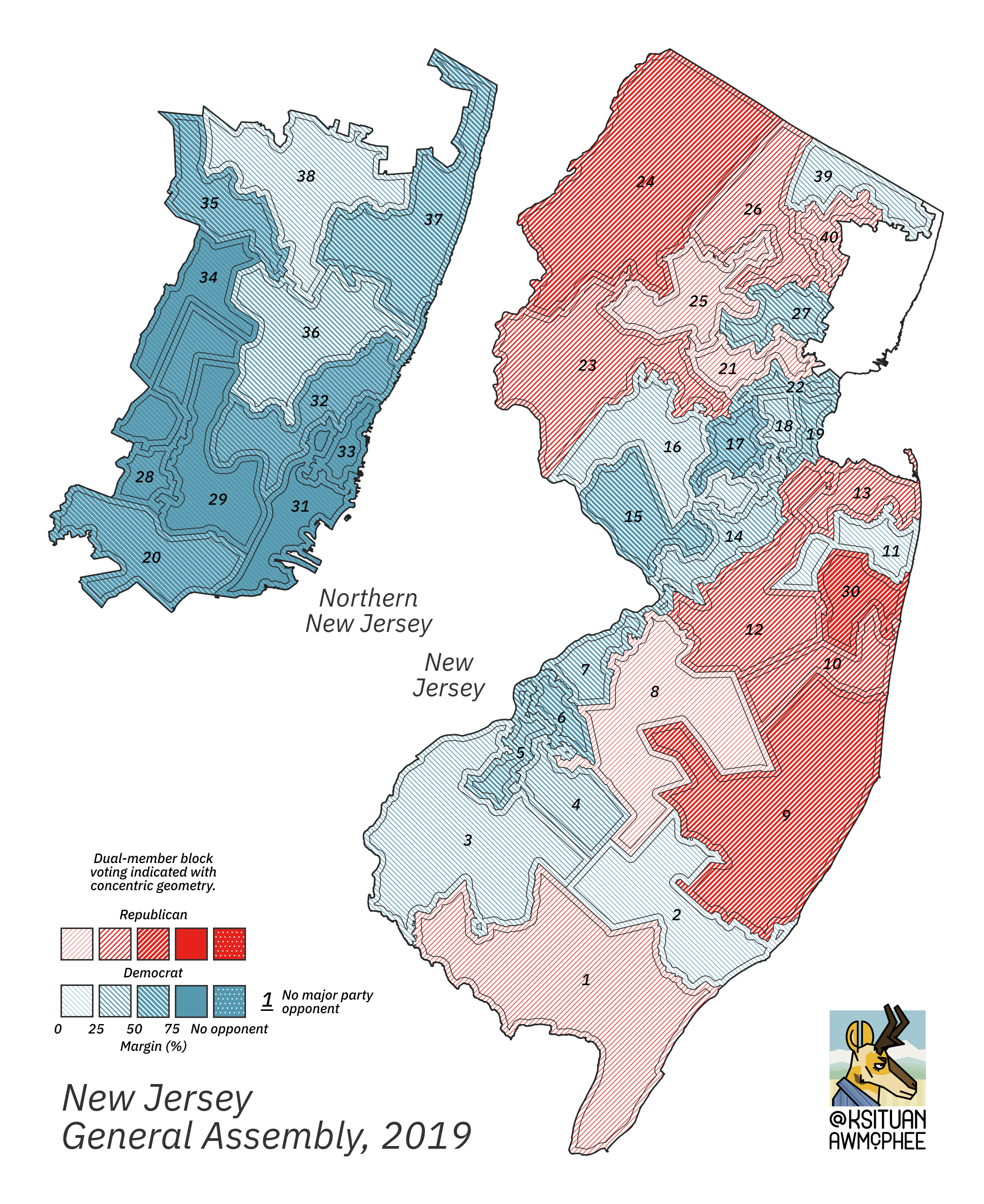
General Assembly results

New Jersey General Assembly
| Party | Leader | Before | After | Change |
|---|---|---|---|---|
| Democratic | Craig Coughlin | 54 | 52 | ▼2 |
| Republican | Jon Bramnick | 26 | 28 | ▲2 |
| Total | | 80 | 80 | |

=== Virginia ===
All seats of the Senate of Virginia and the Virginia House of Delegates were up for election in single-member districts. Senators were elected to four-year terms, while delegates serve terms of two years. Democrats gained control of both legislative chambers, establishing the first Democratic trifecta in Virginia since 1994.

Senate results

House of Delegates results

Senate of Virginia
| Party | Leader | Before | After | Change |
|---|---|---|---|---|
| Democratic | Dick Saslaw | 19 | 21 | ▲2 |
| Republican | Tommy Norment | 21 | 19 | ▼2 |
| Total | | 40 | 40 | |

Virginia House of Delegates
| Party | Leader | Before | After | Change |
|---|---|---|---|---|
| Democratic | Eileen Filler-Corn | 49 | 55 | ▲6 |
| Republican | Kirk Cox | 51 | 45 | ▼6 |
| Total | | 100 | 100 | |

== Special elections ==
Total net change in legislative seats due to special elections in 2019: +1 Dem seat / +1 Rep seat +2 Rep seats / +1 Ind seat

Various states held special elections for legislative districts throughout the year. Overall, Republicans flipped five seats from Democrats, with two in the Connecticut House of Representatives, one in the Minnesota Senate, one in the Kentucky House of Representatives, and one in the New Jersey Senate. Democrats flipped two seats from Republicans, with one in the Missouri House of Representatives and one in the Pennsylvania State Senate. An independent flipped one seat from Republicans in the Louisiana House of Representatives.

=== Alabama ===
Two special elections were held for the Alabama Legislature in 2019.

| District | | Incumbent | | | This race | |
| Chamber | No. | Representative | Party | First elected | Results | Candidates |
|---|---|---|---|---|---|---|
| House | 42 | Jimmy Martin | Republican | 2014 | Incumbent died May 31, 2019, of cancer. New member elected November 5, 2019. Republican hold. | ▌ ✓ Ivan Smith (Republican) 88.2%; ▌ Kenneth Allison (Democratic) 11.4% |
| House | 74 | Dimitri Polizos | Republican | 2013 (special) | Incumbent died March 27, 2019, of a heart attack. New member elected November 12, 2019. Republican hold. | ▌ ✓ Charlotte Meadows (Republican) 68.0%; ▌ Rayford Mack (Democratic) 31.4% |

=== Arkansas ===
One special election was held for the Arkansas General Assembly in 2019.

| District | | Incumbent | | | This race | |
| Chamber | No. | Representative | Party | First elected | Results | Candidates |
|---|---|---|---|---|---|---|
| House | 36 | Charles Blake | Democratic | 2014 | Incumbent resigned May 16, 2019, to take a job with the Mayor of Little Rock Frank Scott Jr. New member elected outright after the November 5, 2019 general election was cancelled. Democratic hold. | ▌ ✓ Denise Jones Ennett (Democratic) |

=== California ===
Three special elections were held for the California State Legislature in 2019.

| District | | Incumbent | | | This race | |
| Chamber | No. | Representative | Party | First elected | Results | Candidates |
|---|---|---|---|---|---|---|
| Senate | 1 | Ted Gaines | Republican | 2011 (special) | Incumbent resigned January 7, 2019, after being elected to the California State Board of Equalization. New member elected June 4, 2019, after no one received over 50% of the vote on March 26, 2019. Republican hold. | ▌ ✓ Brian Dahle (Republican) 53.9%; ▌ Kevin Kiley (Republican) 46.1% |
| Senate | 33 | Ricardo Lara | Democratic | 2012 | Incumbent resigned January 7, 2019, after being elected California Insurance Commissioner. New member elected June 4, 2019, after no one received over 50% of the vote on March 26, 2019. Democratic hold. | ▌ ✓ Lena Gonzalez (Democratic) 69.8%; ▌ Jack M. Guerrero (Republican) 30.2% |
| Assembly | 1 | Brian Dahle | Republican | 2012 | Incumbent resigned June 12, 2019, after being elected to the California State Senate. New member elected November 5, 2019, after no one received over 50% of the vote on August 27, 2019. Republican hold. | ▌ ✓ Megan Dahle (Republican) 57.3%; ▌ Elizabeth Betancourt (Democratic) 42.7% |

=== Connecticut ===
Seven special elections were held for the Connecticut General Assembly in 2019. Republicans flipped two seats previously held by Democrats.

| District | | Incumbent | | | This race | |
| Chamber | No. | Representative | Party | First elected | Results | Candidates |
|---|---|---|---|---|---|---|
| Senate | 3 | Tim Larson | Democratic | 2014 | Incumbent resigned January 8, 2019, after being appointed Executive Director of the Connecticut Office of Higher Education by Governor Ned Lamont. New member elected February 26, 2019. Democratic hold. | ▌ ✓ Saud Anwar (Democratic) 58.8%; ▌ Sarah Muska (Republican) 41.2% |
| Senate | 5 | Beth Bye | Democratic | 2010 | Incumbent resigned January 8, 2019, after being appointed Commissioner of the Connecticut Office of Early Childhood by Governor Ned Lamont. New member elected February 26, 2019. Democratic hold. | ▌ ✓ Derek Slap (Democratic) 63.3%; ▌ Bill Wadsworth (Republican) 34.3% |
| Senate | 6 | Terry Gerratana | Democratic | 2011 (special) | Incumbent resigned January 8, 2019, after being appointed to the Connecticut Office of Health Strategy by Governor Ned Lamont. New member elected February 26, 2019. Republican gain. | ▌ ✓ Gennaro Bizzarro (Republican) 53.1%; ▌ Rick Lopes (Democratic) 46.9% |
| House | 39 | Chris Soto | Democratic | 2016 | Incumbent resigned January 8, 2019, after being appointed Director of Legislative Affairs by Governor Ned Lamont. New member elected February 26, 2019. Democratic hold. | ▌ ✓ Anthony Nolan (Democratic) 51.3%; ▌ Mirna Martinez (Green) 28.5%; ▌▌ Kat Goulart (Republican) 14.7%; ▌ Jason Catala (independent) 5.4% |
| House | 99 | James Albis | Democratic | 2011 (special) | Incumbent resigned January 8, 2019, after being appointed to the Department of Energy and Environmental Protection by Governor Ned Lamont. New member elected February 26, 2019. Republican gain. | ▌ ✓ Joseph Zullo (Republican) 54.1%; ▌ Josh Balter (Democratic) 45.9% |
| House | 19 | Derek Slap | Democratic | 2016 | Incumbent resigned March 1, 2019, after being elected to the Connecticut State Senate. New member elected April 16, 2019. Democratic hold. | ▌ ✓ Tammy Exum (Democratic) 64.6%; ▌ Robert Margolis (Republican) 35.4% |
| House | 130 | Ezequiel Santiago | Democratic | 2008 | Incumbent died March 15, 2019, of a heart attack. New member elected May 7, 2019. Democratic hold. | ▌ ✓ Antonio Felipe (Democratic) 47.2%; ▌ Kate Rivera (independent) 34.8%; ▌ Christina Ayala (independent) 7.3%; ▌ Hector A. Diaz (independent) 6.8%; ▌ Josh Parrow (Republican) 4.0% |

=== Florida ===
Two special elections were held for the Florida Legislature in 2019.

| District | | Incumbent | | | This race | |
| Chamber | No. | Representative | Party | First elected | Results | Candidates |
|---|---|---|---|---|---|---|
| House | 7 | Halsey Beshears | Republican | 2012 | Incumbent resigned January 11, 2019, after being appointed Secretary of the Florida Department of Business and Professional Regulation by Governor Ron DeSantis. New member elected June 18, 2019. Republican hold. | ▌ ✓ Jason Shoaf (Republican) 71.3%; ▌ Ryan Terrell (Democratic) 28.7% |
| House | 38 | Danny Burgess | Republican | 2014 | Incumbent resigned January 24, 2019, after being appointed Executive Director of the Florida Department of Veterans Affairs by Governor Ron DeSantis. New member elected June 18, 2019. Republican hold. | ▌ ✓ Randy Maggard (Republican) 55.6%; ▌ Kelly Smith (Democratic) 44.4% |

=== Georgia ===
Four special elections were held for the Georgia General Assembly in 2019.

In Georgia's 28th House of Representatives district, a redo of the 2018 Republican primary was held on April 9, 2019, after results of both that primary and a December 2018 redo were deemed inconclusive. As no Democrats had filed in 2018, the winner of the primary was guaranteed the seat. Chris Erwin won the redo election by a wide margin, defeating prior incumbent Dan Gasaway.

| District | | Incumbent | | | This race | |
| Chamber | No. | Representative | Party | First elected | Results | Candidates |
|---|---|---|---|---|---|---|
| House | 5 | John Meadows III | Republican | 2004 | Incumbent died November 13, 2018, of cancer. New member elected February 5, 2019, after no one received over 50% of the vote on January 8, 2019. Republican hold. | ▌ ✓ Matt Barton (Republican) 55.0%; ▌ Jesse Vaughn (Republican) 45.0% |
| House | 176 | Jason Shaw | Republican | 2010 | Incumbent resigned January 3, 2019, after being appointed to the Georgia Public Service Commission by governor Nathan Deal. New member elected March 12, 2019, after no one received over 50% of the vote on February 12, 2019. Republican hold. | ▌ ✓ James Burchett (Republican) 59.3%; ▌ Franklin Patten (Republican) 40.7% |
| House | 71 | David Stover | Republican | 2012 | Incumbent resigned June 25, 2019, citing personal reasons. New member elected October 1, 2019, after no one received over 50% of the vote on September 3, 2019. Republican hold. | ▌ ✓ Philip Singleton (Republican) 58.8%; ▌ Marcy Westmoreland Sakrison (Republican) 41.2% |
| House | 152 | Ed Rynders | Republican | 2004 | Incumbent resigned September 5, 2019, citing health reasons. New member elected December 3, 2019, after no one received over 50% of the vote on November 5, 2019. Republican hold. | ▌ ✓ Bill Yearta (Republican) 50.9%; ▌ Jim Quinn (Republican) 49.1% |

=== Iowa ===
Two special elections were held for the Iowa General Assembly in 2019.

| District | | Incumbent | | | This race | |
| Chamber | No. | Representative | Party | First elected | Results | Candidates |
|---|---|---|---|---|---|---|
| Senate | 30 | Jeff Danielson | Democratic | 2004 | Incumbent resigned February 14, 2019, after leaving his job as a firefighter. New member elected March 19, 2019. Democratic hold. | ▌ ✓ Eric Giddens (Democratic) 56.8%; ▌ Walt Rogers (Republican) 42.1%; ▌ Fred Perryman (Libertarian) 1.1% |
| House | 46 | Lisa Heddens | Democratic | 2002 | Incumbent resigned June 17, 2019, after being appointed to the Story County Board of Supervisors. New member elected August 6, 2019. Democratic hold. | ▌ ✓ Ross Wilburn (Democratic) 97.5%; ▌ Write-ins 2.5% |

=== Kentucky ===
Three special elections were held for the Kentucky General Assembly in 2019. Republicans flipped one seat previously held by a Democrat.

| District | | Incumbent | | | This race | |
| Chamber | No. | Representative | Party | First elected | Results | Candidates |
|---|---|---|---|---|---|---|
| Senate | 31 | Ray Jones II | Democratic | 2000 | Incumbent resigned January 7, 2019, after being elected Judge/Executive of Pike County. New member elected March 5, 2019. Republican gain. | ▌ ✓ Phillip Wheeler (Republican) 52.3%; ▌ Darrell Pugh (Democratic) 47.7% |
| House | 18 | Tim Moore | Republican | 2006 | Incumbent resigned September 10, 2019, citing a belief in term limits. New member elected November 5, 2019. Republican hold. | ▌ ✓ Samara Heavrin (Republican) 60.3%; ▌ Becky Miller (Democratic) 39.7% |
| House | 63 | Diane St. Onge | Republican | 2012 | Incumbent resigned August 12, 2019, to move to California. New member elected November 5, 2019. Republican hold. | ▌ ✓ Kim Banta (Republican) 63.1%; ▌ Josh Blair (Democratic) 36.9% |

=== Louisiana ===
Seven special elections were held for the Louisiana State Legislature in 2019. An independent was elected in one seat previously held by a Republican.

| District | | Incumbent | | | This race | |
| Chamber | No. | Representative | Party | First elected | Results | Candidates |
|---|---|---|---|---|---|---|
| House | 12 | Rob Shadoin | Republican | 2011 | Incumbent resigned September 2018, to serve as deputy counsel in the Louisiana Department of Wildlife and Fisheries. New member elected February 23, 2019. Republican hold. | ▌ ✓ Chris Turner (Republican) 69.9%; ▌ Jake Halley (Republican) 30.1% |
| House | 26 | Jeff Hall | Democratic | 2015 (special) | Incumbent resigned December 4, 2018, after being elected mayor of Alexandria. New member elected February 23, 2019. Democratic hold. | ▌ ✓ Ed Larvadain (Democratic) 61.1%; ▌ Sandra Franklin (Democratic) 38.9% |
| House | 27 | Lowell Hazel | Republican | 2007 | Incumbent resigned December 3, 2018, after being elected as a judge for Louisiana's 9th district court. New member elected February 23, 2019. Republican hold. | ▌ ✓ Michael T. Johnson (Republican) 91.8%; ▌ Richard Kretzsinger (Democratic) 8.2% |
| House | 47 | Bob Hensgens | Republican | 2011 (special) | Incumbent resigned December 10, 2018, after being elected to the Louisiana State Senate. New member elected February 23, 2019. Republican hold. | ▌ ✓ Ryan Bourriaque (Republican) 63.5%; ▌ Ruben "Ben" Rivera, Jr. (Republican) 36.5% |
| House | 17 | Marcus Hunter | Democratic | 2011 | Incumbent resigned December 2018, after being elected as a judge for Louisiana's 4th district court. New member elected March 30, 2019, after no one received over 50% of the vote on February 23, 2019. Democratic hold. | ▌ ✓ Pat Moore (Democratic) 63.2%; ▌ Rodney McFarland, Sr. (Democratic) 36.8% |
| House | 18 | Major Thibaut | Democratic | 2008 (special) | Incumbent resigned December 31, 2018, to serve as president of Pointe Coupee Parish. New member elected March 30, 2019, after no one received over 50% of the vote on February 23, 2019. Democratic hold. | ▌ ✓ Jeremy LaCombe (Democratic) 68.5%; ▌ Tammi G. Fabre (Republican) 31.5% |
| House | 62 | Kenny Havard | Republican | 2011 | Incumbent resigned December 10, 2018, to serve as president of West Feliciana Parish. New member elected March 30, 2019, after no one received over 50% of the vote on February 23, 2019. Independent gain. | ▌ ✓ Roy Daryl Adams (independent) 53.6%; ▌ Dennis Aucoin (Republican) 46.4% |

=== Maine ===
Three special elections were held for the Maine Legislature in 2019.

| District | | Incumbent | | | This race | |
| Chamber | No. | Representative | Party | First elected | Results | Candidates |
|---|---|---|---|---|---|---|
| House | 124 | Aaron Frey | Democratic | 2012 | Incumbent resigned December 5, 2018, after being was appointed Maine Attorney General by the Maine Legislature. New member elected March 12, 2019. Democratic hold. | ▌ ✓ Joe Perry (Democratic) 64.8%; ▌ Thomas White (Republican) 35.2% |
| House | 52 | Jennifer DeChant | Democratic | 2012 | Incumbent resigned February 1, 2019, to take a job in the private sector. New member elected April 2, 2019. Democratic hold. | ▌ ✓ Sean Paulhus (Democratic) 66.5%; ▌ Kenneth Sener (Republican) 33.5% |
| House | 45 | Dale Denno | Democratic | 2016 | Incumbent resigned March 27, 2019, following a diagnosis of lung cancer. New member elected June 11, 2019. Democratic hold. | ▌ ✓ Stephen Moriarty (Democratic) 61.5%; ▌ Kenneth Sener (Republican) 38.3% |

=== Minnesota ===
Two special elections were held for the Minnesota Legislature in 2019. Republicans flipped one seat previously held by a Democrat.

| District | | Incumbent | | | This race | |
| Chamber | No. | Representative | Party | First elected | Results | Candidates |
|---|---|---|---|---|---|---|
| Senate | 11 | Tony Lourey | Democratic | 2006 | Incumbent resigned January 3, 2019, after being appointed Commissioner of Human Services by Governor Tim Walz. New member elected February 5, 2019. Republican gain. | ▌ ✓ Jason Rarick (Republican) 52.0%; ▌ Stu Lourey (Democratic-Farmer-Labor) 45.9%; ▌ John "Sparky" Birrenbach (Legal Marijuana Now) 1.9% |
| House | 11B | Jason Rarick | Republican | 2014 | Incumbent resigned February 12, 2019, after being elected to the Minnesota Senate. New member elected March 19, 2019. Republican hold. | ▌ ✓ Nathan Nelson (Republican) 68.4%; ▌ Tim Burkhardt (Democratic-Farmer-Labor) 31.5% |

=== Mississippi ===
Three special elections were held for the Mississippi Legislature in 2019.

| District | | Incumbent | | | This race | |
| Chamber | No. | Representative | Party | First elected | Results | Candidates |
|---|---|---|---|---|---|---|
| House | 32 | Willie Perkins Sr. | Democratic | 1993 | Incumbent resigned December 31, 2018, after being elected chancery judge for the 20th Chancery Court District of Mississippi (covering Leflore, Quitman, and Tallahatchie and Tunica counties). New member elected March 12, 2019. Democratic hold. | ▌ ✓ Solomon Curtis Osborne (Nonpartisan) 76.3%; ▌ Troy Brown Sr. (Nonpartisan) 23.7% |
| House | 71 | Adrienne Wooten | Democratic | 2007 | Incumbent resigned after being elected Hinds County circuit judge on November 27, 2018. New member elected March 12, 2019. Democratic hold. | ▌ ✓ Ronnie Crudup Jr. (Nonpartisan) 63.3%; ▌ Edelia Carthan (Nonpartisan) 24.6%; ▌ Stephanie Skipper (Nonpartisan) 12.1% |
| House | 101 | Brad Touchstone | Republican | 2015 | Incumbent resigned December 31, 2018, after being elected Lamar County circuit judge. New member elected April 2, 2019, after no one received over 50% of the vote on March 12, 2019. Republican hold. | ▌ ✓ Kent McCarty (Nonpartisan) 68.1%; ▌ Steven Utroska (Nonpartisan) 31.9% |

=== Missouri ===
Six special elections were held for the Missouri General Assembly in 2019. Democrats flipped one seat previously held by a Republican.

| District | | Incumbent | | | This race | |
| Chamber | No. | Representative | Party | First elected | Results | Candidates |
|---|---|---|---|---|---|---|
| House | 22 | Brandon Ellington | Democratic | 2012 | Incumbent resigned July 31, 2019, after being elected to the Kansas City, Missouri City Council. New member elected November 5, 2019. Democratic hold. | ▌ ✓ Yolanda Young (Democratic) 81.6%; ▌ Tammy Louise Herrera (Republican) 11.2%; ▌ Jeff Francis (Green) 7.1% |
| House | 36 | DaRon McGee | Democratic | 2015 (special) | Incumbent resigned April 29, 2019, following allegations of sexual harassment. New member elected November 5, 2019. Democratic hold. | ▌ ✓ Mark Sharp (Democratic) 74.2%; ▌ Nola Wood (write-in) 15.3%; ▌ Bob Vorhees (Green) 10.5% |
| House | 74 | Cora Walker | Democratic | 2016 | Incumbent resigned July 29, 2019, to work as a policy director for St. Louis County Executive Sam Page. New member elected November 5, 2019. Democratic hold. | ▌ ✓ Michael Person (Democratic) 57.3%; ▌ Nicholas Kasoff (Libertarian) 42.7% |
| House | 78 | Bruce Franks Jr. | Democratic | 2016 | Incumbent resigned July 31, 2019, citing mental health reasons. New member elected November 5, 2019. Democratic hold. | ▌ ✓ Rasheen Aldridge (Democratic) 99.3%; ▌ Mark Comfort (write-in) 0.7% |
| House | 99 | Jean Evans | Republican | 2016 | Incumbent resigned February 5, 2019, to become the executive director of the Missouri Republican Party. New member elected November 5, 2019. Democratic gain. | ▌ ✓ Trish Gunby (Democratic) 54.0%; ▌ Lee Ann Pitman (Republican) 46.0% |
| House | 158 | Scott Fitzpatrick | Republican | 2012 | Incumbent resigned January 14, 2019, after being appointed State Treasurer of Missouri by Governor Mike Parson. New member elected November 5, 2019. Republican hold. | ▌ ✓ Scott Cupps (Republican) 82.6%; ▌ Lisa Kalp (Democratic) 17.4% |

=== New Hampshire ===
One special election was held for the New Hampshire General Court in 2019.

| District | | Incumbent | | | This race | |
| Chamber | No. | Representative | Party | First elected | Results | Candidates |
|---|---|---|---|---|---|---|
| House | Rockingham 9 | Sean Morrison | Republican | 2014 | Incumbent resigned May 25–26, 2019, citing frustration with political conflicts and a desire to spend more time with family. New member elected October 8, 2019. Republican hold. | ▌ ✓ Michael Vose (Republican) 52.2%; ▌ Naomi Andrews (Democratic) 47.8% |

=== New Jersey ===
One special election was held for the New Jersey Legislature in 2019. Republicans flipped one seat previously held by a Democrat.

| District | | Incumbent | | | This race | |
| Chamber | No. | Representative | Party | First elected | Results | Candidates |
|---|---|---|---|---|---|---|
| Senate | 1 | Jeff Van Drew | Democratic | 2007 | Incumbent resigned January 1, 2019, after being elected to the United States House of Representatives. New member elected November 5, 2019. Republican gain. | ▌ ✓ Mike Testa (Republican) 53.4%; ▌ Bob Andrzejczak (Democratic) 46.6% (Note: Andrzejczak had been appointed to the seat on an interim basis on January 15, 2019.) |

=== New York ===
One special election was held for the New York State Legislature in 2019.

| District | | Incumbent | | | This race | |
| Chamber | No. | Representative | Party | First elected | Results | Candidates |
|---|---|---|---|---|---|---|
| Senate | 57 | Catharine Young | Republican | 2005 (special) | Incumbent resigned March 10, 2019, to become Executive Director for the Center of Excellence in Food and Agriculture at Cornell AgriTech. New member elected November 5, 2019. Republican hold. | ▌ ✓ George Borrello (Republican) 71.1%; ▌ Austin Morgan (Democratic) 28.9% |

=== Pennsylvania ===
Seven special elections were held for the Pennsylvania General Assembly in 2019. Democrats flipped one seat previously held by a Republican.

| District | | Incumbent | | | This race | |
| Chamber | No. | Representative | Party | First elected | Results | Candidates |
|---|---|---|---|---|---|---|
| House | 114 | Sid Michaels Kavulich | Democratic | 2010 | Incumbent died October 16, 2018, of complications due to heart surgery. New member elected March 12, 2019. Democratic hold. | ▌ ✓ Bridget Malloy Kosierowski (Democratic) 62.4%; ▌ Frank Scavo III (Republican) 37.6% |
| House | 190 | Vanessa L. Brown | Democratic | 2008 | Incumbent resigned December 11, 2018, after being convicted of bribery and conflict of interest. New member elected March 12, 2019. Democratic hold. | ▌ ✓ Movita Johnson-Harrell (Democratic) 66.6%; ▌ Amen Brown (Amen Brown) 20.0%; ▌ Pamela Williams (Working Families) 10.7%; ▌ Michael Harvey (Republican) 2.7% |
| Senate | 37 | Guy Reschenthaler | Republican | 2015 (special) | Incumbent resigned January 3, 2019, after being elected to the United States House of Representatives. New member elected April 2, 2019. Democratic gain. | ▌ ✓ Pam Iovino (Democratic) 52.0%; ▌ D. Raja (Republican) 48.0% |
| Senate | 33 | Richard Alloway | Republican | 2008 | Incumbent resigned February 28, 2019, citing political gridlock. New member elected May 21, 2019. Republican hold. | ▌ ✓ Doug Mastriano (Republican) 68.5%; ▌ Sarah Hammond (Democratic) 31.5% |
| Senate | 41 | Donald C. White | Republican | 2000 | Incumbent resigned February 28, 2019, citing health reasons. New member elected May 21, 2019. Republican hold. | ▌ ✓ Joe Pittman (Republican) 65.4%; ▌ Susan Boser (Democratic) 34.6% |
| House | 11 | Brian Ellis | Republican | 2004 | Incumbent resigned on March 18, 2019, after being accused of sexual assault. New member elected May 21, 2019. Republican hold. | ▌ ✓ Marci Mustello (Republican) 57.5%; ▌ Sam Doctor (Democratic) 42.5% |
| House | 85 | Fred Keller | Republican | 2010 | Incumbent resigned May 22, 2019, after being elected to the United States House of Representatives. New member elected August 20, 2019. Republican hold. | ▌ ✓ David H. Rowe (Republican) 62.6%; ▌ Jennifer Rager-Kay (Democratic) 37.4% |

=== Rhode Island ===
One special election was held for the Rhode Island General Assembly in 2019.

| District | | Incumbent | | | This race | |
| Chamber | No. | Representative | Party | First elected | Results | Candidates |
|---|---|---|---|---|---|---|
| House | 68 | Kenneth Marshall | Democratic | 2012 | Incumbent's term expired January 1, 2019. Representative-elect Laufton Ascencao withdrew prior to being seated after admitting to faking his campaign invoice. New member elected March 5, 2019. Democratic hold. | ▌ ✓ June S. Speakman (Democratic) 39.8%; ▌ William James Hunt, Jr. (Libertarian) 28.4%; ▌ Kenneth A. Marshall (independent) 23.6%; ▌ James R. McCanna, III (independent) 8.1% |

=== South Carolina ===
Four special elections were held for the South Carolina General Assembly in 2019.

| District | | Incumbent | | | This race | |
| Chamber | No. | Representative | Party | First elected | Results | Candidates |
|---|---|---|---|---|---|---|
| Senate | 6 | William Timmons | Republican | 2016 | Incumbent resigned November 9, 2018, after being elected to the United States House of Representatives. New member elected March 26, 2019. Republican hold. | ▌ ✓ Dwight Loftis (Republican) 55.6%; ▌ Tina Belge (Democratic) 44.3% |
| House | 14 | Michael Pitts | Republican | 2002 | Incumbent resigned January 3, 2019, citing health reasons. New member elected April 23, 2019. Republican hold. | ▌ ✓ Stewart Jones (Republican) 57.8%; ▌ Garrett McDaniel (Democratic) 42.1% |
| House | 19 | Dwight Loftis | Republican | 1996 (special) | Incumbent resigned March 27, 2019, after being elected to the South Carolina Senate. New member elected August 20, 2019. Republican hold. | ▌ ✓ Patrick Haddon (Republican) 61.0%; ▌ Carrie Counton (Democratic) 39.0% |
| House | 84 | Ronnie Young | Republican | 2017 (special) | Incumbent died May 19, 2019, of pancreatic cancer. New member elected October 1, 2019. Republican hold. | ▌ ✓ Melissa Lackey Oremus (Republican) 97.4%; ▌ Write-ins 2.6% |

=== Tennessee ===
Three special elections were held for the Tennessee General Assembly in 2019.

| District | | Incumbent | | | This race | |
| Chamber | No. | Representative | Party | First elected | Results | Candidates |
|---|---|---|---|---|---|---|
| Senate | 32 | Mark Norris | Republican | 2000 | Incumbent resigned November 1, 2018, after being appointed judge of the District Court for the Western District of Tennessee by President Donald Trump. New member elected March 12, 2019. Republican hold. | ▌ ✓ Paul Rose (Republican) 84.0%; ▌ Eric R. Coleman (Democratic) 16.0% |
| Senate | 22 | Mark Green | Republican | 2012 | Incumbent resigned January 2, 2019, after being elected to the United States House of Representatives. New member elected April 23, 2019. Republican hold. | ▌ ✓ Bill Powers (Republican) 53.6%; ▌ Juanita Charles (Democratic) 44.4%; ▌ Doyle Clark (independent) 1.3%; ▌ David L. Cutting (independent) 0.7% |
| House | 77 | Bill Sanderson | Republican | 2010 | Incumbent resigned July 24, 2019, for personal reasons. New member elected December 19, 2019. Republican hold. | ▌ ✓ Rusty Grills (Republican) 85.2%; ▌ Michael Smith (Democratic) 12.8%; ▌ Max Smith (independent) 1.0%; ▌ Ronnie Henley (independent) 0.5%; ▌ Billy M Jones (independent) 0.4% |

=== Texas ===
Three special elections were held for the Texas Legislature in 2019.

| District | | Incumbent | | | This race | |
| Chamber | No. | Representative | Party | First elected | Results | Candidates |
|---|---|---|---|---|---|---|
| Texas | 79 | Joe Pickett | Democratic | 1994 | Incumbent resigned January 4, 2019, citing health reasons. New member elected January 29, 2019. Democratic hold. | ▌ ✓ Art Fierro (Democratic) 53.3%; ▌ Michiel Noe (Democratic) 26.7%; ▌ Hans Sassenfeld (Republican) 20.0% |
| Texas | 145 | Carol Alvarado | Democratic | 2008 | Incumbent resigned December 21, 2018, after being was elected to the Texas Senate. New member elected March 5, 2019, after no one received over 50% of the vote on January 29, 2019. Democratic hold. | ▌ ✓ Christina Morales (Democratic) 60.8%; ▌ Melissa Noriega (Democratic) 39.2% |
| Texas | 125 | Justin Rodriguez | Democratic | 2012 | Incumbent resigned January 4, 2019, after being appointed to the Bexar County Commissioners Court. New member elected March 12, 2019, after no one received over 50% of the vote on February 12, 2019. Democratic hold. | ▌ ✓ Ray Lopez (Democratic) 58.4%; ▌ Fred A. Rangel (Republican) 41.6% |

=== Virginia ===
Two special elections were held for the Virginia General Assembly in 2019.

| District | | Incumbent | | | This race | |
| Chamber | No. | Representative | Party | First elected | Results | Candidates |
|---|---|---|---|---|---|---|
| Senate | 33 | Jennifer Wexton | Democratic | 2014 (special) | Incumbent resigned January 3, 2019, after being elected to the United States House of Representatives. New member elected January 8, 2019. Democratic hold. | ▌ ✓ Jennifer Boysko (Democratic) 69.8%; ▌ Joe T. May (Republican) 30.1% |
| House | 86 | Jennifer Boysko | Democratic | 2015 | Incumbent resigned January 11, 2019, after being elected to the Virginia Senate. New member elected February 19, 2019. Democratic hold. | ▌ ✓ Ibraheem Samirah (Democratic) 59.5%; ▌ Gregg G. Nelson (Republican) 34.4%; ▌ Connie H. Hutchinson (independent) 5.9% |

=== Washington ===
Two special elections were held for the Washington State Legislature in 2019.

| District | | Incumbent | | | This race | |
| Chamber | No. | Representative | Party | First elected | Results | Candidates |
|---|---|---|---|---|---|---|
| House | 13 Position 2 | Matt Manweller | Republican | 2012 | Incumbent resigned January 14, 2019, following accusations of sexual harassment. Interim appointee elected November 5, 2019. (Note: Alex Ybarra was appointed as interim representative by the Grant, Kittitas, Lincoln, and Yakima county commissions on January 14, 2019.); Republican hold. | ▌ ✓ Alex Ybarra (Republican) 74.4%; ▌ Steve Verhey (Democratic) 25.4% |
| Senate | 40 | Kevin Ranker | Democratic | 2008 | Incumbent resigned January 12, 2019, following accusations of sexual harassment. Interim appointee elected November 5, 2019. (Note: Liz Lovelett was appointed as interim senator by the Whatcom, San Juan, and Skagit county commissions on February 5, 2019.); Democratic hold. | ▌ ✓ Liz Lovelett (Democratic) 70.1%; ▌ Daniel Miller (Republican) 29.8% |

=== Wisconsin ===
One special election was held for the Wisconsin Legislature in 2019.

| District | | Incumbent | | | This race | |
| Chamber | No. | Representative | Party | First elected | Results | Candidates |
|---|---|---|---|---|---|---|
| Assembly | 64 | Peter Barca | Democratic | 2010 | Incumbent resigned January 7, 2019, after being appointed Secretary of the Wisconsin Department of Revenue by Governor Tony Evers. New member elected April 30, 2019. Democratic hold. | ▌ ✓ Tip McGuire (Democratic) 62.4%; ▌ Mark Stalker (Republican) 37.6% |

== See also ==
- 2019 United States gubernatorial elections
