= 2019 Georgia state elections =

2019 Georgia elections
- November 5, 2019

== State legislative special elections ==
Republicans retained all five seats in special elections.

=== House District 5 ===
A special election was held on January 8 for House District 5, following the death of John D. Meadows III (R) on November 18, 2018. Five Republicans and one Democrat filed for the seat. Republicans Matt Barton and Jesse Vaugh advanced to the February 5 runoff, which Barton won.

=== District 176: February 12 ===
A special election was held on February 12 for House District 176 following the appointment of Jason Shaw (R) was appointed to serve the remainder of H. Doug Everett's term on the Georgia Public Service Commission effective January 1, 2019. Two Republicans and two Democrats filed for the seat. Republicans James Burchett and Franklin Patten advanced to the March 12 runoff, which Burchett won with 59.3%.

=== District 28 ===
A special election was held on April 9 for House District 28. It was the third election between Republicans Chris Erwin and Dan Gasaway, as the results of the May 22, 2018 for the district were deemed inconclusive due to ballot errors. A re-vote in the primary was held on December 4, 2018, but was again voided by a judge due to ballot errors. A final re-vote, held as a special election, was held on April 9, 2019, which Erwin won.

=== District 71 ===
A special election was held on September 3 for House District 71 after David Stover resigned effective June 25. Three Republicans and one Democrat filed for the seat. Republicans Philip Singleton and Marcy Sakrison advanced to the October 1 runoff, which Singleton won.

=== District 152 ===
A special election was held on November 5 for House District 152 after Ed Rynders (R) resigned his seat on September 5. Three Republicans and one Democrat filed for the seat. Republicans Bill Yearta and Jim Quinn advanced to the December 3 runoff, which Yearta won.

== Local ==
- 2019 Savannah mayoral election
