= Connecticut's 130th House of Representatives district =

American legislative district

Connecticut's 130th State House of Representatives district
Representative
| Antonio Felipe; D |

Connecticut's 130th House of Representatives district elects one member of the Connecticut House of Representatives. It encompasses parts of Bridgeport and has been represented by Democrat Antonio Felipe since 2019.

== List of representatives ==
List of representatives from Connecticut's 130th State House district
| Representative | Party | Years | District home | Note |
|---|---|---|---|---|
| Charles W. Mizak | Democratic | 1967–1969 | Bridgeport | Seat created |
| Lawrence J. Merly | Democratic | 1969–1971 | Bridgeport | |
| David J. Sullivan Jr. | Republican | 1971–1973 | Bridgeport | |
| Ernest L. Nickols | Republican | 1973–1975 | Bridgeport | |
| Terry McGovern | Democratic | 1975–1977 | Bridgeport | |
| Edward J. Petrovick | Democratic | 1977–1981 | Bridgeport | |
| Frances Freer | Republican | 1981–1983 | Bridgeport | |
| Jose C. Lugo | Democratic | 1983–1989 | Bridgeport | |
| Americo Santiago | Democratic | 1989–1997 | Bridgeport | |
| Héctor A. Díaz | Democratic | 1997–2001 | Bridgeport | |
| Felipe Reinoso | Democratic | 2001–2009 | Bridgeport | |
| Ezequiel Santiago | Democratic | 2009–2019 | Bridgeport | Died in office |
| Antonio Felipe | Democratic | 2019– | Bridgeport | Elected in special election |

== Recent elections ==
=== 2020 ===
2020 Connecticut State House of Representatives election, District 130
| Party | Candidate | Votes | % |
|---|---|---|---|
| Democratic | Antonio Felipe (incumbent) | 4,490 | 85.36 |
| Republican | Terrence A. Sullivan | 770 | 14.64 |
| Total votes | | 5,260 | 100.00 |
| Democratic hold | | | |

=== 2019 special ===
2019 Connecticut House of Representatives special elections, District 130
| Party | Candidate | Votes | % |
|---|---|---|---|
| Democratic | Antonio Felipe | 466 | 47.2 |
| Nonpartisan (Write-In) | Kate Rivera | 343 | 34.9 |
| Nonpartisan (Write-In) | Christina Ayala | 72 | 7.3 |
| Nonpartisan (Write-In) | Hector A. Diaz | 67 | 6.8 |
| Republican | Joshua Parrow | 39 | 4.0 |
| Total votes | | 987 | 100.00 |
| Democratic hold | | | |

=== 2018 ===
2018 Connecticut House of Representatives election, District 130
| Party | Candidate | Votes | % |
|---|---|---|---|
| Democratic | Ezequiel Santiago (Incumbent) | 3,202 | 89.8 |
| Republican | Terry Sullivan | 362 | 10.2 |
| Total votes | | 3,564 | 100.00 |
| Democratic hold | | | |

=== 2016 ===
2016 Connecticut House of Representatives election, District 130
| Party | Candidate | Votes | % |
|---|---|---|---|
| Democratic | Ezequiel Santiago (Incumbent) | 4,032 | 87.9 |
| Republican | Melissa Borres | 555 | 12.1 |
| Total votes | | 4,587 | 100.00 |
| Democratic hold | | | |

=== 2014 ===
2014 Connecticut House of Representatives election, District 130
| Party | Candidate | Votes | % |
|---|---|---|---|
| Democratic | Ezequiel Santiago (Incumbent) | 1,972 | 83 |
| Republican | David S. Goodman | 308 | 13 |
| Peace and Progress | Joel Gonzalez | 95 | 4 |
| Total votes | | 2,375 | 100.00 |
| Democratic hold | | | |

=== 2012 ===
2012 Connecticut House of Representatives election, District 130
| Party | Candidate | Votes | % |
|---|---|---|---|
| Democratic | Ezequiel Santiago (Incumbent) | 4,098 | 90.5 |
| Republican | John Iannuzzi | 431 | 9.5 |
| Total votes | | 4,529 | 100.00 |
| Democratic hold | | | |
