= Felipe Reinoso =

Peruvian-American politician

Member of the Connecticut House of Representatives from the 130th district
- In office 2001–2009
- Preceded by: Héctor A. Díaz
- Succeeded by: Ezequiel Santiago

Personal details
- Born: 1950 (age 75–76) Arequipa, Peru
- Party: Democratic Party; Popular Force
- Parents: Cirilo Reinoso (father); Angelica Cervantes Reinoso (mother)
- Education: Sacred Heart University; Fairfield University; John F. Kennedy School of Government
- Profession: Teacher

Felipe Reinoso Cervantes (born c. 1950) is a Peruvian-American politician. He was a member of the Connecticut House of Representatives between 2001 and 2009. In 2016, he unsuccessfully contested a seat in the Congress of the Republic of Peru.

== Early life, education, and career ==
Reinoso was born in Arequipa, Peru, one of five sons to parents Cirilo Reinoso and Angelica Cervantes Reinoso. He lived in Peru for nineteen years, before he and his family immigrated to the United States in 1969, settling in Bridgeport, Connecticut. He earned a bachelor's degree at Sacred Heart University in 1984, followed by a master's degree from Fairfield University in 1987.

Reinoso taught social studies in two languages at Warren Harding High School for fourteen years. Starting in 1989, he served as founding director of the Saturday Hispanic Academy in Science at Sacred Heart University. In 1998, Rachel Allison, Tim Dutton, and Reinoso established in Bridgeport the Bridge Academy High School, a charter high school. Reinoso served as the institution's principal at least through 2006. In 2005, Reinoso completed a master's degree in public administration at the John F. Kennedy School of Government.

== Political career ==
In the 1970s, Reinoso joined the Puerto Rican Democratic Club. He later worked for politician Americo Santiago. Reinoso contested his first state legislative election in 1995, seeking Santiago's open seat, but was not elected to the Connecticut House of Representatives, losing to Héctor A. Díaz. Reinoso first won election as a representative of state house district 130 in November 2000, unseating Díaz. Upon taking office, Reinoso became the first Peruvian-American to be seated in any U.S. state legislature.

During his third state legislative term in 2004, Reinoso worked to pass a bill that allowed undocumented immigrants to attend Connecticut universities at the in-state tuition rate if they had received at least two years of schooling in Connecticut and graduated from a secondary school or equivalent. The bill was voted down in 2005, and Reinoso tried to propose similar bills for discussion in 2007 and 2008. In 2005, Reinoso introduced a bill permitting non-U.S citizens living in Connecticut to obtain a drivers' license. In 2005, Reinoso considered running for Ernie Newton's Connecticut Senate seat. Instead, Reinoso remained on the Connecticut House of Representatives, from which he stepped down in 2009 and was succeeded in office by Ezequiel Santiago.

Subsequently, Reinoso returned to Peru, settling in Lima. In February 2016, he was named a replacement legislative candidate for Moisés Mieses. Reinoso represented the Popular Force in the 2016 general elections for a seat on the Congress of the Republic of Peru to represent Lima and residents abroad. He was not among the 14 representatives elected, having received the fewest votes from among the 36 candidates.
