= Randy Asbury =

American politician

Member of the Missouri House of Representatives from the 22nd district
- In office January 2011 – January 2013
- Preceded by: Therese Sander
- Succeeded by: Brandon Ellington

Personal details
- Born: October 4, 1958 (age 67) Fayette, Missouri, U.S.
- Party: Republican
- Spouse: Connie Asbury
- Education: University of Missouri, Columbia

Randy Asbury (born October 4, 1958) is a Republican former member of the Missouri House of Representatives. Asbury represents the 22nd District, encompassing all or parts of Chariton, Macon, and Radolph counties. He was first elected to the Missouri House in 2010.

== Personal history ==
Randy Asbury was born and raised in Fayette, Missouri. After graduation from Fayette High School in 1976, he attended the University of Missouri, earning a Bachelor of Science-Agriculture degree in 1980. Among his jobs prior to becoming state representative were co-owner and president of the farm supply business Soil Technologies of Missouri. He has also worked for the Missouri Pork Producers Association and Soaring Eagles Ministries, a ministry for homeless persons. Randy Asbury is a former deputy director for the Missouri Department of Agriculture as well. Asbury is the current executive director for the Coalition to Protect the Missouri River (CPR). He and wife Connie are the parents of four children.

== Political history ==
Randy Asbury ran as a Republican candidate for Governor of Missouri in the 2016 election. In 2000, Randy Asbury was a candidate for the 19th District seat in the Missouri Senate, defeating fellow Republicans Frank A. Martin and G.W. Parker Jr. in the August primary, but losing to Democrat Ken Jacob by a wide margin in the November general election. Missouri Governor Matt Blunt appointed Randy Asbury to finish an unexpired term on the Randolph County Commission. Asbury ran for the 22nd District Missouri State Representative seat in 2010 beating Tim Remole and Doug Farnen in the Republican primary, then defeating Doug Galaske in the November general election to succeed the term-limited Therese Sander.

Missouri 19th District State Senate Election 2000
Party	Candidate	Votes	%	±%
Republican	Randy Asbury	29,152	40.6	
Democratic	Ken Jacobs	41,426	57.6	Winner
Libertarian	John Dupuy	1,293	1.8	

Missouri 22nd District State Representative Election 2010
Party	Candidate	Votes	%	±%
Republican	Randy Asbury	7,813	69.8	Winner
Democratic	Doug Galaske	3,380	30.2	

=== Legislative assignments ===
Rep. Asbury will serve on the following commissions during the 96th General Assembly:

- Appropriations - Agriculture and Natural Resources subcommittee
- Budget
- Vice-Chairman, Emerging Issues in Animal Agriculture
- Local Government
