= Louisiana's 62nd House of Representatives district =

American legislative district

Louisiana's 62nd State House of Representatives district
Representative
Roy Daryl Adams; D–Jackson

Louisiana's 62nd House of Representatives district is one of 105 Louisiana House of Representatives districts. It is currently represented by Democrat Roy Daryl Adams of Jackson, who was originally elected as an independent, switching his party allegiance in April 2023 and being re-elected under that classification in the same year.

== Geography ==
HD62 includes the towns of Clinton, Jackson, Slaughter, and the villages of Norwood, and Wilson. Additionally, the district includes parts of the cities of Baker, and Zachary.

== Election results ==
Year	Winning candidate	Party	Percent	Opponent	Party	Percent	Opponent	Party	Percent
2011	Kenny Havard	Republican	61.4%	Ken Dawson	Democratic	38.6%			
2015	Kenny Havard	Republican	63.4%	Ronnie Jett	Democratic	36.6%			
2019 - Special	Roy Adams	Independent	53.6%	Dennis Aucoin	Republican	46.4%			
2019	Roy Adams	Independent	53.3%	Johnny Arceneaux	Republican	46.4%			
2023	Roy Adams	Democratic	51%	Dadrius Lanus	Democratic	28.7%	Daniel Banguel	Democratic	20.4%
