= Louisiana's 18th House of Representatives district =

American legislative district

Louisiana's 18th State House of Representatives district
Representative
Jeremy LaCombe; R–Livonia

Louisiana's 18th House of Representatives district is one of 105 Louisiana House of Representatives districts. It is currently represented by Republican, and former Democrat Jeremy LaCombe of Livonia.

== Geography ==
HD18 includes the towns of Krotz Springs, Livonia, Melville and Simmesport.

== Election results ==
Year	Winning candidate	Party	Percent	Opponent	Party	Percent
2011	Major Thibaut	Democratic	100%			
2015	Major Thibaut	Democratic	100%			
2019 - Special	Jeremy LaCombe	Democratic	68.5%	Tammi Fabre	Republican	36.8%
2019	Jeremy LaCombe	Democratic	62.5%	Brandon Bergeron	Republican	37.5%
2023	Jeremy LaCombe	Republican	55.4%	Tammi Fabre	Republican	44.6%
