= Brent Cox =

American politician

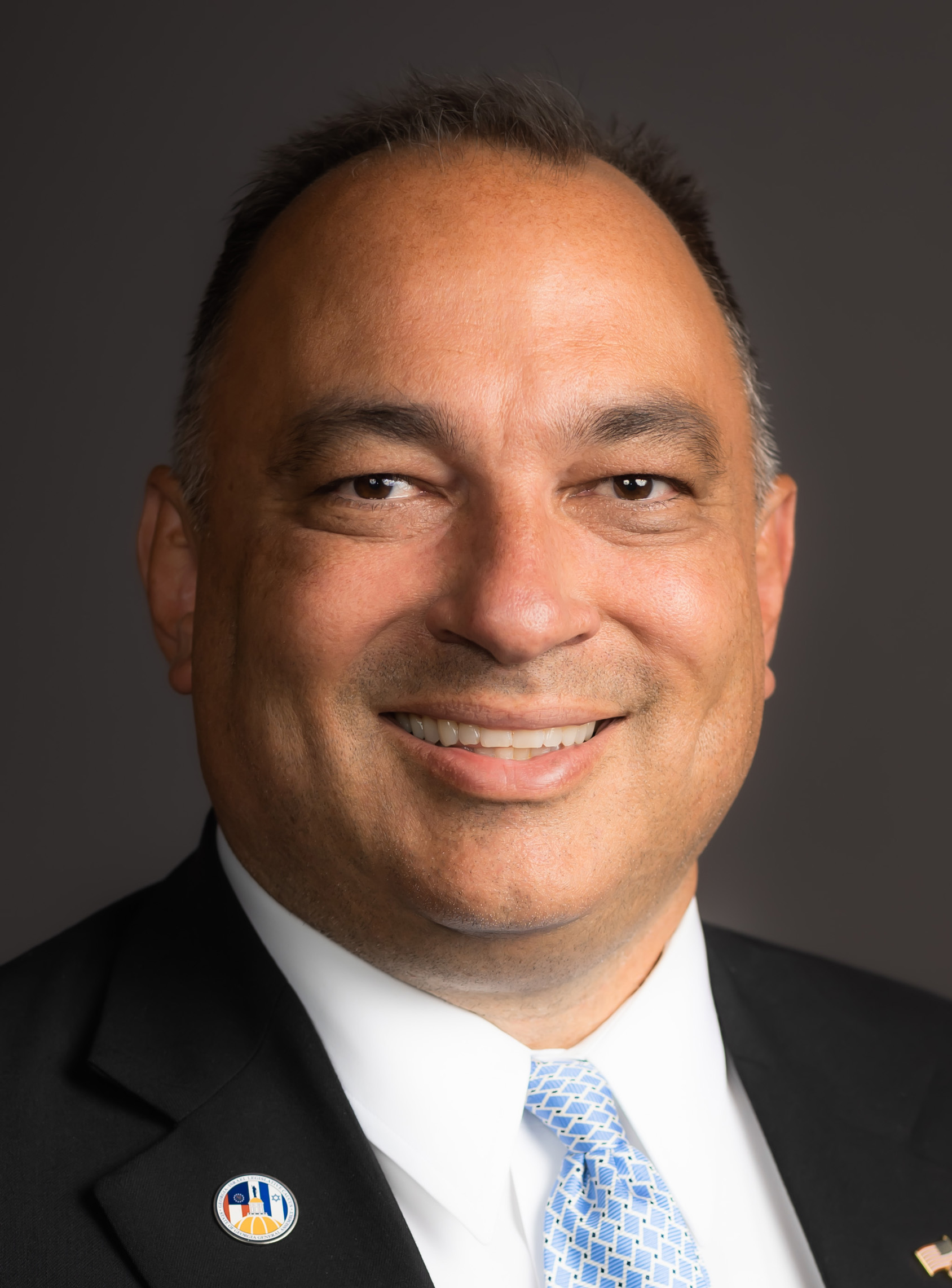

Member of the Georgia House of Representatives from the 28th district
- Incumbent
- Assumed office January 9, 2023
- Preceded by: Chris Erwin (redistricting)

Personal details
- Party: Republican

Brent Lee Cox is an American politician who has been a member of the Georgia House of Representatives from the 28th district since 2022. Cox is a small business owner.
