= Frances Freer =

American politician

Member of the Connecticut House of Representatives from the 130th district
- In office 1981–1983
- Preceded by: Edward J. Petrovick
- Succeeded by: Jose C. Lugo

Personal details
- Born: Frances Ann Freer
- Party: Republican
- Spouse: Kenneth R. Tripp Jr. (m. 1983)
- Education: Providence College

Frances Ann Freer Tripp is an American politician who served in the Connecticut House of Representatives from 1981 to 1983, representing the 130th district as a Republican. Freer was a resident of Bridgeport during her tenure. She graduated from Providence College. On June 25, 1983, Freer married fellow former state representative Kenneth R. Tripp Jr.
