= Louisiana's 47th House of Representatives district =

American legislative district

Louisiana's 47th State House of Representatives district
Representative
Ryan Bourriaque; R–Abbeville

Louisiana's 47th House of Representatives district is one of 105 Louisiana House of Representatives districts. It is currently represented by Republican Ryan Bourriaque of Abbeville.

== Geography ==
HD47 includes the entirety of Cameron Parish. Additionally, the district includes a small part of the city of Lake Charles, as well a majority of the town of Lake Arthur.

== Election results ==
Year	Winning candidate	Party	Percent	Opponent	Party	Percent
2011	Bob Hensgens	Republican	100%			
2015	Bob Hensgens	Republican	100%			
2019 - Special	Ryan Bourriaque	Republican	63.5%	Ruben Rivera Jr.	Republican	36.5%
2019	Ryan Bourriaque	Republican	100%			
2023	Ryan Bourriaque	Republican	Cancelled			
