= Phillip Ensler =

American politician

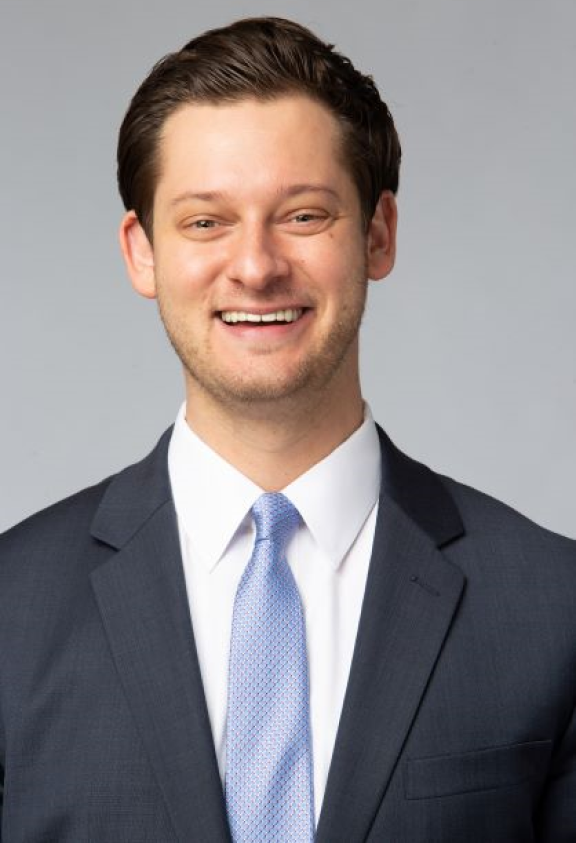

Member of the Alabama House of Representatives from the 74th district
- Incumbent
- Assumed office November 9, 2022
- Preceded by: Charlotte Meadows
- Succeeded by: Jasmyne Crimiel

Personal details
- Party: Democratic
- Education: George Washington University (BA); Yeshiva University (JD)

Phillip David Ensler is an American politician and attorney who has been a member of the Alabama House of Representatives since 2022, representing the 74th House district. He is a member of the Democratic Party. He is leaving the Alabama House in 2027.

== Education ==
Ensler earned a Juris Doctor degree from Yeshiva University in 2017. He previously earned a Bachelor of Arts in political science from George Washington University in 2012 and worked in the Obama administration while living in Washington, D.C.

== Career ==
Ensler was a public school educator in Montgomery through the Teach For America program. Since 2012, Ensler has worked a mentorship program that supports public school students in Alabama in achieving their college and career goals.

Ensler defeated incumbent Charlotte Meadows in the November 8, 2022, general election, receiving approximately 60 percent of the vote. His victory was the first time the Alabama Democratic Party flipped a seat in the state legislature since 2010.

In the legislature, he supported legislation that made glock switches a state crime. The bill was sponsored by Republican state senator Will Barfoot, and passed with bipartisan support.

In July 2025, he announced that he would not run for re-election, and would move to New York, his home state. Despite this, he announced in December 2025 that he would not move to New York, and instead announced his candidacy in the 2026 Alabama lieutenant gubernatorial election. He was encouraged by Doug Jones to enter the race.

== Personal life ==
Ensler is originally from New York, and moved to Alabama in 2012. He is Jewish, and as of 2022, he was the executive director of the Jewish federation of Central Alabama.
