= Jasmyne Crimiel =

American politician

Member of the Alabama House of Representatives from the 74th district
- Incumbent
- Assumed office November 3, 2026
- Preceded by: Phillip Ensler

Personal details
- Party: Democratic

Jasmyne Crimiel is an American politician. A member of the Democratic Party, she has served in the Alabama House of Representatives since 2026, representing the 74th district.
