= Kenneth Marshall (politician) =

Member of the Rhode Island House of Representatives

Member of the Rhode Island House of Representatives from the 68th district
- In office January 1, 2013 – January 1, 2019
- Preceded by: Richard Morrison
- Succeeded by: June Speakman

Personal details
- Born: January 4, 1968 (age 58)
- Party: Democratic
- Education: Bryant College

Kenneth A. Marshall (born January 4, 1968) is an American politician and a Democratic member of the Rhode Island House of Representatives representing District 68 since January 1, 2013.

== Education ==
Marshall earned his bachelor's degree from Bryant College (now Bryant University).

== Elections ==
- 2012 When District 68 Democratic Representative Richard Morrison left the Legislature and left the seat open, Marshall ran in the September 11, 2012 Democratic Primary, winning with 744 votes (62.8%) and won the November 6, 2012 General election with 4,101 votes (63.2%) against Republican nominee Michael Donohue.
