= Charlotte Meadows =

American politician

Member of the Alabama House of Representatives from the 74th district
- In office 2019 – November 9, 2022
- Preceded by: Dimitri Polizos
- Succeeded by: Phillip Ensler

Personal details
- Party: Republican
- Spouse: Allen Meadows
- Education: University of South Alabama (MBA)

Charlotte Meadows is an American politician. She served in the Alabama House of Representatives from 2019 to 2022 after running unsuccessfully in years 2013 and 2022.

== Political positions ==
Meadows filibustered and voted against a bill that legalized medical marijuana usage in Alabama. Meadows and a small group of other legislators spoke for nine hours in opposition to the bill–no attempt was made to cloture the members. In her speech, Meadows brought up the death of Rod Bramblett, who was killed in a car accident by a teenager who was under the influence.

== Electoral history ==
2019 Alabama House of Representatives special election, district 74
Primary election
Party	Candidate	Votes	%
Republican	Charlotte Meadows	1,220	44.0%
Republican	Michael Fritz	619	22.3%
Republican	Jesse Heifner	321	11.6%
Republican	Daniel Sparkman	307	11.1%
Republican	Tobias Grant	193	7.0%
Republican	Jay King	115	4.1%
Total votes		2,775	100.0
Runoff election
Republican	Charlotte Meadows	3,807	55.1%
Republican	Michael Fritz	3,105	44.9%
Total votes		6,912	100.0
General election
Republican	Charlotte Meadows	1,664	68.0%
Democratic	Rayford Mack	767	31.4%
Write-ins	Other	15	0.6%
Total votes		2,446	100.0

=== 2013 ===
2013 Alabama House of Representatives special election, district 74
Primary election
Party	Candidate	Votes	%
Republican	Dimitri Polizos	1,901	45.9%
Republican	Charlotte Meadows	1,328	32.1%
Republican	Heather Sellers	910	22.0%
Total votes		4,139	100.0
Runoff election
Republican	Dimitri Polizos	2,146	57.3%
Republican	Charlotte Meadows	1,601	42.7%
Total votes		3,747	100.0
