= 1994 Texas House of Representatives election =

- November 8, 1994

All 150 seats in the Texas House of Representatives 76 seats needed for a majority
	Majority party	Minority party
Leader	Pete Laney	Tom Craddick
Party	Democratic	Republican
Leader since	January 12, 1993	January 9, 1973
Leader's seat	85th	82nd
Last election	92	58
Seats before	91	59
Seats won	89	61
Seat change	▼2	▲2
Popular vote	1,696,616	1,797,719
Percentage	48.12%	50.99%
Swing	▼4.01%	▲5.74%
- Democratic hold Democratic gain Republican hold Republican gain Democratic: 50–60% 60–70% 70–80% 80–90% ≥90% Republican: 50–60% 60–70% 70–80% 80–90% ≥90%
Speaker before election
Pete Laney
Democratic
Elected Speaker
Pete Laney
Democratic

The 1994 Texas House of Representatives elections took place as part of the biennial United States elections. Texas voters elected state representatives in all 150 State House of Representatives districts. The winners of this election served in the 74th Texas Legislature. State representatives serve for two-year terms. Republicans gained a net of two seats from the Democrats, reducing the Democratic majority to 89 out of 150 seats.

== Background ==
Democrats had held control of the Texas House of Representatives since Reconstruction. In late 1993, Democrat Ric Williamson of the 61st district announced he would switch from the Democratic Party to the Republican Party.

== Redistricting ==
Democrats had fully controlled the redistricting process in 1991, and Republicans sued over the Texas House's map. The courts partially overhauled the map as a result of these lawsuits. Democrats codified the court's map into law in a January 1992 special session.

== Results ==
Despite Republicans making major gains nationwide as a part of the Republican Revolution, including Republican George W. Bush's victory against incumbent Democrat Ann Richards in the concurrent gubernatorial election, the party only flipped a net of two seats from the Democrats in the Texas House of Representatives.

=== Statewide ===
Summary of the November 8, 1994 Texas House of Representatives election results
Party	Candidates	Votes	%	Seats	+/–
Democratic Party	113	1,696,616	48.12%	89	▼2
Republican Party	88	1,797,719	50.99%	61	▲2
Libertarian Party	13	26,095	0.74%	0	–
Independent	2	4,612	0.13%	0	–
Write-in	3	634	0.02%	0	–
Total		3,525,676	100.00%	150	–

Popular vote
Republican	50.99%
Democratic	48.12%
Libertarian	0.74%
Independent	0.13%
Write-in	0.02%

House seats won
Democratic	59.33%
Republican	40.67%

=== Close races ===
1. District 58, 0.14%
2. District 105, 0.92%
3. District 57, 3.12% (gain)
4. District 24, 4.92%
5. District 4, 6.42%
6. District 23, 7.08%
7. District 89, 7.22%

=== Results by district ===
District	Democratic		Republican		Others		Total		Result
District	Votes	%	Votes	%	Votes	%	Votes	%	Result
District 1	22,036	100.00%	-	-	-	-	22,036	100.00%	Democratic hold
District 2	22,374	100.00%	-	-	-	-	22,374	100.00%	Democratic hold
District 3	17,577	59.90%	11,765	40.10%	-	-	29,342	100.00%	Democratic hold
District 4	16,935	53.21%	14,891	46.79%	-	-	31,826	100.00%	Democratic hold
District 5	17,371	58.39%	12,377	41.61%	-	-	29,748	100.00%	Democratic hold
District 6	11,142	31.33%	24,419	68.67%	-	-	35,561	100.00%	Republican hold
District 7	-	-	23,764	100.00%	-	-	23,764	100.00%	Republican hold
District 8	23,720	100.00%	-	-	-	-	23,720	100.00%	Democratic hold
District 9	22,184	100.00%	-	-	-	-	22,184	100.00%	Democratic hold
District 10	-	-	23,260	100.00%	-	-	23,260	100.00%	Republican hold
District 11	21,854	100.00%	-	-	-	-	21,854	100.00%	Democratic hold
District 12	24,491	100.00%	-	-	-	-	24,491	100.00%	Democratic hold
District 13	25,313	100.00%	-	-	-	-	25,313	100.00%	Democratic hold
District 14	-	-	21,325	100.00%	-	-	21,325	100.00%	Republican hold
District 15	-	-	28,504	100.00%	-	-	28,504	100.00%	Republican hold
District 16	-	-	25,078	87.13%	3,704	12.87%	28,782	100.00%	Republican hold
District 17	22,577	68.16%	10,547	31.84%	-	-	33,124	100.00%	Democratic hold
District 18	21,234	66.75%	10,577	33.25%	-	-	31,811	100.00%	Democratic hold
District 19	22,350	100.00%	-	-	-	-	22,350	100.00%	Democratic hold
District 20	21,727	100.00%	-	-	-	-	21,727	100.00%	Democratic hold
District 21	24,192	100.00%	-	-	-	-	24,192	100.00%	Democratic hold
District 22	18,869	100.00%	-	-	-	-	18,869	100.00%	Democratic hold
District 23	15,717	53.54%	13,638	46.46%	-	-	29,355	100.00%	Democratic hold
District 24	16,804	52.48%	15,215	47.52%	-	-	32,019	100.00%	Democratic hold
District 25	-	-	26,734	100.00%	-	-	26,734	100.00%	Republican hold
District 26	8,706	21.94%	30,973	78.06%	-	-	39,679	100.00%	Republican hold
District 27	14,937	100.00%	-	-	-	-	14,937	100.00%	Democratic hold
District 28	23,933	100.00%	-	-	-	-	23,933	100.00%	Democratic hold
District 29	17,947	100.00%	-	-	-	-	17,947	100.00%	Democratic hold
District 30	-	-	21,144	100.00%	-	-	21,144	100.00%	Republican hold
District 31	16,246	55.17%	13,199	44.83%	-	-	29,445	100.00%	Democratic hold
District 32	21,924	100.00%	-	-	-	-	21,924	100.00%	Democratic hold
District 33	14,949	59.81%	10,046	40.19%	-	-	24,995	100.00%	Democratic hold
District 34	14,272	100.00%	-	-	-	-	14,272	100.00%	Democratic hold
District 35	16,159	100.00%	-	-	-	-	16,159	100.00%	Democratic hold
District 36	9,794	100.00%	-	-	-	-	9,794	100.00%	Democratic hold
District 37	9,601	100.00%	-	-	-	-	9,601	100.00%	Democratic hold
District 38	10,261	100.00%	-	-	-	-	10,261	100.00%	Democratic hold
District 39	10,167	100.00%	-	-	-	-	10,167	100.00%	Democratic hold
District 40	9,065	55.34%	7,317	44.66%	-	-	16,382	100.00%	Democratic hold
District 41	10,119	100.00%	-	-	-	-	10,119	100.00%	Democratic hold
District 42	13,402	100.00%	-	-	-	-	13,402	100.00%	Democratic hold
District 43	15,072	61.79%	9,321	38.21%	-	-	24,393	100.00%	Democratic hold
District 44	21,443	100.00%	-	-	-	-	21,443	100.00%	Democratic hold
District 45	-	-	29,004	100.00%	-	-	29,004	100.00%	Republican hold
District 46	19,699	100.00%	-	-	-	-	19,699	100.00%	Democratic hold
District 47	-	-	45,869	100.00%	-	-	45,869	100.00%	Republican hold
District 48	27,927	64.63%	15,285	35.37%	-	-	43,212	100.00%	Democratic hold
District 49	24,988	63.53%	14,346	36.47%	-	-	39,334	100.00%	Democratic hold
District 50	20,868	72.08%	8,082	27.92%	-	-	28,950	100.00%	Democratic hold
District 51	18,113	68.77%	8,226	31.23%	-	-	26,339	100.00%	Democratic hold
District 52	14,141	36.12%	25,004	63.88%	-	-	39,145	100.00%	Republican hold
District 53	11,311	25.92%	32,325	74.08%	-	-	43,636	100.00%	Republican hold
District 54	14,998	100.00%	-	-	-	-	14,998	100.00%	Democratic hold
District 55	-	-	16,005	100.00%	-	-	16,005	100.00%	Republican hold
District 56	-	-	25,521	100.00%	-	-	25,521	100.00%	Republican hold
District 57	12,117	48.44%	12,896	51.56%	-	-	25,013	100.00%	Republican gain
District 58	16,544	49.93%	16,590	50.07%	-	-	33,134	100.00%	Republican hold
District 59	15,559	100.00%	-	-	-	-	15,559	100.00%	Democratic hold
District 60	25,064	100.00%	-	-	-	-	25,064	100.00%	Democratic hold
District 61	12,281	34.91%	22,898	65.09%	-	-	35,179	100.00%	Republican hold
District 62	19,445	100.00%	-	-	-	-	19,445	100.00%	Democratic hold
District 63	-	-	28,611	100.00%	-	-	28,611	100.00%	Republican hold
District 64	-	-	25,151	85.13%	4,392	14.87%	29,543	100.00%	Republican hold
District 65	9,141	32.37%	19,102	67.63%	0	0.00%	28,243	100.00%	Republican hold
District 66	-	-	35,978	100.00%	-	-	35,978	100.00%	Republican hold
District 67	-	-	28,653	87.90%	3,943	12.10%	32,596	100.00%	Republican hold
District 68	22,862	100.00%	-	-	-	-	22,862	100.00%	Democratic hold
District 69	20,359	100.00%	-	-	-	-	20,359	100.00%	Democratic hold
District 70	17,107	58.91%	11,931	41.09%	-	-	29,038	100.00%	Democratic hold
District 71	-	-	23,978	97.45%	628	2.55%	24,606	100.00%	Republican hold
District 72	22,495	100.00%	-	-	-	-	22,495	100.00%	Democratic hold
District 73	21,017	58.07%	14,507	40.08%	669	1.85%	36,193	100.00%	Democratic hold
District 74	14,178	62.12%	8,645	37.88%	-	-	22,823	100.00%	Democratic hold
District 75	10,865	100.00%	-	-	-	-	10,865	100.00%	Democratic hold
District 76	15,404	100.00%	-	-	-	-	15,404	100.00%	Democratic hold
District 77	10,859	100.00%	-	-	-	-	10,859	100.00%	Democratic hold
District 78	10,689	37.12%	18,110	62.88%	-	-	28,799	100.00%	Republican hold
District 79	11,707	100.00%	-	-	-	-	11,707	100.00%	Democratic gain
District 80	9,395	37.48%	15,671	62.52%	-	-	25,066	100.00%	Republican gain
District 81	-	-	19,163	100.00%	-	-	19,163	100.00%	Republican hold
District 82	-	-	26,034	100.00%	-	-	26,034	100.00%	Republican hold
District 83	8,516	43.17%	11,210	56.83%	-	-	19,726	100.00%	Republican hold
District 84	-	-	29,868	100.00%	-	-	29,868	100.00%	Republican hold
District 85	20,229	100.00%	-	-	-	-	20,229	100.00%	Democratic hold
District 86	-	-	29,249	100.00%	-	-	29,249	100.00%	Republican hold
District 87	-	-	18,859	100.00%	-	-	18,859	100.00%	Republican hold
District 88	24,750	100.00%	-	-	-	-	24,750	100.00%	Democratic hold
District 89	14,910	53.61%	12,903	46.39%	-	-	27,813	100.00%	Democratic hold
District 90	12,806	100.00%	-	-	-	-	12,806	100.00%	Democratic hold
District 91	11,175	33.77%	21,918	66.23%	-	-	33,093	100.00%	Republican hold
District 92	-	-	26,909	100.00%	-	-	26,909	100.00%	Republican hold
District 93	-	-	17,574	100.00%	-	-	17,574	100.00%	Republican hold
District 94	11,285	29.51%	26,960	70.49%	-	-	38,245	100.00%	Republican hold
District 95	21,845	100.00%	-	-	-	-	21,845	100.00%	Democratic hold
District 96	-	-	26,426	100.00%	-	-	26,426	100.00%	Republican hold
District 97	12,315	27.82%	31,957	72.18%	-	-	44,272	100.00%	Republican hold
District 98	-	-	30,688	100.00%	-	-	30,688	100.00%	Republican hold
District 99	-	-	28,986	100.00%	-	-	28,986	100.00%	Republican hold
District 100	13,405	89.20%	-	-	1,623	10.80%	15,028	100.00%	Democratic hold
District 101	8,528	30.96%	19,014	69.04%	-	-	27,542	100.00%	Republican hold
District 102	-	-	29,886	100.00%	-	-	29,886	100.00%	Republican hold
District 103	9,298	100.00%	-	-	-	-	9,298	100.00%	Democratic hold
District 104	7,541	100.00%	-	-	-	-	7,541	100.00%	Democratic hold
District 105	9,516	50.46%	9,343	49.54%	-	-	18,859	100.00%	Democratic hold
District 106	9,311	39.56%	13,779	58.55%	444	1.89%	23,534	100.00%	Republican hold
District 107	12,185	52.62%	10,219	44.13%	754	3.26%	23,158	100.00%	Democratic hold
District 108	-	-	36,372	91.85%	3,226	8.15%	39,598	100.00%	Republican hold
District 109	17,513	100.00%	-	-	-	-	17,513	100.00%	Democratic hold
District 110	21,645	100.00%	-	-	-	-	21,645	100.00%	Democratic hold
District 111	17,365	65.85%	9,004	34.15%	-	-	26,369	100.00%	Democratic hold
District 112	-	-	26,586	100.00%	-	-	26,586	100.00%	Republican hold
District 113	-	-	23,545	100.00%	-	-	23,545	100.00%	Republican hold
District 114	-	-	26,997	90.64%	2,789	9.36%	29,786	100.00%	Republican hold
District 115	12,761	100.00%	-	-	-	-	12,761	100.00%	Democratic hold
District 116	11,726	62.42%	7,060	37.58%	-	-	18,786	100.00%	Democratic hold
District 117	9,349	100.00%	-	-	-	-	9,349	100.00%	Democratic hold
District 118	10,933	70.49%	4,576	29.51%	-	-	15,509	100.00%	Democratic hold
District 119	13,409	100.00%	-	-	-	-	13,409	100.00%	Democratic hold
District 120	13,703	100.00%	-	-	-	-	13,703	100.00%	Democratic hold
District 121	9,278	27.99%	23,874	72.01%	-	-	33,152	100.00%	Republican hold
District 122	6,332	18.26%	28,344	81.74%	-	-	34,676	100.00%	Republican hold
District 123	-	-	28,849	100.00%	-	-	28,849	100.00%	Republican hold
District 124	13,004	100.00%	-	-	-	-	13,004	100.00%	Democratic hold
District 125	10,825	59.36%	7,411	40.64%	-	-	18,236	100.00%	Democratic hold
District 126	-	-	30,834	100.00%	-	-	30,834	100.00%	Republican hold
District 127	7,637	21.24%	28,327	78.76%	-	-	35,964	100.00%	Republican hold
District 128	12,064	100.00%	-	-	-	-	12,064	100.00%	Democratic hold
District 129	8,053	23.90%	24,914	73.94%	730	2.17%	33,697	100.00%	Republican hold
District 130	6,156	18.27%	27,539	81.73%	-	-	33,695	100.00%	Republican hold
District 131	15,339	100.00%	-	-	-	-	15,339	100.00%	Democratic hold
District 132	18,541	100.00%	-	-	-	-	18,541	100.00%	Democratic hold
District 133	6,803	19.76%	27,625	80.24%	-	-	34,428	100.00%	Republican hold
District 134	7,070	30.59%	15,536	67.21%	509	2.20%	23,115	100.00%	Republican gain
District 135	-	-	25,985	92.08%	2,236	7.92%	28,221	100.00%	Republican hold
District 136	-	-	31,316	91.94%	2,747	8.06%	34,063	100.00%	Republican hold
District 137	14,959	85.63%	-	-	2,510	14.37%	17,469	100.00%	Democratic hold
District 138	12,021	55.65%	9,144	42.33%	437	2.02%	21,602	100.00%	Democratic hold
District 139	11,944	100.00%	-	-	-	-	11,944	100.00%	Democratic hold
District 140	8,252	100.00%	-	-	-	-	8,252	100.00%	Democratic hold
District 141	16,604	100.00%	-	-	-	-	16,604	100.00%	Democratic hold
District 142	15,530	100.00%	-	-	-	-	15,530	100.00%	Democratic hold
District 143	9,389	100.00%	-	-	-	-	9,389	100.00%	Democratic hold
District 144	6,901	39.35%	10,638	60.65%	-	-	17,539	100.00%	Republican hold
District 145	7,764	100.00%	-	-	-	-	7,764	100.00%	Democratic hold
District 146	18,072	71.34%	7,259	28.66%	-	-	25,331	100.00%	Democratic hold
District 147	13,721	100.00%	-	-	-	-	13,721	100.00%	Democratic hold
District 148	8,741	100.00%	-	-	-	-	8,741	100.00%	Democratic hold
District 149	-	-	14,015	100.00%	-	-	14,015	100.00%	Republican hold
District 150	-	-	24,542	100.00%	-	-	24,542	100.00%	Republican hold
Total	1,696,616	48.12%	1,797,719	50.99%	31,341	0.89%	3,525,676	100.00%	
