= Therese Sander =

American politician and farmer from Missouri (born 1948)

Therese Sander (born November 22, 1948) is an American farmer in Missouri and a former Republican member of the Missouri House of Representatives.

She was born in Columbia, Missouri, and graduated magna cum laude from the University of Missouri–St. Louis. She is married and has four adult daughters.

Sander was appointed to the Missouri Rural Economic Development Council and to the Council of State Governments' Agriculture and Rural Policy Task Force for 2003–2004 and again for 2005–2006.

She was first elected to the Missouri House of Representatives in 2002, winning reelection in 2004, 2006. and 2008. By Missouri law she was term limited from running again in 2010.
