= Georgia's 5th House of Representatives district =

State district in Georgia, USA

Georgia's 5th State House of Representatives district
Representative
Matt Barton; R–Calhoun
- Demographics: 77.0% White; 3.6% Black; 16.8% Hispanic; 1.1% Asian
- Population: 54,403

District 5 elects one member of the Georgia House of Representatives. It contains parts of Floyd County and Gordon County.

== Members ==
- Craig Brock (until 2004)
- John Meadows III (2004–2018)
- Matt Barton (since 2019)
