= Dan Gasaway =

American politician

Member of the Georgia House of Representatives from the 28th district
- In office January 14, 2013 – January 14, 2019
- Preceded by: Michael Harden
- Succeeded by: Chris Erwin

Personal details
- Born: August 6, 1966 (age 59)
- Party: Republican

Dan Gasaway (born August 6, 1966) is an American politician who served in the Georgia House of Representatives from the 28th district from 2013 to 2019.
