= Brandon Ellington =

American politician

Member of the Kansas City, Missouri City Council from the 3rd district
- In office August 1, 2019 – August 1, 2023

Member of the Missouri House of Representatives from the 22nd district
- In office January 9, 2013 – July 31, 2019
- Preceded by: Randy Asbury
- Succeeded by: Yolanda Young (Missouri politician)

Member of the Missouri House of Representatives from the 41st district
- In office January 4, 2012 – January 9, 2013
- Preceded by: Kiki Curls
- Succeeded by: Ed Schieffer

Personal details
- Born: November 18, 1980 (age 45) Kansas City, Missouri, U.S.
- Party: Democratic

Brandon Ellington (born November 18, 1980) is an American politician who served in the Missouri House of Representatives from 2012 to 2019. His tenure there was reportedly summarized as having focused "on revamping the state's criminal justice system, promoting economic development, and advocating for equal rights" against challenges by the Republican-dominated legislature.

On July 31, 2019 he resigned ahead of his impending term limit, to serve on the Kansas City, Missouri City Council as the Third District at Large Councilmember. In City Council, he was on the Neighborhood, Planning, and Development Committee and was Vice-Chair of the Special Committee on Housing Policy.

== Personal life ==
Ellington graduated from Paseo High School in 1999, and went to MCC-Penn Valley and the University of Missouri-Kansas City.

He is married to Natasha Ellington and they share three children. They live in Kansas City, Missouri.
