= Dimitri Polizos =

American politician (1950–2019)

Member of the Alabama House of Representatives from the 74th district
- In office November 2013 – March 27, 2019
- Preceded by: Jay Love
- Succeeded by: Charlotte Meadows

Personal details
- Born: Dimitrios Gus Polizos; August 14, 1950 Montgomery, Alabama, U.S.
- Died: March 27, 2019 (aged 68) Montgomery, Alabama, U.S.
- Party: Republican
- Spouse: Dorothy Ann Gibbons Caver
- Children: 3
- Relatives: Vic Polizos (cousin)

Dimitrios Gus Polizos (August 14, 1950 – March 27, 2019) was an American politician. He was a member of the Alabama House of Representatives from the 74th District, serving from November 2013 until his death. He served on the Montgomery County commission and was a member of the Republican party.

Polizos went to Troy University. He was the owner of a restaurant in Montgomery. Polizos died following a heart attack in 2019, while still in office.
