= Antonio Felipe =

American politician (born 1996)

Tone Felipe

Member of the Connecticut House of Representatives from the 130th district
- Incumbent
- Assumed office May 13, 2019
- Preceded by: Ezequiel Santiago

Personal details
- Born: Antonio Dario Felipe; February 2, 1996 (age 30) Bridgeport, Connecticut, U.S.
- Party: Democratic
- Education: Housatonic Community College (AS)

Antonio Dario "Tone" Felipe (born February 2, 1996) is an American politician. He was first elected to the Connecticut House of Representatives in a 2019 special election.

Felipe was born in Bridgeport, Connecticut, to parents Ruben Felipe and Stephanie Cuomo, the oldest of five Children. He is of Puerto Rican, Italian, Dominican and Irish descent. Felipe's father worked as deputy chief of staff for Bill Finch during Finch's term as mayor of Bridgeport His great grandfather, Eustaquio Ramos, served as the Mayor of Las Marias Puerto Rico from 1949-1964. Felipe managed the political campaigns of state representative Christopher Rosario, who subsequently served as Deputy Speaker and became the longest-serving Representative in the 128th District's history and city councillor Maria Viggiano among other local races. He also served as a field coordinator for former State Senator Andres Ayala and former Mayor Bill Finch. Felipe was the youngest field coordinator in Connecticut for former Governor Dannel Malloy in 2014, running the Bridgeport field team at age 18. His other campaign work includes taking on roles in support of Congressman Jim Himes, Senator Chris Murphy and Governor Ned Lamont. Felipe now works as Manager of Community Partnerships at the University of Bridgeport in addition to his legislative work.

Felipe first ran for office at age 23 in a special election to replace Ezequiel Santiago, who died while in office in 2019. He defeated Republican Party candidate Joshua Parrow and three Democratic Party candidates, among them former state legislators Héctor A. Díaz and Christina Ayala, as well as Kate Rivera. Felipe was the youngest candidate in the special election, and drew criticism for having to move back to Bridgeport to contest the election despite having lived there the first 22 years of his life, as he and his family had relocated to Stratford one year prior. Felipe assumed office on May 13, 2019. Felipe is the youngest person in Connecticut's history to be named to House Leadership, becoming a Deputy Majority Leader in January 2020 at age 24. As with Dennis Bradley in the State Senate, he is the first person of Dominican ancestry to be elected to the Connecticut House of Representatives.

Felipe currently serves on the Appropriations Committee (Subcommittee Chair on Education), Education Committee, Environment Committee and is the House Chair of the Housing Committee. In 2022 he was elected as Vice Chair of Connecticut's Black and Puerto Rican Caucus, the youngest person to hold that position, alongside Chairwoman Patricia Billie Miller (D-Stamford). He has won several awards including the Champion Award from Southwest Community Health Center, The Ezequiel Santiago Hispanic Champion for Justice Award and was named to the Connecticut Afro-Latino 30 under 30.

Felipe faced Kelvin Ayala in the 2020 Democratic Party primary for the 130th house district seat. In the 2020 general election, he won re-election against Republican candidate Terry Sullivan. Felipe ran unopposed in the 2022 primary election cycle. He faced and again defeated Terry Sullivan, now on the ballot as Terry "Cowboy" Sullivan, in November 2022. He is currently the endorsed Democratic candidate seeking his 4th term in Connecticut's State House.
