= Yolanda Young (politician) =

American politician

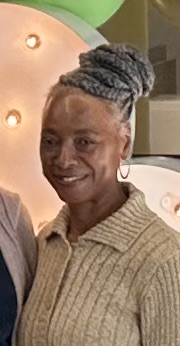

Member of the Missouri House of Representatives from the 22nd district
- Incumbent
- Assumed office November 5, 2019
- Preceded by: Brandon Ellington

Personal details
- Party: Democratic

Yolanda Young is a Missouri politician serving as a member of the Missouri House of Representatives from the 22nd district since 2019. She succeeded fellow Democrat Brandon Ellington in the 2019 special election after Ellington was elected to be a member of the Kansas City City Council.

== Missouri House of Representatives ==
=== Committee assignments ===
- Agriculture Policy
- Special Committee on Aging
- Special Committee on Criminal Justice
- Special Committee on Disease Control and Prevention

=== Electoral history ===
2019 Missouri House of Representatives District 22 General Election
Party	Candidate	Votes	%	±%
Democratic	Yolanda Young	2,360	81.63%	
Republican	Tammy Louise Herrera	325	11.24%	
Green	Jeff Francis	206	7.13%	
Total votes		2,891	100.00%	

Missouri House of Representatives Primary Election, August 4, 2020, District 22
Party	Candidate	Votes	%	±%
Democratic	Yolanda Young	2,836	67.62%	
Democratic	Kevon Graves	647	15.43%	
Democratic	Jeff Francis	317	7.56%	
Democratic	Bryce Bradford	258	6.15%	
Democratic	Sheoni Givens	136	3.24%	
Total votes		4,194	100.00%	

Missouri House of Representatives Election, November 3, 2020, District 22
Party	Candidate	Votes	%	±%
Democratic	Yolanda Young	11,757	100.00%	+32.38
Total votes		11,757	100.00%	

Missouri House of Representatives Primary Election, August 2, 2022, District 22
Party	Candidate	Votes	%	±%
Democratic	Yolanda Young	2,280	79.92%	+12.30
Democratic	Kevon Graves	390	13.67%	−1.76
Democratic	Davitta L. Hanson	183	6.41%	n/a
Total votes		2,853	100.00%	

Missouri House of Representatives Election, November 8, 2022, District 22
Party	Candidate	Votes	%	±%
Democratic	Yolanda Young	6,739	100.00%	0.00
Total votes		6,739	100.00%	
