= Georgia's 152nd House of Representatives district =

State district in Georgia, USA

Georgia's 152nd State House of Representatives district
Representative
Bill Yearta; R–Sylvester
- Demographics: 69.3% White; 24.8% Black; 2.8% Hispanic; 1.5% Asian
- Population: 54,287

District 152 elects one member of the Georgia House of Representatives. It contains the entirety of Lee County and Worth County, as well as parts of Dougherty County.

== Members ==
- Anne Mueller (until 2005)
- Ed Rynders (2005–2019)
- Bill Yearta (since 2019)
