= Georgia's 28th House of Representatives district =

State district in Georgia, USA

Georgia's 28th State House of Representatives district
Representative
Brent Cox; R–Dawsonville
- Demographics: 83.3% White; 7.2% Black; 6.4% Hispanic; 1.3% Asian
- Population: 53,137

District 28 elects one member of the Georgia House of Representatives. It contains parts of Forsyth County and Hall County.

== Members ==
- Dan Gasaway (2013–2019)
- Chris Erwin (2019–2023)
- Brent Cox (since 2023)
