= Kenny Havard =

American politician (born 1971)

Kenny Harvard

President of the West Feliciana Parish
- Incumbent
- Assumed office 2019
- Preceded by: Kevin Couhig

Member of the Louisiana House of Representatives from the 62 district
- In office January 9, 2012 – December 2018
- Preceded by: Tom McVea
- Succeeded by: Roy Adams

Personal details
- Born: Kenneth Edward Havard; March 10, 1971 (age 55)
- Party: Republican
- Education: ITI Technical College; Louisiana State University

Kenneth Edward Havard, known as Kenny Havard (born March 10, 1971), is an American politician and businessman serving as the president of West Feliciana Parish. A Republican, he previously served as a member of the Louisiana House of Representatives from the 62nd district, which encompasses most of East and West Feliciana parishes and the northwest corner of East Baton Rouge Parish, including the city of Zachary.

== Early life and education ==
A graduate of Jackson High School in Jackson, Louisiana, Havard attended ITI Technical College and Louisiana State University, both in Baton Rouge, to study industrial instrumentation and design.

== Career ==
Prior to his election, he had worked for eighteen years as a manager of engineering sales and a business development executive in the petrochemical, oil, and natural gas industries. Havard vowed in his campaign announcement to work to "create new jobs ... streamline government and rescind current regulation that create barriers for business. We must encourage, not stifle, small business development."

Havard is a member of Rotary International, the Lions Club and the East Feliciana Parish Chamber of Commerce. He is a member of the trade association, the Louisiana Oil and Gas Association. He volunteers for the Easter Seals Foundation. He has been a volunteer youth baseball coach and an appointed member of the Zachary Taylor Parkway Commission.

=== Louisiana House of Representatives ===
Havard was elected representative in the general election held on November 19, 2011. The incumbent Tom McVea, a former Democrat-turned Republican was term-limited. Havard defeated the Democrat Ken Dawson, 6,626 (61.4 percent) to 4,170 (38.6 percent). Havard won his second term in the House in the primary election held on October 24, 2015, with 8,782 votes (63.4 percent) to Democratic candidate Ronnie Jett's 5,067 ballots (36.6 percent).

On May 18, 2016, Havard introduced an amendment to a bill requiring that strippers be over twenty-one years of age. His amendment mandated that strippers also be no more than 28 years old and weigh no more than 160 pounds. He later withdrew the amendment but would not apologize when accused of sexism by his legislative colleague, Helena Moreno. She claimed that Havard's amendment would have applied equally to male strippers. Havard said that an apology would have meant obeisance to political correctness. Governor John Bel Edwards called Havard's remark "in bad taste, and it wasn't funny." The incident attracted national attention.

On September 25, 2017, Havard issued a statement calling for the state to end all public funding to the New Orleans Saints football team because of player protests.

In the race for the West Feliciana Parish presidency, Havard defeated two fellow Republicans, Lauren Field and John Thompson, in the nonpartisan blanket primary held on November 6, 2018. Havard finished with 2,673 votes (58 percent); Field, 1,277 (28 percent) and Thompson, 630 (14 percent. Turnout exceeded 58 percent of registered voters.

Sometimes called a "Republican in Name Only" (RINO), Havard said that he has worked to obtain passage of a balanced budget without causing harm to state services. Havard said that he is frustrated with legislative partisanship and urged legislators to develop "the art of compromise. You don’t get everything you want, they don’t get everything they want, but you move toward helping people."

Two candidates remain in the race to succeed Havard in the House. Republican Dennis Aucoin finished the first round of balloting with 2,300 votes (45 percent) and faces a runoff with the Independent Roy Daryl Adams, who drew 1,556 (31 percent).

=== President of West Felician Parish ===
Havard was elected parish president of West Feliciana Parish in the primary election held on November 6, 2018, for the position being vacated by Kevin Couhig, who announced his resignation effective December 2018. He will serve through Couhig's unexpired term until December 2019.

== Personal life ==
Havard and his wife, the former Shondell Escher, a public schoolteacher in St. Francisville, have two sons. They are affiliated with the historic Grace Episcopal Church in St. Francisville.

Preceded by Kevin Couhig	President of West Feliciana Parish; 2019–	Succeeded by Successor pending

Louisiana House of Representatives
Preceded by Tom McVea	Louisiana State Representative for District 62 (East and West Feliciana parishes and part of East Baton Rouge Parish); 2012–2018	Succeeded by Pending special election
