= Ryan Bourriaque =

American politician for Louisiana

Member of the Louisiana House of Representatives from the 47th district
- Incumbent
- Assumed office 2019
- Preceded by: Bob Hensgens

Personal details
- Born: Ryan Joseph Bourriaque
- Party: Republican
- Spouse: Megan
- Children: 3
- Education: Louisiana State University (BS, MS)

Ryan Joseph Bourriaque (/ˈbʊriɑːk/ BUURR-ee-ahk;) is an American politician serving as a member of the Louisiana House of Representatives from the 47th district. Elected in November 2018, he assumed office in 2019.

== Early life and education ==
Bourriaque is a native of Grand Chenier, Louisiana. He earned a Bachelor of Science degree in psychology and a Master of Science in resource economics and environmental policy from Louisiana State University.

== Career ==
From 2008 to 2010, Bourriaque served as an assistant planner in the Cameron Parish Planning and Development Office. He later worked as a grants planner for Minvielle & Associates in Abbeville, Louisiana. Since 2012, he has worked as an administrator for the Cameron Parish Police Jury. He was elected to the Louisiana House of Representatives in November 2018 and assumed office in 2019.
