= Chris Erwin =

American politician

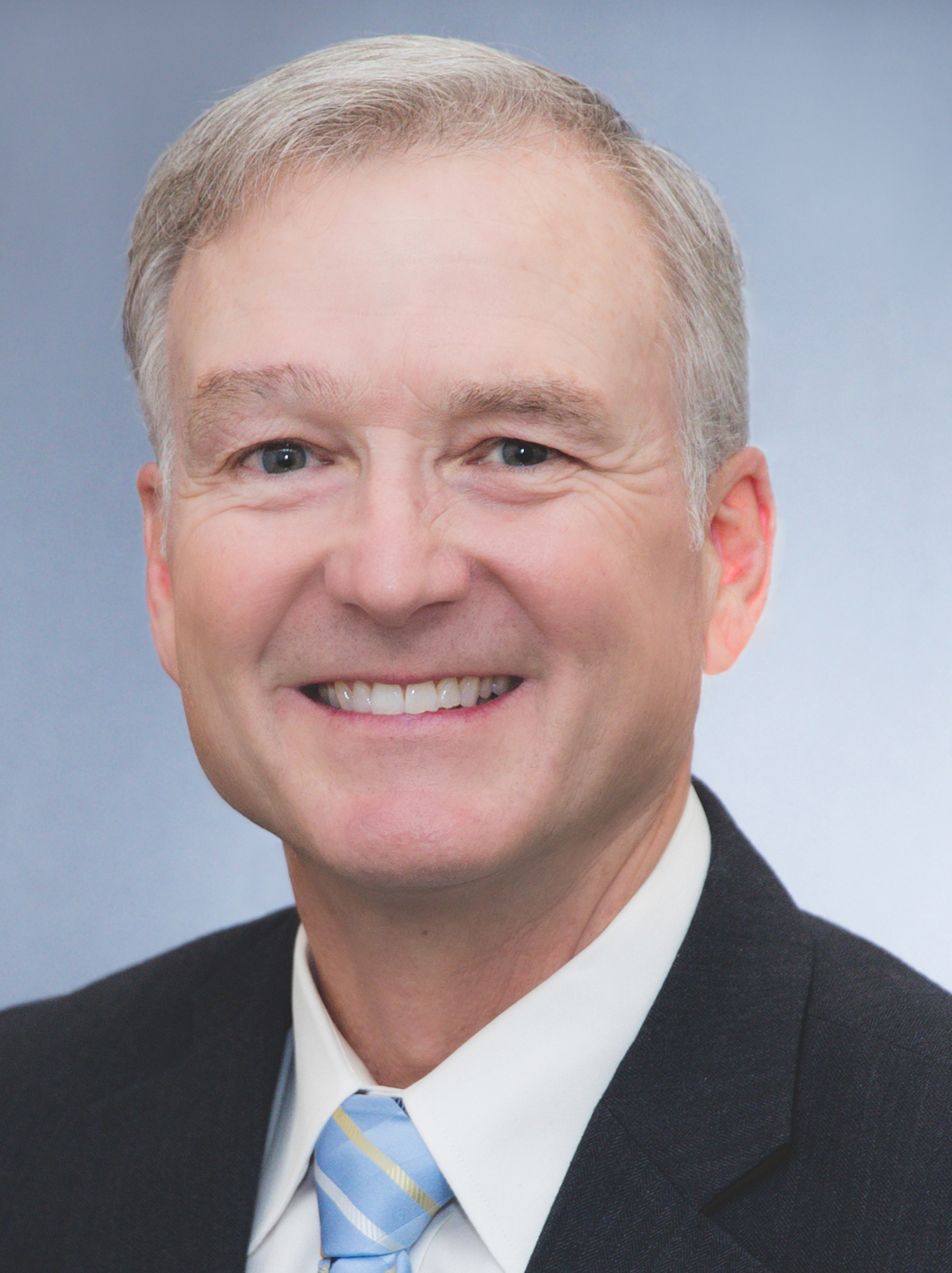

Member of the Georgia House of Representatives
- Incumbent
- Assumed office April 9, 2019
- Preceded by: Himself
- Constituency: 28th District (2019–2023); 32nd District (2023–Present)
- In office January 14, 2019 – February 8, 2019
- Preceded by: Dan Gasaway
- Succeeded by: Himself
- Constituency: 28th District

Personal details
- Born: Christopher Bell Erwin; April 26, 1962 (age 64)
- Party: Republican
- Education: University of Georgia (BS)
- Website: https://chriserwinforgeorgia.com/

Christopher Bell Erwin (born April 26, 1962) is an American politician. He is affiliated with the Republican Party, and was elected a member of the Georgia House of Representatives in 2018. Erwin represents the 28th district, which covers the entirety of Banks County and Stephens County, as well as the eastern region of Habersham County in northeast Georgia.

== Pre-political career ==
Before becoming a representative, Erwin was a business director for Carroll Daniel Construction Company, and a school administrator in Carroll and Henry counties. He was the superintendent of the Banks County School System for eleven years. Erwin was named Banks County Citizen of the Year in 2006, and was voted Georgia School Superintendent of the Year in 2013.

== Political career ==
Erwin initially defeated incumbent Dan Gasaway in a close election in the May 22, 2018 Republican primary. Gasaway challenged the results, claiming that there were votes cast outside of the district for the election. Stacey Abrams cited the election as an example of election fraud under Georgia Secretary of State Brian Kemp, her opponent in the 2018 Georgia gubernatorial election. A judge for Banks County ruled in favor of Gasaway's challenge and a special election was held on December 4, 2018. Erwin won the race by a closer margin of two votes. After being sworn in as the new representative, Erwin was temporarily removed from the House, due to a court order allowing Gasaway to challenge the results again. A final election was held April 9, 2019, in which Erwin won with 75% of the vote.

Georgia House of Representatives
| Preceded by Dan Gasaway | Member of the Georgia House of Representatives from the 28th district 2019 | Succeeded by Himself |
| Preceded by Himself | Member of the Georgia House of Representatives from the 28th district 2019–2023 | Succeeded by Brent Cox |
| Preceded by Alan Powell | Member of the Georgia House of Representatives from the 32nd district 2023–Present | Incumbent |
