= Bill Yearta =

American politician from Georgia

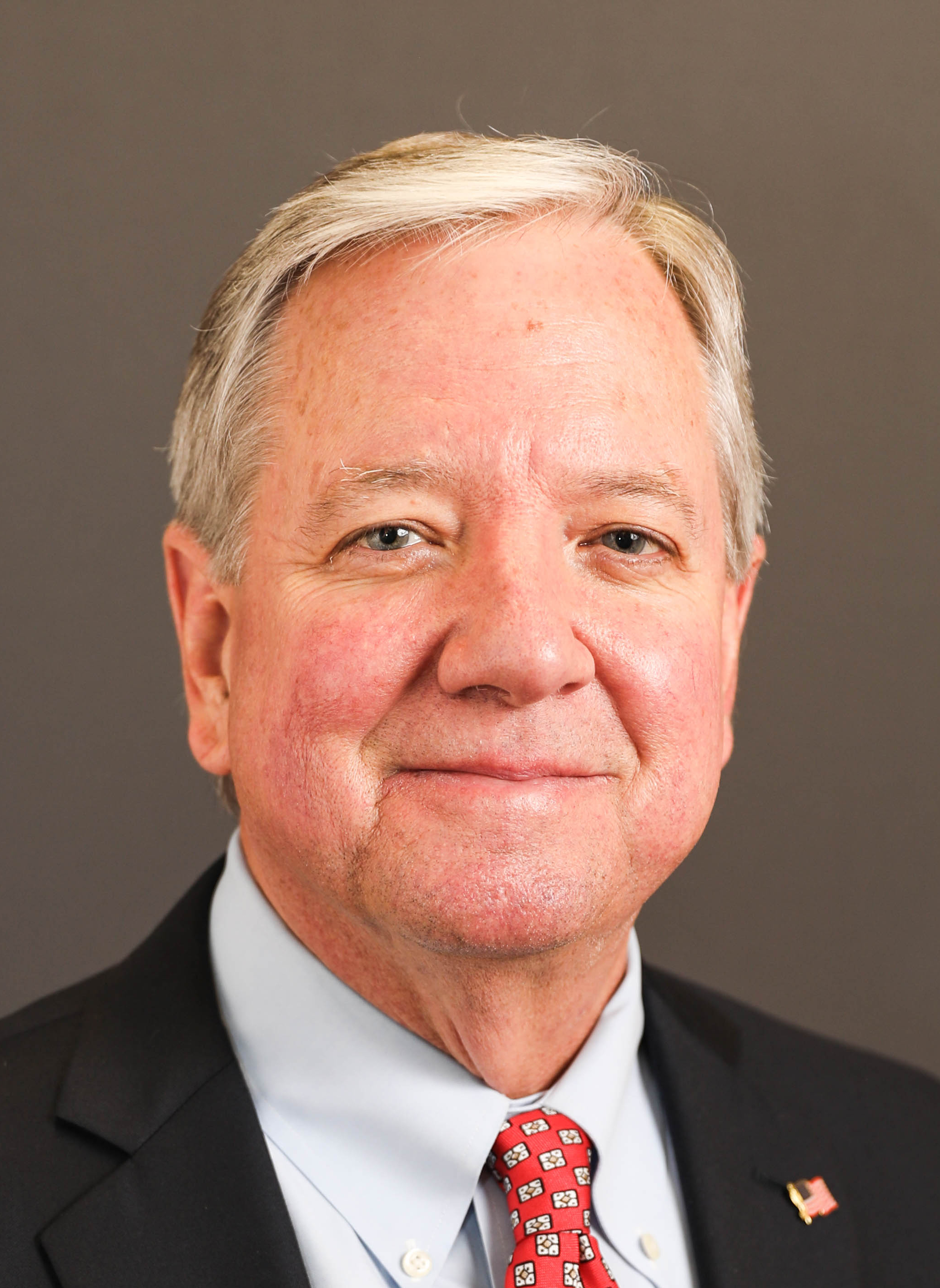
- Official headshot

Member of the Georgia House of Representatives from the 152nd district
- Incumbent
- Assumed office December 24, 2019
- Preceded by: Ed Rynders

Personal details
- Born: June 22, 1958 (age 68)
- Party: Republican
- Spouse: Susan
- Occupation: Politician

William Joseph Yearta (born June 22, 1958) is an American politician from Georgia. Yearta is a Republican member of Georgia House of Representatives for District 152.

Yearta previously served as Mayor of Sylvester, Georgia, having resigned the office to run in the special election for the State House seat he currently holds.
