= Ezequiel Santiago =

American politician (1973–2019)

Member of the Connecticut House of Representatives from the 130th district
- In office 2009 – March 15, 2019
- Preceded by: Felipe Reinoso
- Succeeded by: Antonio Felipe

Personal details
- Born: April 22, 1973 Camden, New Jersey, U.S.
- Died: March 15, 2019 (aged 45) Bridgeport, Connecticut, U.S.
- Party: Democratic
- Relatives: Americo Santiago (father)
- Education: Gibbs College

Ezequiel Santiago (April 22, 1973 – March 15, 2019) was an American politician.

== Early life ==
Santiago was born in Camden, New Jersey. He moved with his family to Bridgeport, Connecticut. Santiago worked on the political campaigns of his father Americo Santiago and stepfather Mitch Robles. His father also served in the Connecticut General Assembly. Ezequiel Santiago served on the Bridgeport City Council until 2008, when he ran for the open seat in the 130th district of the Connecticut House of Representatives. Santiago took office as a member of the Democratic Party in 2009, succeeding Felipe Reinoso.

== Sudden Death ==
Ezequiel Santiago, a Democratic State Representative for Connecticut’s 130th District, died at 45 due to a heart attack. Santiago, known for his dedication to Bridgeport, served as a City Councilman and State Representative for over a decade. In 2019, he was elected to lead Bridgeport’s legislative delegation and was also involved with the Conservation Corps and the Public Facilities Department.

Governor Ned Lamont ordered flags to fly at half-staff in Santiago's honor, praising his commitment to public service and his community. Santiago, who was remembered for his thoughtful and effective approach, made significant contributions, including supporting the Steelpointe Harbor redevelopment.

State Representative Chris Rosario expressed deep sadness, noting Santiago’s unexpected death and his impact as a mentor and friend. Santiago was active in various legislative roles, including chairing the Banking Committee and serving on Appropriations and Commerce. His early political career included volunteer work for his father’s campaigns and various local positions.
