= Matt Barton (politician) =

American politician

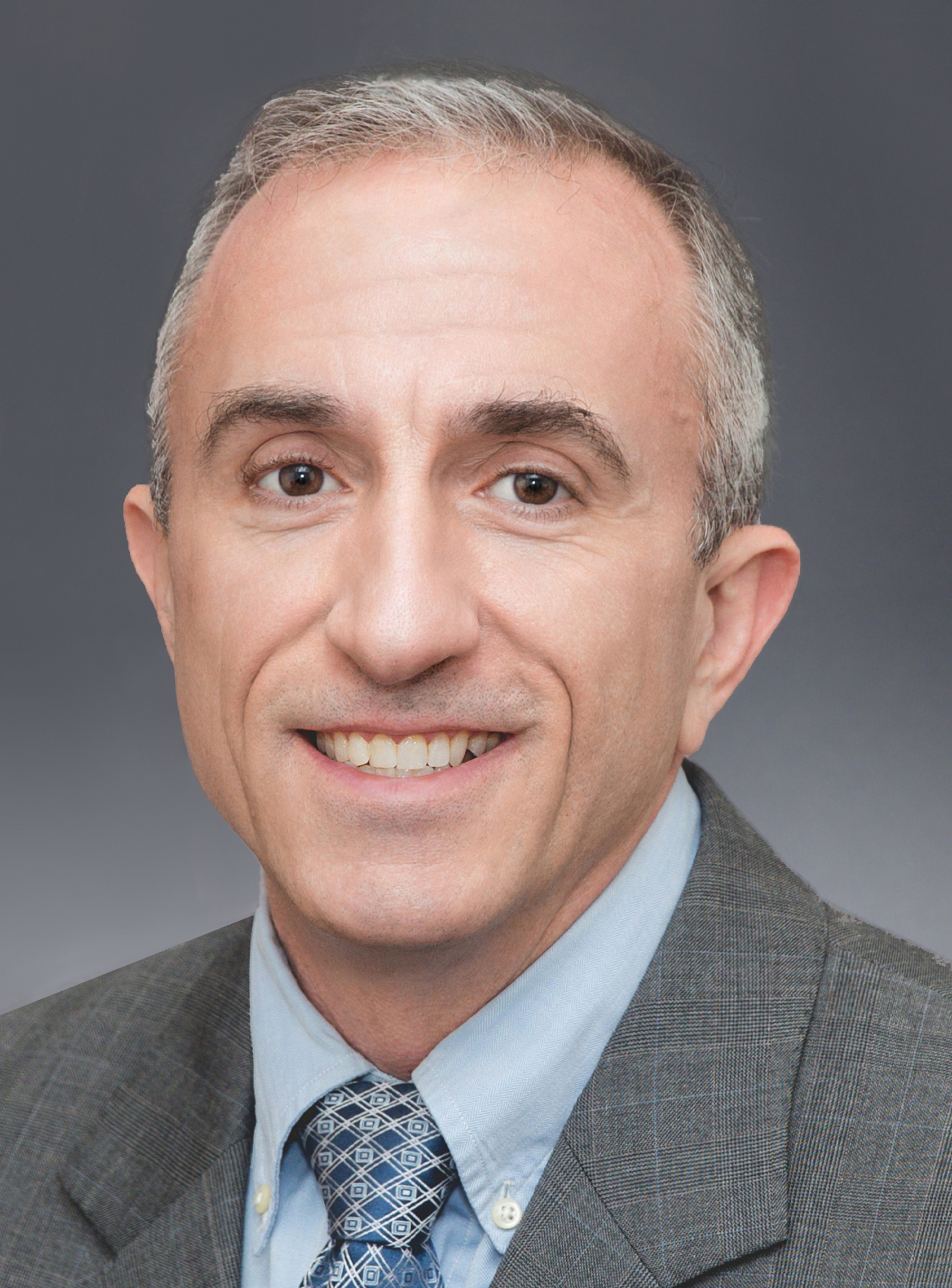

Member of the Georgia House of Representatives from the 5th district
- Incumbent
- Assumed office February 12, 2019
- Preceded by: John Meadows III

Personal details
- Born: Madison Fain Barton; April 28, 1972 (age 54)
- Party: Republican
- Spouse: Lynne
- Occupation: Self employed

Madison Fain Barton (born April 28, 1972) is an American politician from Georgia. Barton is a Republican member of Georgia House of Representatives for District 5.

== Personal life ==
Barton's wife is Lynne Barton. They have two children. Barton and his family live in Calhoun, Georgia.
