= Ed Rynders =

American politician (1960–2022)

Member of the Georgia House of Representatives from the 152nd district
- In office January 10, 2005 – September 5, 2019
- Preceded by: Anne Mueller
- Succeeded by: Bill Yearta

Member of the Georgia House of Representatives from the 137th district
- In office January 13, 2003 – January 10, 2005
- Preceded by: Jimmy Skipper
- Succeeded by: David Graves

Personal details
- Born: February 17, 1960 Iruma Air Base, Sayama, Japan
- Died: May 13, 2022 (aged 62) St. Simons Island, Georgia, U.S.
- Party: Republican

Ed Rynders (February 17, 1960 – May 13, 2022) was an American politician who served in the Georgia House of Representatives from 2003–2019.
