= Americo Santiago =

American politician (born 1951)

Americo L. Santiago (born July 4, 1951) is an American politician.

Santiago lived in Bridgeport, Connecticut. He served in the Connecticut House of Representatives from 1989 to 1995 and was a Democrat. His son Ezequiel Santiago also served in the Connecticut General Assembly.
