= Jeremy LaCombe =

American politician

Member of the Louisiana House of Representatives from the 18th district
- Incumbent
- Assumed office March 2019
- Preceded by: Major Thibaut

Personal details
- Born: Fordoche, Louisiana, U.S.
- Party: Republican (since 2023)
- Other political affiliations: Democratic (until 2023)
- Children: 2
- Education: Northwestern State University (BA); Louisiana State University (JD)

Jeremy S. LaCombe is an American attorney and politician serving as a member of the Louisiana House of Representatives from the 18th district. He assumed office in 2019 after a special election. Elected as a Democrat, he switched parties and became a Republican on April 10, 2023.

== Early life and education ==
LaCombe was born in Fordoche, Louisiana. He earned a Bachelor of Arts degree in political science from Northwestern State University in 1999 and a Juris Doctor from the Paul M. Hebert Law Center at Louisiana State University in 2004.

== Career ==
In 2004 and 2005, LaCombe worked as a law clerk at Fisher, Boyd, Brown, Boudreaux & Huguenard. In 2005 and 2006, he served as assistant district attorney of Caddo Parish, Louisiana. He was also an attorney at LeBlanc & Waddell. Since 2008, he has worked as an attorney at the LaCrombe Law Firm. LaCombe was elected to the Louisiana House of Representatives in a March 2019 special election, succeeding Major Thibaut. LaCombe also serves as vice chair of the House Select Committee on Homeland Security.

On April 10, 2023, LaCombe announced he had left the Democratic Party and would be registering as a Republican.
