= John Meadows III =

American politician

Member of the Georgia House of Representatives from the 5th district
- In office 2004 – November 13, 2018
- Preceded by: Craig Brock
- Succeeded by: Matt Barton

Personal details
- Born: August 28, 1944 Calhoun, Georgia, U.S.
- Died: November 13, 2018 (aged 74) Calhoun, Georgia, U.S.
- Party: Republican
- Spouse: Marie Meadows
- Children: 2
- Education: American College
- Occupation: Politician

John Dudley Meadows III (August 28, 1944 – November 13, 2018) was an American businessman and politician from Georgia. Meadows is a former mayor of Calhoun and a Republican member of Georgia House of Representatives.

== Early life ==
On August 28, 1944, Meadows was born in Calhoun, Georgia. Meadows' father was John Dudley Meadows Jr. and his mother was Doris Esther Scott “Scottie” Meadows. In 1962, Meadows graduated from Calhoun High School.

== Education ==
Meadows attended West Georgia College. In 1986, Meadows earned a Chartered Life Underwriter (ALU) certificate from American College. In 1991, Meadows earned a Chartered Financial Consultant certificate from American College.

== Career ==
In military, Meadows served in the United States Marine Corps. Meadows worked in the insurance business.

In 1983, Meadows was elected as a city council member of Calhoun, Georgia. In 1986, Meadows served as mayor of Calhoun, Georgia, until 1998.

On November 2, 2004, Meadows won the election unopposed and became a Republican member of Georgia House of Representatives for District 5. Meadows continued serving District 5. On November 8, 2016, as an incumbent, Meadows won the election unopposed and continued serving District 5. On November 6, 2018, as an incumbent, Meadows won the election. Meadows defeated Brian Rosser with 81.56% of the votes. With Meadows' death, Meadows was unable to serve District 5 in the 2019–2020 term.5.

== Personal life ==
Meadows' wife is Marie Meadows. They have two children. Meadows and his family live in Calhoun, Georgia.

On November 13, 2018, Meadows died from cancer in Calhoun, Georgia. Meadows was 74.
