= Roy Daryl Adams =

American politician

Member of the Louisiana House of Representatives from the 62nd district
- Incumbent
- Assumed office 2019
- Preceded by: Kenny Havard

Personal details
- Party: Democratic (2023–present)
- Other political affiliations: Independent (before 2023)
- Children: 4

Roy Daryl Adams is an American politician serving as a Democratic member of the Louisiana House of Representatives from the 62nd district. He was elected in a special election on March 30, 2019, and assumed office soon after.

== Education ==
Adams attended Southwest Mississippi Junior College and the University of Louisiana at Monroe.

== Career ==
Adams is the founder and owner of Adams Enterprises, a grocery store. He has also worked as an independent contractor for Capital City Press, a commercial printing organization based in Baton Rouge, Louisiana. He was elected to the Louisiana House of Representatives in a March 30, 2019 special election, succeeding Kenny Havard.

In April 2023, Adams changed from an independent to a Democrat.

In 2024, Adams voted in favor of advancing House Bill 545 from the Administration of Criminal Justice committee. The bill, filed by Republican Beryl Amedee, would remove legal protections for obscenity from teachers and librarians in all Louisiana public schools.
