= Major Thibaut =

American politician (born 1977)

Major Thibaut Jr.

Parish President of Pointe Coupee Parish, Louisiana
- Incumbent
- Assumed office January 2019

Member of the Louisiana House of Representatives from the 18th district
- In office 2008–2020
- Preceded by: Don Cazayoux
- Succeeded by: Jeremy LaCombe

Personal details
- Born: January 3, 1977 (age 49) Oscar, Louisiana, U.S.
- Party: Democratic
- Education: Louisiana State University (BA)

Major Thibaut Jr. (born January 3, 1977), is an American politician who served as a member of the Louisiana House of Representatives for the 18th district from 2008 to 2020. The district encompasses Iberville, West Baton Rouge, West Feliciana, and Pointe Coupee parishes. Thibaut is known for his efforts to obtain infrastructure improvements in his largely rural district.

== Early life and education ==
Thibaut was born in Oscar, Louisiana. He graduated the Catholic High School of Pointe Coupee in 1995 and earned a Bachelor of Arts degree in political science and government from Louisiana State University in 1999.

== Career ==
He is a member of the Million Dollar Roundtable. He is also affiliated with the American Quarter Horse Association, Lions International, the Chamber of Commerce, and the National Rifle Association of America.

== Career ==
On September 30, 2006, Thibaut was elected to the District F seat on the Pointe Coupee Parish School Board over two other Democrats.

=== Louisiana House of Representatives ===
In May 2017, Thibaut called for the combination of four previously separate pieces of legislation which collectively would have raised taxes on businesses and lowered them for what he said would constitute 90 percent of individual taxpayers. The measure was introduced by the Republican Representative Rob Shadoin of Ruston. It died in the House Ways and Means Committee, which prompted Shadoin to remark, "You can kiss tax reform goodbye." Democratic Governor John Bel Edwards, who backed the Shadoin bill, blamed its defeat on the power of business lobbyists.

=== Mayor of Pointe Coupee Parish ===
In December 2018, Thibaut resigned from the Louisiana House of Representatives to become president of Pointe Coupee Parish.
