= Héctor A. Díaz =

American politician (born 1960)

Héctor A. Díaz (born August 15, 1960) is an American politician.

Díaz was born in Manhattan, in New York City, New York. He went to Inter-American University and to Housatonic Community College. Díaz was a caseworker. He lived in Bridgeport, Connecticut. Díaz served in the Connecticut House of Representatives from 1995 to 2001 and was a Democrat.
