= Wexford Health Sources =

American healthcare services company

Wexford Health Sources, Inc. is an American healthcare services company that is headquartered in Foster Plaza Two in Green Tree, Pennsylvania, near Pittsburgh.

The Mississippi Department of Corrections (MDOC) contracts with Wexford, and Wexford provides medical services to inmates at state-operated facilities. In 2008 Steve Twedt of the Pittsburgh Post-Gazette said that Wexford was "among the most successful local companies people never hear about," despite the fact that the former chief executive of Allegheny County, Jim Roddey, described by Twedt as "one of the region's most prominent local politicians," headed the company. As of that year the president of Wexford, Mark Hale, said that he tries to keep a low profile because the inmates the company serves are very litigious.

== History ==
Wexford opened in 1992.

A three-year Mississippi contract, to Wexford Health Sources awarded in 2006, was for $95 million. It was to provide medical, mental health, pharmacy, rehabilitation, utilization management, claims processing and technology services to more than 14,000 Mississippi prisoners at 34 facilities statewide. The contracts for four for-profit Mississippi prisons were subsequently awarded sequentially to Health Assurance LLC, a Jackson, Mississippi firm owned by Dr. Carl Reddix, and obstetrician/gynecologist. In 2008, the company received a contract to "provide inmate health care services" at the Walnut Grove Correctional Facility, which was then renewed in 2011. Transfers of contracts for East Mississippi Correctional Facility and Marshall County Correctional Facility followed in 2012. The final contract was for Wilkinson County Correctional Facility in 2013. Dr. Reddix was indicted for bribing the state Corrections Commissioner Chris Epps in 2016.

== Controversies ==
According to an October 2013 report by the American Friends Service Committee, Wexford has "a well published history of problems" in several states across the country. Failure to provide adequate staffing and adequate and timely medical care and charging states for more staff than the company actually provided were common complaints. The report notes that Wexford has faced fines in some of these states, "including a $12,500 fine by New Mexico’s Department of Corrections in 2006; a $106,000 fine by Ohio’s Correction Department in 2009; $50,000 by Chesapeake, Va., in 2006 for staffing shortages; three fines totaling $273,000 by Florida’s Department of Corrections in 2005 for what it described as “service-delivery issues that were resolved” before the contract's end; and a $68,000 fine by the Broward Sheriff's Office in Florida in 2003 for delays in providing medical services."

After a six-month investigation, America Tonight reported in 2014 to have found "disturbing cases of inadequate treatment, and evidence that Wexford Health Sources, the first private company Arizona contracted to provide prison health care, was aware that it was violating prisoners' constitutional rights." One such case involved Regan Clarine, a young pregnant woman serving a 2 1/2-year sentence for possessing a narcotic for sale who was forced to undergo a cesarean section against her wishes and when the wound opened back up in her cell, she was treated with an antiquated method using McDonald's sugar: "They decided to use sugar ... like McDonald’s sugar," said Regan. "They would open it and pour it inside and put gauze over and tape it up. And I had to do that for like three weeks."

On February 8, 2017, Wexford Health Sources along with Cornell Companies, Management and Training Corporation, Global Tel Link, Sentinel Offender Services and many others were sued by the Mississippi Attorney General Jim Hood for allegedly engaging in corrupt contracts with the Mississippi Department of Corrections and its former Commissioner, Chris Epps. The lawsuit claims the companies violated Mississippi public ethics, racketeering and antitrust laws along with several others.
