= Marshall County Correctional Facility =

Prison in Mississippi, United States

Marshall County Correctional Center
- Interactive map of Marshall County Correctional Center
- Location: 833 West Street Holly Springs, Mississippi; 34.795°N 89.438°W
- Status: Open
- Security class: Minimum and medium
- Capacity: 1,076
- Opened: 1996
- Managed by: [MDOC]

Marshall County Correctional Center (MCCF) is a prison in Holly Springs, Marshall County, Mississippi, operated by the Mississippi Department of Corrections. It was formerly a for-profit prison managed by Management and Training Corporation (MTC) on behalf of MDOC.

The minimum/medium-security prison facility has an authorized capacity of 1,076 and is on 17 acres (6.9 ha) of enclosed area. The prison property has a total of 47 acres (19 ha). The Marshall County Correctional Facility is one of three private prisons operated on behalf of the state as of March 2017.

In November 2014, Mississippi Corrections Commissioner Chris Epps resigned a day before he was indicted by the US Department of Justice (DOJ) on corruption charges for bribery and taking kickbacks. Commissioner since 2002, he was known for reducing the use of solitary confinement in state prisons, and reducing prison populations after supporting passage of a 2009 bill allowing earlier parole for non-violent offenders with a low risk of recidivism. Cecil McCrory, a business man and former state legislator, was indicted for bribing Epps in return for having prison-services contracts steered to him and his clients. He had worked as a consultant for MTC, GEO Group, and Cornell Companies, which had previously operated private prisons in Mississippi. By November 2015 both men had pleaded guilty and were cooperating with law enforcement in the investigation. A third co-conspirator, former lawmaker Irb Benjamin, also joined the lengthening list of those pleading out to reduce the consequences of their crimes. Benjamin pleaded guilty to federal charges on October 18, 2016. He faced 10 years in prison, plus a fine of up to a quarter-million dollars. Judge Henry Travillion Wingate sentenced him to 70 months in prison, fined him $100,000 and ordered him to forfeit $260,782. Benjamin, who said he was "pressured" by Epps, estimated that he paid the commissioner between $180,000 and $225,000 in cash bribes to secure support for the regional jails. His plea also covered bribes paid for drug and alcohol rehab programs which his company ran under contract to the state. LaMarca told Wingate, "it's just a matter of time" until others whom Benjamin informed upon were indicted. Benjamin is being held at the minimum security Federal Correctional Institution, Forrest City, Arkansas, with an anticipated release date of June 13, 2022.

Numerous other people have been convicted in this case and prosecutions were continuing in 2017. In February 2017, Jim Hood, the Mississippi Attorney General announced civil suits seeking damages and punitive damages from 15 contractors and several individuals associated with prison operations.

On September 13, 2021, the state began operating it directly.

== Accreditations ==
The prison was accredited by the American Correctional Association in January 1998, June 2000, September 2003, January 2007, January 2010, and March 2014.

== Operation contracts ==
This facility has been operated by several for-profit prison management companies on behalf of the state. Cornell Companies was the first, running the prison into 2010, when it was acquired in a merger with GEO Group. GEO took over its contracts for three private prisons in Mississippi. The other two were Walnut Grove Youth Correctional Facility and East Mississippi Correctional Facility. In addition, the state had contracts with Corrections Corporation of America for the Tallahatchie County Correctional Facility and the Wilkinson County Correctional Facility.

In 2010 a class action suit was filed by the ACLU and the Southern Poverty Law Center against GEO Group and the Mississippi Department of Corrections for mistreatment of prisoners and failure of operation of the Walnut Grove Youth Correctional Facility. As a result of the settlement of this suit, the state forced out GEO Group and rebid to acquire a new management company.

At the time, Commissioner Chris Epps, MDOC, said that the department believed it would be advantageous for the state to solicit a combined bid for all three prisons for which contracts were being offered. It awarded a contract to Management and Training Corporation of Utah for all three private facilities. The public was not informed of the financial specifics of the contracts. In 2013 MTC was also awarded a contract for Wilkinson County Correctional Facility.

Epps resigned in November 2014 and pleaded guilty in February 2015 to charges related to Operation Mississippi Hustle, a major corruption investigation by the FBI. He is estimated to have been paid $1.47 million in bribes and kickbacks related to contracts which he had steered to certain prison management and other related companies during the previous decade. He cooperated with law enforcement in a continuing investigation in which several people have pleaded guilty and others have been convicted. Epps is due to be sentenced in May 2017.

In the summer of 2016, the state closed the Walnut Grove facility, which had been converted to serve adults only as part of the 2012 settlement. MTC was awarded a new 10-year contract by MDOC, effective August 2016, for management of Marshall County Correctional Facility, East Mississippi Correctional Facility, and Wilkinson County Correctional Facility.

== Incidents ==
On March 27, 2001, 24-year-old Daniel Underwood was attacked by another inmate at the MCCF. The autopsy showed he had died of head injuries, apparently suffered during a beating by other prisoners. Another inmate apparently assisted in the attack by obscuring the view of security personnel. The prison was managed by Wackenhut Corrections Corporation. Warden E.L. Sparkman declined to discuss the circumstances, referring questions to the Corrections Department.

In 2009, the Mississippi Supreme Court reinstated a 2006 lawsuit filed pro se by ex-inmate Dennis Dobbs over conditions at the MCCF. He complained of a lack of air conditioning, ventilation and concerns regarding fire safety including an absence of sprinklers. The Supreme Court said that a Marshall County judge erred in dismissing the lawsuit. The justices said the Chancery court judge erroneously considered Dennis Dobbs' lawsuit as an appeal of his assault conviction prosecuted in another county. The Supreme Court said Dobbs' tort, for what he referred to as "inhumane" conditions at the Marshall County prison warranted a hearing.

In March 2015, corrections officials conducted a search at the MCCF and the state's three other for-profit prisons, seizing weapons (including 36 homemade knives), cell phones, and other prohibited materials at MCCF. "We believe there were some staff complicit in bringing in contraband," Corrections Commissioner Marshall Fisher said, noting one had already resigned, and that four additional staff members were suspected of complicity.

Then U.S. Attorney Brad Pigott said the quantities of weapons seized leads him to believe that contraband weapons are more common at for-profit prisons. "This makes clear that prisons operated by corporations are much more dangerous places to work." Private prisons are using money "which could have gone into hiring enough guards to find and remove knives from prisoners, and they are sending those tax dollars instead to their corporate headquarters," he continued. According to Issa Arnita, MTC's spokesperson, "Employees caught attempting to bring contraband into our facilities will not only be terminated but will be criminally prosecuted to the highest extent of the law."

On November 22, 2016, inmate Oscar Pirtle was killed in an altercation with another inmate.

On April 23, 2019, after a guard was assaulted by an inmate in a housing units, he was taken by ambulance and hospitalized, said MTC spokesperson Issa Arnita. The Marshall County Sheriff reported that a fire broke out during the incident. Arnita did not mention the fire nor return requests for further comment. On April 25, the Clarion Ledger newspaper received five videos plus two photos taken by a Marshall County inmate's phone. They showed a smoke-filled prison with soot high on the walls. According to the inmate, "If not for the fire sprinkler going off, I can assure you every inmate on the zone of delta 4 in Marshall county correctional facility would have died!" In the videos, smoke fills the prison and reached the cell block ceiling. It was reported that the facility had been on lockdown for four months.
