= Lisa Jo Chamberlin =

America convicted murderer (born 1972)

- 2022 MDOC mug shot of Chamberlin
- Born: September 30, 1972 (age 54); Oregon, U.S.
- Status: Incarcerated
- Motive: Robbery
- Conviction: Capital murder (2 counts)
- Penalty: Death

Details
- Victims: Vernon Hulett, 34; Linda Heintzelman, 38
- Date: March 19–20, 2004
- Location: Hattiesburg, Mississippi
- Imprisoned at: Central Mississippi Correctional Facility

Lisa Jo Chamberlin (born September 30, 1972) is an American woman convicted of the 2004 double murder of Vernon Hulett and Linda Heintzelman in Mississippi. Chamberlin and her then boyfriend Roger Lee Gillett killed the two victims inside Hulett's house in Hattiesburg, Mississippi, and dismembered their bodies, before storing the body parts in a freezer, which was later taken to an abandoned farm in Russell County, Kansas.

Both Chamberlin and Gillett were found guilty of capital murder on both counts and sentenced to death. Gillett's death sentence was commuted to life without parole in 2018, leaving solely Chamberlin to remain on death row for the double murder. Since 2006, Chamberlin is incarcerated on death row at the Central Mississippi Correctional Facility, and she is the only woman on Mississippi's death row as of 2025.

== Early life ==
Lisa Jo Chamberlin was born in Oregon on September 30, 1972. According to court documents, Chamberlin had a troubled childhood that included physical, emotional and sexual abuse. Her biological father often abused Chamberlin and her mother, and Chamberlin's parents divorced when she was about three or four. Chamberlin's mother, who turned to alcoholism and had bipolar disorder, also abused Chamberlin when she was young. Chamberlin's mother later remarried; the stepfather likewise mistreated both Chamberlin and her stepsister.

Additionally, Chamberlin was sexually assaulted by her half-brother. A school teacher had also sexually abused Chamberlin when she was still in fourth grade. Upon reaching adulthood, Chamberlin married three times and had two sons and a daughter, one with each of her three partners, the second of whom had abused her in the past. Despite this, Chamberlin was described as a mother who loved her children dearly.

== 2004 Hattiesburg murders ==
In March 2004, 31-year-old Lisa Jo Chamberlin and her 29-year-old boyfriend Roger Lee Gillett (born June 9, 1974) committed a double murder in Hattiesburg, Mississippi.

Around the end of February 2004, the couple drove from Kansas to Hattiesburg in Mississippi, where Gillett's 34-year-old cousin Vernon Carl Hulett (November 18, 1969 – March 20, 2004) and his 38-year-old girlfriend Linda Marie Heintzelman (March 18, 1966 – March 20, 2004) lived. The couple stayed at Hulett's house for the following few weeks until March 19, 2004, the date when both Hulett and Heintzelman were last seen alive before they mysteriously disappeared.

Both Heintzelman and Hulett were reported to have been murdered by Chamberlin and Gillett on March 20, 2004, a day after they were purportedly last seen alive. On the day of the murders, the couple were asked to move out of Hulett's house and get their own place. Reportedly, Gillett and Chamberlin killed both Hulett and Heinztelman as a result of Gillett's unhappiness and anger over having to move out, although Chamberlin claimed in her confession that the victims could not open their safe while they tried to rob the victims, and thus were killed by Chamberlin and Gillett. Heintzelman was raped by Gillett with a beer bottle before she was beaten, stabbed and finally suffocated to death with a plastic bag wrapped over her head. Hulett, on the other hand, was slashed on the throat and battered to death and his killing took place before that of Heintzelman.

After murdering Heintzelman and Hulett, Chamberlin and Gillett chopped up the bodies of the victims and kept the dismembered body parts inside a freezer. They loaded the freezer onto Hulett's truck, which they drove to an abandoned farm in Russell County, Kansas. The couple were able to avoid capture for nine days until March 29, 2004, when the police responded to a report that the couple were in possession of a stolen vehicle (Hulett's truck) and were manufacturing methamphetamine at the farm. The police subsequently found the dismembered body parts and other evidence of the double murder on the farm while executing a search warrant for the drug investigation, and this led to the arrest of the couple.

== Trial and sentencing ==
After their arrest on March 29, 2004, both Lisa Chamberlin and Roger Gillett were charged with two counts of capital murder, an offence that warrants the death penalty under Mississippi state law if found guilty.

Chamberlin was the first of the pair to go to trial for the double murder. Chamberlin's trial took place for three days before a Forrest County jury. It was adduced during trial that based on the autopsy findings by Dr. Donald Pojman, Hulett died of blunt-force injuries to the left side of the head, while the cause of Heintzelman's death was caused by sharp force injuries to the torso and neck, asphyxiation and blunt force injuries to the head.

At the end of the trial, the jury found Chamberlin guilty of both counts of capital murder. The defence submitted in Chamberlin's sentencing trial that their client should be jailed for life instead of facing execution, and in a psychiatric report presented by the defence, Chamberlin was diagnosed with both post-traumatic stress disorder and borderline personality disorder, as a result of the trauma caused by the abuse she endured in her childhood and past relationships.

On the same day of Chamberlin's conviction, the jury recommended the death penalty, and thus, 33-year-old Chamberlin was sentenced to death via lethal injection by Forrest County Circuit Court Judge Bob Helfrich on August 4, 2006.

Roger Gillett stood trial the following year. Gillett's trial ran for four days from October 30, 2007, to November 2, 2007, and he was similarly found guilty of capital murder on both counts by another Forrest County jury. Gillett was likewise sentenced to death by the jury, with Judge Bob Helfrich formally imposing sentence on November 3, 2007.

== Appeal process ==
On July 17, 2008, Lisa Chamberlin's direct appeal to the Supreme Court of Mississippi was rejected.

On November 10, 2010, the Mississippi Supreme Court rejected a post-conviction appeal from Chamberlin.

On October 31, 2011, the U.S. Supreme Court rejected Chamberlin's petition for a new trial.

On May 6, 2015, Chamberlin was granted a new trial by a federal district judge on the basis that her jury was selected through alleged racial discrimination.

On April 27, 2017, the 5th U.S. Circuit Court of Appeals approved a new trial for Chamberlin by a majority ruling of 2–1, after Chamberlin made a claim that in her trial, the prosecution had unfairly excluded two African-American potential jurors in the jury selection of her trial, which amounted to racial discrimination that tainted the fairness of her trial, despite the fact that Chamberlin was white and not African-American. The state had earlier refuted Chamberlin's allegations in June 2016 and stated there was no clear and convincing evidence that the striking of these two African-American juror candidates was motivated by racism.

The prosecution, in return, appealed to the 5th U.S. Circuit Court of Appeals to review its decision in May 2017, and in July 2017, the full 15-member court agreed to review its decision. On March 20, 2018, by a majority decision of 9–5, the 5th U.S. Circuit Court of Appeals restored the capital murder convictions of Chamberlin and thereby reinstated her death sentences.

On June 28, 2019, the U.S. Supreme Court denied Chamberlin's appeal relating to the alleged racial discrimination in her jury selection phase.

On June 1, 2022, U.S. District Judge Carlton W. Reeves granted Chamberlin leave to appeal to the state courts against her conviction and sentence on the grounds of ineffective trial representation.

On May 14, 2025, the Mississippi Supreme Court dismissed Chamberlin's appeal for post-conviction relief.

On August 10, 2026, the Mississippi Supreme Court denied Chamberlin's third petition for post-conviction relief.

== Aftermath and other developments ==
Since her sentencing in 2006, Lisa Chamberlin is presently incarcerated on death row at the Central Mississippi Correctional Facility. Originally, Chamberlin was one of two women on death row in Mississippi. Michelle Byrom, who was initially sentenced to death in 2000 for soliciting the murder of her husband in 1999 in Tishomingo County, Mississippi, came close to execution in 2014. However, Byrom's conviction was overturned that same year on appeal, leading to her release in 2015 after she entered an Alford plea to lesser charges. Byrom died in 2019. Since Byrom's exoneration, Chamberlin remains the only female inmate on death row in Mississippi, and a November 2023 report showed that Chamberlin was one of 37 people who still remained on death row in Mississippi. If executed, Chamberlin would be the first woman put to death in the state since 1944.

Meanwhile, after the end of his trial, Roger Gillett, Chamberlin's former boyfriend and accomplice, was imprisoned on death row at the Mississippi State Penitentiary, the state's designated facility for male death row inmates. Gillett's appeal to the Supreme Court of Mississippi was rejected on July 1, 2010, and the U.S. Supreme Court also rejected Gillett's appeal on December 22, 2011. However, on June 12, 2014, the Mississippi Supreme Court vacated Gillett's two death sentences and remitted his case to the lower courts for re-sentencing, although the double murder convictions of Gillett still stand. Gillett's re-sentencing trial was scheduled to commence on November 16, 2015. The case, however, dragged on for four years with Gillett's re-sentencing being in limbo.

On July 25, 2018, Gillett was re-sentenced to life without parole, after the prosecution agreed to not seek the death penalty for Gillett a second time, a decision made after due consideration of the facts of the case and consultations with the victims' families. The commutation of Gillett's death sentences led to Chamberlin becoming the sole perpetrator of the murders left awaiting execution. Gillett is currently serving his life sentences at the Marshall County Correctional Facility, where he was transferred on March 29, 2024.

The case of Chamberlin and Gillett was featured in a 2021 crime documentary, titled Deadly Women.

As of 2025, Lisa Jo Chamberlin remains on death row for murdering both Vernon Hulett and Linda Heintzelman.

== See also ==
- Capital punishment in Mississippi
- List of death row inmates in the United States § Mississippi
- List of women on death row in the United States § Mississippi
