= Cecil McCrory =

American politician (b. 1951)

Cecil McCrory (born December 1, 1951) is a former Mississippi state legislator, justice court judge, Rankin County school board president and businessman. He was indicted in November 2014 for corruption related to his dealings with prison industry contractors. It was later revealed that he become an informant in the investigation, along with his partner in crime, ex-Commissioner of Corrections in Mississippi, Chris Epps. Epps was sentenced to 235 months and McCrory to 102 months in federal prison. Both men were fined and ordered to pay restitution. McCrory is being held at the Federal Correctional Institution, Talladega, Alabama, with a scheduled release date of April 24, 2025.

Pleaded guilty	Sentenced	Sentence	Started serving	Current location
February 25, 2015	February 3, 2017	8 1/2 years	November 30, 2017	Federal Correctional Institution, Talladega, AL

== Personal ==
With only a high school education, McCrory, from Brandon, Mississippi, became a Justice Court judge, in 1980. Four years later, he became an investigator with the Rankin County sheriff's office. In 1987, he was elected to the state legislature. He lost reelection to a third term in 1995. In 1996, Cecil became a lobbyist. In 1997, he began making payments to Epps, and MDOC manager. In 2000, he became a Rankin County Supervisor, though he only held the office for five months. In 2002, he partnered with Sam Waggoner, who became involved in the MDOC corruption schemes. In 2005, he started G.T. Enterprises of Mississippi, and won the MDOC's commissary services contract. Four months later, he sold that business at a substantial profit to Keefe Commissary Network. In 2008, he became a Rankin County School Board member, a position he held until he resigned when his indictment became public in November 2014.

Cecil and his wife, Janice had two children: Joshua and Courtney. In 2000, the car in which Courtney was riding was hit by an inebriated trucker, and she was killed. As a result, in 2009, the McCrory family was awarded $3,333,189 in damages. Josh became a justice court judge.

As an attorney Josh became counsel in numerous corrections-related lawsuits, defending East Mississippi State Prison, representing MDOC prisoners against Wackenhut, Keefe Commissary, and other cases.

== Criminal conspiracies ==
G.T. Enterprises, which held a no-bid Mississippi Department of Corrections (MDOC) contract for inmate services, beginning in 2006, was owned by Cecil McCrory. It had revenues of over $3.2 million in gross revenue in 2007 and 2008, through MDOC. McCrory sold the company to Keefe Commissary Network in November 2008 from which it earned over $40.4 million. The Keefe contract was renewed several times and was due to expire in August 2015. The contracts were signed by then-Commissioner Chris Epps. Keefe processed inmate deposits and inmate trust funds, and sales of prepaid debit cards. The contract also had given GT the right to sell commissary products at the Walnut Grove Youth Correctional Facility which McCrory's management company also operated. The company withheld 20% and 24% exclusive of sales tax from gross sales to inmates. The amount increased to 28% in 2007. Cecil McCrory also owned prisoner telephone providers Correctional Communications Inc and Mississippi Correctional Communications, Inc. The registered agent for both companies was Sam Waggoner III. Epps resigned as commissioner MDOC on November 5, 2014, during the federal investigation and the day before he and McCrory were indicted on federal charges of bribery and kickbacks. Epps had received what may have been more than $2 million in bribes from Cecil McCrory and others. McCrory had most recently been a consultant for Management and Training Corporation (MTC) of Utah, a major for-profit prison operating company; at the time, it had a $60 million contract in Mississippi to operate four prisons.

In February 2017, Mississippi Attorney General Jim Hood announced he had filed civil cases for damages and punitive damages against 11 corporations and individuals who had engaged in contracts with the MDOC and Epps. He said that state law required the companies and consultants to pay back the value of their contracts.

== Legal issues ==
On November 6, 2014 the office of the United States Attorney for the Southern District of Mississippi announced that it had indicted Epps on corruption charges related to his dealings with the for-profit prison industry. The federal indictment stated that Cecil McCrory, a Republican former state House member from 1988-1994 and a businessman who served as the chairperson of the Rankin County School District's board of education, paid Epps kickbacks and bribes totaling more than $1 million. His payments included payment of part of the mortgage of Epps' primary residence in the Jackson area. Epps leveraged the resulting increased equity together with another bribe payment to buy a condominium; he later traded up the latter for a larger, more expensive condo.

In exchange, Epps directed contracts to McCrory-owned companies, such as a no-bid contract to his G.T. Enterprises, which provided commissary services, as well as to companies that hired McCrory as a paid consultant. Per the indictment, the activity started in 2007 and ended on March 12, 2014. Epps entered an initial plea of not guilty, and he received a bond of $25,000. According to Leake County Sheriff Greg Waggoner, the investigation was initiated after an attempt by MDOC to cover-up a sexual assault of an inmate of a transitional facility in Walnut Grove, Mississippi. The FBI launched an investigation which eventually focused on Epps, naming it "Mississippi Hustle".

In November 2014 Governor Phil Bryant ordered rebids of the contracts that had been awarded by Epps. To review existing contracts, he appointed a 5-member task force, which included Mike Moore, a Democrat. Moore was Mississippi's Attorney General from 1988 to 2004. During the mid-1990s, he served on a board that oversaw prison construction projects authorized after the state was sued because of overcrowding and substandard conditions. Mississippi also was beginning to use for-profit contractors to operate some prisons, some of which were privately owned by such contractors. Bryant had received a $1,000 campaign contribution from McCrory. After learning of the indictments, he donated this money to the Salvation Army.

In February 2015 Epps pleaded guilty to corruption-related charges in a plea bargain: one count of filing a false tax return and one count of conspiracy to launder money.

Epps said he began taking gratuities from McCrory in 1997, before he became commissioner and while McCrory was still a state legislator.

McCrory plea bargained to lesser federal charges. He had long worked as a consultant to prison contractors: first to Cornell Companies of Houston, Texas, which built and operated the Walnut Grove Youth Correctional Facility in Mississippi, and the GEO Group (which acquired Cornell). McCrory received consulting fees from GEO's next successor, Utah's Management and Training Corporation. In 2015 MTC held a $60 million contract to operate four Mississippi prisons, including Wilkinson County Correctional Facility, which had previously been operated by the Corrections Corporation of America, now known as CoreCivic.

Upon the disclosure of the indictments, MTC fired McCrory, claiming they knew nothing of his criminal activities. According to the indictments, MTC confirmed that it paid McCrory $12,000 a month and had hired him at Epps’ recommendation. The company said that Epps had not forced it to hire McCrory. MTC spokesman Issa Arnita said that Epps “made us aware of the fee McCrory had charged in the past to other contractors” and that McCrory had worked for GEO Group, the Boca Raton, Florida for-profit prison firm, which had previously held the contracts in Mississippi that MTC was awarded. “MTC was not aware of any alleged inappropriate relationships between Mr. Epps and Mr. McCrory or that Mr. Epps was allegedly a participant in any way in the contract with McCrory.”

The indictment recounted a 2012 conversation between Epps and McCrory, quoting Epps as telling McCrory that he had persuaded MTC to hire him, and they were to split MTC's payments after taxes. According to the indictment, Epps said, “I got us $12,000 per month.”

Epps and McCrory blamed each other for beginning the bribery scheme. Their sentencing was first scheduled for June 9, 2015, but a day earlier, the U.S. Attorney for the Southern District of Mississippi said the sentencing was indefinitely delayed, as prosecutors were pursuing additional indictments.

The federal government indicted many others of those who allegedly bribed Epps, such as Mark Longoria, CEO of Drug Testing Corporation of Houston, Texas, who pleaded guilty in August 2016. Longoria was sentenced to five years in prison and fined $368,000 and ordered to forfeit $131,000 on February 14, 2017. He is being held at Federal Correctional Institution, Forrest City, Arkansas, with an anticipated release date of September 13, 2021.

Also charged were consultant Robert A. Simmons, and Teresa Malone, the wife of former Mississippi House Corrections Committee Chairman, Democrat Bennett Malone. In August 2016, the indictment of Guy E. "Butch" Evans was announced. In 2012 Evans had been awarded a contract as the insurance broker of record for the Mississippi Department of Corrections. He was given exclusive access to MDOC employees to sell policies and products. He received commissions from insurance companies and kicked back $1,400 to $1,700 per month to Epps for 16 months, starting in January 2013 and ending with the Epps indictment in mid-2014. On March 31, 2018, it was announced that Evans would waive indictment and plead guilty to a lesser offense, one that had not yet been charged. On January 9, 2017, Theresa Malone's trial was delayed, as she had suffered complications from a double lung transplant. On July 17, Malone changed her plea to guilty of the charges that involved her furnishing bribes, in amounts of $1000 to $1,750 to Epps through McCrory, in return for the continuance of the medical services vendor monitoring and Medicaid eligibility contracting which the state had with AdminPros, LLC. She was scheduled to be sentenced in September 2017. However, on January 9, 2018, the day before she was to be sentenced, Judge Wingate indefinitely delayed her sentencing due to her new hospitalization for additional transplant complications.

In April 2016, McCrory informed the court that he wanted to withdraw his plea bargain and change his plea to "not guilty", requesting a trial. As a consequence, the judge postponed Epps' sentencing to July 18, 2016. The sentencing of Epps and Brandon businessman McCrory scheduled for July 19, 2016, was delayed by Judge Wingate to give their defense lawyers additional time to review materials concerning how much money was gained by the 15 corporations paying bribes to the pair. Prosecutors hoped to use the evidence to increase the recommended prison sentences for Epps and McCrory. Epps faced a possible 23 years after his 2015 guilty plea to money laundering and filing false tax returns related to $1.47 million in bribes.

Numerous companies have denied knowing their consultants were making kickbacks to Epps and others. GEO's Finance Director John Tyrell testified that, "We often have consultants..." GEO had been paying McCrory $5,000 monthly, which retired President and Chief Operating Officer Wayne Calabrese subsequently doubled to $10,000. Two suits had been filed against the company based on conditions prevailing at the prison.

According to Assistant U.S. Attorney Darren LaMarca, at the time, ten more people could face federal indictments and another could face state charges, which had been expected by mid-July 2017. LaMarca estimated that the corruption's net benefit to contractors exceeded $65 million. Investigators have determined that Epps demanded bribes to exercise his influence, not only at the state level but also among county supervisors. By controlling the placement of state inmates in county facilities, Epps had influence over local jails. In poor rural areas, these were often considered a source of employment by local residents.

Cecil McCrory originally pleaded guilty to a single count of money laundering conspiracy and faced up to 20 years in prison. He agreed to forfeit $1.7 million in assets. Based on the prosecutors' $65 million estimate, federal sentencing guidelines would recommend a maximum of 23 years in prison for Epps. However, his lawyer asked the judge to sentence Epps based only on the value of the bribes he collected. If the lower amount of $1.47 million is used, Epps faced a recommended sentence between 14 and 17 1/2 years, giving Judge Wingate latitude. Because of his cooperation in providing information about those paying the bribes, prosecutors recommended that Epps get a shorter sentence. Quantifying assumed benefits to 16 contractors necessitated examining their accounts. On June 30, 2016, John Colette, Epps' defense attorney, said he received more than 1,500 pages of documents in the previous week and would require at least 30 days to review them. Four companies are asking Wingate to shield their information from public view: Four more had delayed responded to subpoenas. Wingate said he would hold a hearing by July 16, 2016, to consider requests for protective orders, and to consider contempt orders be lodged against companies which have failed to respond to disclosure requests.

Judge Wingate reset Epps' sentencing for May 24–25, 2017. Although Epps' sentencing was delayed, Wingate had set sentencing for his co-defendant, McCrory, for December 21–22. On December 21, 2016, Judge Wingate rejected McCrory's request to withdraw his plea, ruling it had been made with sufficient advice of counsel, and setting a new date for sentencing. It was revealed via testimony from the FBI that McCrory admitted to laundering $40,000 in cash for Epps in their first interview with him, and that he began wearing a covert listening device for recording his conversations with Epps. After he was sentenced to 8 1/2 years, on February 3, 2017, McCrory continued free on bail, with the judge indicating that time could be reduced after the other defendants in the case are sentenced. U.S. Attorney LaMarca characterized McCrory's cooperation as a "9" on a scale of "1-10." GEO had been paying McCrory $5,000 monthly, which President and Chief Operating Officer Wayne Calabrese, who retired in 2011, subsequently doubled. GEO's Finance Director Tyrrell did not give a definitive answer to the question regarding why the amount had increased. He speculated, however, that it might have been because on August 10, 2010, GEO Group, bought out Cornell Companies operations. Cornell operated the troubled Walnut Grove Youth Correctional Facility where it had been accused in a lawsuit of prisoners mistreatment. Its settlement included conversion of the prison to adults-only. McCrory's sentencing proceedings were postponed three times in 2017. Disputed issues concerned how much consideration he should receive for his cooperation, including his recording of conversations with other scheme participants. McCrory's imprisonment was delayed after his attorney requested that the amount of his initial prospective $150,000 fine be reduced. Wingate had already dropped it to $20,000. It was necessary for McCrory to liquidate assets to be able to pay the million-plus forfeiture sum. Mississippi Attorney General Jim Hood subpoenaed McCrory who provided a deposition in Hood's civil cases against corrupt companies and bureaucrats who obtained contracts while Epps' was MDOC Commissioner. This included the largest, Florida's GEO Group. The prosecutors expected a final judgment to include setting a new date for McCrory to report to prison. On May 25, 2017, when Judge Wingate gave Epps a federal prison sentence of 235 months (19.6 years). Wingate, who was appointed to the federal bench in 1985 said, "This is the largest graft operation that certainly I have seen, and I have seen a lot."

== Additional indictments ==
On July 20, 2016, in a seven-count indictment returned by a federal grand jury, Dr. Carl Reddix, an OB/GYN and owner of Health Assurance LLC, was charged with paying bribes and kickbacks to Epps in return for contract awards with the MDOC and for-profit prison operators. The attorney for Reddix said Epps demanded bribe payments, an assertion also made by other defendants. On January 19, 2017, businessman Sam Waggoner was sentenced to five years in federal prison with two years of supervised release and a $200,000 fine. Waggoner received 5 percent of the revenue as a consultant for Global Tel-Link, which provided phone services at Mississippi state prisons. He told the FBI that before their investigation started, he wrote Epps saying he wanted to end the payments. Epps ripped the letter into "teeny, tiny pieces," flushing it down a toilet, and telling him their arrangement would continue. Waggoner said: "He was basically my boss." Waggoner paid bribes from 2012 until at least Aug. 26, 2014. Epps personally received at least the $1.47 million in bribes for steering what LaMarca estimated was $800 million in contracts between 2006 and 2014. Judge Wingate heard the cases of the others who were charged with bribing Epps. Irb Benjamin represented Alcorn County as a Democrat in the state House from 1976–80 and the state Senate 1984-92. He later worked for Republican Lieutenant Governor Eddie Briggs, later a gubernatorial nominee. Alcorn County paid Benjamin, president and lobbyist for Mississippi Correctional Management (MCM), $114,000 a year for services to it, although he lived more than 200 miles away. The attorney for the Alcorn County Board of Supervisors said the supervisors were not required to seek bids before giving Benjamin the contract as warden, because it was a contract for services and was thus exempt from bid laws. Benjamin got $5,000 a month to handle accreditation by the American Correctional Association for the Alcorn's Regional Correctional Facility and another $4,500 a month as warden of the jail. He formed MCM in 1996, when the state Department of Corrections and counties started hiring private contractors to operate prisons and smaller regional jails. It operated the Grenada County jail for several years. Benjamin said the company also has jail accreditation contracts worth $4,000 or $5,000 a month with other counties, including Hancock, Holmes, Marion, Pearl River, Washington and Yazoo. In the past, he also worked as a $3,000-a-month jail consultant for DeSoto County. On June 8, 2008, the DeSoto County Board of Supervisors supervisors had approved his contract, noting: “Mr. Benjamin was recommended by Commissioner Epps at the state level.” Benjamin said that he was not aware that Epps had recommended him. Benjamin pleaded guilty to federal charges on October 18, 2016. He faced 10 years in prison, plus a fine of up to a quarter-million dollars. Judge Wingate sentenced him to 70 months in prison, fined him $100,000 and ordered him to forfeit $260,782. Benjamin, who said he was "pressured" by Epps, estimated that he paid the commissioner between $180,000 and $225,000 in cash bribes to secure support for the regional jails. His plea also covered bribes paid for drug and alcohol rehab programs which his company ran under contract to the state. LaMarca told Wingate, "it's just a matter of time" until others whom Benjamin informed upon were indicted. Benjamin is being held at the Federal Correctional Institution, Forrest City, Arkansas, with an anticipated release date of June 13, 2022.

On May 24, 2017, LaMarca indicated that six or seven investigations remained open, in Mississippi and Louisiana. An additional indictment had been obtained but remained sealed. At the time of the sentencing of Epps, LaMarca and John Colette, attorney for Epps, said his cooperation could lead to charges against the others, including conspirators from outside Mississippi. Before Judge Wingate pronounced his sentence in July 2017, he described Epps's conduct as, “staggering." He continued, “Mississippi is still in shock. It was an act of betrayal. He has bruised the image of Mississippi and given joy to many of the inmates he’s overseen who can now say the head of the state prison system was just as corrupt as any of them.” He sentenced Epps to 19 years in federal prison.

== State civil suits ==
On February 8, 2017, Mississippi Attorney General Jim Hood announced he had filed civil cases against 15 corporations and individuals who had engaged in contracts with the MDOC and Epps, seeking damages and punitive damages. He stated,

“The state of Mississippi has been defrauded through a pattern of bribery, kickbacks, misrepresentations, fraud, concealment, money laundering and other wrongful conduct.” He continued, “These individuals and corporations that benefited by stealing from taxpayers must not only pay the state's losses, but state law requires that they must also forfeit and return the entire amount of the contracts paid by the state. We are also seeking punitive damages to punish these conspirators and to deter those who might consider giving or receiving kickbacks in the future."

Besides Teresa Malone and Carl Reddix, the defendants included Michael Reddix (who had not been charged by the US Attorney); Andrew Jenkins; Management & Training Corporation; The GEO Group, Inc.; Cornell Companies, Inc.; Wexford Health Sources, Inc.; The Bantry Group Corporation; AdminPros, L.L.C.; CGL Facility Management, LLC; Mississippi Correctional Management, Inc.; Drug Testing Corporation; Global Tel*Link Corporation; Health Assurance, LLC; Keefe Commissary Network, LLC of St. Louis; Sentinel Offender Services, L.L.C.; AJA Management & Technical Services, Inc., and the Branan Medical Corporation; Those have accused at least 10 individuals and 11 out-of-state corporations of using so-called “consultants” to gain more than $800 million in Mississippi prison contracts.

On May 18, 2017, Hood announced that the state had quickly settled the first suit for two million dollars. The defendant was Alere Incorporated, which had purchased the Branan Medical Corporation. Lawsuits were filed against 10 individuals and 11 corporations accused of using so-called “consultants” in bribery schemes to gain more than $800 million in Mississippi prison contracts. On January 24, 2019, Hood announced his actions had recovered $27 million from those vendors against which he had filed suits. Management and Training Corporation paid $5.2 million. GEO Group paid $4.6 million, with the named defendant being Cornell Companies, which had been merged with GEO in 2010. Wexford Health Sources paid $4 million. Keefe Commissary Network paid $3.1 million. $3.1 million was paid by C.N.W. Construction Company. $750,000 was paid by CGL Facility Management, which provides maintenance services. $32,188 was received from AdminPros LLC, a Medicaid billing service. Insurance agent Guy E. “Butch” Evans paid $100,000. Health Assurance LLC, went bankrupt so did not pay the state.
