= Wilkinson County Correctional Center =

Private prison in unincorporated Wilkinson County, Mississippi

Coordinates: 31.1383°N 91.2773°W

- Interactive map of Wilkinson County Correctional Center
- Location: 2999 US-61 Woodville, Mississippi
- Status: open
- Security class: mixed
- Capacity: 900
- Opened: 1998
- Managed by: Management and Training Corporation (since 2013)

Wilkinson County Correctional Center (WCCC) is a private prison in unincorporated Wilkinson County, Mississippi, managed since July 2013 by Management and Training Corporation (MTC) on a five-year contract with the Mississippi Department of Corrections.

Established as a low to medium-security prison, it was converted to a maximum-security prison when prisoners were transferred in 2010 from the Mississippi State Penitentiary at Parchman. It has struggled since then with increasing levels of violence and murders of inmates. The prison facility has an authorized capacity of 900; it occupies 17.5 acres (7.1 ha) of enclosed area. The prison property is in total 97.5 acres (39.5 ha). As of November 2016, it is one of four private prisons under contract to the state of Mississippi. A fifth, Walnut Grove Correctional Facility, closed in September 2016.

State contracts with MTC and the previous operator, Corrections Corporation of America (CCA), have been under investigation in what is known as Operation Mississippi Hustle, a wide-ranging corruption case investigated by the FBI. Former Commissioner Chris Epps was indicted in November 2014 (the day after he resigned), as was Cecil McCrory, a consultant and former state legislator. Both pleaded guilty in February 2015 and have cooperated with investigators. Numerous other figures have been indicted; some have pleaded guilty and others convicted at trial. In February 2017, Mississippi State Attorney announced a civil suit against the private prison operators and numerous other contractors, for damages and punitive damages.

== History ==
The private prison opened in January 1998. The low to medium-security prison was originally managed by Corrections Corporation of America (CCA, now CoreCivic). The state and county authorized construction of the prison in this location in the expectation that persons living in the Woodville area would be able to find jobs there.

During reforms at Mississippi State Penitentiary (MSP or "Parchman") in Sunflower County, as part of settlement of a class action suit, the state closed Unit 32, which included the prison's Death Row and other prisoners in lockdown. Numerous prisoners with mental illness were transferred to East Mississippi Correctional Facility, which is to provide specialized treatment. Other prisoners were transferred to WCCC to improve their conditions, and the facility was converted to maximum-security level.

But, the rate of violence began to rise at WCCC due to the influx of prison gang leaders and members from Unit 32. Eighty-six percent of prisoners at Wilkinson now belong to gangs for protection. WCCC became known as the "New Unit 32" and "The Killing Field." The violence rate at WCCC from 2011 through June 2013, under CCA management, exceeded any state-operated prisons. Raymond Byrd had become warden, transferred in 2012 after the closure of Delta Correctional Facility, also in Mississippi, until the contract was lost to Management and Training Corporation, in July 2013.

=== Recent violence ===
On April 20, 2013, inmate Demond Flowers was stabbed in the heart by members of Gangster Disciples and Vice Lords. Prison officials had ended a lockdown the previous day that was used to suppress violence after an incident of gang conflict. Flowers' family filed suit against CCA, settling for an undisclosed amount.

In 2013 MDOC commissioner Chris Epps replaced CCA, awarding MTC a five-year contract to manage WCCC. This was effective July 1, 2013, at the beginning of the state's fiscal year. In mid-2012, MTC had been awarded a contract to manage three other private prisons in the state: East Mississippi Correctional Facility, Marshall County Correctional Facility, and Walnut Grove Correctional Facility (WGCF). It took over these facilities from the GEO Group, which was forced out as part of a settlement of a class-action suit over conditions at WGCF. The fifth private prison is Tallahatchie County Correctional Facility, managed by CCA for the state.

The violence rate at WCCC did not decline after the new management took over, although the company says that it is making improvements. A prisoner at WCCC is estimated to have a one-in-seven chance of experiencing assault, exceeding the one-in-fourteen chance of a prisoner held at Parchman. In October 2014 journalist Jerry Mitchell of The Clarion Ledger stated that if WCCC was a city of 100,000, it would have murders of more than 111 people per year. Mitchell said this was twice the homicide rate of the city of Detroit, which had an annual murder rate of 54.6 per 100,000.

On May 25, 2014, inmate Kendrick Walker was stabbed 81 times, resulting in his death. Convicted of a non-violent crime, he had been a year from release after serving a 10-year sentence. A videotape suggests that tower guards contributed to his death, but none was prosecuted. The warden took nearly 27 minutes to reach the tier with backup; by then Walker was dead.

Former MDOC Commissioner Robert L. Johnson had opposed Mississippi contracting for private prisons. After viewing the videotape of the assault on Walker, he said, "Honestly, I think it is symptomatic of the profit motive that drives a lot of the corrections industry instead of concern for public safety."

According to the Clarion-Ledger, CCA has annual revenues surpassing $1.7 billion, and "a CEO pulling down more than $3.2 million in salary and benefits. MTC, which began managing the prison in summer 2013, earns annual revenues exceeding $525 million."

== MDOC and contractor corruption case ==
Chris Epps resigned as Commissioner of MDOC in early November 2014. The next day he was indicted by the US Attorney of the Southern District of Mississippi, together with consultant and former state legislator Cecil McCrory, on 49 counts of bribery and kickbacks, in a corruption scheme related to contracts that Epps steered to particular companies. In February 2015 both men pleaded guilty in plea bargains and cooperated with FBI investigators in a far-reaching case known as Operation Mississippi Hustle. Epps is estimated to have been paid $1.47 million in bribes and kickbacks in the previous decade, based on $800 million in contracts. Additional indictments, guilty pleas and convictions have taken place. The unfolding nature of the case and trials of other figures delayed sentencing for Epps, now scheduled for late May 2017. McCrory was sentenced to 8 1/2 years in prison in February 2017.

In February 2017, Mississippi Attorney General Jim Hood announced he had filed civil cases against 15 corporations and numerous individuals who had engaged in contracts with the MDOC and Epps, seeking damages and punitive damages. Among the companies named were MTC, GEO Group, and CCA.
