= SMCI =

SMCI may refer to:

- NASDAQ ticker symbol for Supermicro, a technology company
- South Mississippi Correctional Institution, a prison in Mississippi
