= Federal Correctional Institution, Talladega =

Federal prison in Alabama, United States

Coordinates: 33°25′14″N 86°08′24″W

FCI Talladega
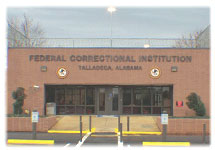
- Interactive map of FCI Talladega
- Location: Talladega, Alabama
- Status: Operational
- Security class: Medium-security (with minimum-security prison camp)
- Population: 1,049 (277 in prison camp)
- Managed by: Federal Bureau of Prisons

The Federal Correctional Institution (FCI Talladega) is a medium-security United States federal prison for male inmates in Talladega, Alabama. It is operated by the Federal Bureau of Prisons, a division of the United States Department of Justice. The facility also includes an adjacent minimum-security satellite camp that also houses male offenders.

FCI Talladega is located approximately 50 miles from Birmingham, Alabama and 100 miles from Atlanta, Georgia.

== 1991 inmate rebellion ==
On August 21, 1991, 121 Cuban inmates who had been incarcerated since the 1980 Mariel boatlift rioted and took over the facility in an effort to block their deportation to Cuba. Most of the prison staff who were on duty at the time escaped, but nine staff members, seven men and two women, were forced to barricade themselves in a room with mattresses. A ten-day standoff ensued, during which federal negotiators conducted two face-to-face meetings with the inmates, who released a sick hostage in exchange for a chance to speak with a reporter. However, the inmates repeatedly threatened to kill the other hostages if their scheduled deportation to Cuba was not cancelled. Sanitary conditions were rapidly deteriorating inside the prison and some hostages, using hand signals during a food delivery and medical visit, conveyed their fear to prison officials earlier that the inmates were discussing specific plans "to throw a hostage from the roof and to stab one or more hostages." Based on that information, US Deputy Attorney General William P. Barr, FBI Director William S. Sessions, and Bureau of Prisons director J. Michael Quinlan authorized the FBI Hostage Rescue Team to storm the facility.

At 3:43 AM on August 31, 1991, several loud explosions were heard inside Cell Block Alpha, the section of the prison where the hostages were being held. A team of about 200 specially trained agents had converged on the cell building at a number of points using explosives to break open doors. Once inside, they detonated a number of stun grenades, devices that issue a huge flash and shockwave intended to temporarily incapacitate anyone caught in the blast. By 3:46 AM, the agents had freed the hostages and taken all 121 inmates into custody.

== Notable inmates (current and former) ==
Inmate Name	Register Number	Status	Details
Eric Ian Baker	18692-075	Released February 15, 2021.	Member of the white supremacist group Aryan Nations; pleaded guilty to arson in connection with the 2008 firebombing of the Islamic Center of Columbia in Columbia, Tennessee; two accomplices were also sentenced to prison.
Clarence Heatley	39015-054	Serving a life sentence.	Leader of the Preacher Crew, a New York City street gang; pleaded guilty in 1999 to racketeering and conspiracy for directing gang members to commit murders, narcotics trafficking, extortion, robberies and kidnappings in the Bronx and Manhattan.
Scott Maddox	26266-017	Released May 9, 2023.	Former Tallahassee City Commissioner, convicted in 2018 for bribery.
Jonathan James	34472-086	Served a six-month sentence, released in 2002; Deceased in 2008.	First juvenile incarcerated for cybercrime, served his sentence here after violating his probation by possessing drugs.
Cecil McCrory	18156-043	Serving an 8 1/2-year sentence, with a scheduled release in 2024. Currently in the custody of RRM Montgomery.	With his crime partner, former Mississippi state corrections director Chris Epps, ex-state legislator McCrory shook down for-profit prison operators and subcontractors for over a million dollars in bribes.
Kyle Myers	00970-120	Released on October 3, 2019 after serving an 8-week sentence.	Possessed marijuana.
Joe Biggs	26257-509	Sentenced to 17 years. Released after sentence was commuted by President Donald J. Trump on January 20, 2025.	Participant in the January 6 United States Capitol attack.
Josh Pillault	15362-042	Released on January 11, 2020 after serving five years of a six-year sentence.	Accused of, and charged with, knowingly and willfully communicating a threat by means of the internet, an instrument of interstate and foreign commerce, concerning an attempt to kill and injure individuals and unlawfully damage and destroy buildings by means of fire and explosives.
Kentrell Gaulden	01007-506	Released March 24, 2025.	Served a federal sentence for possession of firearms by a convicted felon; transferred to FCI Talladega in February 2025 and released in March 2025.
