= Mississippi Department of Corrections =

State agency that operates prisons

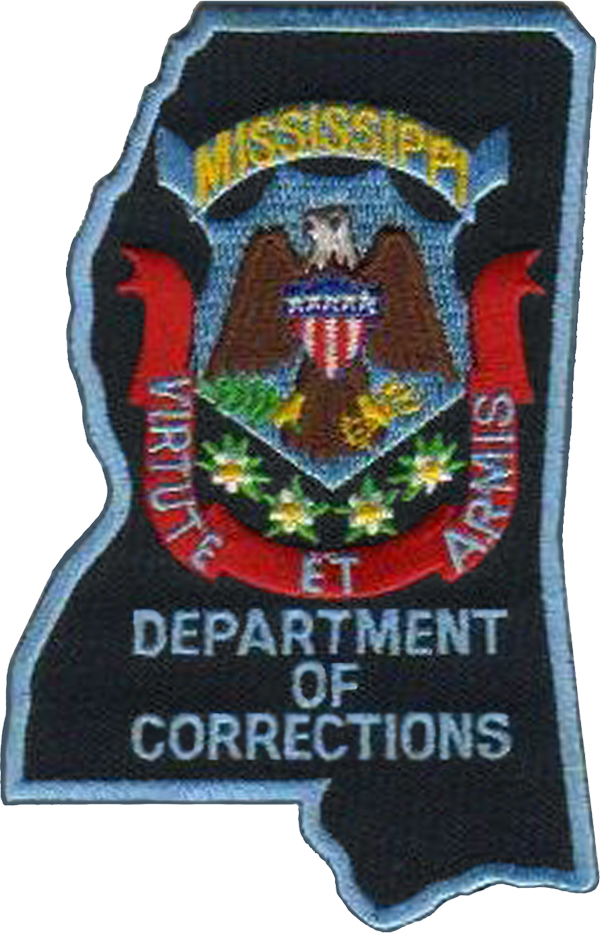

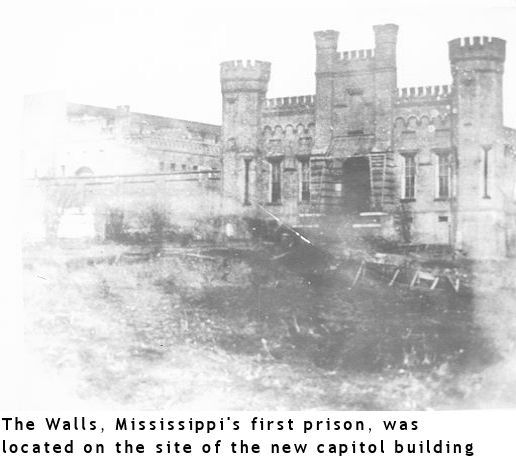
- "The Walls" was Mississippi's first prison, located in central Jackson.

State agency overview
- Formed: 1976
- Jurisdiction: Mississippi
- Headquarters: Jackson
- Annual budget: $389 million
- State agency executive: Burl Cain, Commissioner
- Website: Mississippi Department of Corrections

Map
- Mississippi Prisons — green=state-operated, red==private (Hover mouse over pog to popup clickable link)

The Mississippi Department of Corrections (MDOC) is a state agency of Mississippi that operates prisons. It has its headquarters in Jackson. As of 2020 Burl Cain is the commissioner.

== History ==
In 1843 a penitentiary in four city squares in central Jackson was developed as Mississippi's first state prison.

The prison in Jackson was destroyed during the Civil War, and the state did not replace it for decades. Instead, the state conducted convict leasing, leasing prisoners to third parties for their labor. The lessees held custody of the inmates and provided their room and board, often substandard. The state made substantial amounts of money from these arrangements, which created an incentive to have minor infractions criminalized in order to arrest more people and sentence them. Increasing the number of crimes for which persons could be arrested, such as vagrancy, resulted in an increased pool of prisoners to lease out, as many could not raise enough cash to pay fines or fees that were sometimes imposed. Most prisoners were freedmen; the state used this system to extract labor from former slaves and keep them suppressed socially. The state officially changed its policy at the end of the 19th century, saying that prisoners sentenced by the State could no longer be hired or leased by third parties, effective after December 31, 1894.

After ending the convict leasing system, the State of Mississippi began to acquire property to build prisons. The state bought the Rankin Farm in 1895 in Rankin County, 12 miles (19 km) from Jackson; it is now the site of the Central Mississippi Correctional Facility. Later the state purchased the Oakley Farm, located in Hinds County, 25 miles (40 km) from Jackson. The state government purchased land in Sunflower County in January 1901, where it developed the Parchman Farm (now Mississippi State Penitentiary). The prison properties were largely self-sufficient, raising their own crops and livestock, as well as commodity crops such as cotton for the state to sell. All the labor was by prisoners.

The state Department of Corrections was established in 1976 to oversee the existing Mississippi state prisons. Both federal and state laws were passed during various campaigns of "wars on crime" and "wars on drugs;" not only were new behaviors criminalized, but politicians supported mandatory sentencing and lengthier sentences. By the end of the 20th century, Mississippi had one of the largest state prison systems in the country, with a rising number of persons incarcerated even as crime rates fell. A disproportionate number and percentage of African Americans and other people of color have been incarcerated under these policies.

In addition to the major state prisons, the state developed many community detention centers for prisoners with lower security classifications. They were provided as workers to numerous locales, in part to prepare them for reintegration into society after release. Because of the dramatic climb in the number of prisoners and demand for space, the state legislature authorized MDOC to enter into contracts with for-profit prison management companies for the construction and operation of private prisons in the state. By the early 21st century, the state had contracts with operators of six private prisons.

Civil rights groups and prisoner advocates have filed class-action suits in efforts to improve prison conditions and protect prisoner rights. As a result of such a suit against Unit 32 (Death Row lockdown unit) at Mississippi State Penitentiary, the state and the ACLU worked out a settlement in 2006 that changed processes and dramatically reduced the use of punitive solitary confinement in the state.

In 2009 and 2014, the state passed legislation to provide more flexibility in sentencing and parole of certain classes of prisoners, reducing the prison population and returning non-violent offenders earlier to their families and communities.

=== Rise of private prisons ===
Changes in sentencing laws dramatically increased the prison population. In 1995 the state legislature passed a law requiring all prisoners to serve 85% of their sentence. The prison population more than doubled from 1995 to 2007, from 11,250 to 22,800, far outstripping capacity of the three state prisons.

Beginning in the late 20th century, the state dealt with the rising need to incarcerate individuals by contracting with private prison management companies, who built and operated a total of six prisons for state prisoners in Mississippi. Corrections Corporation of America and Cornell Companies were two early contractors; the latter was acquired by GEO Group in 2010, which took over its three contracts in Mississippi. Prisoners and their families made numerous complaints about conditions in these facilities, citing high rates of violence and sexual abuse, rampant drugs, lack of medical care and education, and other problems.

Class action suits were filed by the Southern Poverty Law Center and the ACLU National Prison Project against two private facilities with the most egregious conditions: they filed suit against Walnut Grove Youth Correctional Facility in 2010. This case was settled in federal court in 2012, requiring the state to quickly transfer youth offenders to a state-run facility to be operated according to juvenile justice standards. They were transferred to Central Mississippi Correctional Facility. In addition, the state was prohibited from using solitary confinement for any youthful offender. WGCF was converted to be used for adults only. MDOC ended its contract with GEO Group, awarding a 10-year contract to Management and Training Corporation for Walnut Grove and two other private facilities, effective July 1, 2012. The court supervision of conditions at WGCF was extended because of two prison riots in 2014. Due to declining need, the state closed the prison in September 2016.

The ACLU and SPLC filed suit against the East Mississippi Correctional Facility, established for prisoners with serious mental illness, in 2013. The class-action suit at East Mississippi Correctional Facility is proceeding; the court affirmed the status of the plaintiffs in 2015.

=== Sentencing, control and parole reforms ===
At the same time, the state was seeking to reduce the prison population. Studies had found that minor reductions in length of sentence did not affect the rate of recidivism, showing that prisoners could be paroled earlier for certain types of crimes without affecting public safety. In 2008, the state passed SB 2136, to enable non-violent prisoners to again be eligible for parole after they had served 25% of their sentence. The new law was estimated to affect "approximately 4,500 inmates, or about 25% of the 22,800 total population. A unique feature of SB 2136 was that it was applied retroactively in order to have an immediate impact on the prison population and to ensure equity in the sentencing process. About 3,000 inmates or 12% of the total population had already met their time-served requirement and were immediately eligible for parole consideration." To aid prison officials and parole boards in assessing candidates, the Bureau of Justice Assistance developed a science-based risk assessment instrument to apply.

By August 2009, some 3100 prisoners had been paroled from prison. The Board's use of the new risk assessment instrument resulted in their having a higher rate of parole approval. The parole revocation rate has not changed, and in the first year, only 5 of the people returned to prison for new crimes, a rate of 0.2% that was a fraction of the national rate of 10.5%. Legislative amendments have been passed in 2009 increased the ability of MDOC to reduce the number of prisoners; one of these authorized the department to place most "persons convicted of most drug crimes to be placed under house arrest with electronic monitoring.

=== Closing of private facilities ===
Both the state and private prison operators have had difficulty maintaining staffing in prisons because of low wages and high turnover. By 2011, MDOC operated below capacity due to the success of its efforts to reduce the prison population. As of 2011, the state prisons were below capacity by more than 2,000 spaces. With private prisons included, that was about 4,000 beds below capacity.

MDOC closed the Delta Correctional Facility in January 2012, and Walnut Grove Correctional Facility in September 2016. By early 2017 Mississippi had no state prisoners at the for-profit Tallahatchie County Correctional Facility; the prison operator CCA had contracts with California and other states to house their prisoners at this privately owned site.

By March 2017, MDOC was using only three privately run prisons for its inmates. In early 2017, Interim Commissioner Pelicia Hall (appointed in March 2017 as Commissioner) conducted raids for contraband at these private prisons, collecting much material. She is determined to reduce the traffic in contraband, which contributes to corruption in the prisons, including among the guards and staff.

=== Operation Mississippi Hustle ===
As a result of a five-year statewide investigation known as Operation Mississippi Hustle, in November 2014 the federal Department of Justice announced indictments of former Corrections Commissioner Chris Epps (who resigned the day before) and Cecil B. McCrory, a businessman and former Republican state legislator, on 49 counts of corruption, bribery and kickbacks. Newspaper reports have indicated widespread corruption related to contracts for prison services, and within the prisons themselves. This includes millions paid in bribes related to awarding of state contracts, drugs and other contraband being smuggled into facilities by the guards, sex between staff and inmates, and other abuses. Epps was charged with receiving $1.47 million in bribes and kickbacks, related to $800 million worth of state contracts made over about a decade.

Both Epps and McCrory pleaded guilty in 2015 and cooperated with investigators on identifying others responsible. Eight other indictments followed, with one waived and more expected. Defendants include consultant and businessman Robert Simmons, who was sentenced to 87 months; former mayor of Walnut Grove, Mayor William Grady Sims, who was prosecuted earlier and sentenced to 7 months; former legislator and Republican businessman Sam Waggoner, former Harrison County Supervisor William Martin, who committed suicide before arraignment; former Alcorn County warden and Democratic state Senator Irb Benjamin, Dr. Carl Reddix, Terese Malone, Mark Longoria, and Guy "Butch" Evans.

On February 8, 2017, Mississippi Attorney General, Democrat Jim Hood, announced he had filed civil cases against 15 corporations (including those that had operated Walnut Grove Youth Correctional Facility and had provided other services to prisons) and numerous individuals who had engaged in contracts with the MDOC and Epps, seeking damages and punitive damages. Hood said,

These individuals and corporations that benefited by stealing from taxpayers must not only pay the state's losses, but state law requires that they must also forfeit and return the entire amount of the contracts paid by the state. We are also seeking punitive damages to punish these conspirators and to deter those who might consider giving or receiving kickbacks in the future." Besides Teresa Malone and Carl Reddix, the defendants included Michael Reddix; Andrew Jenkins; Management & Training Corporation; The GEO Group, Inc.; Cornell Companies, Inc.; Wexford Health Sources, Inc.; The Bantry Group Corporation; AdminPros, L.L.C.; CGL Facility Management, LLC; Mississippi Correctional Management, Inc.; Branan Medical Corporation; Drug Testing Corporation; Global Tel*Link Corporation; Health Assurance, LLC; Keefe Commissary Network, LLC of St. Louis; Sentinel Offender Services, L.L.C. and AJA Management & Technical Services, Inc.

=== Commissioner appointments ===
In March 2017, Pelicia E. Hall was appointed by Governor Phil Bryant as Commissioner; she is the first woman to hold this position. An attorney, she has extensive criminal justice and private law experience. In 2020 Burl Cain became the commissioner.

== Divisions ==
- Division of Institutions: Operates prisons
  - Agricultural Enterprises: Oversees agricultural operations at the Mississippi State Penitentiary (MSP) and South Mississippi Correctional Institution (SMCI). The majority of MDOC's farming occurs at MSP.
  - Division of Classification & Offender Services: Assigns prisoners to security classifications
- Community Corrections Division: Supervises parole and probation

== Operations ==
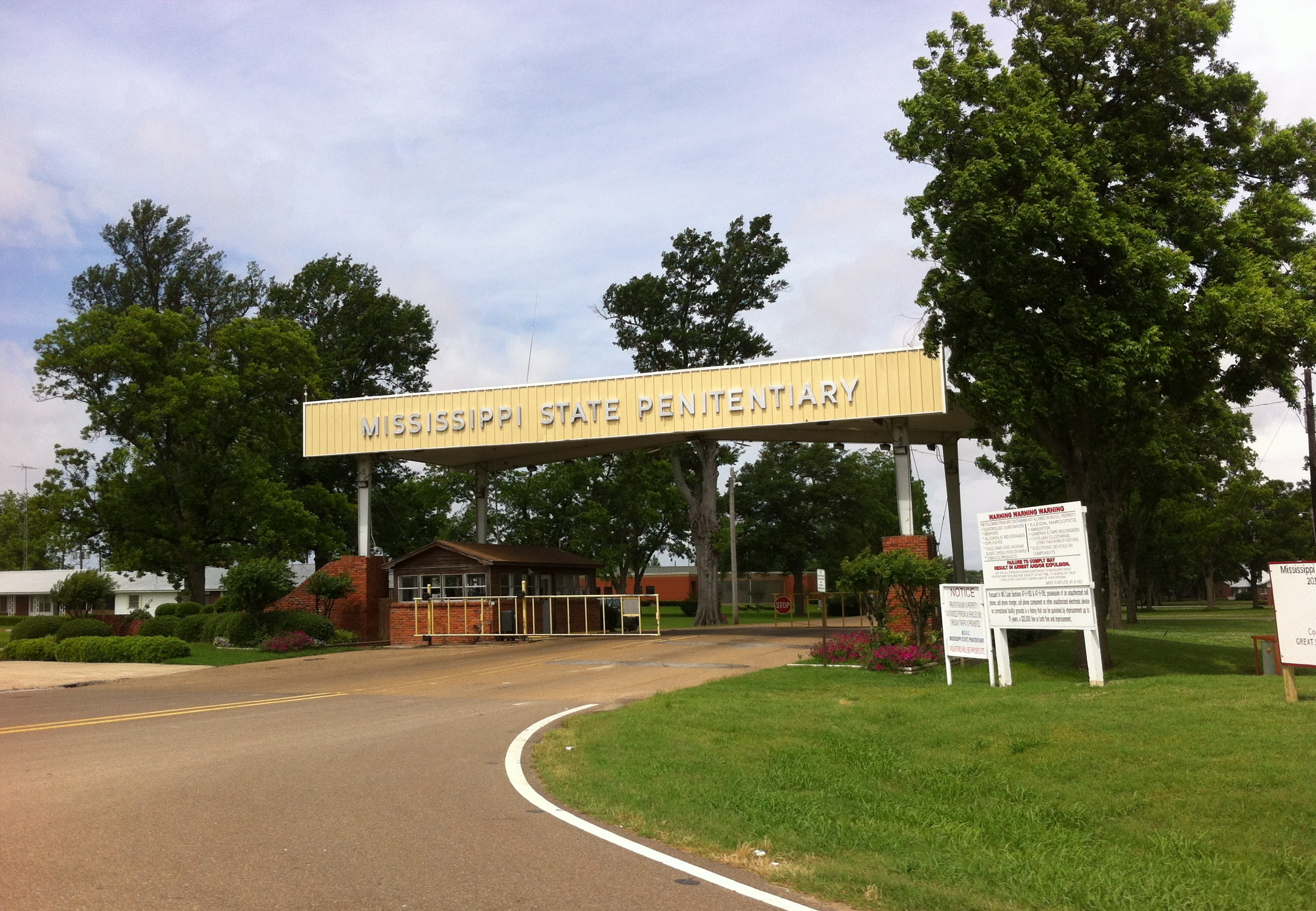
Mississippi State Penitentiary

Before going to their assigned facilities and after their transfer from county jails, most prison inmates are sent to the Reception & Classification Center (R&C) in the Central Mississippi Correctional Facility (CMCF) in Rankin County to be classified according to behavior level and assessed for treatment. The classification process takes around 30 days.

Most male inmates who are sentenced to MDOC by the courts or who are returned to MDOC as parole violators, probation violators, intensive supervision program (ISP) (house arrest) violators, earned release supervision (ERS) violators, and suspension violators are placed at R&C. All women inmates who are sentenced to MDOC by the courts or who are returned to MDOC as parole violators, probation violators, ISP violators, ERS violators, and suspension violators are placed in 1A or 2B at CMCF. Male death row inmates transferred from county jails immediately are sent to the Mississippi State Penitentiary, the location of the male death row.

Each prisoner receives a security classification. The classifications are:

- Minimum (Community)
- Minimum (Non-Community)
- Medium
- Close
- Death Row

In November 2014, media reports indicated the department housed each prisoner at a cost of about $42.12 per day, one of the lowest costs in the nation.

=== Health care ===
The system's chief medical officer is Gloria Perry. She has been in that position since 2008. She is certified in family-practice.

MDOC contracts with Centurion of Mississippi, LLC. Previously, MDOC contracted with Wexford Health Sources, Inc., headquartered in Green Tree, Pennsylvania, near Pittsburgh. Wexford provides medical services to inmates at state-operated facilities. Each privately operated facility has its own contracted medical services provider.

Wexford was awarded the $95 million MDOC contract in 2006. Previously MDOC contracted with Correctional Medical Services (CMS), headquartered in Creve Coeur, Missouri, near St. Louis. CMS's contract began on July 1, 2003.

=== Intensive Supervision Program ===
MDOC's Intensive Supervision Program (ISP) is the authority's house arrest program.

=== Death row ===
MDOC performs executions at the Mississippi State Penitentiary. Male death row offenders are housed in the Mississippi State Penitentiary, while female death row offenders are housed in the Central Mississippi Correctional Facility.

=== Conjugal and family visits ===
The Mississippi state prison system ended conjugal visits in February 2014. The commissioner at the time, Chris Epps, argued that the possibility of creating single parents and the expenses were the reasons why conjugal visits ended.

=== Employment programs ===
Previously MDOC contracted prisoners to local and county governments, in essence paying a subsidy to the jurisdictions to manage the prisoners. The prisoners, often classified as trusties, would get reductions in their sentences in exchange for doing work. On April 30, 2015 MDOC stated that it would end this program and save $3.2 million per year. Many jurisdictions have complained they will be unable to replace the labor of the prisoners.

=== Costs of state prisons ===
In 2014, media reported that Commissioner Chris Epps had said that the department housed each prisoner at a cost of about $42.12 per day, one of the lowest costs in the nation. He also noted that the state's recidivism rate was among the "lowest in the nation."

But, the state spends more than $15,000 annually for each prisoner, about three times what it spends for each school student. In 2013, the agency budget for prisons was about $389 million, according to the Brookings Institution. Journalist Jerry Mitchell explored the consensus by experts who have found that the state could keep more people out of prison by stressing good education from a young age, and recommended improving schools in poor rural areas rather than building prisons. African Americans are incarcerated at a rate three times that of whites in the state but could be helped by good education from a young age.

Prison guards start at just twelve dollars an hour. They receive just six week's training.

=== Recidivism ===
Nationwide, the Bureau of Justice Statistics (of the US Department of Justice) says that about three-quarters of those released from prison are arrested again in the next five years. That figure spans a wide range of actions for which a person may be arrested. Mississippi measures its recidivism differently: whether a person released from prison is convicted of another crime and imprisoned within three years. Based on those criteria, its recidivism rate is about 33%. Its parolees have had considerable success after the state officials adopted a risk assessment instrument in 2009, to evaluate which candidates for parole under a new law designed to reduce the prison population of persons convicted of non-violent crime.

== Demographics ==
As of September 1, 2008, the Mississippi Department of Corrections has 26,274 inmates in its custody. 17,677 (67.28%) are Black, 8,269 (31.47%) are White, 236 (0.9%) are Hispanic, 43 (.16%) are Asian, 27 (.01%) are Native American, and 22 (.06%) have that data unavailable. Of the 23,692 male inmates, 16,366 (69.08%) are Black, 7,030 (29.67%) are White, 222 (.94%) are Hispanic, 35 (.15%) are Asian, 23 (.1%) are Native American, and 16 (.07%) have that data unavailable. Of the 2,582 female inmates, 1,311 (50.77%) are Black, 1,239 (47.99%) are White, 14 (.54%) are Hispanic, 8 (.31%) are Asian, 4 (.15%) are Native American, and 6 (.23%) have that data unavailable.

== Facilities ==
=== State prisons ===
These were constructed in unincorporated areas:

- Central Mississippi Correctional Facility (Rankin County)
- Delta Correctional Facility
- Marshall County Correctional Facility
- Mississippi State Penitentiary (Sunflower County, formerly known as Parchman Farm)
- South Mississippi Correctional Institution (Leakesville)
- Walnut Grove Correctional Facility

=== Joint county/regional ===
- Bolivar County Correctional Facility
- Carroll-Montgomery County/Regional Correctional Facility
- George-Greene County/Regional Correctional Facility
- Holmes-Humphreys County/Regional Correctional Facility
- Issaquena County Correctional Facility
- Jefferson-Franklin County/Regional Correctional Facility
- Kemper-Neshoba County/Regional Correctional Facility
- Leake County Correctional Facility
- Marion-Walthall County/Regional Correctional Facility
- Stone County Correctional Facility
- Winston-Choctaw County/Regional Correctional Facility

=== Private prisons ===
Since 2012, MDOC has reduced the number of prisoners it has in private prisons due to an overall reduction of prisoners in the state, aided by changes to sentencing and parole laws in 2008 and 2014. As of March 2017, three private prisons hold Mississippi prisoners:

- East Mississippi Correctional Facility (EMCF) -(unincorporated Lauderdale County) - Operated since July 2012 on a 10-year contract by Management and Training Corporation (MTC), which replaced GEO Group. East Mississippi is the state's main "special needs" facility (for inmates with disabilities and/or severe mental illness).
- Marshall County Correctional Facility (MCCF)- Operated by GEO Group until June 2012; now under 10-yr contract to MTC.
- Wilkinson County Correctional Center (WCCC) - Operated by CCA through early 2013; since 2013 by MTC.

The remaining three are closed for MDOC operations.

- Delta Correctional Facility (Greenwood) - Opened, formerly operated by Corrections Corporation of America (CCA) - Facility suspended January 2012
- Tallahatchie County Correctional Facility (in unincorporated Tallahatchie County) - Opened, operated by Corrections Corporation of America (CCA); as of January 2017 holding no Mississippi inmates, but prisoners from California.
- Walnut Grove Correctional Facility Walnut Grove, (formerly the Walnut Grove Youth Correctional Facility) - Opened 2001 and operated by Cornell Corrections 2003–2010, then GEO Group until June 2012. Operated as an adult facility under 10-yr contract by MTC July 2012-September 16, 2016, when it was closed.

== Prisoner rules ==
Men may have hair that is not more than 3 inches (76 mm) in length. Men may have beards and goatees up to .5 inches (13 mm) in length.

=== Prisoner uniforms ===
Most prisoner outfits are striped. As of 1997, green stripes indicate lower security prisoners, black stripes indicate prisoners with a level higher than the ones with green stripes, and red stripes indicate high security prisoners.

Reception and Classification Center inmates wear yellow jumpsuits. Condemned prisoners are required to wear red jumpsuits.

== Fallen officers ==
Since the establishment of the Mississippi Department of Corrections, six officers have died in the line of duty.

== Media campaigns ==
The New Jersey Department of Corrections, the state prison system of New Jersey, established the "Be Smart Choose Freedom" television advertisement campaign in 2005. The State of New Jersey produced 30–60 second public service announcements to warn state residents against going to prison. MDOC decided to start its own "Be Smart Choose Freedom" campaign and use the commercials that aired in New Jersey.

== See also ==
- List of law enforcement agencies in Mississippi
- List of United States state correction agencies
- List of U.S. state prisons
- Prison
