= Frank Prewitt =

American lawyer

James Franklin Prewitt (January 31, 1949 – September 7, 2020) was an American attorney and government affairs consultant. He was a confidential source upon whom the Federal Bureau of Investigation (FBI) relied to help prosecute "Operation Polar Pen", the Alaska political corruption probe that eventually ensnared United States Senator Ted Stevens. Prewitt was the author of Last Bridge to Nowhere, a creative non-fiction book that describes his involvement as an FBI source.

== Early years ==
James Franklin Prewitt, also known as Frank, was born in Berkeley, California on January 31, 1949. He was the youngest of three children born to Catherine and James Prewitt, co-founder of Western Baptist College (now Corban University) in Salem, Oregon. He attended public and international schools in the San Francisco Bay Area and Israel and earned a Bachelor of Science degree from Corban College, a Master of Science degree from the University of Oregon and Juris Doctor degree from the University of Puget Sound School of Law.

During graduate school Frank served as a Trooper with the Oregon State Police (OSP). In his final semester of law school he was appointed legal extern to retired United States District Court Judge James Singleton and during the 1970s and 1980s taught justice courses as adjunct faculty for Anchorage Community College.

== Government service ==
In thirteen years of public service to the State of Alaska, Prewitt served as the Director of the Alaska Psychiatric Institute, Commissioner of the Alaska Department of Corrections and Assistant Alaska Attorney General.

When the State of Alaska's only Psychiatric Hospital was at risk of losing accreditation, Governor Walter Hickel appointed Prewitt CEO, relying on his "exceptional management skills" to successfully re-organize and re-focus the hospital as a provider of quality inpatient and outpatient mental health services.

Prewitt served under, and at the will of three successive Alaska Governors (Bill Sheffield, Steve Cowper and Walter Hickel). In his final year of public service, editorial writers of Alaska's largest newspaper twice applauded Commissioner Prewitt for his, "unusually level-headed approach to the high charged issue of crime…when he argues 'adding police and prosecutors, without giving equal attention to prevention, custody and treatment alternatives may be tough-minded, but it's also soft-headed and fiscally irresponsible."

== Private practice ==
In 1995 Prewitt established a private consulting and lobbying practice advising and representing human service organizations pursuing business partnerships, outsourcing opportunity, funding, statutory and regulatory changes with Alaska state and local government.

From 1998 to 2004 Prewitt was the consulting government affairs and corrections expert for corporate partnerships proposing construction and operation of for-profit correctional facilities in Alaska, Oregon and Washington. The venture rotated through a succession of corporate principals including Allvest Inc, GEO Group (formerly Wackenhut), Cornell Corrections, Chugach Alaska Corporation (Alaska Native Regional Corporation), VECO International, Inc, Kenai Native Association, Neeser Construction and the architectural firms of Koonce Pfeffer Bettis and Livingston-Slone.

== Combating political corruption ==
From 2004 to 2007, Prewitt worked with undercover investigators as an FBI confidential source, exposing Alaska's sub-culture of political corruption.

On October 10, 2007 the Anchorage Daily News reported, "After court on Thursday, prosecutor Joe Bottini took the unusual step of singling out prosecution witness Frank Prewitt, who has been working undercover for the FBI since 2004…his work helped investigators get the evidence they needed for wiretaps and bugs in Suite 604 of (Juneau's) Baranof Hotel. Bottini said that Prewitt has done a 'tremendous job' for the government, 'we owe him a lot, frankly'."

Two of the early private prisons venture partners were caught up in the ongoing Alaska political corruption probe leading to blogger and press speculation that Prewitt's service to the federal government may have been the result of a secret plea agreement although no formal charges were placed. Prewitt contends his participation with the FBI began after he was cleared. He wore a wire to record conversations in meetings with probe targets. Court documents filed on March 22, 2010 in a criminal appeal indicated that Prewitt had been paid $200,000 for his assistance.

In the trial of ex-Representative Tom Anderson, Prewitt explained how he was willing to go undercover for the feds to try to ease his own criminal exposure in unrelated investigations. Counsel for Anderson, Paul Stockler, said Anderson assisted Cornell, a private prison company, without compensation from the time the investigation was initiated, but it was only after the Hickel administration's former Corrections Commissioner Frank Prewitt, who by then was under investigation himself, made overtures to his client, that he became involved.

== Criticism ==
Under cross-examination during the criminal trial of former Alaska Representative Tom Anderson, Prewitt testified that he accepted a $30,000 loan from Bill Weimar in 1994, four months before the end of his term as Commissioner of Corrections. He testified it was a personal loan offered during a family emergency that he gratefully accepted and repaid by providing six months of legal consulting work for Allvest, Incorporated from February 1995 to July 1995. He testified that Bill Weimar had a contract to provide halfway house services to Corrections. Neither the prosecution nor defense offered evidence that the loan was accepted in exchange for official acts, special interest favors, or was related in any way to a specific impropriety.

Allvest faced two lawsuits that allege its board of directors defrauded plaintiffs in two 2001 court judgments that held the private corporation responsible for wrongful actions. Attorneys Tim Dooley and Brett von Gemmingen alleged that Allvest owner Weimar sold Allvest assets valued at more than $17 million and distributed most of those funds to himself, with the transfer approved by the Allvest board of directors which was composed of Weimar, Prewitt, and Robert Cronen. "These transfers were made with the intent to evade just obligations," Dooley allege(d) in his lawsuit ... Prewitt also acknowledged making an improper campaign contribution in 2002 that could have resulted in a civil fine or written warning if the violation had come to the attention of the Alaska Public Offices Commission (APOC). The issue had become moot because fines or warnings for Alaska campaign contribution violations could only be issued within twelve months of the alleged violation (Alaska Statutes 15.56.130). The defense used both incidents as an attempt to question Prewitt's motives and truthfulness before the jury. The defense was unsuccessful and on July 9, 2007, Thomas Anderson was convicted on all seven counts of criminal extortion, bribery, and money laundering. On October 15, 2007, Anderson was sentenced to five years in federal prison. Weimar subsequently pleaded guilty to two counts of corruption and was also sentenced to federal prison. After his release, Weimar was also accused of sexual assault of a minor in Florida, having been returned to the U.S. from Cancun, Mexico by the Mexican National Police.

== Personal ==
Prewitt died on September 7, 2020. He was survived by his wife, V Rae, son Jason, daughters Tara Horton and Kelly Preston.
