= Walnut Grove Correctional Facility =

Former prison in Mississippi, United States

Coordinates: 32°34′57″N 89°26′45″W

- Interactive map of Walnut Grove Correctional Facility
- Location: 1650 MS-492 Walnut Grove, Mississippi
- Status: Re-opened in 2021
- Capacity: 1496
- Opened: 2001
- Closed: September 16, 2016
- Managed by: Mississippi Department of Corrections (2021-); Management and Training Corporation July 2012-2016

The Walnut Grove Correctional Facility, formerly the Walnut Grove Youth Correctional Facility (WGYCF), is a state prison in Walnut Grove, Mississippi. It was formerly operated as a for-profit state-owned prison from 1996 to 2016. Constructed beginning in 1990, it was expanded in 2001 and later, holding male youth offenders. It had an eventual capacity of 1,649 prisoners, making it the largest juvenile facility in the country. Contracts for the facility's operations and services were among those investigated by the FBI in its lengthy investigation of state corruption known as Operation Mississippi Hustle.

The prison was one of six for which the state had contracts in the early 21st century with for-profit prison operators; this facility had a record of management problems. A 2010 federal prisoner class-action suit was filed over poor conditions and mistreatment here; it was settled in 2012. Settlement required immediate transfer of youth offenders to a state-run facility meeting juvenile justice standards. The court decree prohibited the state from subjecting any youthful offender to solitary confinement, the first time a federal court had so ruled. In addition, the state changed the mission of WGCF to hold adult prisoners only. The prison had been accredited twice by the American Correctional Association, most recently in 2012.

MDOC terminated its contract with GEO Group, replacing it in 2012 with a 10-year contract with another for-profit operator, Management and Training Corporation (MTC), based in Utah. MTC's contract included operation of two other private prisons previously operated by GEO Group. This facility continued to be overseen by a court monitor; oversight was extended by the court after two riots occurred at the prison in 2014. The state closed the prison in September 2016 and is considering its adaptation for other purposes.

From 2003 to 2010, the prison was operated for the state by Cornell Companies as a facility for youthful offenders. In 2010 Cornell was acquired by the GEO Group. GEO operated the facility, which housed juvenile prisoners convicted of felonies and sentenced as adults. Two-thirds of the prisoners had been convicted of non-violent offenses.

In October 2010, the Department of Justice announced an investigation by the Civil Rights Division into conditions at WGYCF. A separate FBI investigation was started later into the Mississippi prison system related to contracts; extensive corruption was found. As a result of the latter investigation, in November 2014 Christopher Epps resigned as commissioner of the Mississippi Department of Corrections (MDOC), which he had headed since 2002. The next day he and businessman Cecil B. McCrory, a former state legislator, were indicted on 49 federal counts of bribery and receiving kickbacks from for-profit companies operating and serving Mississippi prisons. In 2015, both men pleaded guilty; they assisted the investigation, under which numerous additional indictments and convictions have been achieved. In early 2017, McCrory was sentenced to 8 1/2 years in federal prison. Epps was sentenced in May 2017 to nearly 20 years in prison; he had previously been indicted for receiving $1.47 million in bribes and kickbacks. In February 2017 the Mississippi State Attorney announced a civil suit against MTC, GEO Group and 13 other contractors and several individuals, seeking damages and punitive damages related to contracts made by figures convicted in the corruption case.

As of 2016, the state owes $121 million in bonded indebtedness for the construction and subsequent expansions of the Walnut Grove correctional facility. The MDOC has an "absolute and unconditional" obligation to pay that debt.

== History ==
In the late 20th century, the Mississippi Department of Corrections (MDOC) began to contract with private companies to build and operate prisons in the state to meet rising demand, in part due to changes in sentencing guidelines. The first was opened in 1996. "By 2013, the system had four private prisons and the nation's second-highest incarceration rate." (Note: Tallahatchie County Correctional Facility was also still open in 2013, but it did not hold any Mississippi prisoners. CCA operated the facility under contracts to other states.)

Counties and towns had vied to attract the private prisons, in hopes of stimulating economic development and providing jobs in rural areas.

Cornell Companies expanded the Walnut Grove Youth Correctional Facility (WGYCF), which originally opened in March 2001 under a different operator. It was located in unincorporated Leake County, Mississippi, on land owned by the Walnut Grove Development Authority; this entity was administered by the town of Walnut Grove. The prison was designed as an all-male, youth correctional facility for all levels of custody, with an initial capacity of 321 prisoners.

In the same period, the state also contracted for private management of five other prisons.

In 2001, 321 prisoners were held at the WGYCF; all were 18 years of age or younger. Within several years, the state agreed to a contract to expand the facility and it housed more than 1,000 prisoners by 2009. In total, including the costs of its expansions, the Walnut Grove Correctional facility was the most costly private prison in the state, according to the Jackson Free Press.

Cornell Companies was awarded the state contract to operate the prison in September 2003. It also received contracts to operate East Mississippi Correctional Facility, intended to provide intensive treatment for prisoners who were mentally ill, and Marshall County Correctional Facility.

Although the state increased the number of prisoners held at WGYCF, Cornell Companies did not adjust staffing appropriately. A state audit in 2005 showed the guard to prisoner ratio was 1 to 60, which was believed to contribute to the high rate of violence and abuses reported there. According to the Council for Juvenile Correctional Administrators, a ratio of 1 to 10 or 12 is more common. In addition, prisoners were aging; by 2006 prisoners up to age 21 were housed there to complete sentences. The state assigned older prisoners in their early 20s to WGYCF following expansion of the prison to increase its capacity. These changes made conditions more harsh for the younger inmates.

By 2006, the town of Walnut Grove annexed the prison site, resulting in an apparent, and dramatic, increase in the city's population, from 488 to 1,424. As of 2006 the prison housed 950 prisoners ages 12 to 21. The 200 prison guard jobs helped employ townspeople who had been laid off by closure of a local garment manufacturing plant. Walnut Grove received payment in lieu of taxes from the prison corporation; these monies made up 15% of its annual budget.

In 2009, William Grady Sims, mayor of Walnut Grove since 1981, was appointed by the Mississippi Department of Corrections as director of the independent Walnut Grove Transition Center, despite his lack of any correctional facility experience. This halfway house for up to 150 prisoners, both male and female, was set up in buildings that MDOC leased from Cecil McCrory, a businessman, consultant to numerous prison management and related companies, and former state legislator. The MODC operated the transition center directly with its own staff. Sims also profited from the revenues of the 18 vending machines he had installed at the youth prison.

By 2009, Walnut Grove Correctional Facility had 1,225 prisoners. Cornell Companies operated the prison until August 12, 2010, when Cornell was bought by GEO Group, based in Florida. Mental and medical health services were provided by Health Assurance, and additional contractors provided food services, etc.

In October 2010, United States Department of Justice officials informed Governor of Mississippi Haley Barbour that the department had started a civil rights investigation concerning the prison, in relation to its treatment of prisoners, to assess whether constitutional standards of prisoner safety and humane treatment were being maintained.

In November 2010, plaintiffs represented by the Southern Poverty Law Center and the ACLU National Prison Project filed a federal class-action lawsuit against GEO (which had acquired Cornell and taken over its contracts in Mississippi and elsewhere) and MDOC, saying that the prison authorities allowed abuses and negligence to occur at WGYCF. The lawsuit stated that prison guards engaged in sexual intercourse with the prisoners, tolerated and encouraged violence, smuggled illegal drugs into the facilities, and that prison authorities denied required education and sufficient medical care. As of that month the prison had about 1,200 prisoners ages 13–22; the lawsuit said that half of the prisoners were incarcerated for non-violent offenses. By 2011 prisoners outnumbered Walnut Grove city residents by a 2:1 ratio. Two thirds of the prisoners had been convicted of non-violent offenses.

== DOJ report - March 2012 ==
The Justice Department Civil Rights Division delivered its March 20, 2012, report directly to the governor's office and the court. It said that conditions at WGCF were "among the worst we have seen in any facility anywhere in the nation," characterizing both GEO and the MDOC's lassitude as ignoring the safety of young inmates, allowing a denial of required health care, and hiring guards who were known to have gang affiliations. Press reports indicated the jail was run by gangs whose members included corrupt prison staff. The US Justice Department said that rapes of younger inmates were common.

The DOJ report said that the Walnut Grove Correctional Facility had "systematic, egregious, and dangerous practices exacerbated by a lack of accountability and controls", and stated that sexual misconduct there was "among the worst that we have seen in any facility anywhere in the nation".

== Settlement and aftermath ==
Extensive testimony was heard in court related to the class action suit, including about the state's oversight of the privately run prisons. The state's Deputy Corrections Commissioner, Emmitt Sparkman, had testified in court hearings that the state lacked any authority to force GEO to upgrade security at the persistently short-staffed WGCF. He was questioned about the lines of authority for Mississippi corrections policy. "All we can do is make a request," he said, adding GEO Group was "under no obligation" to provide sufficient staffing, according to the terms of its contract with the state. Judge Reeves found that state officials "repeatedly failed to monitor the contracts with GEO."

Sparkman, who is now retired, had testified in federal court that the MDOC contracts at the time did not define requirements for standards of staffing. Judge Reeves asked him what incentives GEO had to ensure that inmates were properly supervised. Sparkman said, "It's just standard terms of the agreement that they're to provide a safe facility." He continued, "Specific staffing requirements — no, sir, there's not any in the agreement that we have right now."

The US District Court, GEO Group, the state, and civil rights groups settled the federal class-action lawsuit with a court order dated March 26, 2012. In the court ruling, Judge Carlton W. Reeves of the Federal District Court wrote that an assessment of the WGYCF prison conditions "paints a picture of such horror as should be unrealized anywhere in the civilized world,"..."a cesspool of unconstitutional and inhuman acts."

Under the federal court decree, the state agreed to move youthful offenders (17 and under, plus some inmates under 20 who were classified as vulnerable) from the prison to more suitable locations that conformed to juvenile standards. Under federal court order, the state established a state-run youthful offender unit at Central Mississippi Correctional Facility in Rankin County, for prisoners 17 and under, and 18 and 19-year-olds considered vulnerable. The facility is staffed and operated by state personnel. Operations were to be overseen by a federal court monitor.

=== Operations at WGCF ===
On April 20, 2012, the State of Mississippi announced that it would end its contracts with the GEO Group, as required in the terms of the class action settlement. In contrast, GEO announced the change as its decision due to the "financially underperforming" character of the facility. The DOJ report noted that GEO Group had been investigated and strongly criticized during its management of the facility, and it failed to correct problems even after investigation started in relation to the 2010 class action suit. During the period of its contracts, GEO had donated more than $56,000 to Mississippi elected officials. Months after the settlement, reports of violence at the Walnut Grove prison continued.

=== Announcement of contract with MTC ===
Sparkman said that MDOC would be making a new contract with a prison management company in 2012, and that it intended to include specific staffing requirements and financial penalties for failure to maintain these. At the time, Commissioner Chris Epps, MDOC, said that the department believed it would be advantageous for the state to solicit a combined bid for all three prisons for which contracts were being offered. It awarded a 10-year contract to Management and Training Corporation of Utah for all three private facilities. The public was not informed of the financial specifics of the contracts. In 2013 MDOC also awarded a 5-year contract to MTC for operation of Wilkinson County Correctional Facility. The value of the contracts was later revealed to be $60 million annually.

Epps resigned in November 2014 and pleaded guilty in February 2015 to charges related to Operation Mississippi Hustle, a major corruption investigation by the FBI. He is estimated to have been paid $1.47 million in bribes and kickbacks related to contracts which he had steered to certain prison management and other related companies during the previous decade. As part of his plea bargain, he cooperated with law enforcement in a continuing investigation in which several people have pleaded guilty and others have been convicted. Epps is due to be sentenced in May 2017.

MTC was then under contract to the state of Arizona for management of some of its prisons. That state found the company to have been responsible for neglect that enabled the July 2010 Arizona prison escape from the Arizona State Prison – Kingman by three men convicted of violent crimes. Before they were captured, two of them committed a carjacking and two murders while on the run. Months later, the Arizona corrections director said there was little improvement in MTC's operations.

Stakeholders in the Walnut Grove federal class action suit questioned MDOC's decision in 2012 to outsource prison management to another troubled operator, given Mississippi's past problems with oversight in privately run prisons. Managing attorney Jody Owens of the Southern Poverty Law Center (SPLC), who had led youth justice reform efforts in Mississippi, said the state

... has substituted one bad actor for another. The results are almost guaranteed to be the same. Private prisons have an inherent profit motive to not run facilities in a manner that's safe for the people there, and to shortcut staff and medical and mental health services whenever possible.

MTC took over the Walnut Grove facility on July 2, 2012. It took over operations of the state's East Mississippi Correctional Facility and Marshall County Correctional Facility six weeks later. MTC spokesperson Issa Arnita said the firm would be bringing in new management, including wardens and deputy wardens, but expected to retain many of the GEO guards. In addition, MTC gained a contract in 2013 for the Wilkinson County Correctional Facility.

SPLC attorney Owens said Mississippi must take a tougher position on oversight in order to change conditions with a new for-profit operator. "The state takes the position that their hands are tied, that it's under the control of the private prison provider, and that's just not true," Owens said. "You can't just have an agreement with somebody and say, 'OK, well, they're not doing what they're supposed to do.' If somebody doesn't pay their rent, you kick them out."

The Walnut Grove Corrections Facility, used only for adults, remained under court oversight, with a federal monitor providing regular reports on conditions. In May 2013, a series of articles in Mother Jones magazine described the Walnut Grove Correctional Facility as one of the ten worst prisons in the United States. The article did not include any response from the facility or the state. Efforts to improve conditions struggled against violence. In 2014 there were two major riots at Walnut Grove prison. As a result, the federal judge in the class action suit extended court oversight of the facility for an additional period.

The Civil Rights Division of the Department of Justice continued with investigations of overall conditions and practices in the Mississippi state prison system, covering both privately operated and state facilities. These were noted in 2014 for "squalid conditions and violence by guards and inmates."

== 2014 State changes to sentencing ==
To offset the costs of prisons and burgeoning growth in the incarceration rate, in 2014 state legislators passed a law providing a "sweeping plan" for alternatives to prison for some non-violent prisoners, such as monitored house arrest. This has resulted in a decline in the prison population in the state, with a surplus of beds by 2016.

=== Closure ===
In mid-June 2016, the state announced it would close the WGCF for budget reasons, as the demand for prison spaces had declined; this took place on September 16, 2016. The closing of this facility is expected to have adverse economic effects in the town of Walnut Grove, which had been booming because of prison jobs and revenue. Other financial considerations are the state's obligation to pay off the balance of the bonds that were issued to build the Walnut Grove C.F. The full bond debt for Walnut Grove ($153.98 million) has to be retired by 2028.

After the MDOC moved the last 900 prisoners elsewhere, it said that it was considering using the Walnut Grove facility as an alternative to prison, to house parole violators, or adapt it as a reentry facility. The state of Mississippi remains responsible for the remaining balance owed on bonds that had been initially borrowed for the construction in 2001, and adding more debt for its subsequent expansions. As it backed the bonds, the state made its first payment as scheduled on August 1, 2016. The state borrowed $93.6 million for Walnut Grove in 2010. The state refinanced $61.2 million in 2016, and paid off at least $2.6 million of the principal on Aug. 1.

== Operation Mississippi Hustle - federal investigation ==
A related five-year federal investigation, named by the FBI as Operation Mississippi Hustle, has been conducted into allegations of corruption and kickbacks between state officials and private contractors. It started following investigation of sexual abuse of an inmate from the Walnut Grove Transition Center. The FBI investigation has resulted in numerous indictments and convictions by the US Attorney for the Southern District of Mississippi, including of Corrections Commissioner Chris Epps; Cecil McCrory, a consultant and former state legislator; consultant Robert Simmons of Biloxi; and William Grady Sims, the mayor of Walnut Grove and director of the Walnut Grove Transitional Center.

=== Sentencing ===
On September 15, 2016, Biloxi consultant Robert Simmons was sentenced to seven years and three months for his part in the MDOC bribery scandal. Due to his cooperation with law enforcement and a clean prior record, the judge sentenced him to less than the nine years required by federal sentencing guidelines. Simmons had been paid a $10,000 monthly fee by AJA Management & Technical Services Inc. of Jackson, Mississippi, for 18 months as it managed expansions of the Walnut Grove and East Mississippi state prisons. Simmons kicked back a portion of that monthly fee to Chris Epps, then Commissioner of the Department of Corrections. Simmons admitted bribing Epps from 2005 to 2014.

William Sims pleaded guilty to interfering with a witness and received a seven-month prison sentence, plus six months' home confinement.

Due to the unfolding case, the sentencing of Chris Epps, who pleaded guilty and cooperated with the investigators, was delayed to May 24–25, 2017. He was charged with receiving an estimated $1.47 million in bribes and kickbacks related to his steering of state contracts worth $800 million to certain businesses. Judge Wingate rejected McCrory's request to withdraw his plea; on February 2, 2017, he sentenced McCrory to 8 1/2 years. The judge said his sentence and others may be reduced after other defendants were sentenced.

== State civil suit- 2017 ==
On February 8, 2017, Mississippi Attorney General Jim Hood announced that he was filing civil suits against numerous contractors and individuals for damages and punitive damages, related to the contracts made by MDOC under Epps, as revealed in the federal investigation and convictions. The defendants included former Walnut Grove operators Cornell Companies, Inc., the GEO Group, Inc. and Management & Training Corporation, as well as providers of mental and physical health services, telephone, food and commissary services, and construction contractor AJA Management & Technical Services, Inc. as among companies from which he intended to seek recovery of the cost of state contracts, as required by state law.

The state of Mississippi has been defrauded through a pattern of bribery, kickbacks, misrepresentations, fraud, concealment, money laundering and other wrongful conduct." He continued, "These individuals and corporations that benefited by stealing from taxpayers must not only pay the state's losses, but state law requires that they must also forfeit and return the entire amount of the contracts paid by the state. We are also seeking punitive damages to punish these conspirators and to deter those who might consider giving or receiving kickbacks in the future.

On May 18, 2017, Hood announced that the state had settled the first suit for two million dollars. Ten lawsuits in bribery schemes are pending. Those have accused at least 10 individuals and 11 out-of-state corporations of using so-called "consultants" to fix more than $800 million in Mississippi prison contracts.

== Reopening ==
In November 2021 it reopened as a state facility.

== See also ==
- Prison–industrial complex
