= Murder of Ashley Smylie =

March 2024 event in Brandon, Mississippi

Murder of Ashley Smylie and attempted murder of Heath Smylie
- Ashley Smylie
- Location: Brandon, Mississippi, United States
- Date: March 19, 2024; 2 years ago
- Attack type: Murder by gunshot wound from .357 Magnum, attempted murder
- Deaths: Ashley Smylie
- Injuries: Heath Smylie
- Perpetrator: Carly Madison Gregg
- Verdict: Guilty on all counts
- Convictions: First-degree murder, attempted murder, tampering with evidence
- Sentence: 2 life sentences without the possibility of parole plus 10 years

On March 19, 2024, Ashley Smylie was murdered at her home in Brandon, Mississippi, United States, by her 14-year-old daughter, Carly Madison Gregg, with 3 gunshots to the head. An hour later, Gregg shot her stepfather Heath Smylie in the shoulder. In September of that year, Gregg was found guilty of first-degree murder, attempted murder, and tampering with evidence. After being tried as an adult in a five-day trial with a Rankin County, Mississippi, jury, Gregg was sentenced to two life sentences without the possibility of parole for the murder of Ashley Smylie, the attempted murder of Heath Smylie and 10 years for tampering with evidence. An appeal for a new trial was denied by the Mississippi Supreme Court in 2026.

== Background ==
Ashley Nicole Smylie (April 11, 1983 – March 19, 2024) was a 40-year-old mathematics teacher at Northwest Rankin High School. She had two daughters, Natalee Renee Gregg, who is deceased, and Carly Madison Gregg, who was born on April 23, 2009. Gregg attended the high school where her mother, Smylie, worked. Heath Smylie, husband to Ashley Smylie and stepfather of Carly Gregg, worked as a physical therapist five minutes from their home.

During the mid-afternoon of March 19, 2024, Ashley Smylie was informed by a student of the high school and friend of Gregg's that Gregg had a large amount of cannabis concealed in her bedroom. Along with cannabis, e-cigarettes and burner phones were also discovered. It was upon seeing this that Gregg's friend decided to inform Smylie. Gregg was said to be on medication during this time, which apparently contributed to symptoms of dissociation, auditory hallucinations and mood swings. Attempts had been made to ease Gregg's symptoms through equine-assisted therapy. Gregg had previously brought a Swiss army knife to school, causing her to be transferred. Her history of drugs, according to Heath Smylie, may have been influenced by her biological father Kevin Gregg's drug use. Previous tension between Gregg and Ashley Smylie involved confiscation of her cell phone as punishment.

== Murder of Ashley Smylie ==
During the morning of March 19, Ashley Smylie went to work at the school with her daughter, Carly Gregg, who was a ninth-grade student there. Heath Smylie then left for work. During the school day, Gregg was described as being grumpy, irritable, unable to focus in the classroom and having a "memory blank". At 3:54pm, Ashley Smylie and Gregg returned home, text messages sent by Ashley to Heath mentioned plans to go grocery shopping. Subsequent events involving Gregg were captured on CCTV cameras in the garage and dining areas.

At about 4:00 p.m., Gregg entered her parents' bedroom and retrieved a .357 Magnum gun, which was owned by Ashley, from underneath their mattress. She concealed the gun from the cameras by hiding the firearm behind her back. Following this, Gregg confronted her mother, and the sound of three gunshots, coupled with screaming, could be heard on the CCTV footage. The shots impacted Ashley's skull, but they were not immediately fatal. Gregg then returned to the kitchen with the gun still concealed behind her back. During the following minutes, Ashley died as a result of the injuries sustained from the gunshots. In the kitchen, Gregg used Ashley's cell phone to contact her stepfather, pretending to be her mother, with a text message reading "Are you almost home, honey?" (Note: Or a variation of this message. Different news sources provide different versions of the message sent by Gregg to her stepfather.) During the interim period between the message being sent to Heath Smylie and his arrival at the home, Gregg sent another message to a friend in an effort to invite them to the house, with the friend arriving not long after.

== Attempted murder of Heath Smylie ==
Gregg's stepfather, Heath Smylie, arrived home at 5:03pm, 49 minutes after receiving the message from Ashley's phone. Upon opening the front doors to the house, Heath was ambushed by Gregg, with several bullets being fired from the .357 Magnum. One of these bullets impacted Heath's trapezius, less than six inches from his face, injuring the shoulder. Heath then disarmed Gregg whilst the remaining bullets were fired. Heath described Gregg as screaming, believed she was terrified, and that he may not have been her intended target. Immediately following the removal of the firearm from her possession, Gregg escaped through the back door of the house. The CCTV camera, which was recording in the garage, filmed Gregg running towards the street with an unidentified person in accompaniment. This person was later identified as the friend Gregg invited to the house.

== Gregg's arrest and immediate aftermath ==
Heath searched the home and found his wife dead, with fatal injuries to her head. The police were immediately contacted, and officers were sent to the Smylies' home. A short time later, Gregg was located near the home and arrested without incident. Investigators began to search the home for evidence. Heath was reportedly unaware that the friend had been present at the house. He retrieved the CCTV cameras from the garage on March 20–21, offering them to the police as evidence; however, he was warned that he could be charged with tampering with evidence. After this, Heath hired a lawyer and ceased contact with the investigators. Heath's license was temporarily confiscated.

Another CCTV camera that had been recording on the day of the murder was discovered to be missing during the investigation. It was later located inside their refrigerator. The investigators were contacted again, and Heath consented to review the available footage from the camera. The status of the evidence on this camera was unknown due to the low temperature in the refrigerator, which could have affected the camera's memory.

== Trial ==
=== Proceedings ===
Mugshot of Carly Gregg

State of Mississippi Vs. Carly Madison Gregg began on September 16, 2024, with opening statements and a recording of Heath Smylie on the telephone to police dispatch. A Rankin County jury was in attendance.

On day two of the trial, Heath Smylie told the court his version of the events of March 19, 2024. The courtroom was reportedly busy due to the publicity of the case. Gregg's attorney had previously filed for the trial to exclude the public and the media, stating that Gregg would not get a fair chance in the trial. Judge Dewey Arthur responded by saying he would make sure that the trial was open, public and fair. This was based on a specific Mississippi precedent that supported the media in court with the Mississippi Supreme Court ruling in favor of this in 2005, after a circuit court attempted to stop television coverage of a conspicuous case.

Defense witnesses were heard by the jury on day three of the trial—these consisted of Heath Smylie, a minor, Rankin County Sheriff's Office Deputy Tony Shack, and psychiatrist Dr. Andrew Clark.

State experts gave rebuttals the following day, including psychiatric nurse practitioner Olivia Leber, mental health counselor Rebecca Kirk, and forensic psychiatry specialists Dr. Jason Pickett and Dr. Amanda Gugliano. The rebuttals provided by the state experts conflicted with the testimony given by Dr. Andrew Clark on the previous day.

==== Insanity plea ====
The long-established M'Naghten rules were used in conjunction with Mississippi's legal standards for testing insanity to determine whether Carly Gregg met the criteria for such a defense. Gregg's psychiatrist, Dr. Andrew Clark, was cross-examined by defense attorney Michael Smith. Despite Clark making the court aware of Gregg's depression and auditory hallucinations, he concurred that Gregg had knowingly attempted to cover-up the murder when asked by Smith. Dr. Jason Pickett and Dr. Amanda Gugliano performed a mental status examination on Gregg using the M'Naghten rules, with insanity being evaluated by two specific criteria. The first criterion concerns whether the individual has previously been diagnosed with a mental disorder. The second criterion is dependent on whether the individual understood "the nature and the quality" of the actions they took whilst committing the offense. Clark testified that Gregg had undergone a mental health crisis during the events of March 19, which he believed was caused by a newly prescribed medication. It was noted by Olivia Leber that Gregg had been diagnosed with clinical depression and adjustment disorder and that she denied experiencing auditory hallucinations; however, it was unknown whether they were chronic, and symptoms of these conditions were not observed during a second appointment. Counselor Rebecca Kirk confirmed that Gregg had disruptive thoughts, anger issues, and difficulty sleeping.

Dr. Jason Pickett reviewed evidence provided by investigators, which included text messages sent by Gregg to her friend in the period leading up to March 19, specific journal entries that Pickett described as "theatrical" and "concerning", conversations between Gregg and her family, and the use of prescribed medication. A dosage of the medication escitalopram taken by Gregg was determined as not being a cause of the crimes that were committed. An appointment with Leber on March 12 resulted in Gregg no longer taking the medication sertraline due to unwanted side effects. Despite informing Kirk and Leber that she did not experience auditory hallucinations, Gregg did explain to Dr. Amanda Gugliano that she heard voices as a young child.

After the evidence was reviewed and the mental evaluations were completed, Dr. Jason Pickett concluded that he believed Gregg did not meet Mississippi's legal definition of insanity on March 19 and that the nature, quality, and wrongfulness of her actions were known. The prescribed dosage of escitalopram was also considered by Pickett as not being a cause of Gregg's actions. In reaction to the conclusion, Gregg's father Kevin Gregg told People Magazine that Carly "knew right from wrong" and that she was not insane. He also criticised not being contacted by anybody involved and called the defence "poor". He went on to say that the only thing that would help Gregg is the truth, rehabilitation and remorse, expressing that he hopes she "finds Jesus" and "reconciles with what she did".

==== Verdict ====
On September 20, 2024, after a two-hour deliberation, the Rankin County jury found Carly Gregg guilty of the murder of Ashley Smylie, attempted murder of Heath Smylie, and tampering with evidence. After a further hour of jury deliberation, Gregg was sentenced to life in prison for murder and attempted murder, with a concurrent ten-year sentence for tampering with evidence. Judge Arthur delivered these sentences. Gregg had been offered a plea deal whereby she would serve only one 40-year sentence for the murder of her mother, whilst the two remaining charges would be dropped. This deal was declined by Gregg despite Judge Arthur's efforts to ensure the consequences of this decision were understood.

=== Imprisonment ===
As of September 24, 2024, Gregg is imprisoned in the Youthful Offender Unit of the Central Mississippi Correctional Facility, located in Rankin County, Mississippi.

== Appeal for new trial ==
Gregg's new legal counsel labelled the trial as unjust. Immediately following this, her defense team, consisting of attorneys Bridgett Todd and Kevin Camp, filed an appeal on September 26, 2024. Kathryn W. Newman, Assistant District Attorney with the State of Mississippi, responded to the appeal on October 7, 2024. After this, Gregg received new legal counsel. It was unknown when the Mississippi Supreme Court would hear the case, with estimates that it could take another 18 months to finalize a decision. Gregg's newly appointed attorney, James Murphy, stated that his research will involve leveraging any "mistakes" made during the phases of both the investigation and the trial in order to secure a new trial. Murphy also explained they would "research this case to death". On July 30, 2025, Murphy requested a 30-day extension for preparation of the appeal brief, his reasoning relating to misconduct from Gregg's previous attorney, Bridgett Todd. This extension was approved the following day, setting a new deadline of August 19, 2025.

In early April 2026, the Mississippi Supreme Court issued a statement announcing that it grants the presentation, on May 27, 2026, of oral arguments by Gregg's defense in support of her appeal. Arguments for Gregg receiving the possibility of parole were presented in a hearing, stipulating that as of July 1, 2024, juvenile life imprisonment without the possibility of parole was illegal. Justice Josiah D. Coleman questioned the argument, reminding that the sentence was "life imprisonment" and not "life without the possibility of parole". Other issues raised included the quantity of evidence shown by Gregg at the trial. This was dismissed by prosecutor Allison Hartman due to Gregg's agreement to the instructions given at the time. On August 20, 2026, the Mississippi Supreme Court upheld Gregg’s conviction and sentence.

=== Carly's Warriors group ===
A group called "Carly's Warriors", set up and run by Greggs's maternal grandparents, as well as by other members of her mother's family, was registered with the Mississippi Secretary of State’s Office in February 2026, and is run with Heath Smylie. The group claims that Gregg's sentence was "disproportionate" to the crime and unfair, given Gregg's age and the influence of her change in medication.
