= Delta Correctional Facility =

Prison in Mississippi, United States

Coordinates: 33°28′50″N 90°12′36″W

- Interactive map of Delta Correctional Facility
- Location: 3800 County Road 540 Greenwood, Mississippi
- Status: open
- Capacity: 1,172
- Opened: 1996
- Closed: January 15, 2012
- Managed by: Mississippi Department of Corrections

Delta Correctional Facility is a Mississippi Department of Corrections state prison for women, opened in the late 20th century and re-opened in the early 21st century in the state, and operated by for-profit corporations. Located in Greenwood, Leflore County, Mississippi, in the largely rural Mississippi Delta region, it was initially operated by Corrections Corporation of America, which changed its name to CoreCivic in 2014.

The facility first opened in 1996, with a capacity of 1,016 beds. This facility was closed by the state in 2002 due to excess capacity in Mississippi’s corrections system, then re-opened in 2004.

The facility was closed again on January 15, 2012. In 2022, the prison reopened as Delta Correctional Facility for women. Prior to closing, the facility also housed about 125 county prisoners from Leflore County, Mississippi. As a result of the closing, the Mississippi DOC claimed $118 million in cost savings and cost avoidance.

The prison reopened after the state bought it out.

== Management incidents ==
In 2009, Joseph Jackson, serving a life sentence at Delta Correctional Facility, escaped custody while on a supervised visit to an eye doctor. Jackson's cousin, Cortney Logan of Louisville, Kentucky, used a firearm to free Jackson, and the pair fled in a rental car. When stopped approximately 300 mi (480 km) northeast in Nashville, Tennessee by police Sergeant Mark Chesnut, Jackson shot the officer in the abdomen, five times. Chestnut survived and later sued Corrections Corporation of America. The suit was settled for an undisclosed amount. Logan was later found guilty as an accomplice in the shooting of Chesnut.

Convicted felon Cedric Gordon was mistakenly released from Delta in mid-August 2009; his mother returned him to prison. A gang fight among inmates on July 7, 2011 left six inmates injured and 26-year-old inmate Derek Criddle fatally stabbed.

The warden at the time of closing was Raymond Byrd, who then became warden at Wilkinson County Correctional Center, also in Mississippi, until the contract was lost to Management and Training Corporation, in July 2013.
