= Tallahatchie County Correctional Facility =

Prison in Mississippi, United States

Coordinates: 34°01′33″N 90°26′41″W

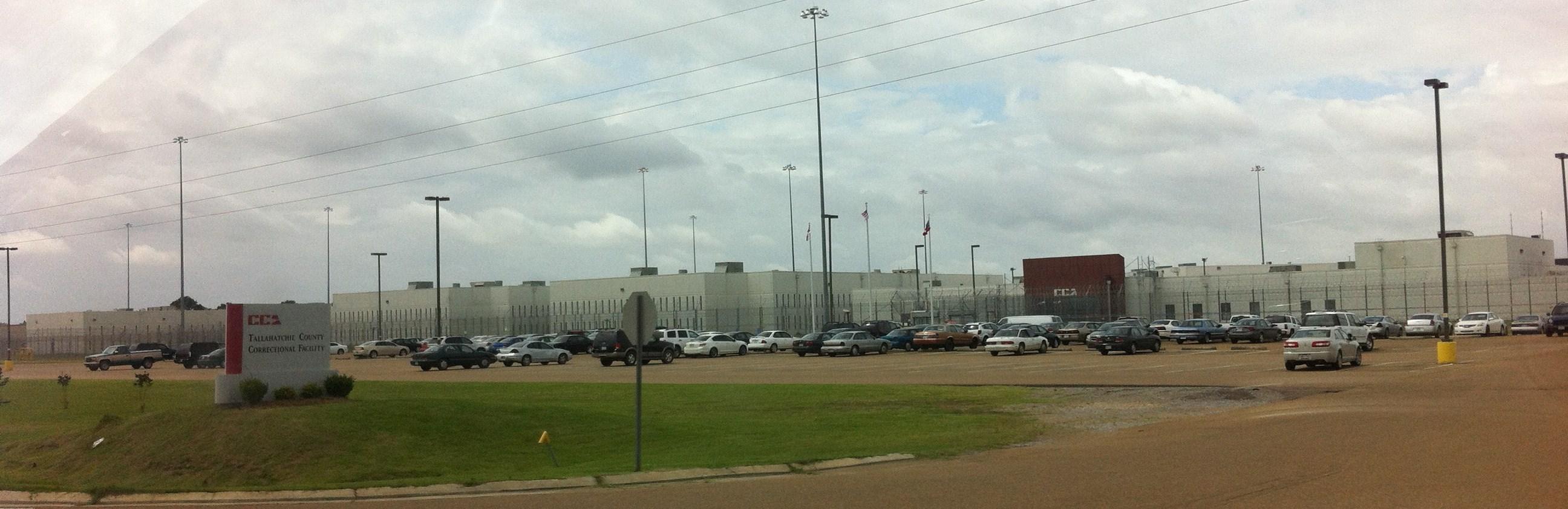
- Interactive map of Tallahatchie County Correctional Facility
- Location: Tallahatchie County, Mississippi, U.S.
- Status: open
- Security class: Maximum Security
- Capacity: 2542
- Opened: 2000
- Managed by: CoreCivic

Tallahatchie County Correctional Facility (TCCF) is a private prison for men, authorized by the Tallahatchie County Correctional Authority and operated by CoreCivic, formerly the Corrections Corporation of America on behalf of the Mississippi Department of Corrections. The maximum-security facility is located in unincorporated Tallahatchie County, Mississippi, near Tutwiler in the Mississippi Delta. Since its opening with 352 prisoners, the prison has expanded capacity nearly ninefold, holding 2672 inmates by October 2008. It has housed inmates from Wisconsin, Colorado, Hawaii, Wyoming, Vermont, and California, in addition to prisoners from Alabama, Louisiana and Mississippi. In 2010 the facility served as a county jail and also housed more than 1,000 prisoners from California. Since 2013, it has not held Mississippi state prisoners.

The prison opened in March 2000 with 352 prisoners. It is one of six private prisons constructed to hold state prisoners. As of early 2017, three are still operating for the state. (One of these was closed in September 2016.) The facility is located on a 149-acre (60 ha) plot of land located along U.S. Highway 49, 1.5 miles (2.4 km) north of Tutwiler, 12 miles (19 km) south of Clarksdale, and 85 miles (137 km) from Memphis International Airport. 27 acres (11 ha) of the prison property are fenced and used as the prison. By 2008 the prison held 2,672 prisoners, and competing California gang members erupted in a violent riot. Additional such incidents have occurred. Legally the prison's capacity is 2,800 prisoners. In September 2005 the facility was accredited by the American Correctional Association.

As of 2016 the county has no hotel facilities, so families visiting inmates must stay in hotels in other counties.

State contracts with MTC and the previous operator, Corrections Corporation of America (CCA), have been under investigation since before 2014 in what is known as Operation Mississippi Hustle, a wide-ranging statewide corruption case investigated by the FBI. Former Commissioner Chris Epps was indicted in November 2014 (the day after he resigned), as was Cecil McCrory, a consultant, contractor and former state legislator. Both pleaded guilty in February 2015, cooperated with investigators and are now serving prison time. Numerous other figures have been indicted; some have pleaded guilty, others have been convicted at trial, and one committed suicide. In February 2017, the Mississippi State Attorney announced a civil suit against the private prison operators and numerous other contractors, for damages and punitive damages, to recover the cost of contracts.

== History ==
Longstanding poverty in this rural community meant that many residents had to rely on charity from Christian organizations. Around 1998 the leaders of the Town of Tutwiler decided to permit construction of a private prison in their jurisdiction, hoping it would provide jobs to area residents. Originally, the prison was planned to house Mississippi state prisoners as well as others from other states. To help facilitate construction of the prison, the Town of Tutwiler constructed a sewage lagoon and a water tower for infrastructure.

The State of Mississippi and Tallahatchie County paid half of the cost to train correctional officers for the new prison, in order to support improving the local economy. Carrothers Construction built the Tallahatchie County Correctional Facility for $35 million.

The Mississippi Department of Corrections contracted with Corrections Corporation of America (CCA) to provide prison management services. CCA also had a contract for the Wilkinson County Correctional Facility, which it held until 2013. James T. Kilborn of The New York Times said that when the Tallahatchie facility opened in 2000 with 351 prisoners, including 322 from Wisconsin, it "seemed the salvation of" Tutwiler. Some area residents quit their jobs and began working as Correctional Officers at the facility. After the prison's opening, its monthly payroll was $467,000.

In March and April 2001, Wisconsin moved its prisoners out of the prison, leaving only about 20 to 125 prisoners per period. Before the move the prison had 208 employees. The prison's employees were reduced to 40 people, with numerous layoffs. Before the reduction, in 2001 the prison had paid $600,000 annually to the county in property taxes and $5,350 per month to the town for water. By late-2001 the total monthly payroll decreased to $80,000. Kilborn said that by November 2001, the prison "left the town little better off than it ever was."

In June 2003 the prison received 1,423 inmates from Alabama, and the prison hired 250 employees during that year to care for them. In May 2004 36 prisoners were moved from the Guadalupe County Adult Detention Center in Seguin, Texas to TCCF; they had been identified as gang leaders. Twenty-four were shipped on one day, with the remaining 12 on another day.

In July 2004 inmates from Colorado started a riot at the prison. No injuries resulted. A CCA official said that the Colorado inmates may have been trying to gain return to their home state. They were very isolated from any family and friends.

By October 2004, TCCF had a capacity of 1,104 prisoners. During that month the Mississippi Department of Corrections signed a contract to house 128 maximum-security prisoners at TCCF. In 2005 prisoners from Hawaii being housed here caused a disturbance.

In 2008 the State of California announced it was transferring an additional 1,300 prisoners to Tallahatchie County. In May 2008 a riot broke out: gang members from the Sureños, aka 'Southerners' from the Los Angeles area, and Norteños, aka 'Northerners' from the 'Valley' of Northern California, were fighting one another in the recreation yard. Assistant Warden Richard Bice reached the yard first among officers. Seeing more than 100 inmates fighting violently, he placed the facility on lockdown and radioed for assistance. With several officers armed with chemical agents and batons, he went out into the yard to subdue the prisoners. Some were lying injured on the ground. Bice along with several staff members used force to quell the riot. Several inmates were treated on site for stab wounds, while some were transported to area hospitals. That was the first of many violent incidents caused by the California inmates.

Richard Bice had been named as Assistant Warden in February 2008. His previous assignments were as Chief of Security at North Fork Correctional Facility in Sayre, Oklahoma; Chief of Security at Camino Nuevo Correctional Facility in Albuquerque, New Mexico; Lieutenant/S.O.R.T Commander at Dawson State Jail in Dallas, Texas; Corrections Major/Tactical Commander with the Illinois Department of Corrections; and a Tactical Assistant Commander with the Indiana Department of Corrections. He is retired from the United States Army after a 22-year career.

On October 24, 2008, the prison's 128-bed expansion was completed, increasing the prison's capacity to 2,672 prisoners. The extra beds were contracted to California. By 2013, the state no longer held any prisoners at this facility, because of decreasing prison population. CCA has a contract with California to hold prisoners here.

In 2016 Eli Hager and Rui Kaneya of The Marshall Project wrote that, according to Tallahatchie County area officials, CCA had never invested much money in the county. Since the prison's opening, the company's investments locally had declined. They said that "CCA has not spent as much of its revenue on the Mississippi Delta economy as local leaders had hoped."

== MDOC and contractor corruption case ==
Chris Epps resigned as Commissioner of the Mississippi Department of Corrections (MDOC) in early November 2014. The next day he was indicted by the US Attorney of the Southern District of Mississippi, together with consultant and former state legislator Cecil McCrory, on 49 counts in a corruption scheme related to contracts that Epps steered to particular companies. In February 2015 both men pleaded guilty in plea bargains and cooperated with FBI investigators in a far-reaching case known as Operation Mississippi Hustle. Epps is estimated to have been paid $1.47 million in bribes and kickbacks in the previous decade, based on $800 million in contracts. Additional indictments, guilty pleas and convictions have taken place. The unfolding nature of the case and trials of other figures delayed sentencing for Epps, now scheduled for late May 2017. McCrory was sentenced to 8 1/2 years in prison in February 2017.

In February 2017, Mississippi Attorney General Jim Hood announced he had filed civil cases against 15 corporations and numerous individuals who had engaged in contracts with the MDOC and Epps, seeking damages and punitive damages. Among the companies named were MTC, GEO Group, and CCA.
