= South Mississippi Correctional Institution =

Prison in Mississippi, United States

Coordinates: 31°10′35″N 88°36′25″W

- Interactive map of South Mississippi Correctional Institution
- Location: 22689 Mississippi 63 Leakesville, Mississippi
- Status: open
- Security class: mixed
- Capacity: 3204
- Opened: 1989
- Managed by: Mississippi Department of Corrections

South Mississippi Correctional Institution (SMCI) is a Mississippi Department of Corrections prison for men located in Leakesville, Mississippi. The facility has 360 acres (150 ha) of land.

== History ==
Dedication ceremonies were scheduled for April 1989, and the moving in of the first 25 inmates was scheduled to occur on April 17, 1989. The prison opened on April 13, 1990, with an initial capacity of 516 prisoners. It was designed by Dale and Associates. In 2001 the groundbreaking for a new chapel occurred.

Jerry Mitchell of the Mississippi Center for Investigative Reporting stated that upon SCMI's opening, it "provided employment for a job-starved small town."

In 2018, a judge approved an agreement for Leakesville to annex multiple areas, including SMCI.

== Demographics ==
As of September 1, 2008, South Mississippi Correctional Institution, with a capacity of 3,204, had 3,106 prisoners, making up a total of 21.57% of people within the Mississippi Department of Corrections-operated prisons, county jails, and community work centers. Of the inmates at SMCI, all of whom are male, in 2008 2,088 were Black, 962 were White, 45 were Hispanic, nine were Asian, and two were Native American.

== Operations ==
In the late 2010s SMCI faced a combination of severe budget cuts, low levels of enforcement officer staffing, and conditions dangerous to staff and prisoners. State senator and Leaksville native Dennis DeBar drew a direct connection between the prison's staff vacancy rate of just under 50% -- half of its necessary jobs filled—and the offered starting salary of $25,000 per year. An investigation by the state Attorney General's office into the escape of a felon inmate named Michael Wilson in July 2018 found that SMCI was hampered from communicating or coordinating with other agencies, posing risk to public safety. The prison had no apparent command structure, did not use expected radio frequencies, was not aware of the inmate's absence for two hours while he interacted with Leaksville citizens, and did not share information about the inmate's prior escape and prior destination. That might have caused his re-capture sooner, because Wilson traveled the same way.

Some MDOC farming operations occur at SMCI.

== Notable Inmates ==
Luke Woodham - Perpetrator of 1997 Pearl High School shooting.
