= Central Mississippi Correctional Facility =

Prison in Rankin County, Mississippi, US

Coordinates: 32°13′41″N 90°03′31″W

- Interactive map of Central Mississippi Correctional Facility
- Location: 3794 MS-468 unincorporated Rankin County, Mississippi Pearl address
- Status: Open
- Security class: Mixed
- Capacity: 3,557
- Opened: 1986
- Managed by: Mississippi Department of Corrections

The Central Mississippi Correctional Facility (CMCF) is a Mississippi Department of Corrections (MDOC) prison for men and women located in an unincorporated area in Rankin County, Mississippi, United States, between the cities of Pearl and Brandon. The 171-acre (69 ha) prison was, for a period of time, the only state prison to hold female prisoners in Mississippi, in addition to minimum and medium security male offenders. It operates as the female death row of the state.

The prison is in proximity to the state capital of Jackson.

The prison houses the Receiving and Classification Unit (R&C), where most prisoners entering the MDOC system are held before going to their permanent unit assignments. Most male inmates who are sentenced to MDOC by the courts or who are returned to MDOC as parole violators, probation violators, intensive supervision program (ISP) violators, earned release supervision (ERS) violators, and suspension violators are placed at R&C. All women inmates who are sentenced to MDOC by the courts or who are returned to MDOC as parole violators, probation violators, ISP violators, ERS violators, and suspension violators are placed in 1A or 2B at CMCF. Male death row inmates do not go to CMCF; they are transferred from county jails and immediately go to the Mississippi State Penitentiary, the location of the male death row.

MDOC states that CMCF was "designed to provide aesthetics along with security."

On February 19, 2024, The Washington Post reported that a former inmate, Susie Balfour, had filed a lawsuit alleging that she had developed breast cancer as a consequence of working with carcinogens without proper protective equipment, and that the facility had refused to provide her with proper treatment for her cancer. When she was released she sought treatment and discovered her cancer was Stage 4, and was terminal.

== History ==
CMCF opened in January 1986 with a capacity of 667 prisoners. CMCF was the first prison facility of the Mississippi Department of Corrections outside of the Mississippi State Penitentiary (MSP) in Sunflower County. Upon the opening of CMCF, female prisoners were transferred from MSP to CMCF; previously women were held in MSP Camp 25. CMCF was designed by Dale and Associates. It was originally named the Rankin County Correctional Facility (RCCF). Johnson & Johnson uses prison labor from this facility to operate a "clean room" for the cleaning and sterilizing of suture spools.

In 2021, a campus of the New Orleans Baptist Theological Seminary was established in the penitentiary.

== Demographics ==
As of September 1, 2008, Central Mississippi Correctional Facility, with a capacity of 3,665, had 3,610 prisoners, making up a total of 25.07% of people within the Mississippi Department of Corrections-operated prisons, county jails, and community work centers. Of the male inmates at CMCF, 1,383 are Black, 738 are White, 16 are Hispanic, three are Native American, two are Asian, and one has no available data. Of the female prisoners, 781 are Black, 672 are White, 8 are Hispanic, 3 are Asian, 2 are Native American, and one has no available data.

== Notable inmates ==
Inmates incarcerated at CMCF:

- Carla Hughes - Former middle schoolteacher convicted of two counts of capital murder for the murders of her lover's pregnant fiancee Avis Banks and her unborn child.
- Luke Woodham - perpetrator of the 1997 Pearl High School shooting, since moved to the Mississippi State Penitentiary.
- Carly Madison Gregg, a juvenile convicted of the 2024 murder of Ashley Smylie, her mother

Inmates on Death Row:

- Lisa Jo Chamberlin - convicted alongside Roger Lee Gillett in the murders of Vernon Hulett and Linda Heintzelman.

== See also ==
- Capital punishment in Mississippi
