= East Mississippi Correctional Facility =

Prison in Mississippi, United States

Coordinates: 32°20′18″N 88°47′55″W

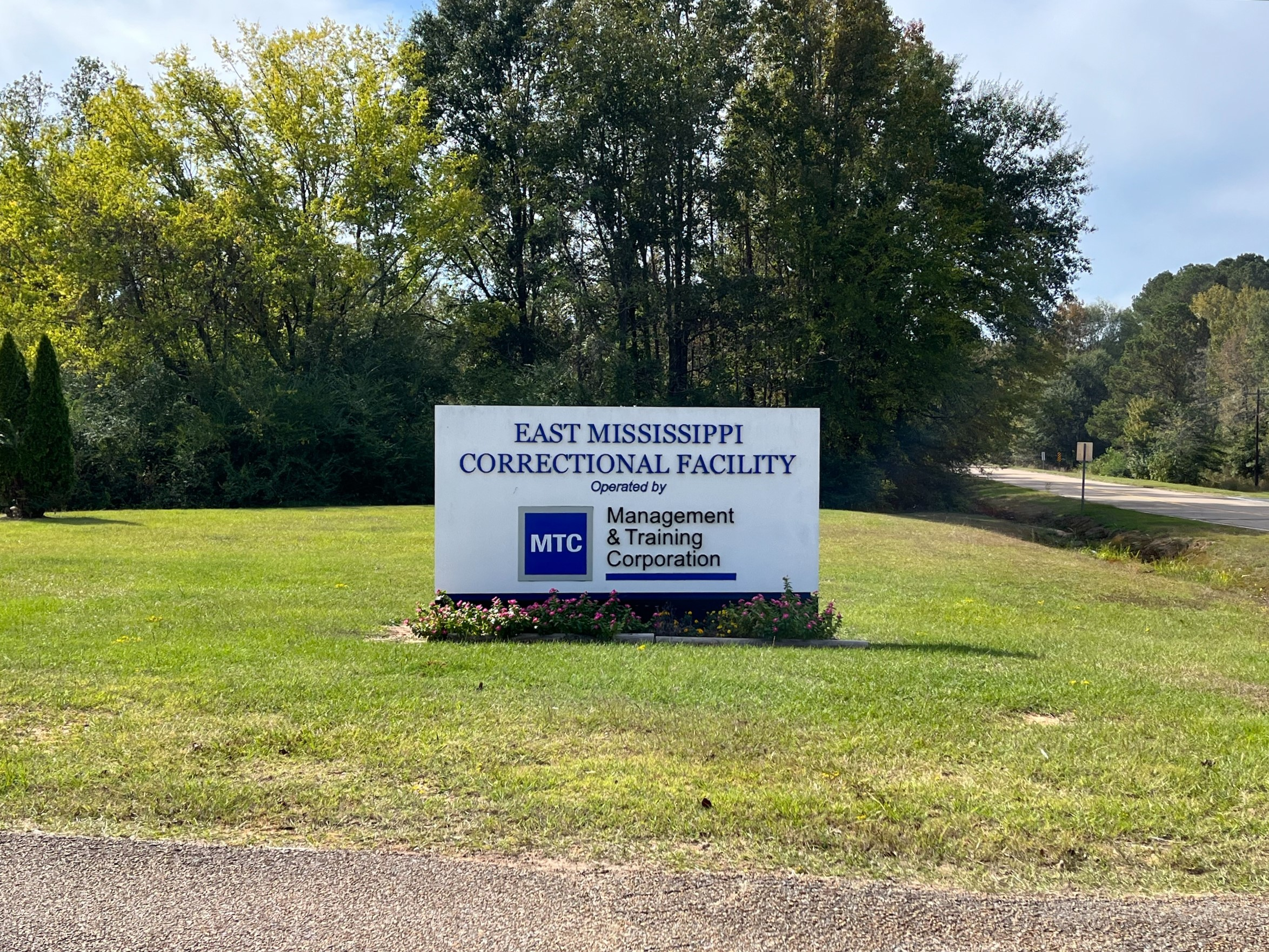
- Interactive map of East Mississippi Correctional Facility
- Location: 10641 Old Hwy 80 W Meridian, Mississippi
- Status: open
- Security class: mixed
- Capacity: 1500
- Opened: 1999
- Managed by: Management and Training Corporation

East Mississippi Correctional Facility is a men's prison located in unincorporated Lauderdale County, Mississippi, near Meridian. It is about 90 miles east of the capital, Jackson. Opened in 1999, the special needs prison is intended to provide a high level of care for up to 1500 prisoners with serious mental illness, at all custody levels.

Since the prison opened, it has been one of six prisons in the state operated under contract to the Mississippi Department of Corrections (MDOC) by three successive for-profit companies. EMCF was first operated by Cornell Companies, which was acquired by the GEO Group in 2010. In 2012, MDOC forced GEO out of its Mississippi contracts for three facilities, after failure to improve substandard medical treatment and squalor in its facilities, and as a part of its settlement that year of a federal lawsuit for its operation of the Walnut Grove Youth Correctional Facility. MDOC awarded the contract at EMCF and Walnut Grove to Management and Training Corporation (MTC) of Utah, but the complaints continued.

In May 2013, the ACLU and Southern Poverty Law Center filed a class action suit against the state of Mississippi and operators of EMCF on behalf of its prisoners because of the abuses and the failure to improve conditions. In addition, the United States Department of Justice (DOJ) continued a separate investigation of the prison system related to PREA audits, and another section investigated corruption among officials and contractors for the Mississippi prison system.

In November 2014, Mississippi Corrections Commissioner Christopher Epps resigned a day before he was indicted by the US Department of Justice (DOJ) on corruption charges for bribery and taking kickbacks. Commissioner since 2002, he was known for reducing the use of solitary confinement in state prisons, and reducing prison populations after supporting passage of a 2009 bill allowing earlier parole for non-violent offenders with a low risk of recidivism. Cecil McCrory, a business man and former state legislator, was indicted for bribing Epps in return for having prison-services contracts steered to him and his clients. He had worked as a consultant for MTC, GEO Group, and Cornell Companies, all of which had operated private prisons in Mississippi. By November 2015 both men had pleaded guilty and were cooperating with law enforcement in the investigation. A third man also pleaded guilty. The trial of another former state lawmaker, Irb Benjamin, was scheduled for January 2016. Numerous other people were convicted in this case and prosecutions were continuing in 2017. In February 2017 the Mississippi Attorney General announced civil suits seeking damages and punitive damages from 15 contractors and several individuals who had contracts during this period awarded under Epps and associated with prison operations. As of early 2017, the state has contracts for only three privately run prisons.

== History ==
The East Mississippi Correctional Facility Authority authorized the facility. East Mississippi is the state's main "special needs" facility, housing up to 1500 prisoners with serious mental health issues.

Located on 160 acres, the prison opened in April 1999; it was intended to provide intensive treatment of prisoners with severe mental illness. It has been operated since the beginning by for-profit prison management companies: Cornell Companies was the first; it was acquired by GEO Group in 2010, which took over its contracts with the state and county authorities. Prison advocacy groups have tracked conditions here.

In 2010 MDOC and the American Civil Liberties Union agreed to a deal to transfer mentally ill prisoners from Unit 32 of the Mississippi State Penitentiary at Parchman to EMCF in an effort to improve conditions for them, as well as for other prisoners who remained in the unit. In an effort to improve conditions at EMFC, that year MDOC removed GEO Group, the second-largest prison management corporation in the country, as contractor to operate this facility. It replaced the firm by awarding a contract to Management and Training Corporation (MTC) of Utah, the third-largest prison management company in the country. It also had a contract to operate Walnut Grove Youth Correctional Facility and two other state facilities.

=== Class action suit, 2013 ===
Civil rights advocates claimed that conditions at the EMCF did not sufficiently improve under MTC management. In May 2013 the ACLU and the SPLC filed a class-action lawsuit in federal court on behalf of the prisoners at EMCF; it stated "prisoners live in barbaric and horrific conditions and their basic human rights are violated daily." The ACLU said that prisoners do not receive even a basic level of mental health care; many are confined to solitary confinement, which aggravates their problems. The facility is dirty, understaffed, hyper-violent, and poorly supplied.

Allegations included:

rampant rapes. Placing prisoners in solitary confinement for weeks, months or even years at a time, where the only way to get a guard's attention in an emergency is to set a fire. Rat infestations so bad that vermin crawl over prisoners; sometimes, the rats are captured, put on leashes and sold as pets to the most severely mentally ill inmates. Many suicide attempts, some successful. The untreated mentally ill throw feces, scream, start fires, electrocute themselves and self-mutilate. Denying or delaying treatment for infections and even cancer. Stabbings, beatings and other acts of violence. Juveniles being housed with adults, including one 16-year-old who was sexually assaulted by his adult cell mate. Malnourishment and chronic hunger. Officers who deal with prisoners by using physical violence.

Health care can be difficult or impossible for prisoners to access, with documented instances of prisoners who did not receive appropriate care for life-threatening conditions.

In a deposition, a shift captain said that low wages and high turnover contributed to staff problems and the "persistence of security problems and corruption." Experts investigating mental and medical health issues said that records were lacking or non-existent, there were few diagnoses or records of informed consent for treatment, and treatment was minimal, with ill-considered medication of prisoners.

Guards receive only three week's training and are paid even less than guards at state-run institutions. While the state system spends about $40 per inmate per day, the contract for this facility pays only $26.The private company pays bonuses to management for cost-cutting but does not penalized when inmates are denied treatment or die in custody. The company has explained that prisons are supposed to be "tough."

On September 29, 2015, the court granted Plaintiffs' motion for class certification. This allows the case, known as Dockery v. Epps, to proceed as a class action on behalf of all prisoners at EMCF.

== Department of Justice investigations ==
During this period, the United States Department of Justice has investigated EMCF as part of an overall investigation and assessment of the Mississippi prison system. This was especially directed to implement the Prison Rape Elimination Act, passed in 2003. The Department of Justice has worked with state, local and private personnel to implement education and efforts to prevent sexual abuse in prison. A team visiting EMCF toured the facility and records, and interviewed numerous staff and offenders. It issued a PREA audit report on the facility dated May 29, 2015. It has not issued final findings yet. At the time of the audit, MTC had a total of 288 staff at the prison, with 165 involved in providing security.

=== Mississippi prison corruption cases ===
On November 6, 2014 the Federal Government of the United States announced that it had indicted Chris Epps, former Commissioner of Mississippi Department of Corrections (he resigned the day before), on corruption charges; these charges were based on his dealings with the private prison industry and were the result of a 5-year investigation. The federal indictment stated that Cecil B. McCrory, a businessperson who served as the chairperson of the Rankin County School District's board of education and who was a former state legislator, provided Epps with kickbacks and bribes totaling more than $1 million. He paid part of the mortgage of Epps' primary residence in the Jackson area, and additional bribe payments that Epps used to buy his first and second condominiums. In exchange, Epps directed contracts to McCory-owned companies for prison-services contracts, as well as to companies that hired McCrory as a paid consultant. According to the indictment, the activity started in 2007 and ended on March 12, 2014. Epps entered an initial plea of not guilty, and he received a bond of $25,000. The federal investigation had been underway for some time.

In November 2014 Governor Phil Bryant ordered rebids of the contracts that had been awarded by Epps. MTC was still operating EMCF on May 19–20, 2015, when the Department of Justice conducted an audit review of prison operations.

Management and Training Corporation (MTC) is a for-profit prison management company holding a $60 million contract to operate four prisons in the state, including EMCF and two county prisons. MTC said that Epps recommended McCrory as a consultant on their prison contracts but did not insist on his hire; McCrory charged them a rate of $12,000 per month. They said they had not known of any wrongdoing in his activities.

MTC fired McCrory the week following the announcement of the indictments. McCrory had also served as a consultant to GEO Group, MTC's predecessor, which lost its contract as part of a settlement of a class action suit for its failures at Walnut Grove Youth Correctional Facility. The indictment says McCrory also consulted for Cornell Companies, GEO's predecessor at WGYCF which was merged with GEO Group in August 2010.

On December 12, 2014, MSNBC news also reported on the indictments, discussing the context of the private management of prisons in Mississippi and problems revealed in poor conditions and treatment of prisoners. Jody Owens, attorney and investigator with the Southern Poverty Law Center, who has also worked on the EMCF case, was interviewed on The Docket about these bribery allegations.

In February 2015 Epps pleaded guilty to corruption-related charges: one count of filing a false tax return and one count of conspiracy to launder money. As part of the plea, he forfeited two Mercedes-Benz vehicles and his two residences.

Cecil McCrory also pleaded guilty to reduced federal charges. Epps and McCrory each said the other had initiated the bribery scheme. Both men were scheduled to be sentenced on June 9, 2015, but on June 8 federal authorities announced that the sentencing was indefinitely delayed. They said they were pursuing additional indictments. As of February 2017, McCrory has been sentenced and Epps is held in jail pending a sentencing hearing in May 2017.

Besides McCrory, two others pleaded guilty to bribing Epps, and another pleaded not guilty. Harrison County political operative Robert Simmons pleaded guilty to one count of bribery relating to kickbacks he paid to Epps for contracts covering probation services, construction, and construction management. He was scheduled to be sentenced on May 26, 2016. Simmons was also accused of bribing a Harrison County supervisor for a jail medical contract. Carthage, Mississippi businessman and consultant Sam Waggoner pleaded guilty in August 2015 to one count of bribery after waiving indictment in an agreement with prosecutors. He told federal District Court Judge Henry Travillion Wingate that he paid more than $108,000 in kickbacks to Epps from a consulting contract with prison phone company Global Tel-Link (GTL). GTL had a monopoly with the state on phone business in prisons. Waggoner was scheduled to be sentenced on April 14, 2016. Former state lawmaker Irb Benjamin of Madison, Mississippi pleaded not guilty to bribery charges. He is scheduled for trial July 5, 2016, on charges of conspiracy to commit honest services wire fraud and bribery of Epps for contracts at prison work centers and county jails.

In 2016, Cecil McCrory requested that the court allow him to withdraw from the plea bargain and plead "not guilty", going to trial. The court postponed sentencing of Epps again, and ultimately rejected McCrory's request. Prosecutors say Epps received some $1.47 million in bribes and kickbacks. He faces a potential 23-year sentence. The delayed sentencing in order to allow prosecutors to calculate the monetary value of Epps' crimes. Defense lawyer John Colette said Epps wants credit for the assistance he's provided the government in giving evidence against others. Assistant US Attorney LaMarca told Judge Wingate that prosecutors determined that Epps awarded more than $800 million in potentially dirty contracts over seven years ending in 2014. Those are the overall payments from the state to 15 or more companies, to have included MTC, GEO Group and the Corrections Corporation of America (CCA), in addition to companies providing related services. The companies were subpoenaed to provide business records.

Assistant U.S. Attorney Darren LaMarca told Judge Wingate that a grand jury was considering charges against additional people.

== Notable Inmates ==
- John F. Woolard - Serving two life sentences for murder and kidnapping. Sent here after escaping from Mississippi State Prison, in which he received an additional 5 years.

== See also ==
- Private prison
