= Sentinel Offender Services =

- Industry: Criminal Justice
- Founded: 1993
- Headquarters: Anaheim, California
- Website: www.sentineladvantage.com

Sentinel Offender Services is a criminal justice services and original equipment manufacturing company based in Anaheim, California. The company was founded in 1993 by Robert Contestabile, who is currently the chairman. Tom Flies is chief executive officer.

== History ==
Sentinel provides courts, probation and parole departments, law enforcement agencies, and corrections agencies across the country with comprehensive case management and offender-management products, programs and services. The company has served customers in all 50 states and throughout North America. Sentinel pioneered the community-based offender-funded program model beginning in the 1990s in Los Angeles, CA. This allows an offender to pay for services, on a sliding scale based on their income, rather than making taxpayers pay for these services.

== Products and services ==
Sentinel offers several products and services, including:

- GPS location tracking products and monitoring services
- RF (radio frequency) house arrest products and monitoring services
- Domestic violence monitoring program, products and services
- Deep lung breath alcohol products and monitoring services
- Substance abuse testing programs
- Day reporting center programs

All Sentinel programs are backed by a 24/7/365 call center. The company operates field offices. In each location it delivers programs and services that support local agencies with comprehensive offender management.

Sentinel is not a private probation company. The company does not have the power, authority or responsibility to enforce laws and execute warrants. The government agencies with which they contract have this power, authority, and responsibility.

Sentinel contracts with court systems and other agencies to collect fees, fines or restitution amounts on their behalf. Any fees collected are passed directly to the contracted party following agreed upon protocol. As a private services provider to courts, community corrections agencies and law enforcement. Sentinel can only carry out agreed upon contractual obligations on behalf of their customers.

Sentinel does not:

- Issue warrants, citations or fines of any kind;
- Have the power to arrest or incarcerate any individual;
- Have capacity, responsibility or authority to enforce laws, penal codes, acts of legislation, court orders or issued warrants;
- Act as an officer of the court;
- Reflect or represent any political affiliation

== Day Reporting Centers ==
Sentinel has had Day Reporting Centers (DRC) in place in several states for many years. These DRCs provide a central location for offenders to check in with agencies, attend programs, receive services and meet certain court-ordered obligations. Each DRC offers a set of courses based on the unique needs of the local population of offenders being served. Courses and programs that have been offered included GED exam preparation, job skills, Cognitive behavioral therapy, moral reconation therapy, anger management, parenting skills, thinking for good, AA meetings and other substance abuse programs.

The Nevada Division of Parole and Probation opened a DRC in Las Vegas partnership with Sentinel on October 31, 2017. Subsequently, a second DRC was opened in Reno.

The Center for Crime and Justice Policy at the University of Nevada, Las Vegas published a research brief about the DRC in February, 2019. This study was a randomized controlled trial (RCT) conducted among approximately 400 program participants. According to the research brief, primary objectives of a DRC are to:

- Reduce recidivism among at-risk parolees and probationers
- Provide an alternative to incarceration
- Reduce the cost of offender management

According to the research brief, the results of this RCT after 12 months suggest that DRCs can achieve these objectives. The study is ongoing. Previous studies have produced inconclusive results.

== Controversies ==
=== Lawsuits ===
In 2012, James Hucks filed suit against Sentinel Offender Services after an arrest warrant was issued for his wife because she did not pay all the fees she owed to the company during her probation. In 2013, Georgia judge Daniel J. Craig ruled that Sentinel had to refund hundreds, and possibly thousands, of people who had paid them, and that private probation companies cannot collect fees from probationers after their probation has expired. Later that year, Craig granted Sentinel a stay on this ruling, but, despite their attempts to persuade him to back down on it, refused to undo his restrictions. In 2012, Georgia man Tom Barrett stole a can of beer and was later put on probation with Sentinel after being unable to pay a US$200 fine. He was later put in jail for two months after being unable to pay Sentinel's startup fee. As of May 2015, Barrett was suing Sentinel, and was being represented by Augusta attorney Jack Long. On February 17, 2016, the Southern Center for Human Rights filed a lawsuit against Sentinel on behalf of two women from Cleveland, Georgia who were sentenced to 12 months probation each for not paying fines; the lawsuit also claims both women were told they had to undergo drug tests by a probation officer.

=== Monitoring technology controversies ===
In June 2013, Orange County, California discovered that Sentinel's GPS and home detention systems had multiple technical problems, which led the county to cancel their contract with Sentinel. That September, an internal audit by Los Angeles County found that one in four of the Sentinel-made ankle monitors used to monitor serious criminals were faulty. Sentinel attributed many of these problems to errors by county deputies.

=== Epps bribery case ===
In February 2017, Sentinel Offender Services was included in a lawsuit brought by Mississippi Attorney General Jim Hood along with Global Tel Link, Wexford Health Sources, GEO Group and many others for their roles in alleged violations of Mississippi's public ethics, racketeering and antitrust laws.
