= Cornell Companies =

Cornell Companies Inc.
- Type: Public
- Industry: Prisons
- Founded: 1973
- Headquarters: Houston, Texas, United States
- Area served: United States
- Key people: Chris Coonfield, Manager, Investor Relations; James E.Hyman, CEO & President; John R. Nieser, SVP, CFO & Treasurer; Cathryn L. Porter, SVP, General Counsel & Corporate Secretary; Patrick N. Perrin, SVP & Chief Administrative Officer; Benjamin E. Erwin, SVP, Corporate Development & ACB; Michael Caltabiano, SVP, Adult Secure; Jonathan P. Swatsburg, SVP, Abraxas Youth & Family ServicesMarianne Bonetati, Esq. Legal Representative, Managing Director; Brenda Harris, Director HR- Abraxas, Gina Pomilla, VP, Human Resources Adult Secure
- Revenue: ▲US$ 386.7 million (2008)
- Operating income: ▲US$ 62.2 million (2008)
- Net income: ▲US$ 22.2 million (2008)
- Total assets: ▲US$ 636.9 million (2008)
- Total equity: ▲US$ 228.2 million (2008)
- Number of employees: 4,300 – September 2009
- Website: CornellCompanies.com

Cornell Companies (NYSE:CRN) was an American private prison operator with headquarters in Houston, Texas. On August 12, 2010, Cornell was acquired by the GEO Group.

== History ==
Cornell Companies, a corporation with roots in predecessor entities, commenced its operations within the juvenile facilities sector in 1973, followed by the establishment of adult-community-based programs in 1974 and adult secure facilities in 1984. The company was officially incorporated in Delaware as a consolidated entity in 1996. As of 2010, Cornell had fostered enduring relationships with several federal and state customers. Cornell maintained an almost two-decade association with the Bureau of Prisons in their Adult Secure division and a 35-year affiliation with the Bureau of Prisons in the Adult Community-Based division. Furthermore, Cornell held significant contracts with the Departments of Corrections in various states, including Alaska, California, Colorado, Mississippi, and Arizona.

== Business segments ==
Cornell Companies was a corporation that specialized in a diverse range of services within secure and structured environments, operating through three distinct divisions:

1. Adult Secure Services: Cornell's Adult Secure Services division was responsible for offering incarceration services that ranged from minimum- to maximum-security levels. These services were provided to federal, state, and local government agencies.
2. Adult Community-Based Services: Within this division, Cornell focused on supervising adult parolees and probationers. They maintained a national presence with multiple locations in major urban areas across the United States. Cornell held a prominent position as a leading provider of community-based services to both the U.S. Federal Bureau of Prisons and various state corrections departments.
3. Abraxas Youth and Family Services: The Abraxas Youth & Family Services division encompassed a variety of services, including residential, detention, shelter care, and community-based services. Additionally, this division offered educational, rehabilitation, and treatment programs designed for juveniles typically falling within the age range of 10 to 18 years old.

== Employees ==
At December 31, 2008, Cornell had 4,109 full-time employees and 300 part-time employees. Cornell employs management, administrative and clerical, security, educational and counselling services, health services and general maintenance personnel.

== Controversies ==
Frank Prewitt, Cornell's consultant in Alaska, acknowledged making a prohibited campaign contribution in 2002 that was actually from Cornell. It could have resulted in a civil fine or written warning if the violation had come to the attention of the Alaska Public Offices Commission. The issue was moot because fines or warnings for Alaska campaign contribution violations can only be issued within twelve months of the alleged violation (Alaska Statutes 15.56.130). Cornell Alaska partner Bill Weimar subsequently pleaded guilty to two counts of corruption and was sentenced to federal prison.

Cornell Corrections was awarded a Mississippi state contract to operate the Walnut Grove Correctional Facility (WGCF) in September 2003. The number of prisoners at the facility increased, but Cornell did not adjust staffing appropriately. A state audit in 2005 showed the guard to prisoner ratio was 1 to 60, which was believed to contribute to the rate of violence and abuses. According to the Council for Juvenile Correctional Administrators, a ratio of 1 to 10 or 12 is more common. In addition, prisoners were ageing; by 2006 prisoners up to age 21 were housed there. Older prisoners in their early 20s were added during expansion of the capacity. These changes made conditions more harsh for younger inmates. As of 2006 the prison housed 950 prisoners ages 12 to 21. The 200 prison guard jobs helped employ townspeople who had been laid off by closure of a local garment manufacturing plant. Walnut Grove received payment in lieu of taxes from the prison corporation, monies that made up 15% of its annual budget. William Grady Sims, mayor of Walnut Grove since 1981, profited from the revenues of 18 vending machines he had installed at the WGCF. By 2009, the prison had 1,225 prisoners. Its prisoner base had aged, and the state had also assigned older prisoners there, endangering younger inmates. Cornell Companies operated the prison until August 12, 2010, when Cornell was bought by GEO Group. In November 2010, plaintiffs represented by the Southern Poverty Law Center and the ACLU National Prison Project filed a federal class-action lawsuit against GEO and the state agencies that contracted for the facility, saying that the prison authorities allowed abuses and negligence to occur at the facility. The lawsuit stated that prison guards engaged in sexual intercourse with the prisoners, tolerated and encouraged violence, smuggled illegal drugs into the facilities, and that prison authorities denied required education and sufficient medical care. As of that month the prison had about 1,200 prisoners ages 13–22; the lawsuit said that half of the prisoners were incarcerated for nonviolent offenses. Weeks prior to the filing of the lawsuit, United States Department of Justice officials informed Governor of Mississippi Haley Barbour that the department had started an investigation concerning the prison. In addition to learning about prisoner abuses, investigators found that prison officials were being paid bonuses from federal funds for "administering" education in the prison. That was reviewed separately by the Office of the Inspector General at the US Department of Education.
