= El Valle Detention Facility =

- Location in Texas
- Location: Raymondville, Texas; 26.4703°N 97.75865°W
- Status: Operational
- Security class: Dedicated Migrant Detention Center
- Population: 941 (FY 2026 (YTD))
- Opened: July 2018

The El Valle Detention Facility is a privately run immigration detention facility in Raymondville, Texas, under the auspices of United States Immigration and Customs Enforcement (ICE). The facility opened in 2018 on the site of the Willacy County Correctional Center, which was itself an immigration detention facility, operating on behalf of ICE and later the Federal Bureau of Prisons. The operator of both El Valle and the prior facilities is Management & Training Corporation.

== Detainees ==
Venezuelan detainees held at El Valle were subject to an attempted deportation under the Alien Enemies Act in 2025, which was blocked by multiple Federal court rulings.

Immigrant and court translator Meenu Batra was held at El Valle during her six weeks of detention in 2026, despite having legal authorization to live in the United States.

Average daily population at El Valle Detention Facility
Fiscal year	ADP
FY 2019	697
FY 2020	610
FY 2021	380
FY 2022	395
FY 2023	645
FY 2024	834
FY 2025	853
FY 2026	941
