= 2010 Arizona prison escape =

On July 30, 2010, three inmates escaped from the Kingman Arizona State Prison, operated as a for-profit medium-security prison in Golden Valley by Utah's Management and Training Corporation. It was owned by the Mohave County Industrial Development Authority. A female accomplice assisted the escape. Over the next three weeks, local law enforcement captured prisoners Daniel Renwick in Colorado; Tracy Province in Wyoming; and finally, with the U.S. Marshals, John McCluskey in Arizona, along with the trio's accomplice Casslyn Welch.

In 2011 Renwick was sentenced to 48 years in prison in Colorado. McCluskey, Province and Welch were subsequently indicted for their parts in the carjacking and murder of a couple in New Mexico after they escaped from prison. They were extradited and tried in New Mexico. Province and Welch pleaded guilty in a plea bargain; in 2014 Province was sentenced to life and Welch to 40 years. A day later an ailing McCluskey was convicted of the murders and on June 3, 2014, he was sentenced to life plus 235 years after a jury was unable to agree on the death penalty. He died in the Florence, Colorado federal supermax prison on March 7, 2017.

The state investigated the escape, holding MTC responsible for numerous security failures. Following findings that the company had failed to control a riot at Kingman prison in July 2015, in August 2015 the governor terminated MTC's contract with the state. It awarded the contract to GEO Group.

This prison management company had been forced out of a multi-facility contract with the Mississippi Department of Corrections in 2012 as part of settlement of a federal class-action suit over the mistreatment of prisoners and failure to provide adequate security at Walnut Grove Youth Correctional Facility. In 2017 the Mississippi State Attorney announced a civil suit for damages against MTC, GEO Group and numerous other contractors in connection with a federal investigation of corruption known as Operation Mississippi Hustle, in which numerous individuals had been convicted and sentenced by the end of 2016.

== Escapes ==
The three inmates who escaped, Tracy Alan Province (born September 18, 1967), Daniel Kelly Renwick (born August 10, 1973), and John Charles McCluskey (born February 27, 1965), were each previously convicted of violent crimes; two were convicted of murder. Province was serving a life sentence for murder and armed robbery, and Renwick was serving two consecutive 22-year terms for two murders. McCluskey was serving two 15-year terms for attempted second-degree murder and other crimes. They escaped the prison with the help of female accomplice Casslyn Mae Welch (born July 21, 1966), a first cousin of McCluskey. She was on his visitation list and lived in Mesa, Arizona. In June 2010, Welch had been arrested outside Kingman prison and accused of attempting to smuggle drugs in the prison, but was released.

On the evening of July 30, Welch drove a Chevy Blazer behind the prison and threw small bolt cutters and lineman's pliers over a chain-linked fence to the three prisoners. The inmates cut a hole in the fence, abandoned the tools, and escaped. Alarms went off around 9 p.m. local time related to the perimeter fence breaching activity but guards did not respond.

Having separated outside the fence from the other three, Renwick absconded with the getaway car. McCluskey, Province, and Welch walked eight miles to Interstate 40 and hijacked a semi-trailer truck stopped alongside an on-ramp, forcing the drivers at gunpoint into the sleeper. McCluskey drove the truck and left it, with the drivers unharmed, in Flagstaff.

== Captures ==
At 12:47 a.m. on August 1 in Rifle, Colorado, approximately 670 miles (1,080 km) from the prison, Renwick was arrested. A Garfield County sheriff's deputy responding to a suspicious vehicle call spotted him driving McCluskey's brown Chevy Blazer. Renwick fired a gun at a police car that had joined the chase after the officer activated emergency lights. Along with the deputy's cruiser, the officer gave chase on Interstate 70 eastbound, rammed the SUV at the parking lot of Red River Inn in Rifle, and arrested Renwick without further incident.

Province was apprehended on August 8 in Meeteetse, Wyoming, near Yellowstone National Park, carrying a sign reading "Casper" and a handgun. The previous day, Province visited the Meeteetse Community Church and sang along with its congregation. One worshipper later stated that Province looked like the many local hitchhikers. The pastor of the church paid Province $40 and gave him a jacket for mowing the church lawn. Province told a news reporter that he escaped from prison because he did not want to die there.

McCluskey and Welch were presumed to be headed toward Canada after being spotted in Billings, Montana on August 6. They were reportedly next seen in Gentry, Arkansas, where they robbed a beauty salon.

At 7 p.m. on August 19, 2010, a tactical-response team of Apache County, Arizona sheriff's deputies, with the help of the Arizona Department of Public Safety and United States Forest Service, captured the duo at a campground near Sunrise Ski Resort. Earlier that day, a U.S. Forest Service employee approached what he thought was an unattended fire and found a Nissan Sentra backed into trees. After he reported it, it was discovered that the license plate had been stolen from a vehicle in Moriarty, New Mexico.

The Forest Service reported the sighting to the United States Marshals command post in Phoenix.

== Subsequent criminal proceedings ==
On April 22, 2011, Renwick was consecutively sentenced to 48 years in Colorado state prison for one count of attempted first degree murder plus 12 more for a second count, involving shooting at law enforcement personnel. To avoid the costs of extradition and trial, the escape charges from the for-profit prison in Mohave were dropped. He had 32 years left to serve on his original two Arizona second-degree murder convictions, should he be released from the Colorado prison system.

The Federal Bureau of Investigation in Albuquerque accused McCluskey, Province, and Welch of carjacking Gary and Linda Haas, a couple from Tecumseh, Oklahoma; their pickup truck, and trailer at an Interstate 40 rest stop in Quay County, New Mexico. They killed the Haases in their trailer, then continued driving west to Santa Rosa, New Mexico. After noticing blood coming from the trailer, the trio drove their car and the pickup to a remote farm near Colonias in Guadalupe County, New Mexico. There they abandoned and burned the trailer with the remains of the victims inside.

The men all faced charges of escaping prison and Welch of assisting their escape. McCluskey's mother Claudia Washburn and ex-wife Diana Joy Glattfelder were each separately arrested on suspicion of aiding the escapees. All the fugitives were booked into county jails locally, with McCluskey and Welch reported to be in solitary confinement.

On August 10, 2010, Province signed a waiver of extradition from Wyoming and declined to be provided with a public defender. An Albuquerque federal grand jury on September 30 indicted McCluskey, Province, and Welch on capital murder and carjacking charges related to the deaths of the Gary and Linda Haas. Federal magistrate W. Daniel Schneider signed an extradition order on October 25 to New Mexico for the three.

On December 17, Mohave County judge Steven Conn denied a motion by Province's attorney Ron Gilleo to hold Province's trial outside the county, ruling that despite the negative media coverage, there could be a fair jury locally.

In Maricopa County Superior Court, McCluskey's mother, Claudia Washburn, pleaded guilty to hindering prosecution on November 24, admitting as part of a plea deal that she supplied her son with money through a third party. On January 7, 2011, Washburn was sentenced to seven months in prison. McCluskey's ex-wife Glattfelder pleaded guilty to attempting to hinder prosecution on November 30 and faced sentencing on January 7, 2011.

McCluskey, Province and Welch were indicted for murder by Kenneth J. Gonzales, the U.S. Attorney in Albuquerque, New Mexico, who said he would seek the death penalty. (He is now a federal District Court judge.) All three were extradited from Arizona to face charges in New Mexico for the alleged robbery, hijack and murder of the Haas couple there. Retired federal judge James Aubrey Parker offered to mediate the plea bargain to save the expenditure of the anticipated millions of dollars on the murder trials and appeals, but his offer was refused by Gonzales.

McCluskey's trial began with jury selection on July 22, 2013. He was convicted on October 7, 2013. Province and Welch testified against him, per conditions of their respective plea bargains, as did Glattfelder.

The death penalty phase of the proceedings began on October 21. On December 11, 2013, after a five-month trial, McCluskey was found to be not eligible for the death penalty. Three jurors voted against the capital charge.

In his summation, McCluskey's attorney, Gary Mitchell, said “We’re going to decide if you’re going to kill a man already dying of Crohn’s disease, hepatitis C, and gout." A lifer, McCluskey died at Colorado's federal supermax ADX Florence prison on March 7, 2017, two years, nine months and four days after he was sentenced. He was 52.

Steven Yarborough, then acting U.S. Attorney for New Mexico, was asked by reporters if the millions spent on the trial was worth it. He said it had not been his decision.

== Sentencing of final three defendants ==
The sentencing hearing of McCluskey took place on June 3, 2014. He received life imprisonment plus 235 years. Province was sentenced to life in prison the preceding day, per a plea bargain in exchange for testimony against McCluskey. Welch, 47, was also sentenced on June 2, receiving 40 years, per her own plea bargain. Her defense had requested a 20-year sentence and the prosecution acknowledged that Welch had provided "substantial assistance" against her co-defendants. But U.S. District Judge Judith C. Herrera noted that Welch would have faced life plus 85 years in prison had she not provided assistance. Mark Fleming, attorney for Welch in what began as a death penalty case against all three defendants, characterized the 40 years as a de facto life sentence for his client. In March 2015, Welch was also sentenced to a 20-year Arizona sentence, to run concurrently with her federal term.

== Death of McCluskey ==
John McCluskey died at the age of 52 on March 7, 2017, at a maximum-security federal prison outside of Florence, Colorado.

== Security problems at privately managed prison ==
A state report on the escape outlined security breakdowns, under MTC operations of the privately run prison, that contributed to the escape:

- The alarm system falsely went off so often that prison personnel often ignored it; 89 alarms sounded during the 16 hours around the time of the escape.
- Eight yard floodlights were burned out.
- Prison guards lacked proper firearms training, and the prison lacked a proper weapons inventory.
- 75% of inmates did not have proper identification.

After the capture, Arizona moved 148 Kingman inmates to other prisons and added restrictions qualifying which inmates were eligible to be held in minimum- and medium-security prisons. The late Management & Training Corporation (MTC) founder Robert L. Marquardt said that this was the "first major glitch" of the corporation. But the media have reported that MTC operated prisons in which there had been at least a dozen prior escapes in four other states, as well as many prisoner riots and murders in their prisons in five states and Canada. Mohave County, Arizona sent MTC a bill of $23,587.68 related to pursuing and capturing the fugitives.

Terry Goddard, Arizona Attorney General and Democratic gubernatorial nominee in 2010 was challenging incumbent Republican governor Jan Brewer. Goddard said about the escape: "The Brewer administration has consistently promoted private over public prisons, in spite of the public safety risk. The escape of these two violent offenders makes it clear how dangerous this policy has been."

== 2015 MTC contract termination ==
Following a state finding that MTC had failed to manage a riot at Kingman in July 2015, In August 2015 Arizona governor Doug Ducey terminated their contract. An Arizona Department of Corrections investigative report concluded that the company had "a culture of disorganization, disengagement, and disregard" of DOC policies. Five competitor for-profit prison corporations indicated an interest in operating the facilities upon MTC's departure. Arizona awarded its contract for private management of prisons to GEO Group, effective December 1, 2015.

In 2012 the GEO Group had been forced out of its contract to operate four prisons for the Mississippi Department of Corrections as part of the federal settlement of a class-action suit over the mistreatment of prisoners at Walnut Grove Youth Correctional Facility in Leake County, Mississippi. In 2017 the Mississippi State Attorney announced a civil suit for damages against MTC, GEO Group and numerous other contractors in connection with a federal investigation of corruption known as Operation Mississippi Hustle, in which numerous individuals had been convicted and sentenced by the end of 2016.

GEO had contributed $2,000 to Ducey's 2014 campaign for Governor, plus $50,000 more to an Independent expenditure SuperPAC that exclusively supported Ducey's candidacy.

== See also ==
- Capital punishment in Arizona
