= Columbia Correctional Institution (Florida) =

State prison in Lake City, Florida, US

Coordinates: 30°11′36″N 82°30′09″W

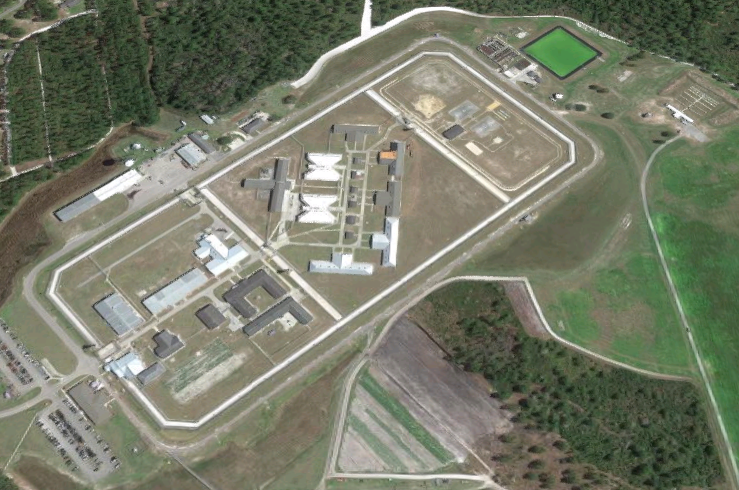
- Overhead image of main unit
- Interactive map of Columbia Correctional Institution
- Location: 216 S.E. Corrections Way Lake City, Florida
- Status: Operational
- Security class: Minimum, medium, and closed
- Capacity: 2,835 = 1,269 (main) + 1,566 (annex)
- Population: 2,233 = 730 (main) + 1,503 (annex) (January 14, 2025)
- Opened: 1992
- Managed by: Florida Department of Corrections
- Warden: John Godwin

Columbia Correctional Institution is a state-operated prison for men located in Lake City, Columbia County, Florida. The facility, which first opened in 1992, has a mix of security levels, including community, minimum, medium, and close, with a capacity of 1,269 inmates.

The Columbia Annex opened in October 2004 and can accommodate another 1,566 inmates at the same security levels. Both prisons are near the Lake City Correctional Facility, a privately run prison that also holds state inmates.

== History ==
In March 2012, a Columbia correctional officer sergeant named Ruben Thomas was stabbed to death by an inmate. In April 2016 a correctional officer received stab wounds from a prisoner, and the next morning a schizophrenic inmate being held in protective custody was found dead.

In 2016, Florida State Representative David Richardson toured the prison, with his initial visit occurring on November 23 of that year. Inmates personally made numerous complaints to him about poor facilities, and Richardson described the facilities as "unfit for human habitation".

== Notable inmates ==
- Jonathan Silva – Found guilty of first-degree murder for the murder of his friend Jerry Lee Alley. The story was profiled on A&E's Killer Kids.
- Michael Hernandez – Convicted of first-degree murder of a classmate at his school and attempted first-degree murder for another classmate. He died at the institution in April 2021, at the age of 31.
- Willie James Hodges - Convicted of first-degree murder of Patricia Belanger during a burglary. Formerly on death row and resentenced to life in 2022.
- Randy Schoenwetter – Convicted of the murders of Ronald and Virginia Friskey. Formerly on death row at Union Correctional Institution and resentenced to life in 2021.
