= Willacy County State Jail =

Prison in Texas, United States

Coordinates: 26°28′01″N 97°46′03″W

- Interactive map of Willacy County State Jail
- Location: 1695 South Buffalo Drive Raymondville, Texas
- Status: Operational
- Capacity: 1,069
- Opened: 1996
- Managed by: Texas Department of Criminal Justice

The Willacy County State Jail is a medium-security prison for men located in Raymondville, Willacy County, Texas, operated by the Texas Department of Criminal Justice. It has an official capacity of 1,069 inmates.

This facility is adjacent to two other private prison sites: the Willacy County Correctional Center, closed in 2015, and the Willacy County Regional Detention Center, both operated by MTC for the federal government.

This facility was first opened by Wackenhut, now GEO Group, in 1996. On April 26, 2001 inmate Gregorio De La Rosa, Jr. was beaten to death by other prisoners. This incident caused a $42.5 million civil settlement against Wackenhut.

== Notable Inmates ==
Inmate Name	Register Number	Status	Details
Mark Howerton	50644897 / 02457695	Serving a 20-year sentence. Eligible for parole in 2033.	Convicted of aggravated assault for the 2017 death of Cayley Mandadi.
