= Columbia Correctional Institution =

Columbia Correctional Institution may refer to:

- Columbia Correctional Institution (Florida)
- Columbia Correctional Institution (Wisconsin)
