= Jennifer Fichter =

American teacher and convict

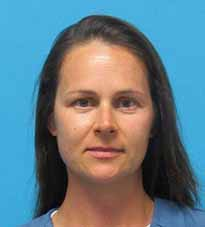
- Born: December 8, 1984 (age 41); United States
- Education: Paxon School for Advanced Studies; University of Florida (BA)
- Occupation: English teacher
- Years active: 2007–2014
- Employer(s): Robinswood Middle School (Orange County, Florida), Kathleen High School
- Criminal charge: Sexual battery
- Criminal penalty: 22 years' imprisonment
- Criminal status: Convicted and incarcerated

Jennifer Christine Fichter (born December 8, 1984) is an American former teacher who was convicted in Polk County, Florida, United States, in 2015 of sexual battery against three 17-year-old male students. She was sentenced to 22 years imprisonment.

== Early life and career ==
Jennifer Fichter was born on December 8, 1984, and graduated from Paxon School for Advanced Studies in Jacksonville, Florida, in June 2003. She then attended the University of Florida from August 2003 to December 2006 earning a Bachelor of Arts Degree majoring in English. She held instructional teaching positions at Robinswood Middle School, Orange County, Florida, from August 13, 2007, to December 19, 2008, when she resigned pending the outcome an investigation for alleged offenses of inappropriate behavior.

== Sexual abuse, trial, and sentencing ==
Fichter was hired as an English teacher at Kathleen High School on August 29, 2011, and was paid US$40,530 per year. Fichter was fired by the Polk County School Board on April 22, 2014, after her arrest for molesting three of her male students, all 17 years old, more than 37 times between August 2012 and April 2014.

As of June 7, 2014, Fichter was being held in the Polk County Jail with a bond set at US$520,000. Fichter was convicted and, on July 2, 2015, was sentenced to 22 years' imprisonment. A Polk County judge called her a predator during sentencing. The sentencing by Judge Glenn T. Shelby was immediately controversial, with the unusually long sentence being reviled by many, especially in Europe. Fichter is currently imprisoned in Gadsden Correctional Facility and is scheduled for release on May 19, 2033, when she will be age 48.

== See also ==
- Debra Lafave
- Ephebophilia
- Mary Kay Letourneau
- Miss Teacher Bangs a Boy
- Pamela Joan Rogers
- Sexual harassment in education
- Female on male statutory rape
