= Lane McCotter =

- Occupation: Prison administrator
- Known for: Formerly in charge of the reconstruction of the Abu Ghraib prison in Iraq

Lane McCotter is a controversial United States prison administrator, formerly in charge of the reconstruction of the Abu Ghraib prison in Iraq.

== Government employment ==
Lane McCotter is a retired lieutenant colonel, whose service included Special Forces Ranger in the 101st Airborne Division and later as a Green Beret, during the Vietnam War. Post-Vietnam, he was appointed as warden of the U.S. military prison at Ft. Leavenworth, Kansas through 1984; as Assistant Director, then Executive Director of the Texas Department of Criminal Justice (1985–1987); as Cabinet Secretary for the New Mexico Corrections Department (1987–1992); and as Director of the Utah Department of Corrections (1992–1997).

== Texas ==
During McCotter's administration of the Texas prisons, the system was criticized for overcrowding and violence, resulting in 12 deaths. At one point, U.S. District Judge William Wayne Justice was threatening to fine the State $1000 a day if improvements were not made. It became an issue in the 1986 Texas gubernatorial campaign, and in 1987 newly elected Texas Governor Bill Clements pressured McCotter to resign.

== Michael Valent ==
In 1997, McCotter resigned his post with Utah’s corrections system after Michael Valent, a 29-year-old schizophrenic inmate, died after being strapped naked to a restraint chair for 16 hours when he refused to remove a pillowcase from his head. Death resulted from blood clots that formed in Valent's immobilized legs and blocked an artery to his heart. The incident was videotaped, publicised nationally, and served as the basis for a lawsuit from Valent's family against the State to stop further use of the device, also naming McCotter.

== Management and Training Corporation ==
McCotter was subsequently hired as Director of Corrections Business Development for the private sector, Centerville, Utah, based prison and education company Management and Training Corporation (MTC) that manages a number of prisons in the Southwestern United States, Australia, and Canada. In March 2003, he was in charge at the Santa Fe County Detention Center, when a United States Department of Justice team, investigating civil rights violations there, filed a report concluding that conditions violated inmates' constitutional rights, that they suffered "harm or the risk of serious harm" from insufficient healthcare and basic living conditions, citing numerous examples, and threatening a lawsuit if conditions did not improve.

== Abu Ghraib ==
Not long after, on May 20, 2003, Attorney General of the United States John Ashcroft announced that McCotter, along with three other corrections advisers, would be sent to Iraq to assist in assessing criminal justice needs of the Country. His role was to formulate a long term plan for Iraqi prisons. The initial plan the group presented called for construction of four brand new state of the art prison facilities.

In January 2004, McCotter said that his team reviewed the entire Iraqi criminal justice system, supervised reconstruction of the prisons, and trained Iraqi citizens to work in the prisons, including the one at Abu Ghraib, but that prison was empty during their tenure, and they never supervised any military personnel.

The initial plan for building four new prisons in Iraq was not funded by Congress. Because of pressing need, a backup plan was instituted to use existing facilities to house Iraqi criminals. McCotter assisted in refurbishing the physical facilities that would later be used to house inmates, again, including Abu Graib.

McCotter completed his assessments and oversaw refurbishments then returned to the US. Several months after his return to the US the first post invasion prisoner was housed at Abu Graib by military personnel.

In the following months, the national media broke the Abu Graib story, and after intensive investigation McCotter was found to have no role in the management of any prisoners, nor military personnel. There, however, was a much heated debate, including a floor discussion, in the US Senate specifically accusing McCotter of wrongdoing.

== Notes ==
- Ex-head of TDCJ set up Iraq jail Houston Chronicle article
- Fade Back to the Sixteenth Century: Restraints at the Utah State Prison ACLU Utah article about the death of Michael Valent
- Department of Justice : Investigation of Findings at the Santa Fe County Adult Detention Center PDF document
- DEPARTMENT OF JUSTICE SENDS 25 ADVISORS TO IRAQ IN SUPPORT OF PROVISIONAL AUTHORITY EFFORT TO RECONSTRUCT CRIMINAL SYSTEM Press release from Department of Justice
- SCHUMER: PRISON OFFICIAL WITH CHECKERED PAST PUT IN POWER POSITION AT ABU GHRAIB Press release from Charles Schumer, Senator from New York.
- Management & Training Corporation
