= North Central Correctional Complex =

Prison in Marion, Ohio, United States

Coordinates: 40°37′00″N 83°06′54″W

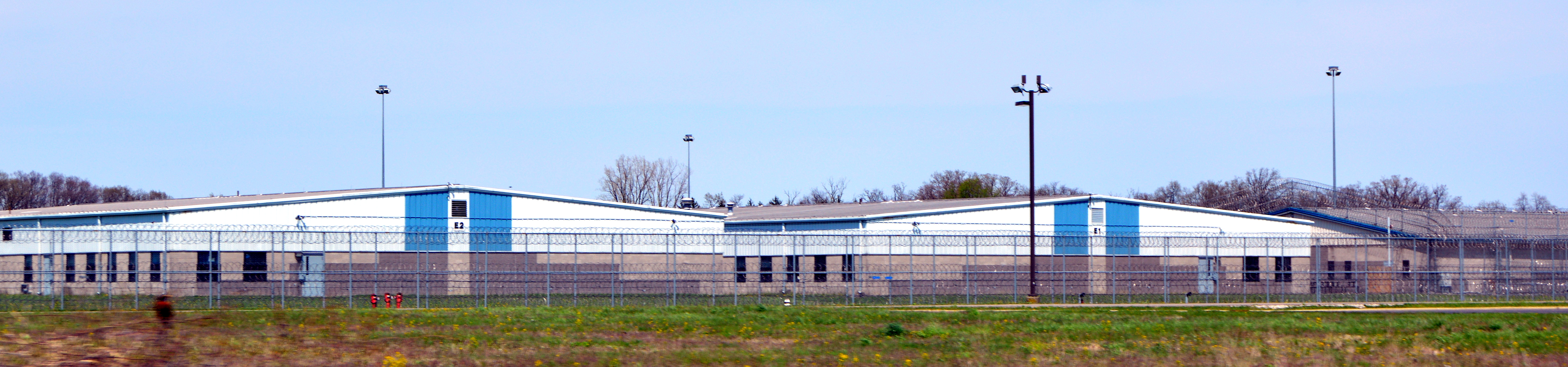
- Interactive map of North Central Correctional Complex
- Location: 670 Marion-Williamsport Rd East Marion, Ohio
- Status: open
- Security class: medium and minimum
- Capacity: 2893
- Opened: 1994
- Managed by: Management and Training Corporation

The North Central Correctional Complex is a minimum- and medium-security prison for men located in Marion, Marion County, Ohio, operated by Management and Training Corporation under contract with the Ohio Department of Rehabilitation and Correction.

The facility first opened in 1994 and has a working population of 2893 state inmates. The facility is owned by the state and has been under MTC management since the end of 2011.

== Notable inmates ==
- Robert Cordell, pleaded guilty to the murder of Kathleen Cordell, Frank Carnevale, and Rita Bushman.
- DeMarcus Maurice Smith, convicted for role in 1992 Dayton Christmas murders.
