= Bluebonnet Detention Center =

Prison in Texas, US

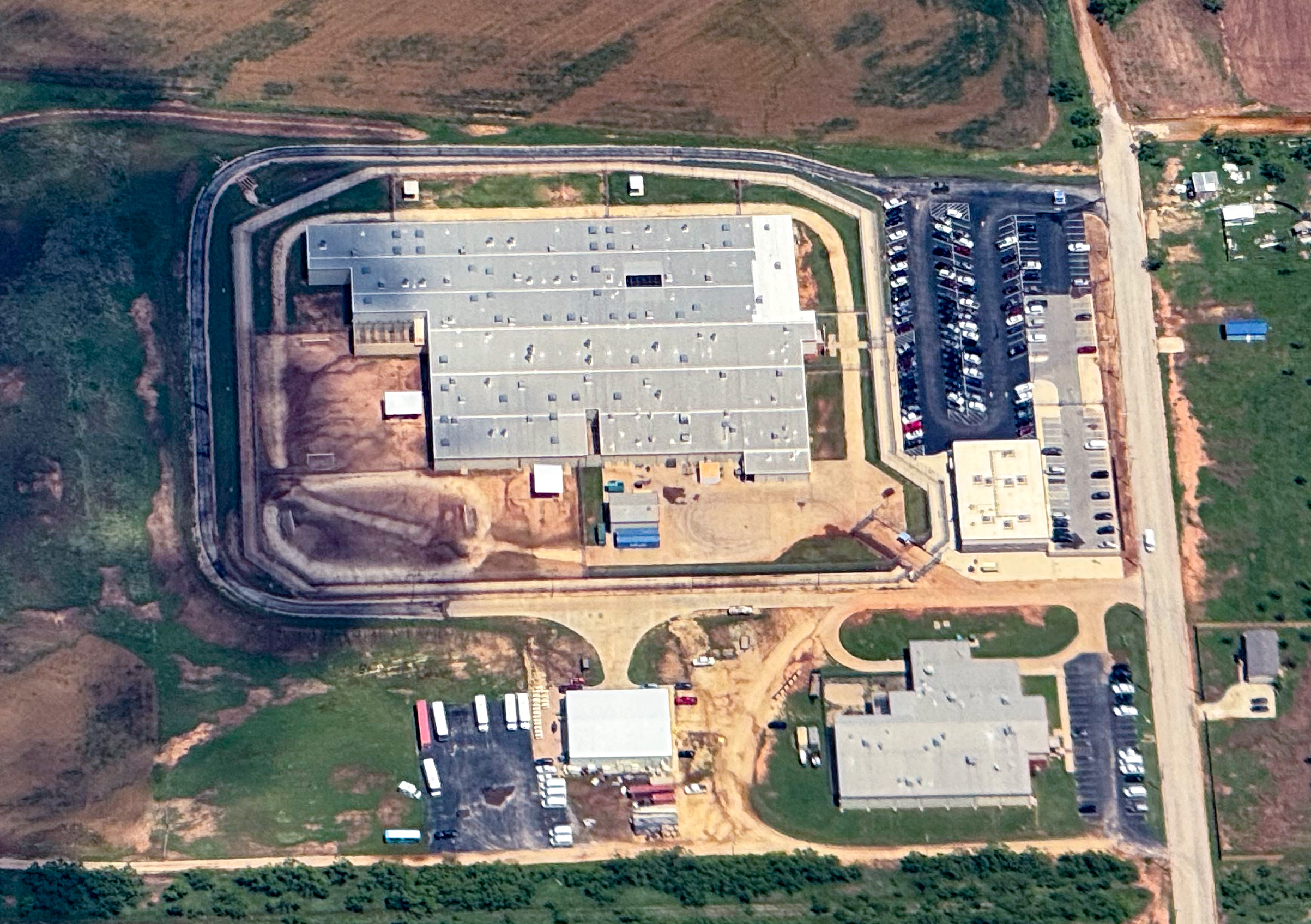

- Location in Texas
- Location: Anson, Texas; 32.76765°N 99.88808°W
- Status: Operational
- Security class: Dedicated Migrant Detention Center
- Population: 1044 (FY 2026 (YTD))
- Opened: FY 2020

The Bluebonnet Detention Center is a prison in Anson, Texas, operated by the Management and Training Corporation (MTC) under contract for U.S. Immigration and Customs Enforcement (ICE).

The 1100-bed 122,000 square feet (11,300 m^{2}) facility was built in 2010 (as the Texas Midwest/Jones County Detention Center) to house Texas Department of Criminal Justice prisoners. Immediately after the prison was constructed, the state rescinded the contract, leaving $35 million in bonds unresolved. GEO Group was in discussions to buy the facility in 2017 to house ICE prisoners, but the deal fell through.

A five-year contract for $145 million was signed in 2019 to house ICE detainees by MTC. The contract pays $106 per day per detainee.

== Detained population ==
Average daily population at Bluebonnet Detention Center
Fiscal year	ADP
FY 2020	258
FY 2021	393
FY 2022	389
FY 2023	544
FY 2024	656
FY 2025	972
FY 2026	1,044

== See also ==
- W.M.M. v. Trump
