= Eagle Mountain Community Correctional Facility =

Prison in Eagle Mountain, California, USA

Coordinates: 33°51′22″N 115°29′16″W

- Interactive map of Eagle Mountain Community Correctional Facility
- Location: 120 Court Street, Desert Center (Eagle Mountain), California
- Status: closed
- Capacity: 436
- Opened: 1988
- Closed: 2003
- Managed by: Management and Training Corporation

Eagle Mountain Community Correctional Facility was a privately operated state correctional facility for men located in the modern California mining ghost town of Eagle Mountain, California. The prison opened in a converted shopping center in 1988, operated by the Utah-based prison operator Management and Training Corporation under contract with the California Department of Corrections for the housing of 436 low-risk inmates. The prison became the area's largest employer.

On October 25, 2003, a 90-minute riot broke out over viewing the 2003 World Series, involving 150 prisoners nearing release fighting predominantly along racial lines. Inmates attacked each other with kitchen knives, meat cleavers, broom handles, dust pans, rocks, pipes, crutches and fire extinguishers. The privately employed guards retreated, while state correctional officers were called in from Ironwood and Chuckawalla state prisons in Blythe, 61 miles distant. Two black inmates were stabbed to death, seven others were critically injured, and dozens more hurt. Eight inmates were ultimately charged with and convicted of murder.

The facility was closed later in 2003.

A proposed adaptive reuse analysis for the prison was done in 2007 by architectural firm DMJM (now part of AECOM). The study recommended against re-opening the facility, based in part on its isolated location, the physical condition of the plant, and the fact that the demand for this level of correctional facility has been undercut by work release, home confinement, work furlough, treatment programs, and other state programs.
