= Epes, Alabama =

Town in Alabama U.S.

- Town
- Location of Epes in Sumter County, Alabama.
- Coordinates: 32°41′25″N 88°7′27″W
- Country: United States
- State: Alabama
- County: Sumter

Area
  - Total: 6.60 sq mi (17.09 km^{2})
  - Land: 6.59 sq mi (17.06 km^{2})
  - Water: 0.012 sq mi (0.03 km^{2})
- Elevation: 125 ft (38 m)

Population (2020)
  - Total: 272
  - Density: 41.3/sq mi (15.95/km^{2})
- Time zone: UTC-6 (Central (CST))
  - Summer (DST): UTC-5 (CDT)
- ZIP code: 35460
- Area codes: 205, 659
- FIPS code: 01-24256
- GNIS feature ID: 2406456
- Website: epesal.com/home/

Epes /ˈɛps/ is a town in Sumter County, Alabama, United States. Initially called Epes Station, it was incorporated as Epes in 1899. At the 2020 census the population was 272, up from 192 in 2010.

== Geography ==
Epes is located near Jones Bluff, overlooking the Tombigbee River.

According to the U.S. Census Bureau, the town has a total area of 1.9 square miles (4.9 km^{2}), all land.

=== Climate ===
The climate in this area is characterized by hot, humid summers and generally mild to cool winters. According to the Köppen Climate Classification system, Epes has a humid subtropical climate, abbreviated "Cfa" on climate maps.

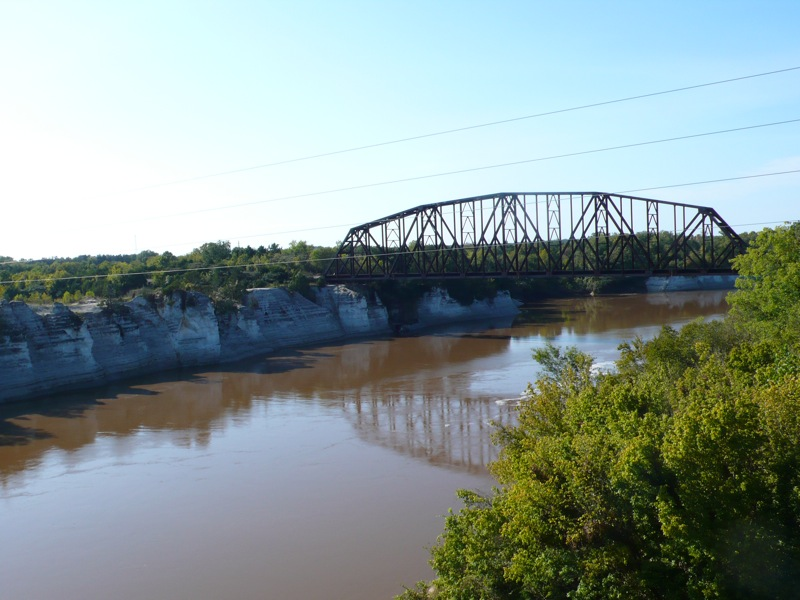
Crossing the Tenn-Tom Waterway at Epes, Alabama (railroad bridge seen from U.S. Route 11 bridge)

== History ==
=== 18th century ===
Epes has its origins in Fort de Tombecbé (Fort Tombecbe), one of the major fortifications built under Louis XIV, in what is now the American south, in the early eighteenth century. In January 1736, Jean-Baptiste Le Moyne, Sieur de Bienville, governor of Louisiana, recruited a Swiss officer serving with the French, Joseph Christophe de Lusser, to construct a fort on the Tombigbee River, "atop an 80-foot bluff to support his campaign against the Chickasaws" that was to proceed in the year following; Bienville visited the site in April of the same year, and took control of the construction, leading to its completion and its support of his martial efforts against the Native Americans. After a 26-year stay, during which the French used this and other holdings to check "westward expansion by the British into the French colony of Louisiana," and to serve "as a trading post, solidifying France's relations with the Choctaws... the most powerful French ally in the area," the French ceded the fort, with most of its North American territory, to Great Britain under the Treaty of Paris, surrendering Tombecbé in November 1763; the British inspected and renamed it Fort York, although its actual inhabitation would await a recurrence of hostilities between the Choctaw and Creek Indians in 1766. Records of those overseeing the fort in this period document the challenge of supplying such a remote location, and after a 1768 truce ended the hostilities between the Choctaw and Creeks, the British abandoned Fort York, with Choctaws being the remaining inhabitants of the area until this tribe ceded a small parcel of land that included the fort to the Spanish in 1792/1793, under the Treaty of Boucfouca. Because little of the original fortification structures remained when Spain arrived to take control in 1794, the Spanish chose to construct "a smaller but more substantial earthen structure" (rather than building further wooden fortifications); they renamed the site and their resulting structure Fort Confederacion, in recognition of the alliance the Spanish had struck with Native American groups to assist them in resisting encroachment by commerce and settlements from the United States. Fortifications were completed before the beginning of 1796, in time to provide support to the Spanish when war broke out with the United States, and when hostilities began again between the Chickasaw and Creek Indians; the Treaty of San Lorenzo, between Spain and the young U.S., ended that part of the hostilities, and ceded Spanish territory "above the 31st parallel," including the Fort, to the U.S., "thus marking the end of the European colonial era in Alabama."

=== 19th and 20th centuries ===
Epes was incorporated in 1899 and named for Dr. John W. Epes, who donated the right-of-way for Southern Railroad (if the town would be named Epes). The town is located on the high bluffs of the Tombigbee River. Standing on the bluffs, locals could hear the ferries and steamboats traveling down river. During its prime, it was known as the transportation and business and service center. It had three cotton gins, a cotton compress, cotton seed oil mill, creamery, handle company, The Casey Hotel, The Bowers Boarding House, a school, two grocery stores, a drug store, general merchandising stores, and two livery stables. The second stockyard in Alabama opened in Epes in 1936.

== Demographics ==
Historical population
Census	Pop.	Note	%±
1880	53		—
1900	331		—
1910	374		13.0%
1920	722		93.0%
1930	362		−49.9%
1940	328		−9.4%
1950	342		4.3%
1960	337		−1.5%
1970	293		−13.1%
1980	399		36.2%
1990	267		−33.1%
2000	206		−22.8%
2010	192		−6.8%
2020	272		41.7%
U.S. Decennial Census; 2013 Estimate

=== 2020 census ===
Epes town, Alabama – Racial and ethnic composition Note: the US Census treats Hispanic/Latino as an ethnic category. This table excludes Latinos from the racial categories and assigns them to a separate category. Hispanics/Latinos may be of any race.
Race / Ethnicity (NH = Non-Hispanic)	Pop 2010	Pop 2020	% 2010	% 2020
White alone (NH)	17	10	8.85%	3.68%
Black or African American alone (NH)	175	257	91.15%	94.49%
Native American or Alaska Native alone (NH)	0	0	0.00%	0.00%
Asian alone (NH)	0	0	0.00%	0.00%
Pacific Islander alone (NH)	0	0	0.00%	0.00%
Some Other Race alone (NH)	0	1	0.00%	0.37%
Mixed Race/Multi-Racial (NH)	0	1	0.00%	0.37%
Hispanic or Latino (any race)	0	3	0.00%	1.10%
Total	192	272	100.00%	100.00%

As of the 2010 United States census, there were 192 people living in the town. The racial makeup of the town was 91.1% Black and 8.9% White.

As of the census of 2000, there were 206 people, 80 households, and 46 families living in the town. The population density was 107.1 inhabitants per square mile (41.4/km^{2}). There were 105 housing units at an average density of 54.6 per square mile (21.1/km^{2}). The racial makeup of the town was 15.53% White, 83.98% Black or African American and 0.49% Native American.

There were 80 households, out of which 30.0% had children under the age of 18 living with them, 37.5% were married couples living together, 15.0% had a female householder with no husband present, and 42.5% were non-families. 38.8% of all households were made up of individuals, and 11.3% had someone living alone who was 65 years of age or older. The average household size was 2.58 and the average family size was 3.65.

In the town, the population was spread out, with 31.1% under the age of 18, 4.4% from 18 to 24, 26.2% from 25 to 44, 24.8% from 45 to 64, and 13.6% who were 65 years of age or older. The median age was 38 years. For every 100 females, there were 104.0 males. For every 100 females age 18 and over, there were 102.9 males.

The median income for a household in the town was $25,625, and the median income for a family was $38,125. Males had a median income of $25,833 versus $14,583 for females. The per capita income for the town was $10,404. About 22.2% of families and 25.0% of the population were below the poverty line, including 31.6% of those under the age of eighteen and 15.0% of those 65 or over.

== Notable people ==
- Carol Forman, actress
- Willie James Hodges, murderer and suspected serial killer
- Bill Oliver, former football player and coach
