= Willacy County Regional Detention Center =

Men's prison in Raymondville, Texas

Coordinates: 26°28′15″N 97°45′32″W

- Interactive map of Willacy County Regional Detention Center
- Location: 1371 Industrial Drive Raymondville, Texas
- Status: open
- Capacity: 586
- Opened: 2003

The Willacy County Regional Detention Center aka the Willacy Detention Center is a prison for men located in Raymondville, Willacy County, Texas, formerly operated by Management and Training Corporation (MTC) under contract with the U.S. Marshal Service.

The prison was originally built in 2003 and has an official capacity of 586 federal detainees.

The federal contract with MTC ended in April 2022 due to Executive Order 14006, leading to a temporary closure of the facility. The country considered operating the facility by itself, which would have been permitted under federal restrictions. In October 2022, it was announced that neighboring Hidalgo County would rent the facility in a 50-year agreement, due to overcrowding issues in Hidalgo County jail.

Hidalgo County assumed an annual rental cost of $3 million and contracted LaSalle Corrections to run the facility for $13.9 million per year, a number set to increase annually over the eight-year contract. LaSalle was paid for operations in 2023, even though the facility was empty. Transfers of Hidalgo County inmates did not begin until July 26, 2024.

This facility is adjacent to two other private prison sites: the Willacy County Correctional Center, formerly operated by the Management and Training Corporation for the federal government and closed in 2015, and the Willacy County State Jail, operated by the Corrections Corporation of America through August 2017, under contract with the state of Texas, and subsequently by the LaSalle Corrections corporation.
