= Raymondville, Texas =

City in and county seat of Willacy County, Texas, United States

- City
- City of Raymondville
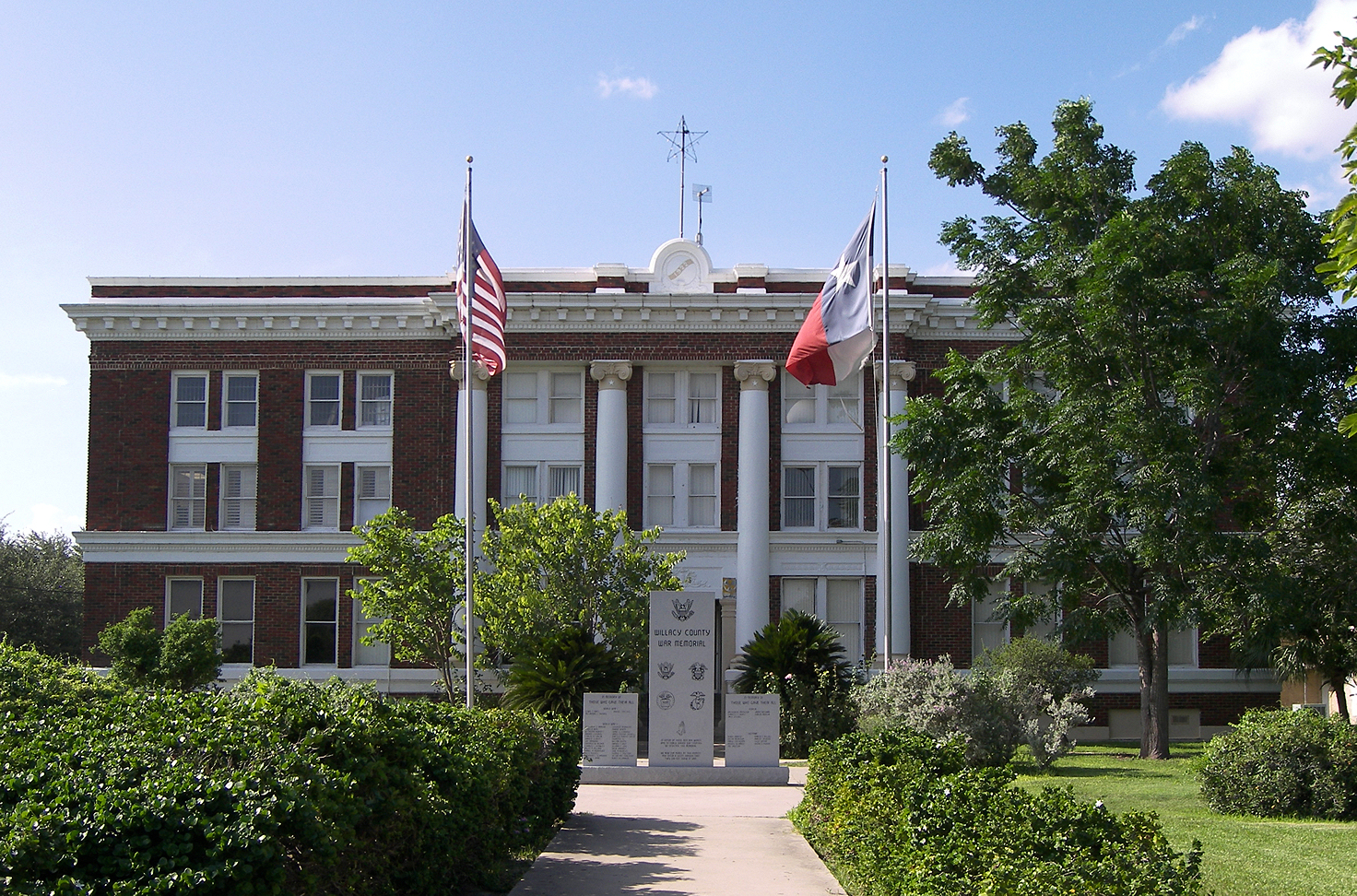
- Willacy Court House

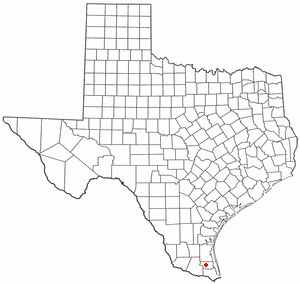
- Location of Raymondville, Texas

- Coordinates: 26°28′53″N 97°46′59″W
- Country: United States
- State: Texas
- County: Willacy

Area
  - Total: 4.12 sq mi (10.68 km^{2})
  - Land: 4.12 sq mi (10.66 km^{2})
  - Water: 0.012 sq mi (0.03 km^{2})
- Elevation: 30 ft (9 m)

Population (2020)
  - Total: 10,236
  - Density: 2,487/sq mi (960.2/km^{2})
- Time zone: UTC-6 (Central (CST))
  - Summer (DST): UTC-5 (CDT)
- ZIP codes: 78580, 78598
- Area code: 956
- FIPS code: 48-60836
- GNIS feature ID: 1377181
- Website: raymondvilletx.us

Raymondville is a city in and the county seat of Willacy County, Texas, United States. The population was 10,236 at the 2020 census. Willacy County is also the Raymondville micropolitan area.

Raymondville was formed in 1904 by Edward Burleson Raymond, a foreman of the El Sauz Ranch portion of the King Ranch and owner of the Las Majadas Ranch.

== Geography ==
Raymondville is located at 26°28′53″N 97°46′59″W (26.481464, –97.783013) and is known as the "Gateway to the Rio Grande Valley." According to the United States Census Bureau, the city has a total area of 3.8 square miles (9.8 km^{2}), all land.

Soils are mostly clay or sandy clay loams which are well drained or moderately well drained. Some fine sandy loams underlie the eastern part of town. These have near neutral pH. Other parts of town have moderately alkaline, somewhat saline soils. Around the southern edge of town is an area of strong salinity, which imposes limitations on farmers and gardeners.

=== Climate ===
The climate in this area is characterized by hot, humid summers and generally mild to cool winters. According to the Köppen climate classification, Raymondville has a humid subtropical climate, Cfa on climate maps. The all-time record high of 109 °F (43 °C) occurred on June 6 1916, while the all-time record low of 14 °F (-10 °C) occurred on January 12 and 13, 1962. The average date of first frost is December 15, while the average date of last frost is January 23.

Climate data for Raymondville, Texas (1991–2020 normals, extremes 1913–present)
Month	Jan	Feb	Mar	Apr	May	Jun	Jul	Aug	Sep	Oct	Nov	Dec	Year
Record high °F (°C)	92 (33)	99 (37)	105 (41)	106 (41)	107 (42)	109 (43)	107 (42)	107 (42)	107 (42)	102 (39)	99 (37)	94 (34)	109 (43)
Mean maximum °F (°C)	85.5 (29.7)	90.0 (32.2)	93.7 (34.3)	96.7 (35.9)	97.3 (36.3)	100.1 (37.8)	101.2 (38.4)	102.3 (39.1)	99.6 (37.6)	95.6 (35.3)	91.0 (32.8)	85.7 (29.8)	103.7 (39.8)
Mean daily maximum °F (°C)	71.3 (21.8)	76.0 (24.4)	80.9 (27.2)	86.7 (30.4)	90.8 (32.7)	95.3 (35.2)	96.9 (36.1)	98.3 (36.8)	93.1 (33.9)	88.2 (31.2)	79.8 (26.6)	72.8 (22.7)	85.8 (29.9)
Daily mean °F (°C)	59.7 (15.4)	64.0 (17.8)	69.3 (20.7)	75.1 (23.9)	80.3 (26.8)	84.6 (29.2)	85.9 (29.9)	86.6 (30.3)	82.4 (28.0)	76.3 (24.6)	67.9 (19.9)	61.2 (16.2)	74.4 (23.6)
Mean daily minimum °F (°C)	48.1 (8.9)	51.9 (11.1)	57.8 (14.3)	63.4 (17.4)	69.8 (21.0)	74.0 (23.3)	74.9 (23.8)	74.9 (23.8)	71.6 (22.0)	64.4 (18.0)	56.1 (13.4)	49.6 (9.8)	63.0 (17.2)
Mean minimum °F (°C)	32.9 (0.5)	35.9 (2.2)	39.7 (4.3)	47.1 (8.4)	56.6 (13.7)	68.3 (20.2)	70.0 (21.1)	70.0 (21.1)	61.7 (16.5)	47.5 (8.6)	39.1 (3.9)	33.6 (0.9)	30.3 (−0.9)
Record low °F (°C)	14 (−10)	19 (−7)	21 (−6)	33 (1)	45 (7)	56 (13)	61 (16)	60 (16)	45 (7)	33 (1)	28 (−2)	15 (−9)	14 (−10)
Average precipitation inches (mm)	1.01 (26)	1.02 (26)	1.40 (36)	1.35 (34)	3.03 (77)	2.58 (66)	2.47 (63)	2.09 (53)	5.56 (141)	2.97 (75)	0.87 (22)	1.12 (28)	25.47 (647)
Average snowfall inches (cm)	0.0 (0.0)	0.0 (0.0)	0.0 (0.0)	0.0 (0.0)	0.0 (0.0)	0.0 (0.0)	0.0 (0.0)	0.0 (0.0)	0.0 (0.0)	0.0 (0.0)	0.0 (0.0)	0.2 (0.51)	0.2 (0.51)
Average precipitation days (≥ 0.01 in)	4.7	4.0	3.6	3.3	3.8	4.6	5.0	5.4	8.2	4.6	3.9	5.0	56.1
Average snowy days (≥ 0.1 in)	0.0	0.0	0.0	0.0	0.0	0.0	0.0	0.0	0.0	0.0	0.0	0.0	0.0
Source: NOAA

== Demographics ==
Historical population
Census	Pop.	Note	%±
1930	2,050		—
1940	4,050		97.6%
1950	9,136		125.6%
1960	9,385		2.7%
1970	7,987		−14.9%
1980	9,493		18.9%
1990	8,880		−6.5%
2000	9,733		9.6%
2010	11,284		15.9%
2020	10,236		−9.3%
U.S. Decennial Census; 1850–1900 1910; 1920 1930 1940; 1950 1960 1970; 1980 1990 2000; 2010

=== 2020 census ===
As of the 2020 census, Raymondville had a population of 10,236 people, 2,506 households, and 2,151 families residing in the city.

The median age was 34.7 years; 21.5% of residents were under the age of 18 and 13.9% of residents were 65 years of age or older. For every 100 females there were 131.6 males, and for every 100 females age 18 and over there were 141.9 males age 18 and over.

99.0% of residents lived in urban areas, while 1.0% lived in rural areas.

Of the 2,506 households in Raymondville, 40.7% had children under the age of 18 living in them, 40.9% were married-couple households, 17.4% were households with a male householder and no spouse or partner present, and 34.5% were households with a female householder and no spouse or partner present. About 22.4% of all households were made up of individuals and 13.7% had someone living alone who was 65 years of age or older.

There were 2,983 housing units, of which 16.0% were vacant. The homeowner vacancy rate was 1.7% and the rental vacancy rate was 11.8%.

Racial composition as of the 2020 census
Race	Number	Percent
White	4,041	39.5%
Black or African American	431	4.2%
American Indian and Alaska Native	65	0.6%
Asian	150	1.5%
Native Hawaiian and Other Pacific Islander	0	0.0%
Some other race	2,853	27.9%
Two or more races	2,696	26.3%
Hispanic or Latino (of any race)	8,798	86.0%

Raymondville racial composition (NH = Non-Hispanic) (Note: Note: the US Census treats Hispanic/Latino as an ethnic category. This table excludes Latinos from the racial categories and assigns them to a separate category. Hispanics/Latinos can be of any race.)
Race	Number	Percentage
White (NH)	817	7.98%
Black or African American (NH)	418	4.08%
Native American or Alaska Native (NH)	15	0.15%
Asian (NH)	148	1.45%
Some Other Race (NH)	21	0.21%
Mixed/Multi-Racial (NH)	19	0.19%
Hispanic or Latino	8,798	85.95%
Total	10,236	

=== 2000 census ===
As of the census of 2000, 9,733 people, 2,514 households, and 2,016 families were residing in the city. The population density was 2,564.4 people/sq mi (988.9/km^{2}). The 2,842 housing units had an average density of 748.8/sq mi (288.8/km^{2}). The racial makeup of the city was 69.91% White, 3.91% African American, 0.59% Native American, 0.10% Asian, 23.29% from other races, and 2.20% from two or more races. Hispanics or Latinos of any race were 86.63% of the population.

Of the 2,514 households, 41.0% had children under 18 living with them, 57.6% were married couples living together, 18.8% had a female householder with no husband present, and 19.8% were not families. About 18.4% of all households were made up of individuals, and 11.8% had someone living alone who was 65 or older. The average household size was 3.45, and the average family size was 3.97.

In the city, the age distribution was 29.9% under 18, 13.1% from 18 to 24, 27.8% from 25 to 44, 17.5% from 45 to 64, and 11.7% who were 65 or older. The median age was 30 years. For every 100 females, there were 117.5 males. For every 100 females age 18 and over, there were 119.5 males.

The median income for a household in the city was $19,729, and for a family was $23,799. Males had a median income of $20,034 versus $14,502 for females. The per capita income for the city was $8,910. About 32.7% of families and 36.2% of the population were below the poverty line, including 45.0% of those under age 18 and 30.7% of those age 65 or over.

=== Religion ===
In 2010, Raymondville was 77% Catholic, 10.5% Southern Baptist, and 4% United Methodist.

== Infrastructure ==
Raymondville is the location of three private prisons, all adjacent to each other:

- Willacy County Correctional Center (26.469897°N 97.762176°W), owned and operated by the Management and Training Corporation under contract with the U.S. Immigration and Customs Enforcement, is located on the east side of Interstate 69E/U.S. Route 77. Constructed in 45 days, it opened in 2006 and closed in March 2015 after destructive riots; the center was a large "tent city" federal holding center for illegal immigrants. The El Valle Detention Facility now operates nearby as an immigration detention center and has drawn scrutiny during the Trump administration’s immigration enforcement.
- The Willacy County Regional Detention Center, or the Willacy Detention Center (26.470818°N 97.758837°W) opened in 2003. It is operated by Management and Training Corporation housing federal prisoners for the U.S. Marshal Service.
- The Willacy County State Jail (26.467076°N 97.767420°W), operated by the Corrections Corporation of America under contract with the Texas Department of Criminal Justice, is a medium-security facility with a capacity of 1069. CCA has managed this facility since 2004. This facility was opened by Wackenhut, now GEO Group, in 1996. On April 26, 2001, inmate Gregorio De La Rosa, Jr., was beaten to death by other prisoners. This incident caused a $42.5 million civil settlement against Wackenhut.

The United States Postal Service operates the Raymondville Post Office.

The Raymondville Independent School District serves the city.

The Reber Memorial Library is located in Raymondville.

The Raymondville Chronicle and Willacy County News, a weekly newspaper, is published in Raymondville.

== Notable people ==
- Clinton Manges (1923–2010), businessman; lived in Raymondville, married a native belle, built and owned a bowling alley
- Angela Via (born 1981), Singer; was born and raised in Raymondville

== Films ==
Raymondville's history was the subject of the film, Valley of Tears. The movie visits the Mexican-American community that had worked the onion fields of rural South Texas in three different eras, observing how the seeds of change planted 20 years ago seem ready to bear fruit today. Politicians and officials interviewed in the film include Larry Spence, former District Attorney Juan Angel Guerra, Paul Whitworth, Wetegrove families, Dr. Allan Spence, and school-board and city-council members.

== See also ==
- List of municipalities in Texas
