= Gadsden Correctional Facility =

Private state prison for women in Florida, US

Coordinates: 30°35′23″N 84°39′22″W

- Interactive map of Gadsden Correctional Facility
- Location: 6044 Greensboro Hwy Quincy, Florida
- Status: open
- Security class: medium, minimum, community
- Capacity: 1544
- Opened: 1995
- Managed by: Management and Training Corporation

The Gadsden Correctional Facility is a private state prison for women located in Quincy, Gadsden County, Florida, operated by Management and Training Corporation (MTC) under contract with the Florida Department of Corrections. This facility was opened in 1995 and has a maximum capacity of 1544 prisoners.

As of 2017, the prison houses 1,530 prisoners.

In the mid-2010s C-Dorm had issues with its plumbing and no heat. This meant water for prisoners was rationed and there was no hot water. After three inspections occurred, David Richardson, a Florida congressperson, asked MTC to install a new water heater for the facility. It was installed in February 2017 shortly before the fourth inspection.

== Notable Inmates ==
Jennifer Fichter
