= Arizona State Prison – Marana =

Prison in Marana, Arizona

Coordinates: 32°25′04″N 111°14′29″W

- Interactive map of Arizona State Prison – Marana
- Location: Marana, Arizona
- Status: Closed
- Capacity: 775
- Opened: 1994; 32 years ago
- Closed: 2023; 3 years ago
- Managed by: Management and Training Corporation

Arizona State Prison–Marana, also known as Marana Community Correctional Treatment Facility (MCCTF), is a prison in Marana, Pima County, Arizona.

== History ==
The prison was opened in 1994 in Marana, Arizona and was the first private prison in Arizona. It was operated by Management and Training Corporation (MTC). In June 2004, the prison's chief of security and a sergeant resigned over allegations that prisoners were forced to do pushups as a form of discipline.

In 2013, the state of Arizona purchased the facility; it continued to be operated by MTC. A 2023 Prison Rape Elimination Act audit on the facility noted at least three cases of sexual assault. The prison was closed in December 2023, with governor Katie Hobbs citing high costs and declining prison populations. At the time of closure, the prison housed around 225 inmates; the inmates were transferred to other prisons in Arizona.

Arizona state senator John Kavanagh sponsored a bill to lease the facility for $1 a year to the federal government to house people accused of immigration violations; the bill was rejected 48-10 in May 2025. In May 2025, the prison was sold to MTC for $15 million. In October 2025, MTC submitted plans to convert the building into an ICE detainment facility. The plans were condemned by Arizona senators Mark Kelly and Ruben Gallego. On September 29, 2026, MTC signed a contract with ICE to reopen the facility as an immigrant detainment center.

== Description ==
The prison was opened in 1994 in Marana, Arizona and was the first private prison in Arizona. Prisoners at the facility were used as labor around Marana; inmates were paid around 15¢ per hour. The prison was originally built for a capacity of 513 beds. By 2026, inmate capacity was increased to 775. The Department of Homeland Security plans to increase capacity to 1,300 and install a second perimeter fence around the facility.

A 2010 Arizona Department of Corrections report noted that the facility's kitchen sanitation was "substandard" and facility's cooling system did not work properly, leading to high temperatures.

== See also ==
- List of Arizona state prisons
