= Debra Lafave =

American former teacher

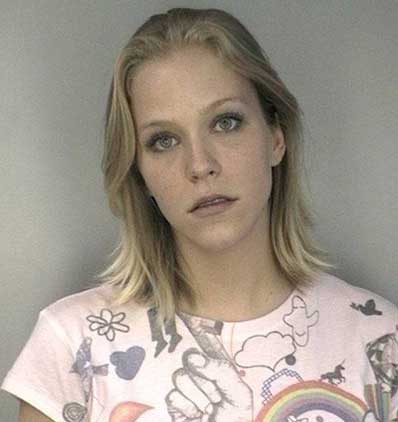
- Lafave's 2007 mugshot
- Born: Debra Beasley; August 28, 1980 (age 46); Riverview, Florida, U.S.
- Other name: Debra Jean Williams (current married name)
- Education: University of South Florida
- Occupation: Former teacher
- Spouse: Kristian Owen Lafave (m. 2003–2005)
- Children: 3
- Status: Released
- Criminal charge: Lewd and lascivious battery
- Penalty: Three years house arrest, seven years probation (probation terminated September 22, 2011; reinstated by appellate court August 15, 2012; terminated after Florida Supreme Court ruling October 2014)

Debra Jean Williams (née Beasley; born August 28, 1980), better known by her former married name of Debra Lafave, is an American sex offender and former teacher at Angelo L. Greco Middle School in Temple Terrace, Florida. In 2005, she pleaded guilty to lewd or lascivious battery against a teenager stemming from a sexual encounter with a male student referred to as "M.M." in police reports and "Jack" in her estranged then-husband's book Gorgeous Disaster: The Tragic Story of Debra LaFave, in the summer of 2004 when she was 23 and "M.M." was 14. Lafave's plea bargain included no prison time, opting for three years of house arrest due to safety concerns, seven years of probation, and lifetime registration as a sex offender.

== Early life and education ==
Lafave attended East Bay High School until 1996. From 1995 to 1996, Lafave dated Nick Carter. She also had a relationship with classmate Casie Diana Martinez; which allegedly also became sexual. As a result of that relationship, Lafave's parents withdrew her from East Bay and transferred her to Bloomingdale High School which she would graduate class of 1998. Around that time, she took a gig as a pin-up model for the magazine Makes & Models (M&M). Later on when news of the sex scandal made the headlines, her leaked modeling photos from that time period contributed to the sensationalism of the story.

She attended the University of South Florida and graduated with a degree in English. In the midst of her junior year in college, her then-five-months-pregnant 24-year-old older sister Angela "Angie" Beasley was killed in April 2001 by drunk driver Army Captain Joseph Piotrowski when he crashed his jeep into older-sister Beasley's 1998 Nissan. Piotrowski was convicted in August 2001 under court-martial and sentenced to 13 years in prison. He received a concurrent 30-year sentence in state court. In interviews, Lafave (who said she had a close relationship with her sister) would describe that event as having been particularly traumatic for her and said it led her to have several bouts of depressive moods.

After college graduation in 2002, she was hired as an English teacher at Greco Middle School in Temple Terrace, Florida. On July 19, 2003, following her first year of teaching, she married banker Owen Lafave.

== Crime, first arrest and trial ==
Lafave, then 23, was charged with statutory rape for having sex with a 14-year-old male student, referred to in the press by the initials "M.M.", from the middle school she was teaching in. She engaged in oral sex as well as vaginal intercourse with "M.M." without using a condom on four different occasions between June 3rd to June 17th of 2004: Once in the bedroom of her Riverview town house condominium, once in her portable classroom, and multiple times in the back seat of her car, a 4x4 silver 2002 model Isuzu Rodeo Sport.

Despite having a reputation among classmates and teachers as being a mischievous, funny, and arrogant student who often pushed boundaries, in reality (known only to those close to him, like his cousin) "M.M." was still a virgin who had never been sexually intimate prior to his experience with Lafave. Although "M.M." was not Lafave's student, he knew of Lafave due to other students finding her attractive.

In April 2004, Lafave first became acquainted with "M.M." while watching tag football game a few of her students were participating in which "M.M." and his friend John Wood also happened to be fellow participants. Allegedly, that day "M.M." and John Wood took the initiative to approach Lafave and according to witnesses, Lafave loved the attention that "M.M." gave her. As Lafave continued visiting "M.M." and his friends at their games, she once bought them candy and invited them to regularly hang out in her portable. Lafave began dressing more provocatively such as wearing short skirts and low-cut or tight shirts. She also complained to her friends and colleagues of sexual dissatisfaction from her husband as well as issues with insecurity exacerbated by the pressures of her married life brought on by the lifestyle of being married to her husband Owen who worked as a banker at the time.

In May 2004, during the final week of school, when the graduating class (including "M.M.") took a trip to SeaWorld Orlando on grad night, which Lafave chaperoned, "M.M." and Lafave got a chance to become acquainted. They developed a close relationship even though Lafave's husband Owen was on the trip. That week, Lafave went out of her way to put "M.M." in detention to spend time with him in the detention room, even sometimes inviting his friends. Other times she asked "M.M." to stay after school to be with her. Around that time, the two allegedly first kissed. On one occasion that Lafave asked "M.M." (and his friends) to clean her portable classroom, "M.M." asked Lafave to flash her breast at him. Allegedly, Lafave only pulled up her shirt to reveal a tiny bit of the bottom of her bra, but when "M.M."'s friends left and Lafave was alone with the boy, "M.M." and Lafave allegedly kissed. On the last day of school, a student hosted a party inviting all other classmates including "M.M.". Lafave came with "M.M." to the party and was the only teacher present. When curiosity arose about Lafave's presence, "M.M." referred to Lafave as his "girlfriend". By the end of the party, after driving the other students home, Lafave gave "M.M." her number and allegedly was already discussing plans to have sex with him. During the start of the summer holidays leading up to the first sexual encounter, Lafave and "M.M." spoke via phone often and Lafave regularly drove him to summer activities and kissed him during those car rides. Around that time, Lafave opened up to "M.M." that she was thinking about him a lot and had feelings for him which "made her smile" and which she could not get rid of. Allegedly in the police reports, Lafave told "M.M." that she was having marital issues and therefore was "turned on by the fact that having sexual relations with him was not allowed".

At one point in the sexual relationship, Lafave gave "M.M." a pewter key pendant with a butterfly and the word "Hope." She told "M.M." that she had an identical pendant and wanted him to have one as a symbol of the bond of their relationship.

In one of their outings together (shortly after their penultimate sexual encounter) Lafave was captured on Best Buy's security camera near Paddock Mall wearing a light yellow halter sundress and platform sandals along with "M.M." together with his cousin (who took the role as their driver).

Toward what became the end of their sexual relationship, Lafave mentioned quitting her job at Greco to get a job at the high school "M.M." would soon transfer to, and even talked about getting married and going public about their relationship once "M.M." turned 18, but "M.M." by that point allegedly told Lafave that he needed a break.

=== Busted ===
Lafave's sexual relationship with "M.M." was exposed when the two visited "M.M."'s cousin in Ocala and had a final sexual encounter. His aunt saw the pair in a parking lot and was alarmed at seeing "M.M." in the company of a provocatively dressed woman which according to police reports, was a purple and pink capri pants with matching color halter top which tied to the neck. She asked her son ("M.M."'s cousin) about the situation; he told his mom that Lafave was the sister of a mutual friend of him and "M.M." from the University of Florida and that they were buying Father's Day presents. Unconvinced, the aunt alerted "M.M."'s mother. Under intense questioning from his mother, "M.M." admitted that the woman was Lafave.

Officers in Temple Terrace recorded conversations between Lafave and "M.M." to get a recorded verbal statement from Lafave confirming she had unprotected sex with "M.M."; commenting to “M.M.” that “I don’t know why you are worried”, that “M.M.” is “…being weird” or “…think (Lafave) weird” to bring up & suggest using a condom, & that getting her pregnant “…should be the least of your worries”.

=== Arrest ===
With the statement secured, the officers had "M.M." arrange a meeting with Lafave at his house on the pretense that his mom was out for the entire day, then arrested her when she arrived. When Lafave pulled up to the driveway, police surrounded her vehicle and arrested her. According to M.M.'s mother who recounted the arrest, Lafave was wearing a pink tank top, shorts, and no makeup at the time of arrest and surprised M.M.'s mother by how young Lafave was considering she was expecting a stereotypical teacher in her 40s.

=== Legal proceedings ===
Two separate sets of charges were filed, because the alleged incidents occurred in both Riverview, in Hillsborough County, and Ocala, in Marion County. A trial date was set after the prosecution and defense could not agree on a plea bargain that involved prison time. Lafave faced a sentence of 5 to 15 years for each of the two counts of which she was accused.

On December 3, to buttress M.M.'s account, police publicly released the very surveillance stills (from the very moments after the penultimate sexual encounter) of Lafave with M.M. and his cousin browsing at the Best Buy with the two boys nearby in her short halterneck yellow sundress.

Shortly before the trial was to begin, "M.M."'s mother learned that Court TV intended to cover it but would not agree to keep her son's identity private. The pretrial publicity was already taking a noticeable toll on "M.M."; he had a difficult time talking to an assistant prosecutor from Marion County. "M.M."'s cousin also indicated that he was not willing to testify under the circumstances. Eventually, "M.M."'s family decided that sending Lafave to prison was not worth the emotional trauma of the proceedings. They were especially concerned they would have to repeat the process two years later, since there would be separate trials in Tampa and Ocala. They asked the prosecutors to offer Lafave a deal that would avoid a trial. The defense was willing to agree to a plea deal, provided that Lafave would serve no jail time. As part of the deal, Lafave pleaded guilty and was sentenced to three years of community control (house arrest) and seven years of sex offender probation. Prosecutors defended the deal, saying that sex offender probation in Florida is quite difficult to complete; Lafave could have gone to jail if she violated any of the probation terms.

Lafave's plea deal effectively ended her teaching career. As part of her plea deal, Lafave was required to surrender her teaching license and was banned from ever teaching in Florida again. No state will grant a teaching license to anyone convicted of sexual misconduct or related offenses. Under the terms of her probation, she had to be home by 10 p.m. every day, could not leave Hillsborough County without a judge's permission, and could not be around minors. She also had to register as a sex offender. There was widespread skepticism as to whether a man guilty of lewd or lascivious battery would have received equally mild punishment.

On December 8, 2005, Marion County Circuit Judge Hale Stancil rejected the plea deal, claiming that any agreement not requiring prison time "would undermine the credibility of this court, and the criminal justice system as a whole, and would erode public confidence in our schools." He set a trial date for April 10, 2006. The Marion County state's attorney subsequently dropped the charges. In a statement, the prosecutors cited an assessment by psychologist Martin Lazoritz that found "M.M." would be so severely traumatized by a trial that it may take eight years for him to recover.

=== Physical appearance ===
The issue of Lafave's attractive physical appearance became a point of argument in court. Lafave's lawyer John Fitzgibbons stated, "To place Debbie into a Florida state women's penitentiary, to place an attractive young woman in that kind of hellhole, is like putting a piece of raw meat in with the lions." Suzanne Goldenberg of The Guardian asserted that Lafave avoided jail time due to a faulty belief among Americans that she was "too pretty for prison". Ariel Levy, writing in New York, called Fitzgibbons's statement "notorious", and Lafave's ex-husband criticized it. Commentators have claimed that the attention given to this particular case arose from Lafave's physical appearance. Provocative modeling photographs of Lafave have circulated on the Internet since she first gained notoriety.

The Temple Terrace Police Department came under scrutiny for taking graphic nude photos of Lafave while she was in stirrups in a jail cell. The lead detective who requested the nude photos of her was arrested before the trial in an unrelated prostitution sting.

According to the supplementary police report based on M.M.’s account at the time, Lafave was reported to have an oriental writing of “Chinese or Japanese” allegedly of her late sister’s name tattooed on her lower back with twin blue/purple butterflies next to the writing. The report also stated that Lafave had an oval-shaped-nickel-sized birthmark with rough edges; light brown in color and easily to be mistaken as freckles, located next to her medial malleolus; anterior to the ankle. There was reportedly prominent bikini tan lines on her body, in particular a string bikini tan on both sides of her hips, a “V” tan on her crotch followed with a completely covered buttocks tan on her rear end. Lafave’s pubic hair was reported to be light brown in color but cleanly shaven on both sides of her crotch area and fairly clean shaven on the vulva; possibly a result of Brazilian waxing, forming a thin rectangular shape. M.M. also recounted that Lafave also sported bellybutton rings from various butterfly styles as well as a pink heart design.

== Second arrest and violation of probation ==
Lafave was arrested on December 4, 2007, for violating her probation by speaking with a 17-year-old restaurant co-worker. The court ruled, however, that the violation was neither willful nor substantial, and it did not revoke her probation.

== Aftermath ==
Lafave later attributed her criminal actions to bipolar disorder, which is associated with intense and irregular mood swings, and with hypersexuality and poor judgment during manic episodes. She was also treated for bipolar disorder after allegedly being raped at age 13 by a classmate.

In July 2008, within the terms of her plea deal, Lafave petitioned to convert the remainder of her house arrest to probation, having satisfied other terms such as sex offender therapy and community service. Her petition was granted and her house arrest ended four months early. On October 29, 2009, Lafave was cleared to have unsupervised contact with some children. On September 22, 2011, Lafave moved to end her probation four years early, based upon having completed all other obligations. Her petition was granted and her probation ended that day. "M.M."'s family stated that they would appeal the decision. The early termination of probation was reversed by the 2nd District Court of Appeals on August 15, 2012.

Lafave asked the Florida Supreme Court to reinstate her release from probation. On January 24, 2013, Lafave was ordered to continue her probation while the Florida Supreme Court waited to hear the case. In October 2014, the Florida Supreme Court ruled in favor of Lafave.

== In popular culture ==
The novel Tampa, by Alissa Nutting, was inspired by the case of Debra Lafave.

== See also ==
- Hebephilia
- Jennifer Fichter
- Mary Kay Letourneau
- Miss Teacher Bangs a Boy
- Pamela Joan Rogers
- Sexual harassment in education
- Statutory rape#Female-male statutory rape
