= Arizona State Prison – Kingman =

Prison facility operated for the Arizona Department of Corrections

Coordinates: 35.03°N 114.18°W

Arizona State Prison Complex – Kingman
- Interactive map of Arizona State Prison Complex – Kingman
- Location: Mohave County, Arizona
- Status: open
- Security class: mixed
- Capacity: 3,508
- Opened: 2004
- Managed by: GEO Group

Arizona State Prison – Kingman is a privately run minimum/medium-security prison designed to hold 3500 prisoners. It is located in unincorporated Mohave County, Arizona, in Golden Valley. When the idea of the prison was being sold to the residents of Golden Valley it was promised that it would be a prison only for Dui offenders. It was operated by the Management and Training Corporation under contract to the Arizona Department of Corrections until August 2015. MTC had been criticized for allowing the homicidal escape of three violent prisoners in 2010. The state began seeking an alternate provider after it found MTC failed to control riots on July 1, 2 and 4, at Kingman, in July 2015.

Because of damage to the prison, the state had to transfer more than 1,000 inmates to other facilities. As a result of the accompanying revenue loss, the Mohave County Industrial Development Authority's bond rating was lowered by Standard and Poors to BBB+. In August 2015 the state reissued the contract for managing prisons to the GEO Group of Boca Raton, Florida. It was forced out of a contract in Mississippi in 2012 as part of settlement of a federal class action suit for its operation of Walnut Grove Youth Correctional Facility. In February 2017 the Mississippi State Attorney named GEO Group and 14 other contractors in a civil suit for damages related to corruption and bribery of state officials in the prison system, as revealed in federal indictments and convictions.

== Background of prison ==
The Kingman prison was constructed for the state on land in Mohave County that had been speculatively purchased before 2000 by the Dominion Correctional Services of Edmund, Oklahoma. It was initially proposed to hold 1,400 minimum security inmates convicted of drunken driving. In January 2003, new Governor Janet Napolitano delayed approval of its construction. Dominion's proposal was supported in 2002 by a committee headed by then-state District 4 Representative and House speaker, the late Jake Flake, and Mohave County Supervisor Buster Dennis Johnson.

The prison was constructed and was owned by the Mohave County Industrial Development Authority. It was operated under contract with the state to hold minimum/medium-security inmates, some of whom had been convicted of violent crimes. The state contracted with Management and Training Corporation, a for-profit prison management company based in Utah, to operate the prison. The prison's smaller, 1,400-bed, medium security unit was originally called Hualapai, but after it was designated a sex offender facility in 2015, tribal objections caused a name change to Huachucha.

== May 31, 2010 riot ==
Seven injured inmates were transported to the Kingman hospital after a race riot at the 2,000-bed, minimum-security Cerbat unit, on Memorial Day, 2010.

== 2010 escapes ==
On July 30, 2010, three inmates, two incarcerated for murders and one for attempted homicides, escaped from the facility. One was recaptured in western Colorado on August 1, after a shootout with a Garfield County deputy and city police in Rifle, Colorado. A second was recaptured by U.S. Marshals on August 9 in Meeteetse, Wyoming. The third escapee and his accomplice cousin were spotted by a U.S. Forest Service employee, then captured, also by U.S. Marshals, in east-central Arizona near Springerville on August 19, 2010, in a White Mountains campground. McCluskey, Province and Welch were indicted in the carjacking and murders in Arizona of a couple they killed while on the run. On June 3, 2014, McCluskey was sentenced to life plus 235 years, but died on March 7, 2017, at Colorado's Florence ADX supermax prison. On June 2, 2014, Province, who was doing life in Arizona, was sentenced again to life in prison, and Welch to 40 years for their parts in this crime. The latter two had pleaded guilty in a plea bargain.

== July 2015 riots ==
From July 1 to July 4, riots broke out again at Kingman, first in the minimum security, then the medium security units; the prison had "a long history of problems." Nine guards and seven inmates were injured in the violence. The state finally brought in 96 members of the Department of Correction's special tactical unit (STU) to quell the disturbances. Because large areas of the prison were severely damaged by the rioting, more than 1,000 prisoners had to be transferred to other facilities.

The dramatic reduction in the number of prisoners held at Kingman resulted in rapid revenue losses for associated services of businesses in the county. As a consequence, Standard and Poors lowered the bond rating of the Mohave County Industrial Development Authority to BBB+.

== MTC replaced by GEO Group ==
Following the riot, in August 2015 Arizona governor Doug Ducey terminated the contract with MTC after an Arizona Department of Corrections investigative report revealed the company had "a culture of disorganization, disengagement, and disregard" of DOC policies. Five competitor for-profit prison corporations indicated an interest in operating the facilities upon MTC's departure.

The state awarded the contract to GEO Group, effective December 1, 2015. GEO had contributed $2,000 to Ducey's 2014 campaign for Governor, plus $50,000 more to an Independent expenditure Superpac that exclusively supported Ducey's candidacy.

GEO Group was forced out its contract with Mississippi Department of Corrections in 2012 as part of settlement of a federal class action suit for its operations of Walnut Grove Youth Correctional Facility. In 2017 the Mississippi State Attorney announced a civil suit for damages against MTC, GEO Group and numerous other contractors in connection with a federal investigation of corruption known as Operation Mississippi Hustle. Numerous individuals had been convicted and sentenced in federal court in this case by the end of 2016.
