= Pamela Joan Rogers =

American former teacher and sex offender

- Born: July 1, 1977 (age 49); Tennessee, U.S.
- Education: Tennessee Technological University; Cumberland University
- Occupation: Former teacher
- Spouse: Christopher Turner (2003–2005; divorced)
- Criminal charges: Statutory rape, Sexual battery, Solicitation of sexual exploitation of a minor, Introduction of contraband into a penal facility
- Penalty: Imprisoned: 2005, 2006–2012, 2015–2016

Pamela Joan Rogers (born July 1, 1977), better known under her former married name Pamela Rogers Turner, is an American sex offender and a former elementary school physical education teacher and coach who taught in McMinnville, Tennessee. She was convicted of four counts of sexual battery in 2005 and two counts of solicitation of sexual exploitation of a minor in 2006 stemming from a three-month relationship with a 13-year-old boy who was her student at Centertown Elementary School. Her case made headlines and was covered by major news networks for being a notorious teacher who had an unlawful sexual relationship with one of her students. After getting released in 2012, she was taken into custody in 2015 for allegedly conspiring to smuggle contraband cell phones into a state prison and sentenced to eight years in prison; her case brought headlines and national attention to the practice of cellphone smuggling in prison.

== Early life ==
Born on July 1, 1977, Rogers attended Clarkrange High School where she was a part of the Clarkrange basketball team, Lady Buffalos, which gained some local success during her time on the team with her dad, Lamar Rogers, being the head coach of the team. When she graduated in 1995, for her senior year prom she was picked as prom queen. She subsequently attended Tennessee Technological University and Cumberland University, playing basketball for both. Also around that time, she was also featured as "Miss Nitro" WCW Monday Nitro event and around 2002, did some bikini modelling for various gigs including newspaper advertisement for Harley-Davidson for a local motorcycle shop.

She married high school basketball coach Christopher Turner in 2003. They separated in 2004 due to marital difficulties and he filed for divorce in January 2005.

== First crime and criminal prosecution ==
On February 4, 2005, Rogers was charged with 15 counts of sexual battery by an authority figure and 13 counts of statutory rape stemming from a three-month relationship with a teenage boy who was her student in the basketball class where they engaged in vaginal intercourse, oral sex; both fellatio and cunnilingus, as well as digital penetration at his home, at her apartment, and even at the school's gym on more than 12 different occasions.

The relationship allegedly began sometime in early November 2004 when the student, who was attending Rogers' PE/Basketball class, began flirting with Rogers and making sexual suggestions. Rogers, in the midst of an estranged marriage which during the relationship with the student for a separate reason would end in divorce, allegedly enjoyed the attention and entertained the student's advances.

The point when the relationship with the student became sexual was when during a phone text message exchange with the student with the student's friend present. At one point Rogers texted to the student "I think you're cute". Mixed with excitement, hesitation, and disbelief, the student allegedly looked to his friend for advice on what to write back, before texting back "I think you're hot" and from that point onward, the relationship was sexual. The student who at the time had a girlfriend of the same age upon first meeting Rogers decided to terminate the relationship with his girlfriend to be with Rogers. At some point shortly after the relationship became sexual, while the student's friend was visiting his school with another friend of his and meeting up with Rogers, Rogers revealed to the student's friend that she and the student indeed had sex while they were in the school gym.

On August 12, 2005, Rogers pleaded no contest to four charges of sexual battery by an authority figure as part of a deal with the prosecution. She was given an eight-year suspended sentence, during which she was to serve 270 days in the Warren County jail in Tennessee followed by seven years and three months of probation. She was also ordered to surrender her teaching certificate and register as a sex offender for life because sexual battery by an authority figure is a "violent sexual offense" under the law of the state of Tennessee. The sentence prohibited her from profiting from the case through books and movies as well as barring her from granting interviews for eight years.

=== Additional offenses ===
Rogers was arrested again on April 24, 2006, on the grounds that she had sent text messages, nude photos, asked if he would too and sex videos of herself to the same boy while using her father's cellphone. She was also charged for communicating with the boy via blogs and a website. The judge ordered Rogers to remain in jail until her next court hearing. On July 14, 2006, she was sentenced to seven years in prison for violating her probation by sending explicit videos to her former victim and maintaining contact with him via online blogs. Rogers asked for mercy and apologized to her family and the teen's family, saying tearfully to the judge, "I have humiliated myself. What I did was wrong, I am willing to do anything to rehabilitate myself." She asked for local incarceration with therapy. Circuit Judge Bart Stanley denied her request saying, "You have done everything except show this court that you wanted to rehabilitate yourself." He revoked Rogers's probation and ordered her to serve the rest of a seven-year prison sentence at the Debra K. Johnson Rehabilitation Center.

Rogers received two additional years of prison time in January 2007, after she pleaded guilty to sending nude photos of herself to the boy. She was released in 2012.

== Second crime and prosecution ==
On May 28, 2015, Rogers was indicted by a grand jury for introduction of contraband into a state penal facility and arrested, having allegedly conspired with two others to smuggle cell phones into the state prison where she had previously been incarcerated. She was sentenced to eight years in prison and will be released between 2024-2027.

In 2016, Rogers was featured in the Headline News segment Twisted: Teachers Who Prey.

== See also ==
- Debra Lafave
- Statutory rape#Female on male statutory rape
- Hebephilia
- Jennifer Fichter
- Mary Kay Letourneau
- Sexual harassment in education
