= Willie James Hodges =

American murderer and suspected serial killer

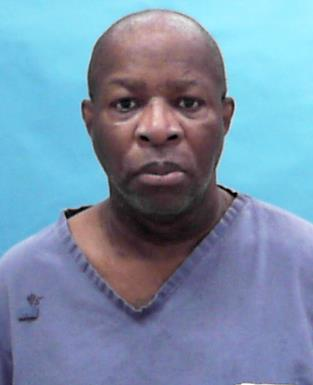
- Born: June 19, 1960; Epes, Alabama, U.S.
- Died: March 21, 2024 (aged 63); Lake City, Florida, U.S.
- Conviction: First degree murder
- Penalty: Death; commuted to life imprisonment

Details
- Victims: 1–3
- Span of crimes: 2001–2003
- Country: United States
- States: Florida (convicted); Alabama, Ohio (accused)
- Date apprehended: September 5, 2003
- Imprisoned at: Columbia Correctional Institution, Lake City, Florida

Willie James Hodges (June 19, 1960 – March 21, 2024) was an American murderer and suspected serial killer who has been convicted of a 2001 murder in Florida, to which he was linked to via DNA evidence, and was the prime suspect in two additional murders in Alabama and Ohio, but was never charged. Originally sentenced to death for the Florida conviction, the sentence was later overturned following Hurst v. Florida and he was subsequently resentenced to life imprisonment.

== Murders ==
Hodges' first suspected murder is that of 66-year-old Winnie Johnson, who was shot to death during a burglary of her home in Sumter County, Alabama on November 26, 2001.

On December 19, Hodges broke into a home in Pensacola, Florida, occupied by 58-year-old Patricia Belanger. After encountering her, he proceeded to beat her with a claw hammer on the head and stab her once in the neck with a steak knife, which immediately killed her. Upon ransacking the house, Hodges left through the window, but at that time, two relatives who had come to pick up Belanger for a holiday trip to Idaho Falls, Idaho came to the house and discovered her body. While they managed to get a good look at him and call the police, who attempted to track him down using K-9 units and a helicopter, Hodges managed to evade arrest. The killing shocked and frightened Belanger's neighbors and the surrounding community, as it correlated to a series of violent crimes that had recently taken place in Pensacola. The day after the murder, a facial composite was released to the public with a description of Belanger's suspected killer and the clothes he was wearing, but this did not lead to an arrest.

The final murder linked to Hodges took place on March 19, 2003, when 81-year-old Laverne Jansen was raped and beaten to death at her apartment in Cincinnati, Ohio. It was speculated that she had been followed home after purchasing a lottery ticket at the Glenway Pony Keg, whereupon her killer knocked on the door and forced his way inside once the door was opened. This interaction was secretly observed by a neighbor of Jansen who described what she was seeing through a peephole, but a 16-minute delay to arrive at the scene on the officers' side resulted in the suspect escaping. Ten days later, Cincinnati Police Department announced that they were searching for an unidentified person of interest in the case who was last seen shopping at the Glenway Pony Keg, but this did not lead to an arrest. The responding officers would later receive counseling for their handling of the case.

== Arrest, trial, and imprisonment ==
On September 5, Hodges was arrested for two attempted burglaries in Pensacola, for which he was lodged in jail and remanded to await trial. As a previously convicted felon, he was ordered to provide a fingerprint and DNA sample to the authorities, which was entered into CODIS. In the meantime, investigators who were assigned to Pensacola's cold case unit took notice of a photograph found at the Belanger homicide, identifying the individual in it as Vonkish Golden, Hodges' cousin, who was currently imprisoned. Through an interview with him, they learned that Hodges had stayed with his family at the time of the murder and that he had helped a relative - a next-door neighbor of Belanger - to fix his truck. After obtaining his fingerprints, they were found to be a perfect match to the crime scene, and after browsing through Hodges' personal items, investigators found a blood-stained receipt that matched a bloodied sock found inside Belanger's house. Finally, his DNA was matched to the Belanger crime scene, and Hodges was subsequently charged with her murder as well. Hodges proclaimed his innocence, claiming that he had gone inside Belanger's home in order to close her windows, as he believed that she had already left but had forgotten to close them.

The following year, investigators from Alabama and Ohio charged Hodges with the two murders in their respective jurisdictions, citing similarities to the Belanger case. However, it was decided that Hodges should first be tried in Florida, where prosecutors would seek the death penalty and had managed to convince the judge that despite his low IQ, the defendant knew right from wrong and was thus sane to stand trial. His trial began in February 2008.

Due to the overwhelming amount of evidence against him, Hodges was swiftly found guilty by a jury verdict. He was subsequently sentenced to death in February 2009.

=== Resentencing ===
In March 2017, in the aftermath of Hurst v. Florida, Hodges applied to have his sentence commuted to life imprisonment citing ineffective counsel and a non-unanimous decision of 10-2 for his death sentence. The sentence was later commuted to life imprisonment, with Hodges remaining incarcerated at the Columbia Correctional Institution in Lake City until his death on March 21, 2024. He was never charged with the other murders in Alabama and Ohio.

== See also ==
- Capital punishment in Florida
