= Management and Training Corporation =

American contractor corporation

- Type: Private
- Industry: For-profit prison and skills training
- Founder: Robert Marquardt
- Headquarters: 500 N. Marketplace Drive #100, Centerville, Utah
- Area served: United States, Puerto Rico, Egypt, Great Britain
- Divisions: Education & Training, Corrections, MTC Medical, and Economic & Social Development.
- Website: mtctrains.com

Management & Training Corporation or MTC is a contractor that manages private prisons and United States Job Corps centers, based in Centerville, Utah. MTC's core businesses are corrections, education and training, MTC medical, and economic & social development. MTC operates 21 correctional facilities in eight states. MTC also operates or partners in operating 22 of the 119 Job Corps centers across the country. They also operate in Great Britain, under the name MTCNovo.

== Education and training ==
MTC contracts with the U.S. Department of Labor in operating or partnering in operating Job Corps centers in Washington, Oregon, Nevada, Minnesota, Idaho, California, Utah, Kansas, Iowa, Illinois, Hawaii, Texas, Kentucky, Ohio, Pennsylvania, Delaware, District of Columbia, Georgia, Florida, and Mississippi.

== Corrections and Immigrant Detention ==
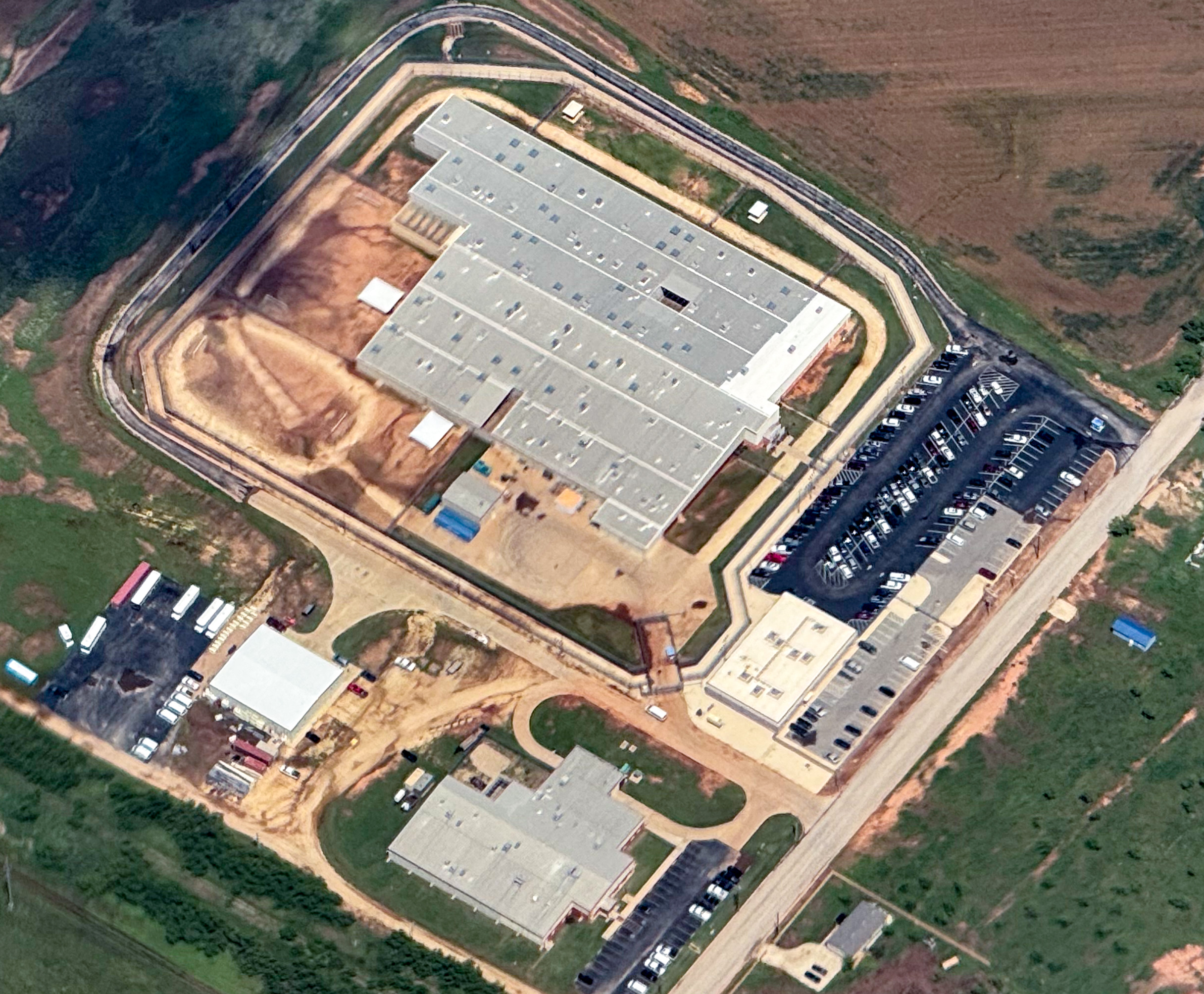
Bluebonnet Detention Center, an Immigration and Customs Enforcement facility in Anson, Texas, run by MTC

MTC is the third-largest private prison operator in the U.S. with the capacity to detain more than 31,000 people. Twelve MTC correctional facilities have earned American Correctional Association accreditation, meaning the facilities exceed national standards and implement state-of-the-art safety and security policies and procedures. Ten MTC correctional facilities exceed Correctional Education Association (CEA) standards for educational programming. Various MTC facilities are also accredited by the Licensed Substance Abuse Treatment Facility organization, the National Commission on Correctional Health Care, and The Joint Commission.

On August 18, 2016, Deputy U.S. Attorney General Sally Yates announced that the Justice Department intended to end its contracts with for-profit prison operators, because it concluded "...the facilities are both less safe and less effective at providing correctional services..." than the Federal Bureau of Prisons. In response, MTC's spokesperson, Issa Arnita, said, it was "disappointed" to learn about the DOJ's decision. "If the DOJ's decision to end the use of contract prisons were based solely on declining inmate populations, there may be some justification, but to base this decision on cost, safety and security, and programming is wrong."

Yates said in a memorandum,

...[for-profit] prisons served an important role during a difficult period, but time has shown that they compare poorly to our own Bureau facilities. They simply do not provide the same level of correctional services, programs, and resources; they do not save substantially on costs; and as noted in a recent report by the Department's Office of Inspector General (O.I.G.), they do not maintain the same level of safety and security. The rehabilitative services that the Bureau provides, such as educational programs and job training, have proved difficult to replicate and outsource and these services are essential to reducing recidivism and improving public safety.

A Bloomberg News journalist questioned the findings, as did the National Review, For-profit prison operators, including MTC, said that the DOJ report lacked objectivity. The O.I.G.'s report noted some difficulties with its conclusions, to wit: "Moreover, we were unable to compare the overall costs of incarceration between BOP institutions and contract prisons in part because of the different nature of the inmate populations and programs offered in those facilities." "We note that we were unable to evaluate all of the factors that contributed to the underlying data, including the effect of inmate demographics and facility locations." Yates's decision was reverted in 2017 by Attorney General Jeff Sessions under the new President Donald Trump administration.

A spokesman for the Texas Department of Criminal Justice said in December 2016 that the MTC-operated South Texas Intermediate Sanction Facility would be closed and inmates will be relocated,"...in light of the declining offender population because of the success of the agency's treatment and diversion initiatives." It employed about 115 people.

== MTC Medical ==
MTC Medical provides medical and dental care to prisoners at 14 facilities:

- Marana Community Correctional Treatment Facility, Marana, Arizona (and is now being opened as an ICE facility)
- Taft Correctional Institution, Taft, California
- Otero County Processing Center, Chaparral, New Mexico
- Otero County Prison Facility, Chaparral, New Mexico
- North Central Correctional Complex, Marion, Ohio
- East Texas Treatment Facility, Henderson, Texas
- Bridgeport Pre-Parole Transfer Facility, Bridgeport, Texas
- Gadsden Correctional Facility, Quincy, FL
- Giles W. Dalby Correctional Facility, Post, Texas
- West Texas Intermediate Sanction Facility, Brownfield, Texas
- South Texas Intermediate Sanction Facility, Houston, Texas
- Willacy County Correctional Center, Raymondville, Texas
- Imperial Regional Detention Facility, Calexico, California

== Economic & social development ==
MTC created its Economic & Social Development division in 2004. MTC has provided technical assistance in multiple locations around the world. Work has included vocational assessments, small and medium-enterprise development, training for marginalized populations including women and youth, executive training, national skill set development, technical vocational education and training system design and implementation, among many others. Projects have included work in China, Haiti, Iraq, Palestine, South Sudan, Mongolia, Jordan, and Tunisia.

== Background ==
MTC was founded in 1981 by Robert L. Marquardt, (1925–2012) when Morton Thiokol decided to divest its Job Corps training division. Marquardt, who worked for Morton, and his partners, borrowed $3.5 million to purchase the spin-off.

== Reported incidents of violence, abuse and poor conditions ==
=== California ===
On October 25, 2003, a 90-minute prison race riot erupted at the low-security Eagle Mountain Community Correctional Facility in Eagle Mountain, California. Some 150 mostly Latino prisoners attacked black inmates with meat cleavers, kitchen knives, broom handles, dust pans, rocks, pipes, crutches and fire extinguishers.

The private guards retreated, while state correctional officers were called in from distant state facilities. Two inmates were stabbed to death, seven others were critically injured, and dozens more were hurt. Eight short-term inmates were ultimately charged with and convicted of murder. The facility was closed by the end of the year.

=== Texas ===
==== Willacy County ====
In November 2007, four MTC employees at the Willacy Detention Center in Raymondville, Texas were charged for using company vehicles to smuggle illegal immigrants through checkpoints. They were allegedly caught smuggling 28 illegal immigrants through the U.S. Border Patrol's Sarita checkpoint, approximately 100 miles (160 km) north of Brownsville. The immigrants were from Mexico, the Dominican Republic, Honduras, Guatemala and El Salvador.

On June 22, 2011, MTC Security Officer Edwin Rodriguez was arrested, and subsequently charged with the sexual abuse of a female detainee.

On February 21, 2015, nearly 2,000 inmates at the Willacy County Correctional Center "tent" prison rioted over issues such as poor medical care. The prison was rendered "uninhabitable" according to the Federal Bureau of Prisons, which had contracted with MTC to manage 2,800 inmates. Intervention by federal, state and local law enforcement was required to suppress the riot. The Federal Bureau of Prisons soon removed some 570 inmates. MTC informed the state that all its employees would be laid off by March 9, 2015. In March, 2015, the bonds that paid for the construction of the prison were lowered to "junk" status by Standard & Poors. At the time of the closing, the bond debt balance was about $128 million, and the annual payments due for the bond debt were about $8 million a year. Willacy County filed a federal lawsuit against MTC in December 2016 for "abysmal mismanagement" of this prison and terrible conditions. Prisoners had rioted in February 2015 (see coverage above.) The Federal Bureau of Prisons had originally contracted to house low-risk, non-U.S. citizen inmates at this CAR prison. In a lawsuit filed in early December, the county claimed MTC failed to properly "oversee, manage, and repair" the facility and "turned a blind eye to the enormous problems that plagued the Prison from its inception." The county had received revenues as high as $2.7 million a year from the prison operation, under its arrangement with the FBOP and MTC.

Before obtaining the CAR contract, the tent prison was an immigrant detention center that was alleged to harbor chronic sexual assault, physical abuse, and medical neglect. In 2011, months after immigration officials ended their contract with MTC, federal prison officials decided to send immigrants convicted of crimes (typically for criminal re-entry) to Willacy. The Texas ACLU had long alleged that private prison contractors running institutions such as Willacy cut corners in order to boost shareholder profits. That invariably led to medical under-staffing and extreme cost cutting, putting both prisoners and staff at risk. In 2014, the group documented complaints inside Willacy that caused it to be dangerous. A prisoner said,

They have a lot of people in here. Sometimes it smells. It's too many people. Some people even talk about burning this place down. They just don't have enough space for all of us here. Sometimes it makes me go crazy.

The suit pleadings said that inmates dealt with conditions so intolerable that some were forced to stay in solitary confinement. MTC posted only a solitary guard to oversee each housing pod on each shift. "The unacceptable conditions caused by mismanagement and its failure to take remediate them led to the riot on February 20, 2015." Ultimately, the BOP forced the prison to be vacated, declaring it "uninhabitable" due to MTC's failures. All 400 employees of the prison were discharged. The pleadings further claim MTC routinely failed to alert government officials about its problems there.

==== Diboll ====
In July 2014, a portion of an internal ceiling collapsed in a dayroom at the Diboll Unit Correctional Center. A number of inmates were taken to the hospital, where one was listed as being in critical condition. The Texas Department of Criminal Justice announced plans to take over direct operation of Diboll Unit in 2023.

=== Arizona State Prison – Kingman ===
On July 30, 2010, three prisoners convicted of homicide escaped after MTC workers ignored alarms indicating a breached fence. Two MTC employees resigned afterward, a unit warden and a unit security chief.

On September 20, the Arizona Department of Corrections reported the escape went undetected for an unknown period of time because the security system between the perimeter fences, which should have detected the prisoners passing through, had been incorrectly installed, and it had not worked properly for the previous two and a half years.

One escapee was captured 28 hours later after a shootout with law enforcement in Rifle, Colorado. He was eventually sentenced to 48 years in the Colorado prison system. The other two prisoners and their accomplice robbed, hijacked and kidnapped two truck drivers. Three days later, the ringleader hijacked, kidnapped, killed and incinerated two vacationers in New Mexico. He and his fellow escapee and their accomplice were captured within 20 days.

A second escapee is now serving a life term in federal prison under an assumed name. In 2014, the jury rejected the death penalty for the ringleader who was sentenced to life, plus 235 years in federal prison. John "Charlie" McCluskey died at the age of 52 on March 7, 2017, at a maximum-security federal prison outside of Florence, Colorado. Their accomplice was sentenced to 40 years in federal prison and has been serving it at Fort Worth's Federal Medical Center, Carswell.

Subsequently, Arizona corrections officials stopped sending new inmates to the facility, which they said was "dysfunctional." MTC threatened to sue the state for breach of contract, which had guaranteed the facility 97% occupancy, and for the loss of $10 million in revenue from empty beds. The state renegotiated the contract and paid MTC $3 million.

On January 19, 2015, 23-year-old inmate Neil Early died in a hospital in Las Vegas after being sexually and fatally assaulted in the MTC-operated prison located in Golden Valley, Arizona. A search there found numerous weapons, illegal cell phones, and a quantity of heroin. A guard working a 16-hour shift had been supervising 200 inmates at the time of the attack on Early. Early's parents filed suit for millions against the state, MTC, and a prison medical provider, alleging medical intervention had been delayed after Early was found beaten and sexually assaulted.

Between July 1–4, 2015, riots broke out again here, during which nine guards and seven inmates were injured. The state brought in 96 members of its special tactical unit to quell the riot.

In August 2015, Arizona governor Doug Ducey terminated the contract with MTC after an Arizona Department of Corrections investigative report revealed the company had "a culture of disorganization, disengagement, and disregard" of DOC policies.

Bids were sought and the state awarded a new contract to Florida's GEO Group, effective December 1, 2015. GEO had contributed $2,000 to Ducey's 2014 campaign for Governor, plus $50,000 more to an Independent expenditure Superpac that exclusively supported Ducey's candidacy.

=== Mississippi ===
MTC was awarded the contract for the Walnut Grove Correctional Facility after the state cancelled that of GEO Group in the summer of 2012.

In 2013, the American Civil Liberties Union filed a lawsuit against MTC for intolerable conditions at the East Mississippi Correctional Facility (EMCF), the state prison for prisoners with mental illness. The ACLU described this as an "extremely dangerous facility" where "basic human rights are violated daily." Many prisoners had reportedly been unable to access appropriate medical care, even for life-threatening conditions. The federal trial in April 2018 has been the scene of testimony from numerous prisoners of abuse, killings, suicide, and neglect at this facility.

In November 2014, MTC was named among numerous private firms in corruption charges during the arraignment of Mississippi Corrections Commissioner Christopher Epps; he was charged with receiving $1,900,000 in bribes in exchange for lucrative contracts to private prison and subcontractor firms, which had ties to Cecil McCrory, a Republican former state legislator. According to the indictment, the bribes occurred as the East Mississippi Correctional Facility was descending into "hellish chaos" with gang violence routine, medical care substandard, and corruption rampant among corrections officers. On February 25, 2015, Epps pleaded guilty to tax evasion and taking bribes. He took "about $2 million" in exchange for prison contracts.

After Epps was indicted, Mississippi Governor Phil Bryant quickly ordered renegotiation of the $60 million MTC contract to operate three state prisons: Walnut Grove Correctional Facility, East Mississippi Correctional Facility and Marshall County Correctional Facility, and a fourth, Wilkinson County Correctional Facility, which had been managed by the Corrections Corporation of America, now known as CoreCivic, all of which involved McCrory and Epps. MTC had been sued for mistreatment of inmates in two of those prisons.

After his indictment, McCrory had at first plea bargained to lesser federal charges. Before being hired as a consultant by MTC, he had begun working as a consultant to Cornell Companies and GEO, which had paid him $10,000 monthly. MTC subsequently won all four contracts and hired McCrory as a consultant. Upon the disclosure of the federal charges, MTC fired McCrory, claiming they knew nothing of his criminal activities. According to the indictments, MTC confirmed that it paid McCrory $12,000 a month and had hired him at Epps' recommendation. The company stated Epps had not forced it to hire McCrory.

MTC spokesman Issa Arnita said that Epps "made us aware of the fee McCrory had charged in the past to other contractors" and had worked for GEO Group, the Boca Raton, Florida for-profit prison firm which held the contracts that were subsequently awarded to MTC. MTC denied any knowledge of alleged inappropriate relationships between Epps and McCrory. The indictment recounts a 2012 conversation quoting Epps telling McCrory that he had persuaded MTC to hire him, with them to split MTC's payments after taxes. The indictment has Epps saying, "I got us $12,000 per month."

Epps was originally scheduled to be sentenced on June 9, 2015, but on June 8 federal authorities first announced that the sentencing was indefinitely delayed. McCrory, co-defendant in the Epps case, moved to withdraw his guilty plea and have a trial scheduled. Consequently, the sentencing of Epps was again postponed. The sentencing was delayed by the judge to allow defense lawyers additional time to review materials concerning how much money was gained by 15 corporations paying bribes to the pair. Prosecutors hoped to use the evidence to increase the recommended prison sentences for Epps and McCrory.

On December 21, 2016, Judge Wingate rejected McCrory's request to withdraw his plea, and set a new date for sentencing. The FBI had testified that McCrory had admitted in their first interview with him to laundering $40,000 in cash for Epps, and that he began wearing a recording device for his conversations with Epps. McCrory was free on bail, and was sentenced to 8 1/2 years in prison on February 2, 2017. As of December 17, 2017, McCrory was being held at the Federal Correctional Institution, Talladega, Alabama, with an anticipated release date of April 24, 2025.

In mid-June 2016, in the face of declining prison populations and the removal of juveniles to more suitable facilities, the state announced it would close the Walnut Grove Correctional Facility. That was accomplished on September 16, 2016. It was anticipated to have a devastating effect on the local rural and small-town economy.

On February 8, 2017, Mississippi Attorney General Jim Hood filed suit against MTC, along with Cornell Companies, Wexford Health Sources, Global Tel Link, Sentinel Offender Services and many others for allegedly engaging in corrupt contracts with the Mississippi Department of Corrections and Epps, its former Commissioner. The lawsuit claims the companies violated Mississippi public ethics, racketeering, and antitrust laws, and it was suing to recover costs and penalties of the corrupt contracts.

On May 25, 2017, Judge Wingate sentenced Epps to 235 months (19.6 years) in federal prison. Wingate, who was appointed to the federal bench in 1985 said, "This is the largest graft operation that certainly I have seen, and I have seen a lot." Wingate cited the Flowood incident as the reason why he gave a sentence that was longer than the 13 years recommended by prosecutors. By July 2017 Epps was moved to Federal Correctional Institution, Seagoville in Seagoville, Texas.

On January 24, 2019, the Mississippi Attorney General's office announced it had collected a total of $27 million in lawsuits filed against companies accused of funneling bribes and kickbacks to Epps. That amount included $5.2 million from MTC.

=== Illinois ===
About 100 Hopkins Park residents demonstrated in July 2016 against an MTC proposed immigration prison there. Larger competitors had also been rejected: Corrections Corporation of America in Joliet and Crete, Illinois, and GEO Group in Hobart and Gary, Indiana due to similar protests. Protesters said that Arizona's cancellation of the MTC contract at Kingman state prison was reason not to do business with the company.

=== Idaho ===
In a 24-month period ending in 2016, there were 175 incidents of violence requiring disciplinary action at the Correctional Alternative Placement Program (CAPP) in Kuna, a 430-bed facility. It is the last for-profit prison in the state since the Idaho Department of Corrections was forced to take over a prison operated by Corrections Corporation of America, following national coverage of massive, fraudulent overbilling, lack of oversight, and six-figure corporate campaign contributions to the incumbent governor.

=== Florida ===
State Representative David Richardson, a legislative watchdog, made frequent surprise visits over a year and a half to the Gadsden Correctional Facility in Quincy, which holds over 1,500 women. MTC had the contract since 2010.

On his initial visit, he found many of the classrooms without teachers, others without required supplies, and he was determined to return. He also found its inmates had endured months deprived of heat and hot water, found their bathrooms flooded every day, and were subjected to water rationing because the sewage system was malfunctioning.

Though the facility had received approval of a $10,000 state-funded purchase of a new water heater, its warden never bothered to authorize the replacement. MTC spokesman Issa Arnita acknowledged that management a year earlier, became "...aware of hot water issues at the facility." He said, "While we've made short-term fixes, the entire system will ultimately need to be replaced."

On February 23, 2017, Richardson returned for a scheduled visit accompanied by two other legislators and the director of the Florida Department of Management Services (DMS) which is responsible for overseeing the operations of, and conditions within, private prisons. In the two days before their arrival, institution work crews finally addressed many of the long-backlogged 495 repair orders. The state quickly replaced its on-site monitor.

When Richardson returned with two investigators from the Florida Department of Corrections (FDOC), as requested by the DMS Office of the Inspector General, other problems were revealed at the prison. Although prisoners said they had been intimidated against complaining to inspectors and feared retaliation, one had sent Richardson a detailed list of 23 serious plumbing problems in just a single housing unit.

In February 2017, Richardson requested Governor Rick Scott to direct state officials to take over management of the prison, warning that the health and safety of inmates was at risk.

== See also ==
- 2010 Arizona prison escape
- Arizona SB 1070
- Arizona State Prison – Kingman
- Bluebonnet Detention Center
- Central North Correctional Centre
- Eagle Mountain Community Correctional Facility
- East Mississippi Correctional Facility
- Estes Unit
- Idaho Department of Correction
- Incarceration in the United States
- Kyle, Texas
- List of detention sites in the United States
- List of members of the American Legislative Exchange Council
- Marana Community Correctional Treatment Facility
- Marshall County Correctional Facility
- Operation Mississippi Hustle
- Red Rock Job Corps Center
- Walnut Grove Correctional Facility
- Wilkinson County Correctional Center
- Willacy County Correctional Center
- Willacy Detention Center
- James A. Joseph
- Lane McCotter
