= David Richardson (Florida politician) =

American politician (born 1957)

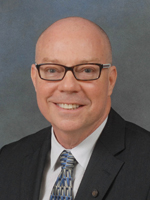

Member of the Miami Beach Board of Commissioners
- Incumbent
- Assumed office November 25, 2019

Member of the Florida House of Representatives from the 113th district
- In office November 6, 2012 – November 6, 2018
- Preceded by: Redistricted
- Succeeded by: Michael Grieco

Personal details
- Born: April 25, 1957 (age 69) Houston, Texas, U.S.
- Party: Democratic
- Education: University of Central Florida (BS, BSBA); University of Tampa (MBA)
- Profession: Accountant

David Richardson (born April 25, 1957) is an American politician who served as a member of the Florida House of Representatives for the 113th district from 2012 to 2018. Richardson was elected as a Miami Beach commissioner in November 2019.

== Early life and education ==
Richardson was born in Houston, Texas, and moved to Florida in 1968, where he attended Lyman High School in Longwood. After graduation, he attended the University of Central Florida, where he first received a Bachelor of Science degree in biology in 1979, then his Bachelor of Science in Business Administration degree in accountancy in 1983. Afterward, he attended the University of Tampa while working for the United States Department of Defense as an auditor, and received his Master of Business Administration degree in 1987.

In 2015, Richardson completed Harvard University's John F. Kennedy School of Government program for Senior Executives in State and Local Government as a David Bohnett LGBTQ Victory Institute Leadership Fellow.

== Career ==
After graduating from the University of Tampa, Richardson worked for Ernst & Young as an accountant before starting an advisory services firm.

=== Florida House of Representatives ===
In 2012, following the reconfiguration of the state's legislative districts and following the resignation of Representative Richard L. Steinberg due to a harassing text-messages scandal, an open seat was created in the 113th district. Richardson opted to run, and faced Mark Weithorn, the husband of Miami Beach City Commissioner Deede Weithorn; Adam Kravitz, the founder of JDate; and Waldo Faura in the Democratic primary. He received 33% of the vote to Weithorn's 26%, Kravitz's 24%, and Faura's 16%, advancing to the general election, where he was elected unopposed. His victory in the general election, along with the victory of Joe Saunders that same year, allowed both Richardson and Saunders to be the first openly gay members of the state legislature.

When Darryl Rouson, who was set to serve as the Democratic floor leader in the Florida House of Representatives for the 2014-2016 legislative term, created an independent fundraising committee independent of the state party apparatus, Richardson called for Rouson to resign from his position in a letter sent to members of the caucus. Richardson ended up making a motion to vacate Rouson's position, which was seconded and then passed, resulting in a new election for the position.

In 2014, Richardson was re-elected to his second term in the legislature without opposition. In a district that is 60% Hispanic, he received over 64% of the vote in 2016. In 2017, when running for the 2018-2020 leadership of the House minority caucus, he withdrew from the race, recommending that the party pick between two other leading candidates to ensure greater delegation unity.

Richardson filed to run for HD-106 in 2022, attempting a return to the legislature, but after redistricting and entry into races by other candidates, he decided instead to serve out his term on the Miami Beach Commission, where he has served since 2019.

=== Oversight of state agencies ===
During the 2013 legislative session, Richardson authored legislation that would appoint an Inspector General to look over the affairs of the Citizens Property Insurance Corporation, declaring, "After learning of severe managerial shortcomings at Citizens, including reports of lavish spending on travel, reports of severance packages for employees who had faced abuse charges, and unprofessional behavior of staff, I immediately recognized the need for stronger state oversight."

Richardson made frequent surprise visits over a year and a half to the Gadsden Correctional Facility, which holds over 1,500 women. On his initial visit, he found many of the classrooms without teachers, others without required supplies, and he was determined to return. A 2004 audit, Report Number 2005-61, by the Florida Department of Management Services (DMS) Office of the Inspector General (OIG) found CCA had been paid $2,850,000 more for Gadsden's facility physical upkeep than it ultimately spent for repairs, and that the state was jointly overcharged by $13 million paid to its contractors, CCA and GEO Group for private prison operations. The Quincy, Florida prison had been taken away from the former Corrections Corporation of America (CCA), now known as CoreCivic, in 2010, after years of mismanagement. Richardson had also discovered that another CoreCivic-operated prison in Florida, the Lake City Correctional Facility, had overcharged Florida by $16 million or more over a seven-year period.

Since 2010, Gadsden has since been operated by Utah's Management and Training Corporation (MTC), but the contracted facility maintenance issues have continued. He found its inmates had endured months deprived of heat and hot water, found their bathrooms flooded every day, and were subjected to water rationing because the sewage system was malfunctioning. Though the facility had received approval of a $10,000 state funded expenditure for a new water heater, its warden never bothered to authorize the replacement. MTC spokesman Issa Arnita acknowledged that management a year earlier, became “...aware of hot water issues at the facility." He said, "While we’ve made short-term fixes, the entire system will ultimately need to be replaced.” On February 23, 2017, Richardson returned for a scheduled visit accompanied by two other legislators and the director of the DMS which is responsible for overseeing the performance of and conditions within private prisons. In the two days before their arrival, institution work crews finally addressed many of the long backlogged 495 repair orders. The state quickly replaced its on-site monitor. When Richardson returned with two investigators from the Florida Department of Corrections (FDOC) as requested by the state's DMS OIG, other problems emerged at the prison. Although prisoners said they had been intimidated against complaining to inspectors and feared retribution, one had sent Richardson a detailed list of 23 serious plumbing problems in just a single housing unit. In March, Richardson requested to Governor Rick Scott that he direct the state officials to take over management of the prison, warning that the health and safety of inmates was being risked. Richardson has been equally dedicated to seeing that problems in Florida's youth prisons get fixed as well. In this task, Julie Jones, Secretary of the FDOC, has appreciated his efforts. “We’ve been very collegial and very open to everything he’s had to suggest,” she said. She valued his intervention and closed a dorm in the Lancaster facility after his discovery that substantial interior mold growth made its continuing use dangerous.

=== 2018 U.S. House race ===
On June 6, 2017, Richardson announced that he would run to succeed Republican Ileana Ros-Lehtinen, after her announcement that she would not run for reelection in the 27th district which seat she has held since 1989. Prior to this, Richardson had made a name for himself as a voluble and respected critic regarding the mismanagement of state bureaucracies, particularly within both the public and for-profit sectors of corrections. He made site visits to many of Florida's prisons and used his forensic skills to critically examine agency budgets and expenditures. Despite Ros-Lehtinen's long tenure, the district favored Hillary Clinton by 20 points over Donald Trump in the 2016 presidential election. It had been trending Democratic for some time before then; it voted for Barack Obama in both his presidential bids. In a race much closer than predicted, he was beaten by Donna Shalala, the former president of the University of Miami and the Secretary of Health and Human Services in the cabinet of Bill Clinton. On August 28, 2018, Shalala won the Democratic primary over Richardson. Shalala, the best-known Democratic candidate won by less than 2,000 votes, 31.9% to 27.5%, in a race substantially closer than polling predicted. Shalala won the general election by six points, with 51.8%.
