= Randy Schoenwetter =

American murderer

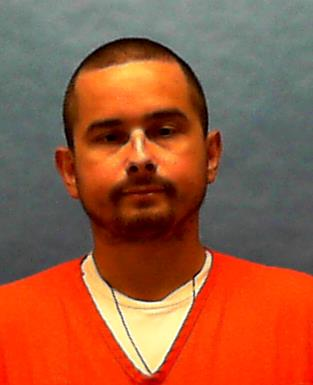
- Born: Randy Lamar Ingram Schoenwetter; October 27, 1981 (age 44)
- Occupation: Unemployed
- Status: Incarcerated in Tomoka Correctional Institution
- Convictions: First-degree murder, attempted first-degree murder, armed burglary,
- Penalty: Death sentence, commuted to life

Details
- Imprisoned at: Tomoka Correctional Institution

Randy Lamar Ingram Schoenwetter (born October 27, 1981) is an American prisoner convicted of the August 12, 2000, murder of Ronald Friskey (aged 53) and his daughter Virginia (aged 11), and the attempted murder of Haesun Friskey. Apprehended shortly after the murders, Schoenwetter confessed and pleaded guilty to all charges. He was sentenced to death on December 5, 2003. At the time of his sentencing, he became the youngest person on death row. His death sentence was overturned in 2021 and he was resentenced to life.

== Killings ==
On August 12, 2000, Randy Schoenwetter rode his bicycle from the apartment he shared with his mother in Titusville, Florida, to the restaurant where he worked. A short time later, he left the restaurant and headed to the home of his friend, Chad Friskey, with the intent to rape one of Friskey's sisters. Around 5:00 am, Schoenwetter entered the house through a sliding glass door and armed himself with a 12-inch knife from the kitchen. Finding 16-year-old Theresa Friskey's bedroom locked, Schoenwetter entered Virginia's room. While he was in her room, she woke up and screamed. He held his hand over her mouth and threatened her, but she continued to scream. When she recognized him and said his name, Schoenwetter began to leave, but Virginia's parents, Ronald and Haesun, caught him. A struggle ensued and Schoenwetter fought them with the knife. He then returned to Virginia's room and killed her, because she had recognized him. Theresa heard the commotion and called 911. Ronald managed to get outside and was seen by neighbors, who called 911 when they saw that he was injured; he later died from his wounds. Haesun was critically injured, but survived.

Following the murders, Schoenwetter rode home on his bike and took a shower. He then disposed of the clothes he was wearing and the knife used in the attack by placing them in a trash bag and throwing the bag in a dumpster.

== Arrest and trial ==
Officers followed a trail of blood from the crime scene to the Schoenwetter residence. While detectives were talking to Schoenwetter's mother, who was outside the apartment, Randy walked by. Detectives noticed that he had injuries consistent with having been in a fight. Randy Schoenwetter was taken to the police station for an interview, where he confessed. DNA evidence extracted from blood found at the crime scene and on Schoenwetter's clothing confirmed his confession. He was held at Brevard County Jail and denied bail.

Randy Schoenwetter was indicted on August 29, 2000, and charged with two counts of first-degree murder in the deaths of Ronald and Virginia Friskey, the attempted first-degree murder of Haesun Friskey, and armed burglary. Schoenwetter wrote a letter to the judge confessing his guilt and changing his plea to guilty.

Schoenwetter's attorneys argued that he should be spared the death penalty due to mitigating factors. Schoenwetter was diagnosed with Asperger syndrome by two mental health experts. The diagnosis was confirmed by a PET scan, which showed abnormalities in his brain associated with the disorder, but this defense was rejected on the grounds that the diagnosis failed to explain Schoenwetter's actions. He was sentenced to death for each of the murders, and life in prison for the attempted murder and burglary charges.

== Appeals ==
Schoenwetter filed an appeal claiming that his confession should have been suppressed because it was obtained illegally, and that the evidence obtained from his clothing should have been suppressed because it was found as a result of an unlawful interrogation. However, this appeal was denied because Schoenwetter voluntarily accompanied detectives to the police station and consented to provide a DNA sample. He also claimed that his attorneys were incompetent because they failed to prove that his mental disability was a mitigating factor, and that his death sentence was unconstitutional because of that disability. This appeal was rejected on the grounds that a mental illness does not make one ineligible for the death penalty.

Schoenwetter remained on death row until 2021, when he was resentenced to life following Hurst v. Florida.
