= Robert L. Marquardt =

Founder of Management & Training Corporation (1925–2012)

- Born: December 25, 1925; Dayton, OH
- Died: January 14, 2012 (aged 86); Ogden, Utah
- Occupation: CEO

Robert L. Marquardt (December 25, 1925 – January 14, 2012) was the founder and owner of Management & Training Corporation, the third largest prison contractor in the United States.

== Biography ==
Robert Marquardt was born in Dayton, Ohio, the youngest child of Willard H. Marquardt and Enid Gilbert Marquardt. He is reputed to have started neighborhood businesses even as a child. Marquardt was educated at Denison University (B.A.), California Western School of Law (M.B.A.), California Western School of Law (Ph.D.), and Weber State College (Ph.D.).

Moving to Ogden, Utah in 1960, Marquardt became Director of Marketing at Thiokol Chemical Corporation. Later, as Group Vice President there, he helped move the company into operation of running Job Corps Centers for the Department of Labor.

Eventually, he spun off the division into its own company, Management & Training Corp, which continued to be a government contractor for training, but also came to be a major nationwide prison management contractor.

In 2012, Robert Marquardt died after a four-year battle with bone cancer.
