= Diboll Unit =

State prison for men in Texas, US

Diboll Unit (Diboll Correctional Center)
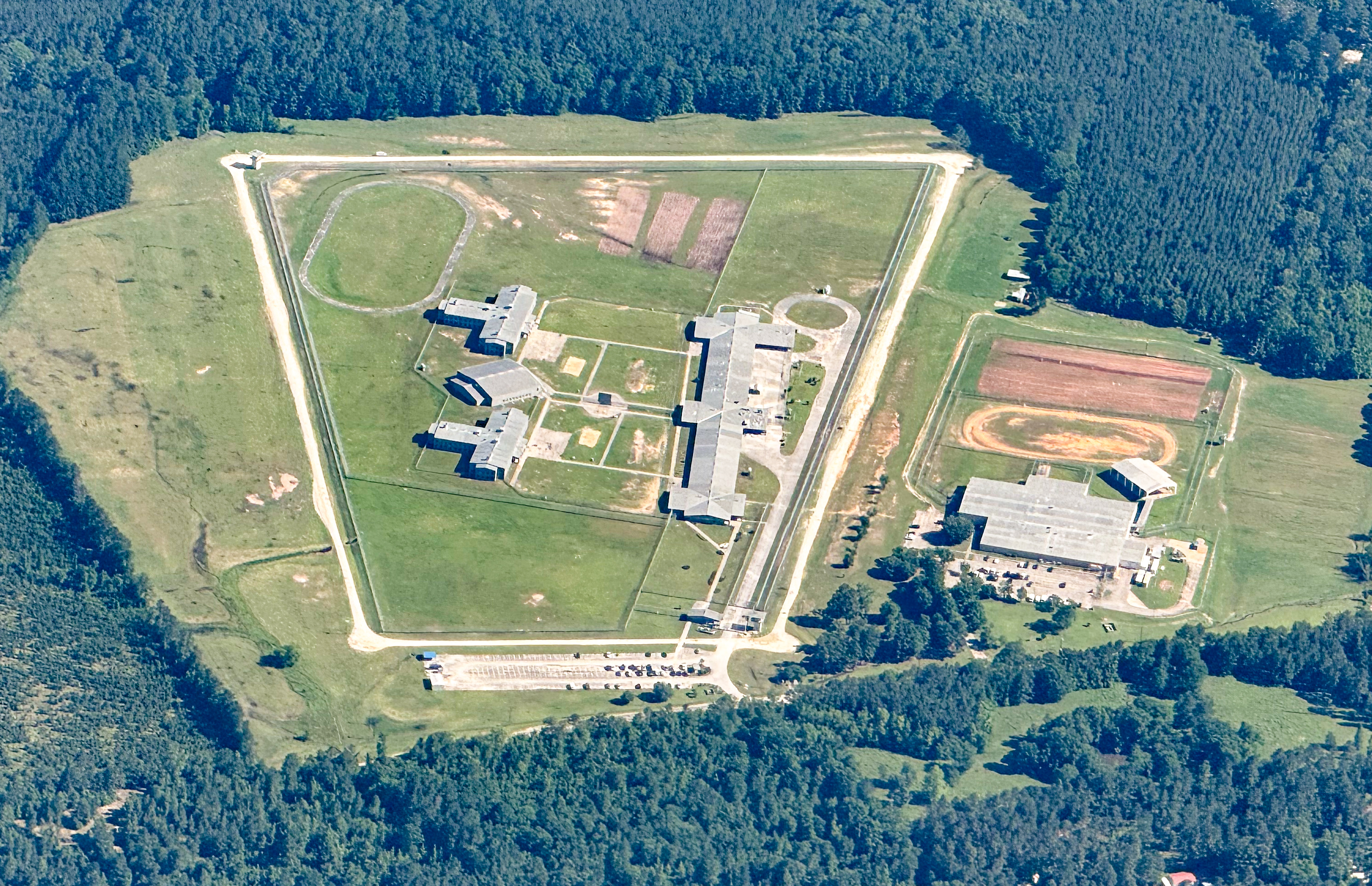
- Interactive map of Diboll Unit (Diboll Correctional Center)
- Location: 1604 South 1st Street Diboll, Texas; 31°10′24″N 94°48′22″W
- Status: open
- Security class: G1, G2
- Capacity: 518
- Opened: June 1995
- Managed by: Texas Department of Criminal Justice

The Diboll Unit (or Diboll Correctional Center) is a state prison for men located in Diboll, Angelina County, Texas, which is operated by Texas Department of Criminal Justice.

This facility was opened in June 1995, and a maximum capacity of 518 male inmates. Diboll is adjacent to the Rufus H. Duncan Geriatric Facility at 1502 South First Street, owned and operated by the state.

== Notable inmates ==
- George Floyd
