= Lake City Correctional Facility =

Prison in Lake City, Florida, United States

Coordinates: 30°11′34″N 82°30′28″W

- Interactive map of Lake City Correctional Facility
- Location: 7906 US-90 Lake City, Florida
- Status: mixed (male youthful offender 19–24)
- Capacity: 894
- Opened: 1997
- Managed by: Corrections Corporation of America

Lake City Correctional Facility is a private state prison for male youthful offenders ages 18 - 24, located in Lake City, Columbia County, Florida. It's been operated since 1997 by CoreCivic, formerly known as Corrections Corporation of America (CCA), under contract with the Florida Department of Corrections. This facility was opened in 1997 and has a maximum capacity of 894 prisoners.

The facility is close to two Florida state prisons, the Columbia Correctional Institution and its Annex.
