= Estes Unit =

American Prison

Sanders Estes Unit (VS)
- Interactive map of Sanders Estes Unit (VS)
- Location: 1100 Highway 1807 Venus, Texas 76084; 32.407411°N 97.095648°W
- Status: Operational
- Capacity: 1,040
- Opened: 1989
- Managed by: Texas Department of Criminal Justice
- Warden: Stephen McAdams (2010–2013) Randy Treon (2013–2021) Grady Wallace (2022- Current)

The Sanders "Sandy" Estes Unit is a prison in Venus, Texas. It is owned and operated by the Texas Department of Criminal Justice.

== Background ==
Originally opened in 1989, the Sanders Estes Correctional Center houses minimum and medium security inmates. In January 2009, MTC was awarded a 6-year, 9-month contract to operate the facility.
