= Willacy County Correctional Center =

Former prison in Texas, United States

- Interactive map of Willacy County Correctional Center
- Location: Raymondville, Willacy County, Texas, United States; 26°28′03″N 97°45′57″W
- Status: Closed
- Security class: Immigration detention facility
- Capacity: 3,000
- Population: 1,453 avg. daily (March 12, 2009)
- Opened: 2006
- Closed: March 2015
- Managed by: Management & Training Corporation

Willacy County Correctional Center is a closed detention center located on the east side of Route 77, at the edge of Raymondville City, Willacy County, Texas, United States.

The facility was within the jurisdiction of the Bureau of Prisons, and was managed by the contractor Management & Training Corporation.

It was the largest immigrant detention facility in the United States, but subsequently was used as a prison for repeat offenders who had been captured while crossing the border illegally".

The facility was the subject of numerous media reports and incidents related to illegal conduct of personnel. It was known as "Tent City" and "Ritmo".

After a riot and fire on February 20, 2015 destroyed much of the facility, rendering it uninhabitable, 2,800 federal Bureau of Prisons inmates were removed and the facility was closed. In March 2015, Standard and Poors downgraded the prison bonds to "junk" status. At the time of the closing, the bond debt balance was about $128 million, and the annual payments due for the bond debt were about $8 million a year.

This facility is adjacent to two other private prisons: the Willacy County Regional Detention Center, operated by the Management and Training Corporation housing federal prisoners for the U.S. Marshal Service, and the Willacy County State Jail, operated by the Corrections Corporation of America under contract with the state of Texas.

== History ==
=== Construction and upgrade ===
Willacy was built at a cost of $65 million by Management & Training Corporation for U.S. Immigration and Customs Enforcement in May 2006. It was upgraded in July 2007. In June 2008, 1,086 new beds were added. The first 2000 beds in the facility were constructed in 10 pod-like synthetic domes completed in 90 days.

=== 2011 agreement ===
Under this new agreement, the maximum capacity of the facility was defined as 3,117 beds filled. At capacity, the county would receive an extra $577,612 per year, for a total maximum possible revenue to the county of $2,844,262 per year.

By 2012, the facility began to seem financially unsustainable. Press reports indicated that Willacy County might be responsible for the bonds sold by the Willacy County Local Government Corporation to finance expansion at the jail. A key to the dispute would have been the future occupancy rate of the facility and the exact terms of the contract with federal government.

=== 2015 prison riot ===
On February 20, 2015, a riot broke out among the inmates. Using pipes as weapons, they were able to gain control of portions of the prison before officers were able to regain control on February 21. Prisoners burned down the massive Kevlar tents. The riot left the prison uninhabitable. As a result, all 2,800 inmates were sent to other facilities.

=== Post-riot ===
In March 2017, Willacy County sold the site to Management and Training Corporation. In July 2018, U.S. Immigration and Customs Enforcement (ICE) announced a contract to construct a 1,000-bed detention center at the former facility site.

== Description ==
The facility consisted of ten large, 13,000 square foot, windowless domed structures constructed from a firm, rubbery, Kevlar fabric. Each oval-shaped tent housed 200 detainees, along with four dorms that housed 200 detainees each. The tents were completely windowless with the lights kept on 24 hours a day. There were no partitions separating the showers, toilets, sinks and eating areas.

Another 300 beds in the facility were for solitary confinement prisoners, (10% being double the standard rate for federal prisons). The Nation reported that when the facility was at or above capacity, prisoners without disciplinary problems were put in solitary confinement.

There are several other buildings, with the whole compound surrounded by chain link fence and razor-type concertina wire.

== Population ==
During 2007, the average population was 1,474. According to a standard Annual Detention Review by Creative Corrections on March 12, 2009, the facility had an average daily population of 1,217 males, and 236 females, with a total of 491,636 "man-days" during the previous 12 months.

Between March 12, 2008 and March 12, 2009, the facility had a total population intake of 27,284.

As of March, 2009, the capacity for adult males became 2,750 men, and 250 women.

As at March, 2009, the basic rate per man-day was $78.00. In 2009, the average population was 1,381.

=== Departures ===
The following table shows detainees leaving detention during a 12-month period between approximately March 2007 and March 2008:

Nationalities (top 10)	Total	Deported/ voluntary departure	Percent
El Salvador	7,779	7,599	97.6%
Honduras	4,239	4,131	97.4%
Mexico	1,245	1,022	82.0%
Guatemala	796	707	88.8%
Nicaragua	481	454	94.3%
Brazil	215	187	86.9%
Ecuador	117	53	45.2%
China	69	5	7.2%
Dominican Republic	69	43	62.3%
Colombia	56	34	60.7%
Total	15,502	14,406	92.9%

A memorandum dated March 7, 2008, from the American Bar Association Delegation to Willacy, to James T. Hayes, Jr., Acting Director, Office of Detention and Removal, Immigration and Customs Enforcement, summarized and evaluated information gathered during an August 28, 2007 visit. Some of the findings are as follows:

Detainees

- On the day of the delegation's visit, the detainee population was 1,216. This was lower than the normal amount, as the approaching Hurricane Dean may have prompted an evacuation of the facility.
- The detainees were from twenty-three countries, including Mexico, Panama, South Korea, Russia, El Salvador, Honduras, Guatemala, and Nicaragua, but none from the Middle East.
- Detainees making asylum claims got transferred the facilities at Port Isabel, Texas, or Pearsall, Texas.
- Normally, a detainee stayed for twenty-one days.

Staff

- Willacy was funded for 109 ICE employees, but the facility had only 60, with many of these ICE officers often being away accompanying detainees or handling other off-site activities.
- A further 422 employees from Management & Training Corporation worked at the facility.
- Most of the guards were male between 19 and 24 years of age, having a high school education, and earning $14.95 per hour. Each underwent a criminal background check before being hired, and all received two weeks of academy training, followed by a week of on-the-job training.

Facilities

- Willacy had four immigration courts and a room for attorney visitation, normally with one or two judges per week presiding over immigration proceedings.
- Detainees were housed in "sprung structures" produced by Houston contractor Hale Mills, the exterior walls of which are constructed from a firm, rubbery, Kevlar fabric.
- There were a total ten housing units, each being divided into four pods, each approximately 13,000 square feet. The capacity of each pod was fifty detainees, with each building therefore holding a maximum of 200 individuals.
- There were no children kept at the facility.

== Controversies ==
The facility has been the subject of multiple reports of abuse. Between October, 2008 and October 2011, 170 allegations of sexual abuse have been reported at Willacy. The 2009 audit of the facility stated that over 900 grievances were filed. Four have been resolved.

In a report on NPR radio in 2007, former inmates recounted how they were forced to eat with their hands as they were not always given eating utensils.

In November 2008 Alberto Gonzales, former Attorney General of the United States was indicted along with Dick Cheney and other elected officials, by a Willacy County grand jury. They were accused of stopping an investigation into abuses at the detention center. A judge dismissed the indictments, and chastised Juan Angel Guerra, the Willacy County district attorney who brought the case. Guerra had himself been under indictment for over a year and a half before the judge dismissed the indictment.

Physical abuse

Former Willacy guard Sigrid Adameit claims to have witnessed two supervisors and two officers beating a detainee, knocking out his teeth, and leaving him with a black eye and broken nose. She claimed that she was shown the video of the incident and asked to "clean up" the statements of the guards in order to make them consistent with the evidence. The following morning, the detainee was put aboard the "first flight" out of the facility.

Sexual abuse

Twana Cooks-Allen, a Former Mental Health Coordinator at Willacy, received numerous complaints, including harassment by guards for sexual favours.

On June 22, 2011, Contract Security Officer Edwin Rodriguez was arrested, and subsequently charged with the sexual abuse of a female detainee.

Cocaine distribution

On November 10, 2010, guard Christopher George Gonzalez was arrested for allegedly conspiring to possess with the intent to distributed cocaine.

Human trafficking

In November 2007, four Willacy employees were charged in relation to their use of company vehicles to smuggle illegal immigrants through checkpoints. They were caught smuggling 28 illegal immigrants through the U.S. Border Patrol's Sarita checkpoint, situated approximately 100 miles north of Brownsville. The immigrants were from Mexico, the Dominican Republic, Honduras, Guatemala and El Salvador. Two of the men charged were wearing their uniforms and driving a company van, apparently overloaded with the immigrants.

Riot

On February 21, 2015, inmates rioted over issues such as poor medical care and "brutal conditions." Three of the Kevlar tents were burned and the prison was rendered "uninhabitable" according to the federal Bureau of Prisons which had contracted with MTC to manage 2,800 inmates. At the time of the closing, the bond debt balance was about $128 million, and the annual payments due for the bond debt were about $8 million a year.

== See also ==
- South Texas Family Residential Center, also in Texas, the largest detention center in the United States
- Illegal immigration to the United States
- Immigration detention in the United States
- Immigration detention § United States
- U.S. Immigration and Customs Enforcement#Detention centers
