= List of United States attorneys appointed by Joe Biden =

This is a list of United States attorneys appointed by the 46th president of the United States, Joe Biden.

President Biden nominated 76 people to be U.S. attorneys: 68 of the nominations were confirmed by the U.S. Senate, five stalled in the Senate, one was withdrawn after Senate confirmation, and three others were withdrawn before Senate action. There are a total of 93 U.S. attorneys in the Department of Justice.

== Color key ==
Denotes appointees serving in an acting or interim capacity.

Denotes appointees who have left office or offices which have been disbanded.

== Appointments ==
District	Attorney	Assumed office	Left office
Alaska
U.S. Attorney for the District of Alaska	S. Lane Tucker	May 31, 2022 (Confirmed May 17, 2022 by voice vote)	February 8, 2025
Arizona
U.S. Attorney for the District of Arizona	Gary M. Restaino	November 23, 2021 (Confirmed November 19, 2021, by voice vote)	February 17, 2025
California
U.S. Attorney for the C.D. of California	E. Martin Estrada	September 19, 2022 (Confirmed September 13, 2022 by voice vote)	January 17, 2025
U.S. Attorney for the E.D. of California	Phillip Talbert	June 23, 2022 (Confirmed June 23, 2022 by voice vote)	January 11, 2025
U.S. Attorney for the N.D. of California	Ismail Ramsey	March 21, 2023 (Confirmed March 7, 2023 by voice vote)	February 12, 2025
U.S. Attorney for the S.D. of California	Tara McGrath	October 5, 2023 (Confirmed September 29, 2023, 52–37)	February 12, 2025
Colorado
U.S. Attorney for the District of Colorado	Cole Finegan	December 1, 2021 (Confirmed November 19, 2021, by voice vote)	May 31, 2024
Connecticut
U.S. Attorney for the District of Connecticut	Vanessa R. Avery	May 9, 2022 (Confirmed April 27, 2022, by voice vote)	January 18, 2025
District of Columbia
U.S. Attorney for the District of Columbia	Matthew M. Graves	November 5, 2021 (Confirmed October 28, 2021, by voice vote)	January 16, 2025
Florida
U.S. Attorney for the M.D. of Florida	Roger B. Handberg	December 8, 2022 (Confirmed December 6, 2022, by voice vote)	February 18, 2025
U.S. Attorney for the S.D. of Florida	Markenzy Lapointe	January 9, 2023 (Confirmed December 6, 2022, by voice vote)	January 17, 2025
Georgia
U.S. Attorney for the M.D. of Georgia	Peter D. Leary	December 12, 2022 (Confirmed December 6, 2022, by voice vote)	January 11, 2025
U.S. Attorney for the N.D. of Georgia	Ryan K. Buchanan	May 2, 2022 (Confirmed April 27, 2022, by voice vote)	January 19, 2025
U.S. Attorney for the S.D. of Georgia	Jill E. Steinberg	February 22, 2023 (Confirmed February 16, 2023, by voice vote)	January 17, 2025
Hawaii
U.S. Attorney for the District of Hawaii	Clare E. Connors	January 3, 2022 (Confirmed December 7, 2021, by voice vote)	January 19, 2025
Idaho
U.S. Attorney for the District of Idaho	Joshua Hurwit	June 17, 2022 (Confirmed June 13, 2022 by voice vote)	February 13, 2025
Illinois
U.S. Attorney for the C.D. of Illinois	Gregory K. Harris	December 13, 2021 (Confirmed December 7, 2021, by voice vote)	January 2, 2025
U.S. Attorney for the S.D. of Illinois	Rachelle Crowe	June 21, 2022 (Confirmed May 17, 2022 by voice vote)	February 18, 2025
Indiana
U.S. Attorney for the N.D. of Indiana	Clifford D. Johnson	October 6, 2021 (Confirmed September 30, 2021, by voice vote)	January 17, 2025
U.S. Attorney for the S.D. of Indiana	Zachary A. Myers	November 15, 2021 (Confirmed September 30, 2021, by voice vote)	January 18, 2025
Kansas
U.S. Attorney for the District of Kansas	Kate E. Brubacher	March 10, 2023 (Confirmed March 7, 2023 by voice vote)	January 19, 2025
Louisiana
U.S. Attorney for the M.D. of Louisiana	Ronald C. Gathe	December 13, 2021 (Confirmed December 7, 2021, by voice vote)	February 19, 2025
U.S. Attorney for the W.D. of Louisiana	Brandon B. Brown	December 10, 2021 (Confirmed December 7, 2021, by voice vote)	January 20, 2025
Maine
U.S. Attorney for the District of Maine	Darcie N. McElwee	October 8, 2021 (Confirmed October 5, 2021, by voice vote)	February 17, 2025
Maryland
U.S. Attorney for the District of Maryland	Erek Barron	October 7, 2021 (Confirmed September 30, 2021, by voice vote)	February 12, 2025
Massachusetts
U.S. Attorney for the District of Massachusetts	Rachael Rollins	January 10, 2022 (Confirmed December 8, 2021, 51–50) *Vice President Harris cast tie-breaking vote*	May 19, 2023
Michigan
U.S. Attorney for the E.D. of Michigan	Dawn N. Ison	December 21, 2021 (Confirmed December 14, 2021, by voice vote)	January 19, 2025
U.S. Attorney for the W.D. Michigan	Mark Totten	May 5, 2022 (Confirmed April 27, 2022, by voice vote)	January 20, 2025
Minnesota
U.S. Attorney for the District of Minnesota	Andrew M. Luger	March 30, 2022 (Confirmed March 24, 2022, 60–36)	January 15, 2025
Mississippi
U.S. Attorney for the S.D. of Mississippi	Todd Gee	October 4, 2023 (Confirmed September 29, 2023, 82–8)	January 17, 2025
Montana
U.S. Attorney for the District of Montana	Jesse Laslovich	June 2, 2022 (Confirmed May 17, 2022 by voice vote)	February 17, 2025
Nevada
U.S. Attorney for the District of Nevada	Jason Frierson	May 11, 2022 (Confirmed April 27, 2022, by voice vote)	January 17, 2025
New Hampshire
U.S. Attorney for the District of New Hampshire	Jane E. Young	May 2, 2022 (Confirmed April 27, 2022, by voice vote)	January 17, 2025
New Jersey
U.S. Attorney for the District of New Jersey	Philip R. Sellinger	December 16, 2021 (Confirmed December 7, 2021, by voice vote)	January 8, 2025
New Mexico
U.S. Attorney for the District of New Mexico	Alexander M.M. Uballez	May 24, 2022 (Confirmed May 17, 2022 by voice vote)	February 17, 2025
New York
U.S. Attorney for the E.D. of New York	Breon S. Peace	October 15, 2021 (Confirmed October 5, 2021, by voice vote)	January 10, 2025
U.S. Attorney for the N.D. of New York	Carla B. Freedman	October 8, 2021 (Confirmed October 5, 2021, by voice vote)	February 17, 2025
U.S. Attorney for the S.D. of New York	Damian Williams	October 10, 2021 (Confirmed October 5, 2021, by voice vote)	December 13, 2024
U.S. Attorney for the W.D. of New York	Trini E. Ross	October 11, 2021 (Confirmed September 30, 2021, by voice vote)	February 17, 2025
North Carolina
U.S. Attorney for the E.D. of North Carolina	Michael F. Easley Jr.	November 26, 2021 (Confirmed November 19, 2021, by voice vote)	February 3, 2025
U.S. Attorney for the M.D. of North Carolina	Sandra J. Hairston	November 23, 2021 (Confirmed November 19, 2021, by voice vote)	January 18, 2025
U.S. Attorney for the W.D. of North Carolina	Dena J. King	November 29, 2021 (Confirmed November 19, 2021, by voice vote)	February 12, 2025
North Dakota
U.S. Attorney for the District of North Dakota	Mac Schneider	December 12, 2022 (Confirmed December 6, 2022, by voice vote)	February 16, 2025
Ohio
U.S. Attorney for the S.D. of Ohio	Kenneth L. Parker	November 23, 2021 (Confirmed November 19, 2021, by voice vote)	February 18, 2025
Oregon
U.S. Attorney for the District of Oregon	Natalie K. Wight	September 12, 2022 (Confirmed September 8, 2022 by voice vote)	February 18, 2025
Pennsylvania
U.S. Attorney for the E.D. of Pennsylvania	Jacqueline C. Romero	June 21, 2022 (Confirmed June 13, 2022 by voice vote)	February 17, 2025
U.S. Attorney for the M.D. of Pennsylvania	Gerard Karam	June 21, 2022 (Confirmed June 13, 2022 by voice vote)	January 10, 2025.
U.S. Attorney for the W.D. of Pennsylvania
U.S. Attorney for the W.D. of Pennsylvania	Cindy K. Chung	November 23, 2021 (Confirmed November 19, 2021, by voice vote)	February 17, 2023
U.S. Attorney for the W.D. of Pennsylvania	Eric G. Olshan	June 12, 2023 (Confirmed June 8, 2023, by voice vote)	January 19, 2025
Rhode Island
U.S. Attorney for the District of Rhode Island	Zachary A. Cunha	December 13, 2021 (Confirmed December 7, 2021, by voice vote)	February 18, 2025
South Carolina
U.S. Attorney for the District of South Carolina	Adair Ford Boroughs	July 26, 2022 (Confirmed July 21, 2022 by voice vote)	February 18, 2025
Tennessee
U.S. Attorney for the M.D. of Tennessee	Henry C. Leventis	January 11, 2023 (Confirmed December 15, 2022 by voice vote)	October 4, 2024
U.S. Attorney for the W.D. of Tennessee	Kevin G. Ritz	September 28, 2022 (Confirmed September 22, 2022 by voice vote)	September 18, 2024
Texas
U.S. Attorney for the E.D. of Texas	Damien Diggs	May 7, 2023 (Confirmed May 4, 2023, by voice vote)	January 21, 2025
U.S. Attorney for the N.D. of Texas	Leigha Simonton	December 10, 2022 (Confirmed December 6, 2022, by voice vote)	January 19, 2025
U.S. Attorney for the S.D. of Texas	Alamdar S. Hamdani	December 12, 2022 (Confirmed December 6, 2022, by voice vote)	January 19, 2025
U.S. Attorney for the W.D. of Texas	Jaime E. Esparza	December 9, 2022 (Confirmed December 6, 2022, by voice vote)	February 18, 2025
Utah
U.S. Attorney for the District of Utah	Trina A. Higgins	May 4, 2022 (Confirmed April 27, 2022, by voice vote)	February 16, 2025
Vermont
U.S. Attorney for the District of Vermont	Nikolas P. Kerest	December 10, 2021 (Confirmed December 7, 2021, by voice vote)	January 20, 2025
Virgin Islands
U.S. Attorney for the Virgin Islands	Delia L. Smith	May 3, 2022 (Confirmed April 27, 2022, by voice vote)	April 14, 2025
Virginia
U.S. Attorney for the E.D. of Virginia	Jessica D. Aber	October 12, 2021 (Confirmed October 5, 2021, by voice vote)	January 20, 2025
U.S. Attorney for the W.D. of Virginia	Christopher R. Kavanaugh	October 7, 2021 (Confirmed October 5, 2021, by voice vote)	December 20, 2024
Washington
U.S. Attorney for the E.D. of Washington	Vanessa Waldref	October 7, 2021 (Confirmed September 30, 2021, by voice vote)	February 12, 2025
U.S. Attorney for the W.D. of Washington	Nicholas W. Brown	October 8, 2021 (Confirmed September 30, 2021, by voice vote)	June 21, 2023; Resigned to run for Attorney General of Washington
West Virginia
U.S. Attorney for the N.D. of West Virginia	William J. Ihlenfeld II	October 12, 2021 (Confirmed October 5, 2021, by voice vote)	January 20, 2025
U.S. Attorney for the S.D. of West Virginia	William S. Thompson	October 13, 2021 (Confirmed October 5, 2021, by voice vote)	March 3, 2025
Wisconsin
U.S. Attorney for the E.D. of Wisconsin	Gregory Haanstad	September 19, 2022 (Confirmed September 13, 2022 by voice vote)	February 17, 2025

== Withdrawn nominations ==
District	Nominee	Announced	Withdrawn	Notes
U.S. Attorney for the N.D. of Ohio	Marisa T. Darden	November 12, 2021	May 19, 2022	Withdrawn 3 weeks after confirmation by the U.S. Senate by voice vote on April 27, 2022.
U.S. Attorney for the W.D. of Wisconsin	Sopen Shah	June 6, 2022	January 3, 2023	Nomination expired
U.S. Attorney for the E.D. of Tennessee	Casey T. Arrowood	July 29, 2022	January 3, 2023	Nomination expired
U.S. Attorney for the N.D. of Ohio	Rebecca C. Lutzko	June 7, 2023	January 3, 2025	Nomination expired
U.S. Attorney for the N.D. of Illinois	April Perry	June 28, 2023	July 11, 2024	Nominated as a US District Judge to the U.S. District Court for the N.D. of Illinois
U.S. Attorney for the D. Guam and the D. N. Mar. I.	Johnny C. Gogo	October 18, 2023	January 3, 2025	Nomination expired
U.S. Attorney for the District of Massachusetts	Joshua S. Levy	October 18, 2023	January 3, 2025	Nomination expired
U.S. Attorney for the N.D. of Iowa	Matthew L. Gannon	February 21, 2024	January 3, 2025	Nomination expired
U.S. Attorney for the S.D. of Iowa	David Waterman	February 21, 2024	January 3, 2025	Nomination expired

== See also ==
- Cabinet of Joe Biden, for the vetting process undergone by top-level roles including advice and consent by the Senate
- Department of Justice appointments by Joe Biden

== Notes ==
Confirmation votes

Confirmations by roll call vote

Confirmations by voice vote
