= United States Attorney for the Middle District of Georgia =

Agency overview
- Formed: May 28, 1926 by 44 Stat. 670
- Jurisdiction: Middle District of Georgia
- Agency executive: William R. Kayes (acting)
- Parent department: United States Department of Justice
- Website: https://www.justice.gov/usao-mdga

U.S. District Courts for the Middle District of Georgia was created in 1926 by 44 Stat. 670. The first attorney was Bascom S. Denver.

== List of U.S. attorneys ==
- Bascom S. Deaver 1926-28
- Scott Russell 1928–29
- William A. Bootle 1929–33
- T. Hoyt Davis 1933–45
- John P. Cowart 1945–52
- Jack J. Gautier 1952–53
- Frank O. Evans 1953–61
- Floyd M. Buford 1961–69
- Walker P. Johnson Jr. 1969
- William J. Schloth 1969–74
- Ronald T. Knight 1974–77
- D. Lee Rampey Jr. 1977–81
- Joe D. Whitley 1981–87
- Samuel A. Wilson 1987–88
- Edgar William Ennis Jr. 1988–93
- Samuel A. Wilson Jr. 1993
- James L. Wiggins 1994–96
- H. Randolph Aderhold 1996–97
- Beverly Martin 1997-2000
- Maxwell Wood 2001–2010
- G. F. Pete Peterman, III 2010
- Michael J. Moore 2010–2015
- G.F. "Gate" Peterman, III 2015–2017
- Charles Peeler 2017–2020
- Peter D. Leary 2020–2025
