= Death of Kendrick Johnson =

2013 death in Georgia, United States

- Johnson, c. 2012
- Date: January 10, 2013 (death); January 11, 2013 (discovery)
- Venue: Gymnasium, Lowndes High School
- Location: Valdosta, Georgia, U.S.
- Cause: Disputed: Accidental, positional asphyxia (per first autopsy); Blunt force trauma (per second autopsy)
- Inquiries: U.S. Attorney (Middle District of Georgia); FBI
- Charges: None filed
- Litigation: Wrongful death lawsuits filed by Johnson's family against Lowndes County Board of Education, school officials, and other individuals accused of conspiracy; Counter-lawsuit by accused individuals

On January 11, 2013, the body of Kendrick Lamar Johnson (October 10, 1995 – January 10, 2013), an American high school student, was discovered inside a vertical rolled-up gym mat in the gymnasium of Lowndes High School, which he attended in Valdosta, Georgia. After a preliminary investigation and autopsy concluded that Johnson's death was accidental, his family had a private pathologist conduct a second autopsy, which concluded that he died from blunt force trauma. On October 31, 2013, the U.S. Attorney for the Middle District of Georgia announced that his office would open a formal review into Johnson's death. On June 20, 2016, the Department of Justice announced that it would not be filing any criminal charges related to Johnson's death.

Johnson's family filed a $100 million civil lawsuit against 38 individuals, stating that his death was a murder and that the respondents were participants in a conspiracy to cover up the homicide, which they claimed involved two sons of an FBI agent. That lawsuit was subsequently withdrawn. Georgia Judge Richard Porter ordered the Johnsons and their attorney to pay more than $292,000 in legal fees to the defendants, accusing them of fabricating evidence to support their claims.

== Death ==
Kendrick Johnson, a 17-year-old student at Lowndes High School in Valdosta, Georgia, was reported missing by his family on the evening of Thursday, January 10, 2013. The following morning, his body was discovered in the school's old gymnasium, positioned head down in the center of a vertical rolled-up wrestling mat. The body was discovered by fellow students who had climbed up to the top of a cluster of mats, which stood nearly 6 feet (1.8 m) tall and 3 feet (0.91 m) wide. News of Johnson's death appeared as early as January 14 in Georgia newspapers, and newspapers elsewhere via the Associated Press two days later.

== Initial investigation ==
An autopsy by the Georgia Bureau of Investigation (GBI) stated that Johnson had died from positional asphyxia, and the case was ruled an accidental death by the Lowndes County investigators. Authorities hypothesized that Johnson had fallen into the mat while looking for a shoe and died after being unable to get out. Three students at Lowndes High School told investigators that it was common for some students to store their shoes behind or under the rolled up mats; Johnson was not wearing shoes when he was found. A student at the school said that he shared a pair of Adidas shoes with Johnson, and that after gym class Johnson would always "go to the mats, jump up and toss the shoes inside the middle of the hole."

Lieutenant Stryde Jones, who headed up the investigation for the Lowndes County Sheriff's Office, stated: "We never had credible information that indicated this was anything other than an accident." Johnson's family questioned this hypothesis. Unsatisfied with the result of the investigation, they hired an independent autopsy conducted by William R. Anderson with Forensic Dimensions in Heathrow, Florida, on June 15, 2013. Anderson claimed that his findings indicated traces of blunt force trauma to the right neck and soft tissues, and suggested the death was not accidental.

== Subsequent events ==
After the opinion of the private pathologist was released, Johnson's family stated that they believed Johnson had been murdered. The family retained the services of attorney Benjamin Crump. On October 31, 2013, U.S. Attorney Michael J. Moore announced that his office would open a formal review into Johnson's death. Crump's application to practice law in Georgia representing Johnson's parents was not ruled on, and he withdrew from representing the family and ended his participation in the case.

Johnson's family filed a legal action to open a coroner's inquest into his death. When the judge in that case delayed a decision, pending the outcome of the U.S. Attorney's review, the family demanded that the governor of Georgia immediately authorize the inquiry instead. The family, together with the NAACP and other civil rights activists, then held a rally at the Georgia State Capitol in Atlanta. The governor's office released a statement indicating that they would await the report of the U.S. Attorney.

=== Johnson's Body ===
The independent autopsy found that some time after Johnson's body was recovered from the mat and had passed through a funeral home, it had been stuffed with newspapers. The funeral home that processed the body following the FBI's autopsy stated that they never received Johnson's internal organs from the coroner; the organs were said to have been "destroyed through natural process" and "discarded by the prosector before the body was sent back to Valdosta," according to the funeral home owner. That left a void, which the funeral home filled. The funeral home owner stated that it is standard practice to fill a void in this fashion, and that cotton or sawdust may also be employed for this purpose. Johnson's family filed a complaint with a regulatory body against the funeral home operator.

A subsequent investigation by the Georgia Secretary of State's office found that the funeral home did not follow "best practice" and that other material was "more acceptable than newspaper." Nonetheless, the investigation cleared the funeral home of any wrongdoing. A spokesperson for the Secretary of State said that the investigation found that the funeral home "...didn't violate any rules." The Johnson family subsequently filed a civil lawsuit against the funeral home, seeking monetary damages.

Johnson's family requested that his body be exhumed for a second time and was granted permission by Valdosta city officials. On June 22, 2018, Johnson's body was exhumed.

=== Surveillance tape ===
Surveillance footage of Johnson entering the gymnasium shortly before he died

In November 2013, 290 hours of surveillance tape from 35 cameras that covered the gym area were released to CNN following a court request. A forensic analyst enlisted by CNN found that tapes from two cameras were missing an hour and five minutes of footage, while another set was missing two hours and ten minutes of footage. Some of the apparent lapses in coverage were found to result from camera systems that were not synchronized with one another. Time stamps between some separate camera systems differed by as much as twenty minutes for the same time period, giving the impression of a gap for portions of the footage where no gap existed. Other missing footage was the result of the camera's motion-activated function not being triggered. Camera systems were motion-activated, using a change in light pixels to turn recordings on and off. The area where Johnson's body was discovered, where the gym mats were stored, was not covered by surveillance cameras.

Attorneys for the Johnson family expressed fears that the camera footage was edited as part of a cover-up. However, analysis of the camera systems by the Valdosta Daily Times attempted to explain the anomalies, casting doubt on the theory of a cover-up. The president of the Valdosta-Lowndes County chapter of the Southern Christian Leadership Conference and the former lead investigator for that chapter have stated that they believe the attorneys for the Johnsons have "not been entirely truthful in their statements" and that there was no cover-up in this case.

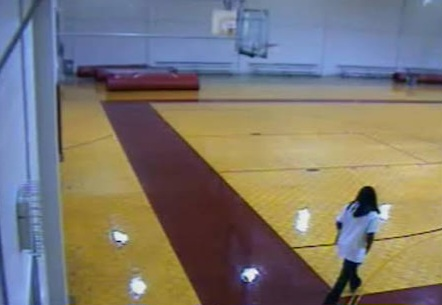
Kendrick Johnson in the gymnasium shortly before his death.

== Legal actions ==
Johnson's family filed a wrongful death lawsuit against Lowndes County Board of Education, its superintendent and the principal of Lowndes High School. The suit alleged that Johnson "was violently assaulted, severely injured, suffered great physical pain and mental anguish, and subjected to insult and loss of life" on January 10, 2013. While the lawsuit did not name the person or persons allegedly involved in the January 10 event, nor identify the race of alleged perpetrators, it implied a race-based dimension to the hypothetical assault. The lawsuit alleged that the defendants were negligent and violated Johnson's constitutional right to equal protection based on race. It alleged that the defendants ignored reports that, previously, Johnson had been repeatedly attacked and harassed by a white student. It alleged that Johnson was attacked on a bus trip 14 months prior to his death. The lawsuit further alleged that another student, Brian Bell, "had a history of provoking and attacking" Johnson at school, stating that the provocations took place "in the presence of the coaching staff and employees" after his mother complained about previous attacks. The suit also alleged that school officials failed to "properly monitor the activities of students throughout all areas" of the campus and to "maintain a properly functioning video surveillance system."

In August 2014, a $5 million lawsuit against Ebony magazine was filed, after the magazine published a series of articles naming two students as possible suspects in Johnson's death. The magazine used pseudonyms but was otherwise accurate in descriptions of the boys, including the fact that their father was an FBI agent. The article used as a source an anonymous email to the sheriff's office. In their lawsuit, the parents of the accused boys asserted that their sons were not involved in the death, were not considered suspects, and had been harassed as a result of the publication.

In January 2015, Johnson's family filed a $100 million civil lawsuit in the Superior Court of DeKalb County against 38 individuals. Respondents include three of Johnson's classmates (two or three respondents are unnamed) and local, state, and federal officials: the school superintendent of Lowndes County, the Valdosta-Lowndes crime lab, the police chief of Valdosta, many sheriff's deputies, the city of Valdosta, the state medical examiner, the GBI and five of its agents, and one FBI agent. The lawsuit alleged that the FBI agent ordered his two sons and a classmate to attack Johnson, that his death was a murder, and that the respondents engaged in a conspiracy to cover up the homicide. Jim Elliott, the Lowndes County Attorney, stated that the allegations were "unfounded" and "baseless" and that any response would be made in court. All local Superior Court judges recused themselves from presiding over the case, preventing the lawsuit from being filed and heard in Lowndes County, citing their close proximity to the accused.

Shortly before the lawsuit was filed, U.S. Attorney Michael J. Moore said in a statement that a federal investigation was still open and that "the investigation has proven more complicated and taken longer than originally anticipated." After Moore resigned in 2015, the case was transferred to the Northern District of Ohio under U.S. Attorney Steven Dettelbach. Shortly after receiving the case, Dettlebach also resigned. Despite these resignations, the Department of Justice investigation continued.

In November 2015, the Department of Justice filed a motion in the civil case to intervene and stay the case. The U.S. Attorney said allowing evidence discovery in the civil suit to continue would have a "chilling effect" on the federal investigation, which had expanded into investigating possible obstruction and grand jury witness tampering. After the Justice Department's motion was denied, Johnson's parents dismissed their own wrongful death lawsuit, saying that they hoped to refile it after the conclusion of the federal investigation. They were subsequently sued for more than $850,000 in attorney fees and $1,000,000 in defamation damages.

On June 20, 2016, the Department of Justice announced that they would not be filing any criminal charges related to Johnson's death, stating, "After extensive investigation into this tragic event, federal investigators determined that there is insufficient evidence to prove beyond a reasonable doubt that someone or some group of people willfully violated Kendrick Johnson's civil rights or committed any other prosecutable federal crime." On August 10, 2017, Georgia Judge Richard Porter ruled that Johnson's family and their attorney had to pay more than $292,000 in legal fees to the dozens of respondents in their civil suit, writing "testimony shows that they had no evidence to support their claims that the [brothers] killed Johnson or that any of the other defendants engaged in a conspiracy to conceal the cause or manner of Johnson's death."

On March 10, 2021, the case was officially reopened by Lowndes County Sheriff Ashley Paulk. Paulk put up a $500,000 reward — of his own cash — for information leading to the conviction of anyone who killed Kendrick Johnson. According to Paulk, he and two other investigators pored through the case for 13 months before coming to his conclusions. In January 2022, the second investigation was closed with no charges filed. Paulk released a finding saying "...there was no homicide, no coverup, no conspiracy in the January 2013 death of the teen. It was simply a tragic and bizarre accident." Paulk stated that he would not be claiming there was something wrong with the original investigation or that the original investigation's conclusion of an accidental death was wrong. The sheriff also stated he does not consider the case to be a homicide. He further stated that two brothers, named in previous legal actions by the Johnsons, are not suspects.

== Aftermath ==
=== Documentary ===
In 2021, a documentary called Finding Kendrick Johnson was made and it reexamined the case going in detail on what had happened. It criticised law enforcement's initial accidental death ruling, highlighted unredacted FBI files and gave alternate interpretations of the school surveillance footage.

== See also ==
- List of unusual deaths in the 21st century
