= Olshan (surname) =

Olshan is a surname. Notable people with the surname include:

- Eric G. Olshan, American lawyer
- Joseph Olshan, American novelist
- Yitzhak Olshan (1895–1983), Israeli jurist
