= Jim Hood =

American politician (born 1962)

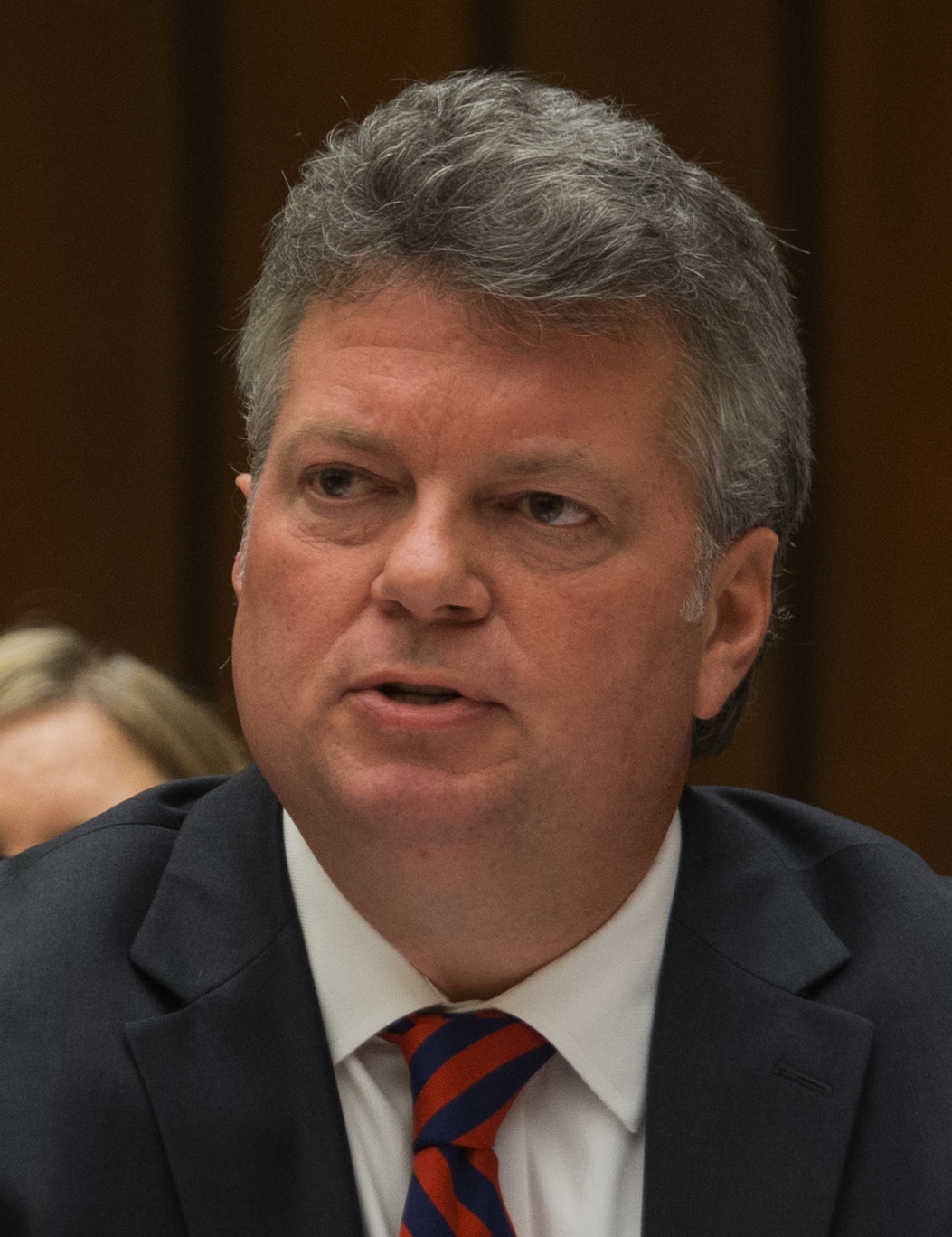

39th Attorney General of Mississippi
- In office January 8, 2004 – January 14, 2020
- Governor: Haley Barbour; Phil Bryant
- Preceded by: Mike Moore
- Succeeded by: Lynn Fitch

Personal details
- Born: James Matthew Hood; May 15, 1962 (age 64) New Houlka, Mississippi, U.S.
- Party: Democratic
- Spouse: Debra Hood
- Children: 3
- Education: University of Mississippi (BA, JD)

James Matthew Hood (born May 15, 1962) is an American lawyer and politician who served as the 39th attorney general of Mississippi from 2004 to 2020.

Hood was first elected Attorney General in 2003, defeating Republican Scott Newton. A former district attorney, Hood succeeded fellow Democrat Mike Moore. Hood announced on October 3, 2018, that he would run for Governor of Mississippi in 2019; he easily won the Democratic primary on August 6, 2019 but lost the general election to then-Lieutenant Governor Tate Reeves on November 5, 2019, which was Hood's first statewide loss. He was the last Democrat until Scott Colom in 2026 to win statewide office in Mississippi, and from 2008 to 2020 was the only one to do so.

Since leaving office, Hood has joined the national law firm Weisbrod Matteis & Copley, establishing the firm's first Mississippi-based office in Houston, Mississippi. He also sits on the bipartisan advisory board of States United Democracy Center.

== Early life and education ==
Hood is the son of James Hood, Jr. Hood is a native of New Houlka in Chickasaw County in northeastern Mississippi.

In 1988, Hood received his J.D. degree from the University of Mississippi at Oxford. As an undergraduate, he was a member of Pi Kappa Alpha.

== Attorney General ==
Hood was sworn-in as attorney general on January 8, 2004.

In 2004, Hood prosecuted Jeremy Martin, a teacher from Tupelo, Mississippi and unsuccessful Republican candidate for the Mississippi House of Representatives, who was accused of a misdemeanor campaign finance violation. John Helmert, Hood's opposing counsel, called the prosecution of Martin a "political witch hunt". According to the Sun Herald, "it is rare for the state's attorney general to prosecute alleged campaign finance violations." The case was dismissed after the defendant paid a $300 fine.

In 2005, Hood prosecuted former Klansman Edgar Ray Killen for orchestrating the 1964 murders of Andrew Goodman, Michael Schwerner, and James Chaney in Philadelphia, Mississippi during Freedom Summer.

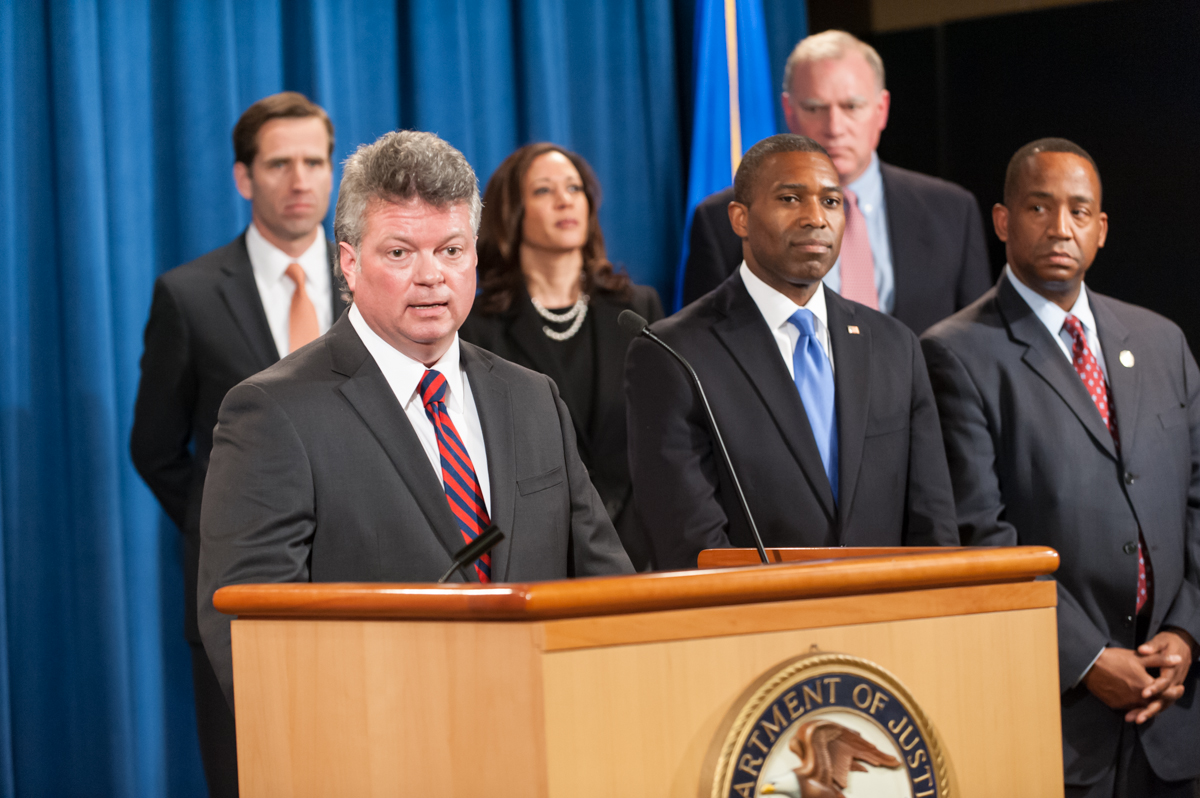
Jim Hood speaking at a Department of Justice event.

Hood has been active in the legal aspects of the recovery of Mississippi after Hurricane Katrina. Shortly after Katrina, Hood partnered with Mississippi plaintiff attorney Richard "Dickie" Scruggs, a brother-in-law of former U.S. senator Trent Lott, in filing suit against numerous high-profile insurance companies. Hood's leadership has been praised by some as allowing homeowners a better opportunity for recovery than they experienced in neighboring Louisiana, but Scruggs and Hood have also been criticized for over-zealously prosecuting insurance companies and because Scruggs helped convey confidential documents, which Hood used in a criminal probe, supposedly to pressure State Farm Insurance into settlement. Hood was reelected on November 6, 2007 and again for a third term on November 8, 2011. On November 3, 2015, Hood was reelected to a fourth term.

In 2008, Judge William Acker criticized Hood in a judicial opinion for his role in helping Scruggs commit civil contempt. Scruggs was later convicted in federal court of crimes committed during the post-Katrina litigation. The saga is recounted in the 2009 book, Kings of Tort.

As a prosecutor, Hood has tried more than 100 jury cases while serving as assistant state attorney general and as Chickasaw County district attorney (D.A.). He has successfully prosecuted several historic cases, including winning the conviction of Killen. As D.A., he successfully prosecuted death penalty cases, including one in which he originally won a conviction, and later, as Attorney General (A.G.), argued and won an appeal of the case before the United States Supreme Court. As A.G., Hood established a vulnerable adults unit, a domestic violence unit, an identity theft unit, and a crime prevention and victims services division. He has launched initiatives to prevent workplace and school violence, and stalking and domestic assault. Hood has developed and distributed numerous publications to assist and educate both consumers and other public service entities in areas such as cyber crime, consumer protection, domestic violence, victims' assistance, election, and government law.

=== Forensics ===
Hood has been criticized for his support for the controversial bite mark technique and more generally for his opposition to reform of the Mississippi death investigation system and critical evaluation of questionable forensic techniques.

=== Pardons ===
On his last day as governor in 2012, Haley Barbour granted 208 pardons, clemency or early release for people convicted of crimes including murder, rape and armed robbery. Barbour's actions included 19 people convicted of murder. Pardons by governors are not uncommon; the issue in this case is the number of pardons compared to former governors. Gov. Ronnie Musgrove, whom Barbour succeeded as governor, issued only one pardon, for a man convicted of marijuana possession; Gov. Kirk Fordice, who preceded Musgrove, issued two full pardons for convicted murderers. In his role as attorney general, Hood argued Section 124 of the Mississippi Constitution says any inmate seeking a pardon must publish their intentions 30 days in a newspaper in or near the county where the person was convicted and on January 11, a Mississippi judge temporarily blocked the release of the 21 inmates who had been given pardons or medical release.

=== Notable lawsuits ===
==== 2017 Hurricane Katrina insurance lawsuits ====
In May 2017, twelve years after Hurricane Katrina, Hood filed lawsuits against Liberty Mutual Insurance and Safeco Insurance claiming that the companies failed to make adequate payments for the victims of Katrina.

Hurricane Katrina occurred in August 2005 and caused $125 billion in property damage within Mississippi.

The lawsuits claim that the insurance companies "undervalued claims for Katrina winded damages to minimize payments and to foist the financial burden onto the state when adjusting homeowners' insurance claims in the wake of the hurricane." Part of the complaint read, "Liberty Mutual essentially converted a program designed to help Mississippians recovering from Katrina into a subsidy for itself."

==== Pharmaceutical companies ====
In 2017, Hood filed lawsuits against a number of pharmaceutical companies. In the lawsuits, Hood alleged that the companies were engaging in an unlawful scheme to "force the state to pay for drugs that were not eligible for Medicaid reimbursement." Overall, Hood filed six separate lawsuits against the 18 defendant companies.

Among other things, the lawsuits claimed that the companies made the state of Mississippi pay for drugs that had not received approval by the FDA. According to Legal NewsLine, "Hood contends the companies' scheme involves false representations, made by the defendants to the state, that their National Drug Codes, or NDCs, are FDA approved and eligible for Medicaid reimbursement."

Hood said that the allegedly fraudulent marketing of drugs by the defendant companies resulted in an increased market share and profits for the companies while "essentially leaving the state in a lurch."

==== Department of Corrections corruption ====
On February 8, 2017, Hood announced he had filed civil cases against numerous corporations and individuals who had allegedly engaged in corrupt contracts with the Mississippi Department of Corrections and its former commissioner Chris Epps, seeking damages and punitive damages. He stated, "The state of Mississippi has been defrauded through a pattern of bribery, kickbacks, misrepresentations, fraud, concealment, money laundering and other wrongful conduct." He continued, "These individuals and corporations that benefited by stealing from taxpayers must not only pay the state's losses, but state law requires that they must also forfeit and return the entire amount of the contracts paid by the state. We are also seeking punitive damages to punish these conspirators and to deter those who might consider giving or receiving kickbacks in the future." Besides Teresa Malone and Carl Reddix, who had been indicted by the U.S. attorney for the Southern District of Mississippi, the civil case defendants included previously uncharged Michael Reddix; Utah's Management & Training Corporation; Florida's GEO Group, Inc.; Cornell Companies, Inc.; Wexford Health Sources, Inc.; Drug Testing Corporation; Global Tel*Link Corporation and Sentinel Offender Services, L.L.C. and others. As he left office, Hood published a list of enumerated recoveries of $26,612,188.22 from complicit corporations. The settlement amounts paid by these government contractors and the nature of services they provided were as follows: (1) Management & Training Corporation $5.18 million For-profit operator of correctional facilities (2) Cornell Companies, Inc. (GEO Group) $4.55 million For-profit operator of correctional facilities (3) Wexford Health Sources, Inc. $4.00 million Correctional health care provider (4) Keefe Commissary Network, LLC $3.10 million Commissary management services (5) C. N. W. Construction Company $3.10 million Construction (6) Global Tel*Link Corporation $2.50 million Inmate telephone communications (7) Branan Medical Corporation $2.00 million “Drugs-of-abuse” testing products (8) Sentinel Offender Services, LLC $1.30 million Offender tracking and monitoring provider (9) CGL Facility Management, LLC $750,000.00 Correctional maintenance services (10) AdminPros, LLC $32,188.22 Medicaid eligibility services (11) Guy E. “Butch” Evans $100,000.00 Insurance (12) Health Assurance, LLC ($0 due to bankruptcy) Correctional health care provider.

== Google investigation ==
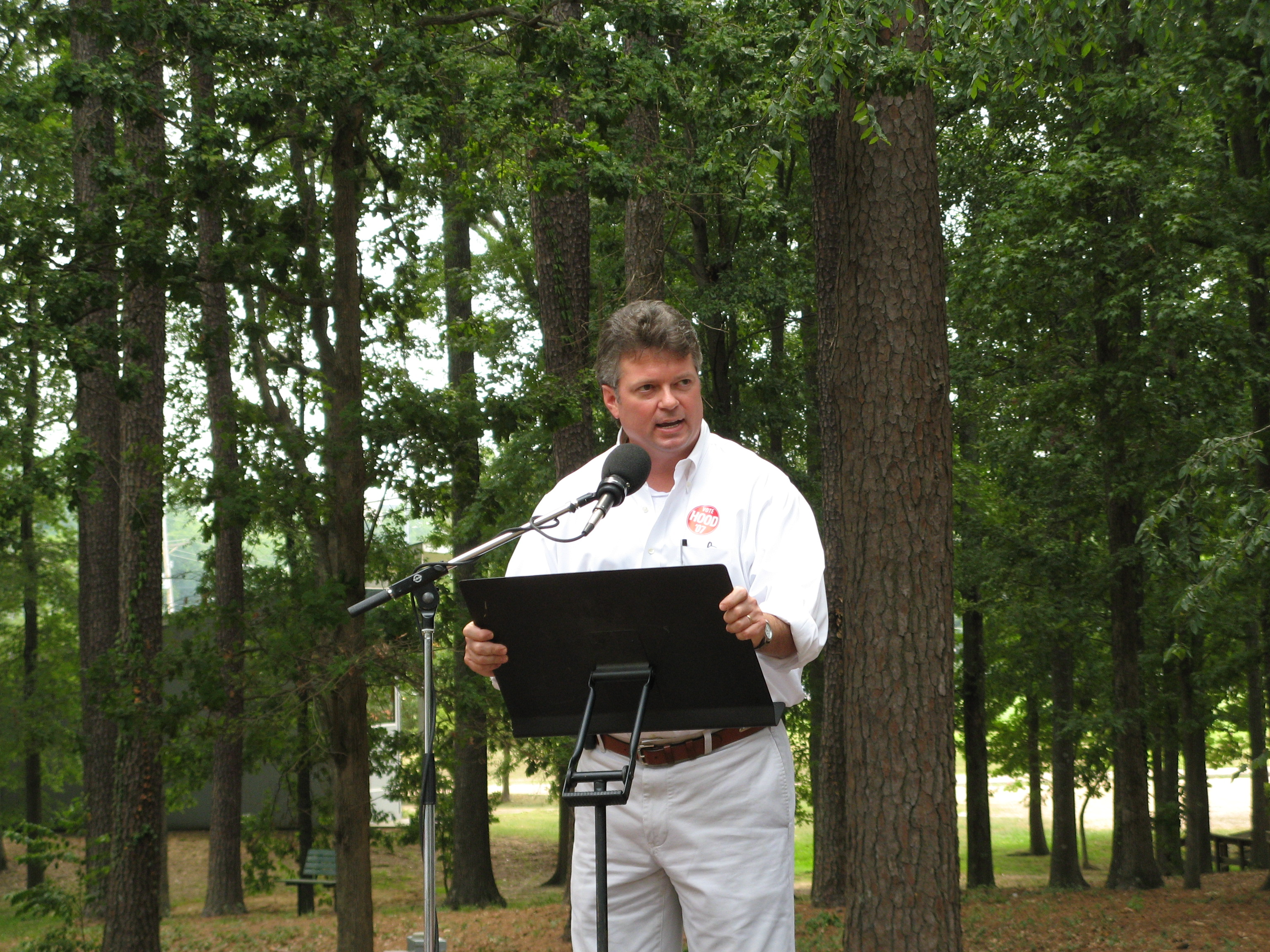
Jim Hood in 2007.

Working with the National Association of Attorneys General and entertainment lobby groups, Hood has been pushing Google since 2013 to prevent use of the company's search engine to find drugs that require a prescription and copyright infringing content. In December 2014, Google sued Hood in federal court, seeking to block a 79-page subpoena from the attorney general for violating First and Fourth Amendments rights. The attorney general filed a motion to dismiss Google's motion on January 12, 2015. Both parties later agreed to freeze their motions and not enforce the subpoena until March 6, 2015. A U.S. district judge granted Google's request for a preliminary injunction on March 2, 2015 putting on hold the pending subpoena and ordering Attorney General Hood to hand over information requested by Google. An appeals court has overturned the preliminary injunction on procedural grounds and allowed the subpoena, though it also criticized the broad nature Hood's original subpoena and the lack of any specific associated investigation. In July 2016, Google and Hood agreed to dismiss their respective lawsuits and subpoenas. The Attorney General and Google agreed to "endeavor to collaborate in addressing the harmful consequences of unlawful and/or dangerous online content".

On December 19, 2014, as a result of the Sony Pictures Entertainment hack, emails were released that showed that Hood was urged by the Motion Picture Association of America (MPAA) to blame Google for acts of copyright infringement committed by numerous, multiple unrelated third parties via the trade organisations the Digital Citizens Alliance and FairSearch. The released emails also showed that threatening communications from Hood's office to Google were written by MPAA counsel.

The subject sued Google for education privacy violations in 2017 and joined other Attorneys General investigating Facebook's policies on user privacy by sending a letter to preserve information that might be legal evidence in a future lawsuit.

== 2019 gubernatorial campaign ==
On October 3, 2018, Hood announced that he would be a candidate for Governor of Mississippi in 2019. According to the Jackson Free Press, Hood, "known for his conservative positions on criminal justice... laid out a progressive policy agenda on taxes, health care, education and infrastructure" when he announced his candidacy. Hood campaigned as a moderate Democrat according to an NPR reporter. Mississippi's The Clarion Ledger reported that "Hood portrays himself" as a moderate.

In announcing his candidacy, Hood called for Medicaid expansion, tuition-free community college, universal pre-school, and criticized corporate tax cuts implemented by Mississippi's Republican-controlled legislature. According to Hood, the decision by Republicans not to accept Medicaid expansion had contributed to the closure of rural hospitals in Mississippi. He has also campaigned based on what he describes as his anti-abortion views and has highlighted his gun ownership. Explaining his anti-abortion position, he referred to his work defending Mississippi's ban, known as a "heartbeat" bill, on abortions after eight weeks of pregnancy.

Hood won the Democratic primary with 68.78% of the vote. He lost the general election to Republican nominee Tate Reeves, the incumbent lieutenant governor. Reeves defeated Hood in the general election by a margin of 5.1%, making it the nearest a Democrat had come to winning a Mississippi gubernatorial election since 1999. Hood had managed the strongest performance by a Democrat since the 2003 Mississippi gubernatorial election, when then-incumbent governor Ronnie Musgrove took 45.81% of the vote as he lost reelection.

== Electoral history ==
2003 Mississippi Attorney General election
| Party | Candidate | Votes | % |
|---|---|---|---|
| Democratic | Jim Hood | 548,046 | 62.69% |
| Republican | Scott Newton | 326,042 | 37.30% |
| Total votes | | 874,088 | 100.00% |
| Democratic hold | | | |

2007 Mississippi Attorney General election
| Party | Candidate | Votes | % |
|---|---|---|---|
| Democratic | Jim Hood (incumbent) | 439,668 | 59.8% |
| Republican | Al Hopkins | 295,791 | 40.2% |
| Total votes | | 735,459 | 100.0% |
| Democratic hold | | | |

2011 Mississippi Attorney General election
| Party | Candidate | Votes | % |
|---|---|---|---|
| Democratic | Jim Hood (incumbent) | 536,827 | 61.08% |
| Republican | Steve Simpson | 342,086 | 38.92% |
| Total votes | | 878,913 | 100.00% |
| Democratic hold | | | |

2015 Mississippi Attorney General election
| Party | Candidate | Votes | % |
|---|---|---|---|
| Democratic | Jim Hood (incumbent) | 395,969 | 55.29% |
| Republican | Mike Hurst | 320,192 | 44.71% |
| Total votes | | 716,161 | 100.00% |
| Democratic hold | | | |

2019 Mississippi gubernatorial election
| Party | Candidate | Votes | % | ±% |
|---|---|---|---|---|
| Republican | Tate Reeves | 459,396 | 51.91% | −14.47 |
| Democratic | Jim Hood | 414,368 | 46.83% | +14.58% |
| Independent | David Singletary | 8,522 | 0.96% | N/A |
| Constitution | Bob Hickingbottom | 2,625 | 0.30% | N/A |
| Total votes | | 884,911 | 100% | |
| Republican hold | | | | |

== Sources ==
- Mississippi Official and Statistical Register 2004–2008. Jackson: Mississippi Secretary of State. 2005.
- Mississippi Official and Statistical Register 2008–2012 (PDF). Jackson: Mississippi Secretary of State. 2009.

Legal offices
| Preceded by Mike Moore | Attorney General of Mississippi; 2004–2020 | Succeeded by Lynn Fitch |
Party political offices
| Preceded by Mike Moore | Democratic nominee for Attorney General of Mississippi; 2003, 2007, 2011, 2015 | Succeeded by Jennifer Riley Collins |
| Preceded by Robert Gray | Democratic nominee for Governor of Mississippi; 2019 | Succeeded by Brandon Presley |
