= D. Michael Hurst Jr. =

American attorney

Mike Hurst
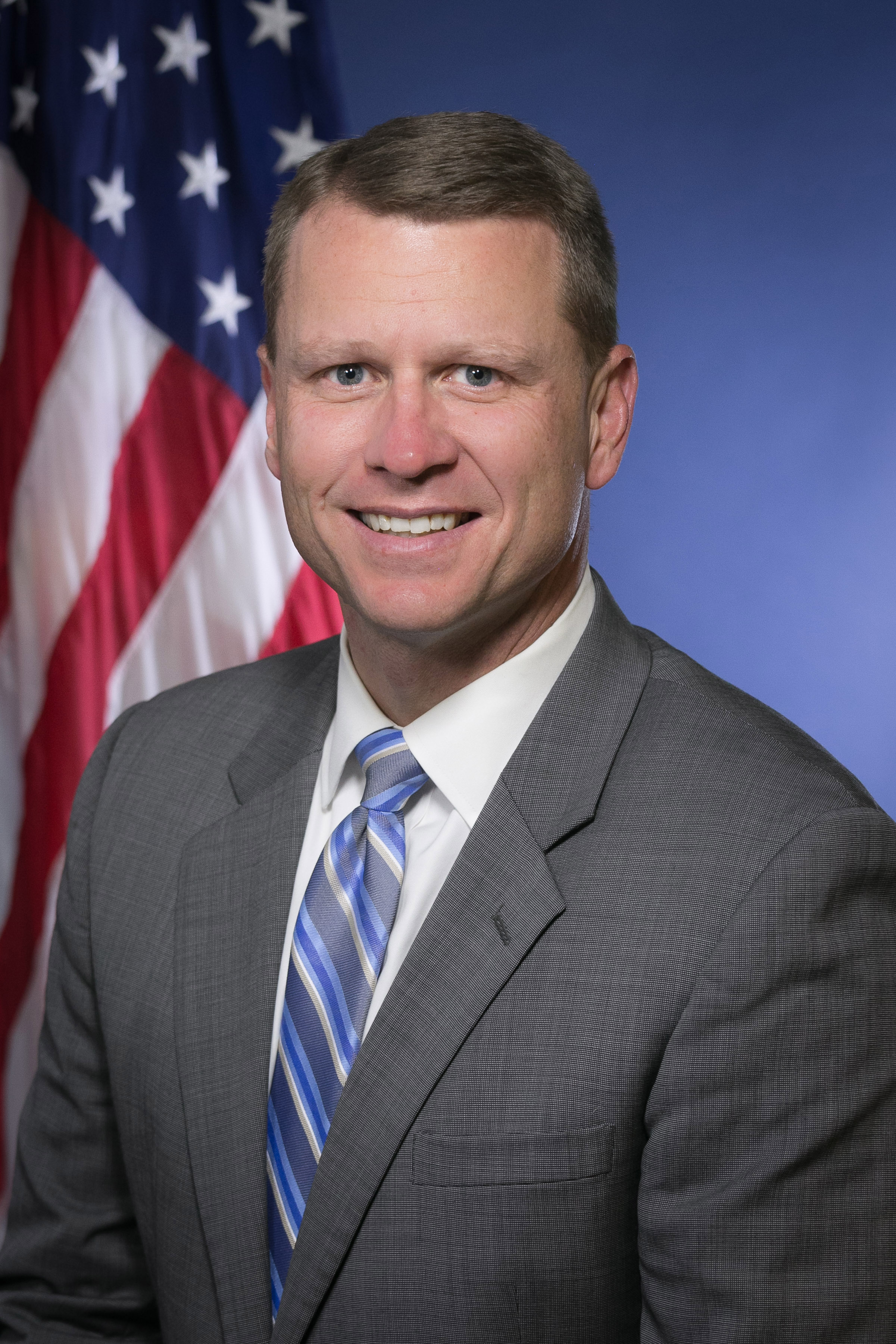

Chair of the Mississippi Republican Party
- Incumbent
- Assumed office May 13, 2024
- Preceded by: Frank Bordeaux

United States Attorney for the Southern District of Mississippi
- In office October 10, 2017 – January 19, 2021
- President: Donald Trump
- Preceded by: Gregory K. Davis
- Succeeded by: Todd Gee

Personal details
- Born: David Michael Hurst Jr. 1975 or 1976 (age 50–51) Hickory, Mississippi, U.S.
- Party: Republican
- Spouse: Celeste Hurst
- Education: East Central Community College (AA); Millsaps College (BA); George Washington University (JD)

David Michael Hurst Jr. (born 1975/1976) is an American attorney who currently serves as the general counsel of the Republican National Committee, chair of the Mississippi Republican Party, and a partner at Phelps Dunbar, LLP. He served as the United States attorney for the United States District Court for the Southern District of Mississippi from 2017 to 2021. Before assuming that role, he was the director of the Mississippi Justice Institute and general counsel for the Mississippi Center for Public Policy. Hurst served as an Assistant United States Attorney in the Southern District of Mississippi, as legislative director and counsel to Congressman Chip Pickering, and as counsel to the Constitution Subcommittee of the United States House Committee on the Judiciary. Hurst ran for Attorney General of Mississippi in 2015, losing to Democratic incumbent Jim Hood.

In May 2019, the Jackson, Mississippi city council awarded a resolution to Hurst for his role in apprehending the murderer of Brittany Green, who was shot and killed at a gas station.

In August 2019, Hurst announced immigration raids in Mississippi that he said were "the largest single state immigration enforcement operation in our nation's history." The workers faced charges including illegal reentry, misuse of Social Security numbers, impersonation of U.S. citizens, and other identity crimes.

On January 7, 2021, Hurst announced his resignation, effective January 19, 2021.

On May 11, 2024, Hurst was named chair of the Mississippi Republican party.

On October 8, 2025, Hurst was elected general counsel of the Republican National Committee.

He is married to Celeste Hurst, state representative for the 75th district.

Party political offices
Preceded by Stephen Simpson	Republican nominee for Attorney General of Mississippi; 2015	Succeeded by Lynn Fitch
Preceded by Frank Bordeaux	Chair of the Mississippi Republican Party; 2024–present	Incumbent
