= Henry C. Leventis =

American lawyer (born 1974)

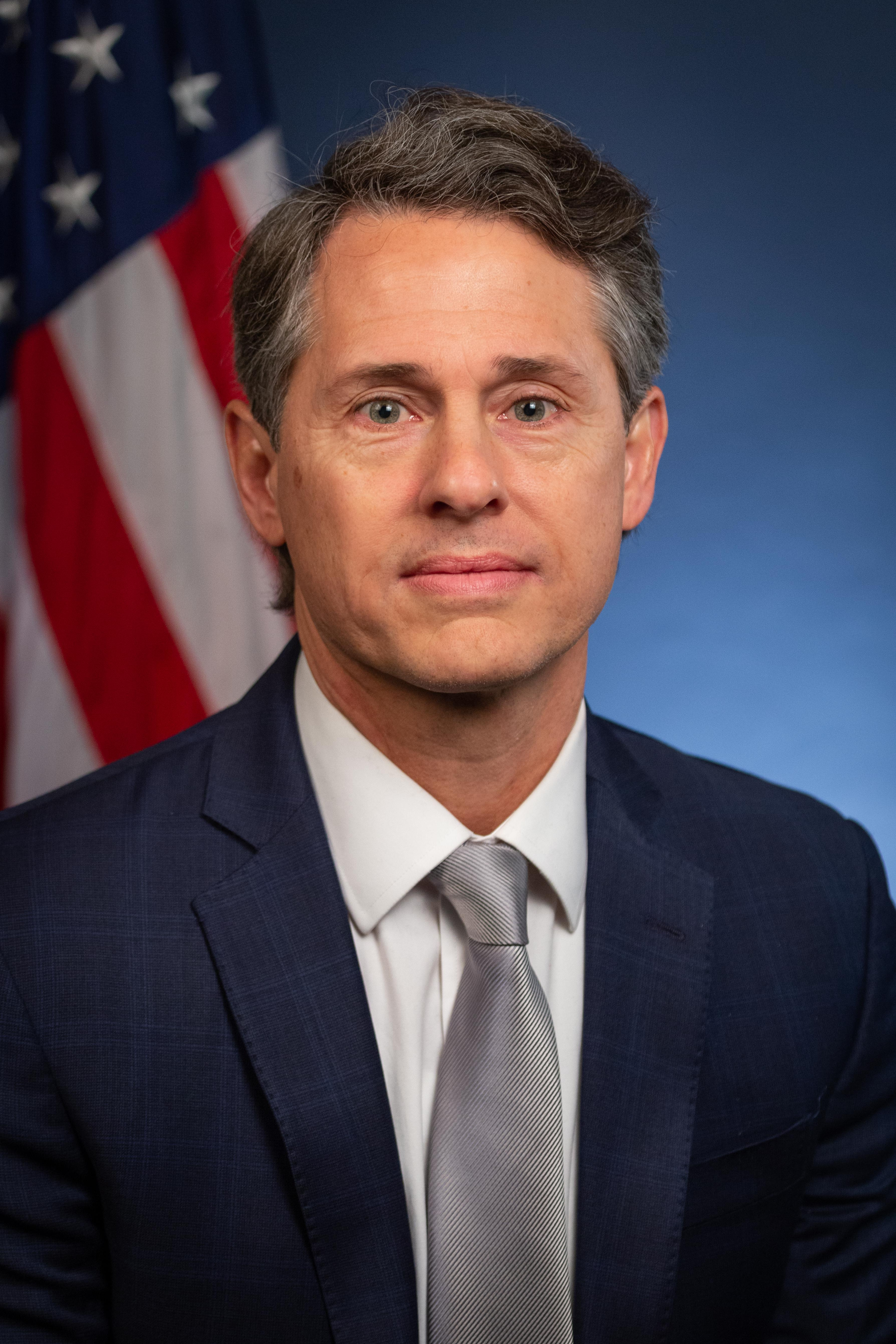

United States Attorney for the Middle District of Tennessee
- In office December 21, 2022 – October 4, 2024
- Appointed by: Joe Biden
- Preceded by: Donald Q. Cochran
- Succeeded by: Thomas J. Jaworski (acting)

Personal details
- Born: Henry Cabell Leventis; August 5, 1974 (age 52) Houston, Texas, U.S.
- Education: College of Charleston (BA); Washington and Lee University (JD)

Henry Cabell Leventis (born August 5, 1974) is an American lawyer who served as the United States attorney for the Middle District of Tennessee from 2022 to 2024.

== Early life and education ==
Leventis was born on August 5, 1974, in Houston. He received a Bachelor of Arts from the College of Charleston in 1997 and a Juris Doctor from Washington and Lee University School of Law in 2003.

== Career ==
From 2003 to 2005 and again from 2008 to 2010, Leventis served as assistant solicitor in the Ninth Circuit Solicitor's office in Charleston, South Carolina. From 2005 to 2007, he was as an associate with Motley Rice in Mount Pleasant. From 2010 to 2015, he served as a trial attorney in the Criminal Section of the Civil Rights Division of the United States Department of Justice. From 2015 to 2020, Leventis served as an assistant United States attorney in the United States Attorney's Office for the Middle District of Tennessee. From 2020 to 2022, he was a partner at the law firm Spencer Fane LLP

=== U.S. attorney for the Middle District of Tennessee ===
On July 29, 2022, President Joe Biden announced his intent to nominate Leventis to be the United States attorney for the Middle District of Tennessee. On August 1, 2022 his nomination was sent to the United States Senate. On December 8, 2022, his nomination was reported out of committee by a voice vote, with Senator Josh Hawley voting "nay" on record. On December 15, 2022, the Senate confirmed his nomination by voice vote. On September 16, 2024, Leventis announced his intent to resign from the office of U.S. Attorney to return to private practice.

Legal offices
Preceded by Donald Q. Cochran; Mark H. Wildasin; Acting	United States Attorney for the Middle District of Tennessee; 2022–2024	Succeeded by Thomas J. Jaworski; Acting
