= Damien Diggs =

American attorney

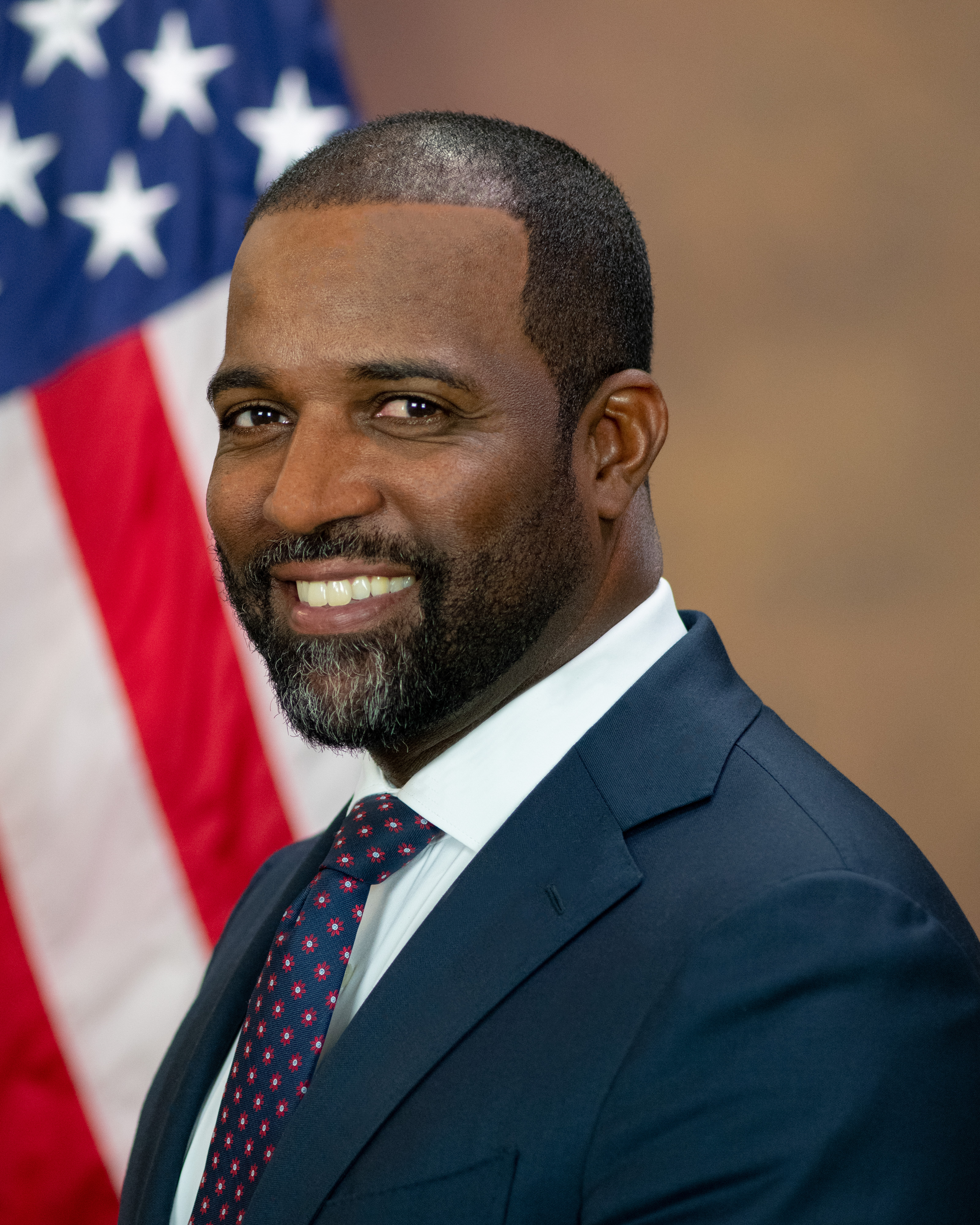

United States Attorney for the Eastern District of Texas
- Incumbent
- Assumed office May 7, 2023
- President: Joe Biden
- Preceded by: Brit Featherston

Personal details
- Born: 1975 or 1976 (age 50–51)
- Education: Towson University (BS); American University (JD)

Damien Diggs (born 1975/1976) is an American lawyer serving as United States attorney for the Eastern District of Texas since May 2023.

== Education ==
Diggs earned a Bachelor of Science degree in political science and government from Towson University in 1998 and a Juris Doctor from the Washington College of Law at American University in 2003.

== Career ==
In 2003 and 2004, Diggs served as a law clerk for Judge Rhonda Reid Winston on the Superior Court of the District of Columbia. From 2005 to 2007, he worked as an associate at Hogan Lovells in Washington, D.C. Diggs served as a staff attorney in the United States Department of Education's Office for Civil Rights from 2007 to 2012. Diggs served as an assistant United States attorney in Washington D.C., from 2012 to 2018 and joined the Northern District of Texas in 2018.

=== U.S. attorney for the Eastern District of Texas ===
In August 2022, Diggs was seen as a leading contender to be the U.S. attorney for the Eastern District of Texas. In October 2022, Senator Ted Cruz noted that Diggs was allegedly snubbed by the Biden administration when he was not nominated alongside other U.S. attorney nominees for the various Texas districts. On February 1, 2023, President Joe Biden announced his intent to nominate Diggs to serve as the United States attorney for the Eastern District of Texas. On February 2, 2023, his nomination was sent to the United States Senate. On March 9, 2023, his nomination was reported out of committee by voice vote. On May 4, 2023, the Senate confirmed his nomination by a voice vote. He was sworn in by Chief Judge J. Rodney Gilstrap on May 7, 2023. He is the first African-American to serve as U.S. attorney in the Eastern District of Texas.
