= Todd Gee =

American lawyer

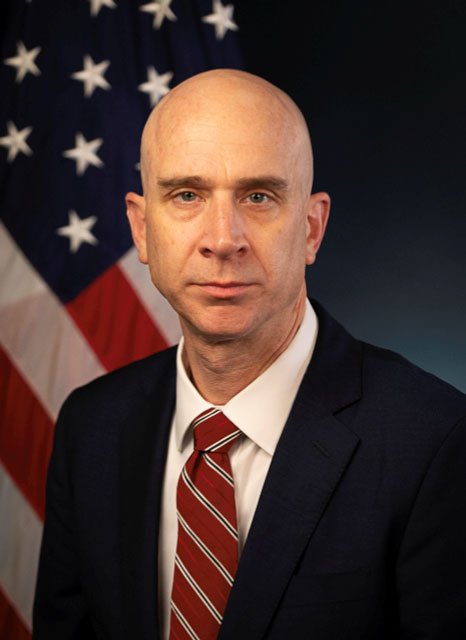

United States Attorney for the Southern District of Mississippi
- In office October 4, 2023 – January 18, 2025
- President: Joe Biden
- Preceded by: D. Michael Hurst Jr.
- Succeeded by: Patrick Lemon (acting)

Personal details
- Education: George Washington University (BA); Tulane University (JD)

Todd Gee is an American lawyer who served as the United States attorney for the Southern District of Mississippi from 2023 to 2025.

== Education ==
Gee was born in Vicksburg, Mississippi. He earned a Bachelor of Arts from George Washington University in 1999 and a Juris Doctor from the Tulane University Law School in 2003.

== Career ==
From 2003 to 2005, Gee served as a law clerk for Magistrate Judge Janice M. Stewart of the United States District Court for the District of Oregon. Gee served as senior policy advisor for the United States House Committee on Homeland Security from 2005 to 2006 and chief counsel from 2006 to 2007. From 2007 to 2015, he served as an assistant United States attorney for the United States District Court for the District of Columbia. From 2018 to 2023, he served as deputy chief of the Public Integrity Section in the United States Department of Justice. As of January 26, 2022, he was assisting in the investigation into allegations of sex trafficking and obstruction of justice concerning Florida Congressman Matt Gaetz.

=== U.S. attorney for the Southern District of Mississippi ===
On September 2, 2022, President Joe Biden announced his intent to nominate Gee to be the United States attorney for the Southern District of Mississippi. On September 6, 2022 his nomination was sent to the United States Senate. On January 3, 2023, his nomination was returned to the president under Rule XXXI, Paragraph 6 of the United States Senate. He was renominated on January 23, 2023. On April 20, 2023, his nomination was reported out of committee by voice vote, with Senators Ted Cruz and Josh Hawley voting "no" on record. On September 29, 2023, the Senate confirmed his nomination by an 82–8 vote. He was sworn into office on October 4, 2023.
