= Gregory K. Davis =

American lawyer (born 1962)

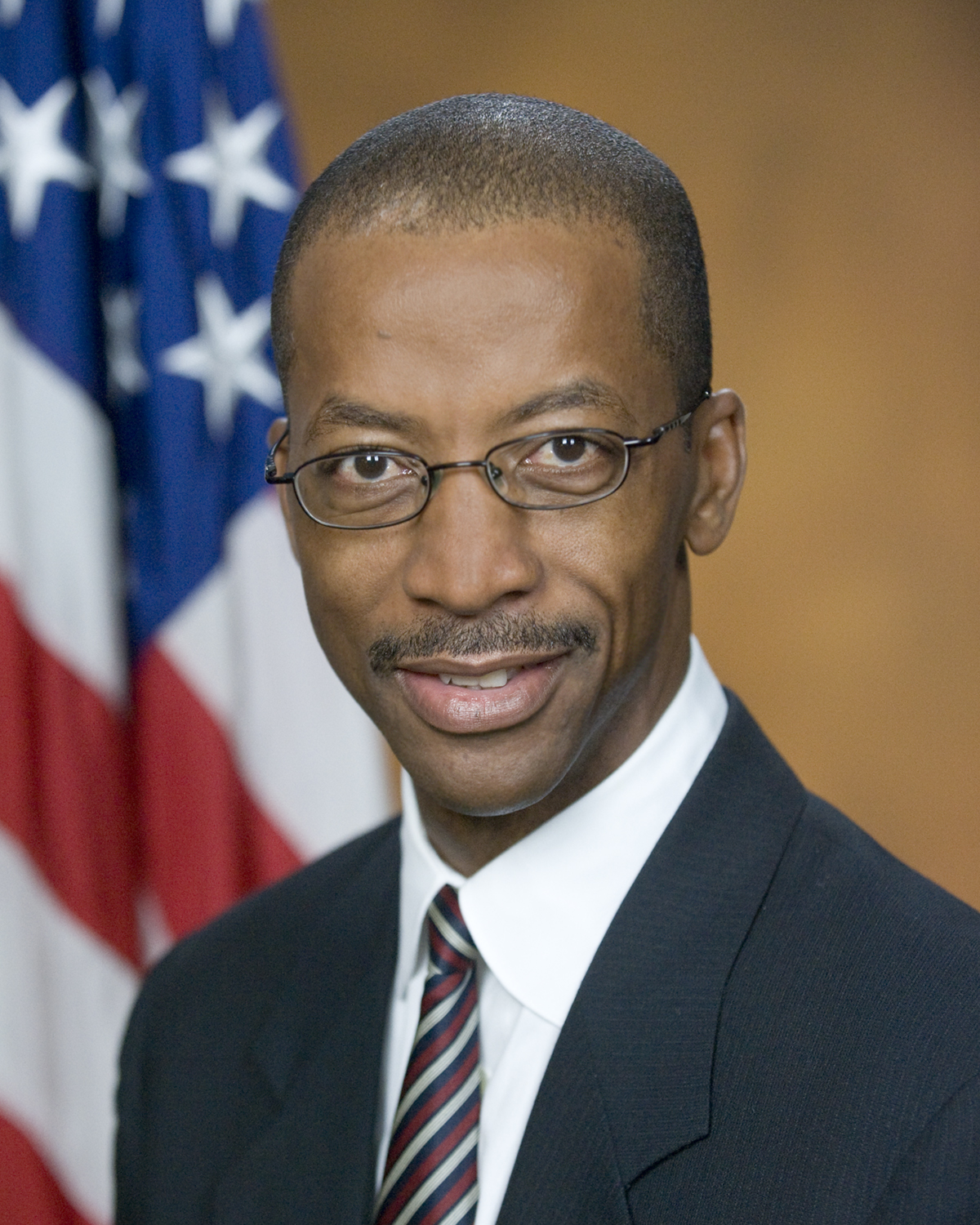

United States Attorney for the Southern District of Mississippi
- In office April 11, 2012 – March 10, 2017
- President: Barack Obama; Donald Trump
- Preceded by: John Dowdy (acting)
- Succeeded by: Mike Hurst

Personal details
- Born: May 10, 1962 (age 64)
- Party: Democratic
- Education: Mississippi State University (BS); Tulane University (JD)

Gregory K. Davis (born May 10, 1962) is an American attorney who served as the United States attorney for the Southern District of Mississippi from 2012 to 2017.

== Education ==
Davis graduated with a Bachelor of Science from Mississippi State University in 1984 and with a Juris Doctor from Tulane University School of Law in 1987.

== Career ==
From 1987 to 1989, Davis was an associate attorney for the law firm Stamps & Stamps. From 1989 to 2012, he was a member of the law firm Davis, Goss & Williams, PLLC; a firm which he co-founded.

=== U.S. attorney for Southern Mississippi ===
On June 29, 2011, President Barack Obama nominated Davis to be the United States attorney for the Southern District of Mississippi. On March 29, 2012, the United States Senate confirmed his nomination by voice vote. He was sworn into office on April 11, 2012.

== See also ==
- 2017 dismissal of U.S. attorneys
