= Tara McGrath =

American lawyer

Tara K. McGrath
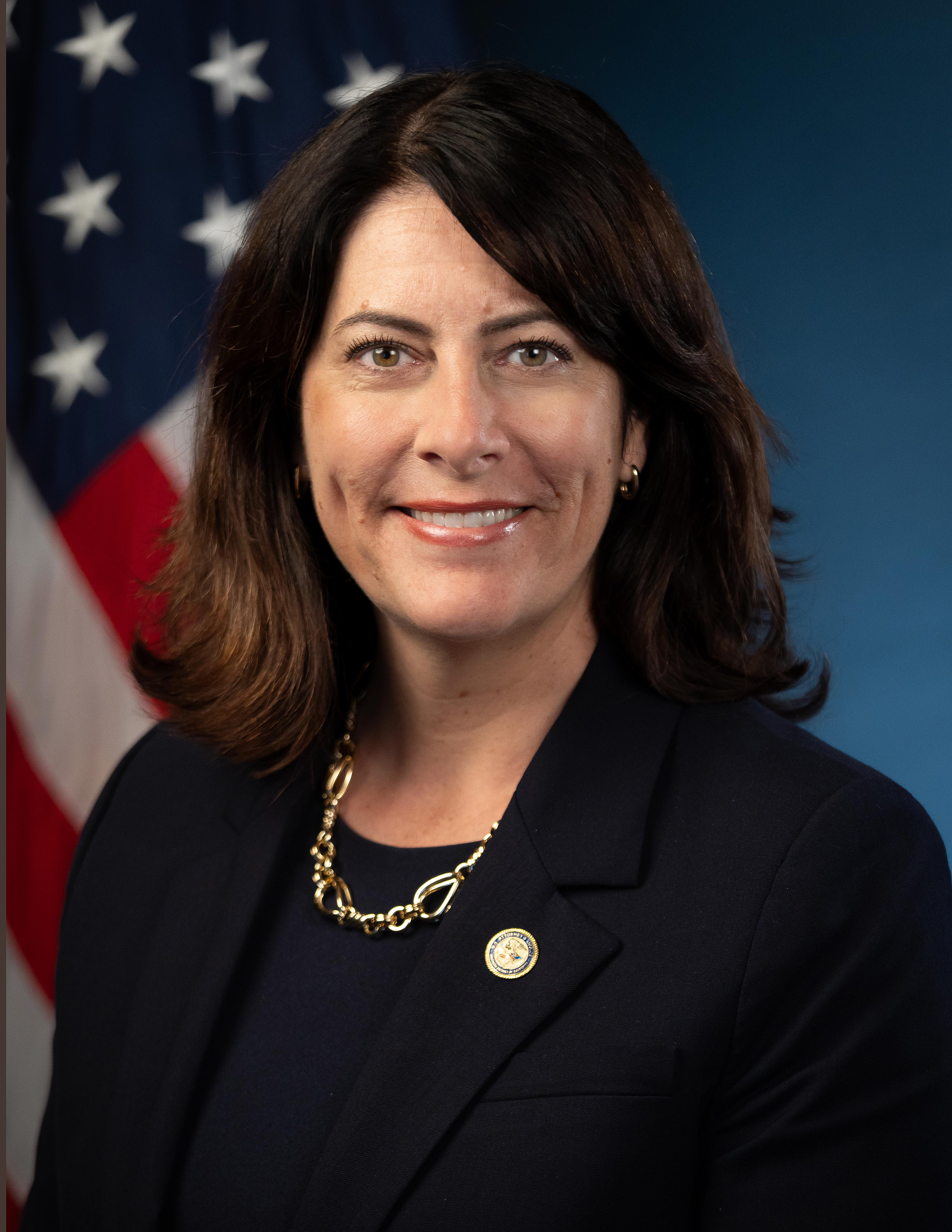

United States Attorney for the Southern District of California
- In office October 5, 2023 – February 12, 2025
- President: Joe Biden; Donald Trump
- Preceded by: Randy Grossman (acting)
- Succeeded by: Andrew R. Haden (acting)

Personal details
- Education: Boston College (BA); University of Michigan (JD)

Tara K. McGrath is an American lawyer who served as the United States attorney for the Southern District of California from October 2023 to February 2025.

== Education ==
McGrath received a Bachelor of Arts from Boston College, cum laude, in 1995 and a Juris Doctor from the University of Michigan Law School in 2001. She was admitted to the State Bar of California in 2007.

== Career ==
McGrath served as a judge advocate while on active duty in the United States Marine Corps from 2001 to 2005 and worked for the Coastal Conservation League from 2005 to 2007. From 2008 to 2019, she served as an assistant United States attorney in the U.S. Attorney's Office for the Southern District of California where she was principal deputy chief of the General Crimes Section in 2015 and a deputy chief in the General Crimes Section from 2012 to 2014. From 2015 to 2018, she served as a trial attorney in the Office of Enforcement Operations of the Criminal Division of the U.S. Department of Justice.

=== U.S. attorney for the Southern District of California ===
On March 20, 2023, President Joe Biden announced his intent to nominate McGrath to be the United States attorney for the Southern District of California. On March 21, 2023, her nomination was sent to the United States Senate. On July 13, 2023, her nomination was reported out of the committee by voice vote, with Senators Ted Cruz, Josh Hawley, John Kennedy, Mike Lee, and Marsha Blackburn voting no on record. On September 29, 2023, the United States Senate confirmed her by a 52–37 vote. She was sworn into office on October 5, 2023. She was dismissed from her position on February 12, 2025.

Legal offices
Preceded by Randy Grossman; Acting	United States Attorney for the Southern District of California; 2023–2025	Succeeded by Andrew R. Haden; Acting
