= Vanessa R. Avery =

American lawyer (born 1974 or 1975)

Vanessa Roberts Avery
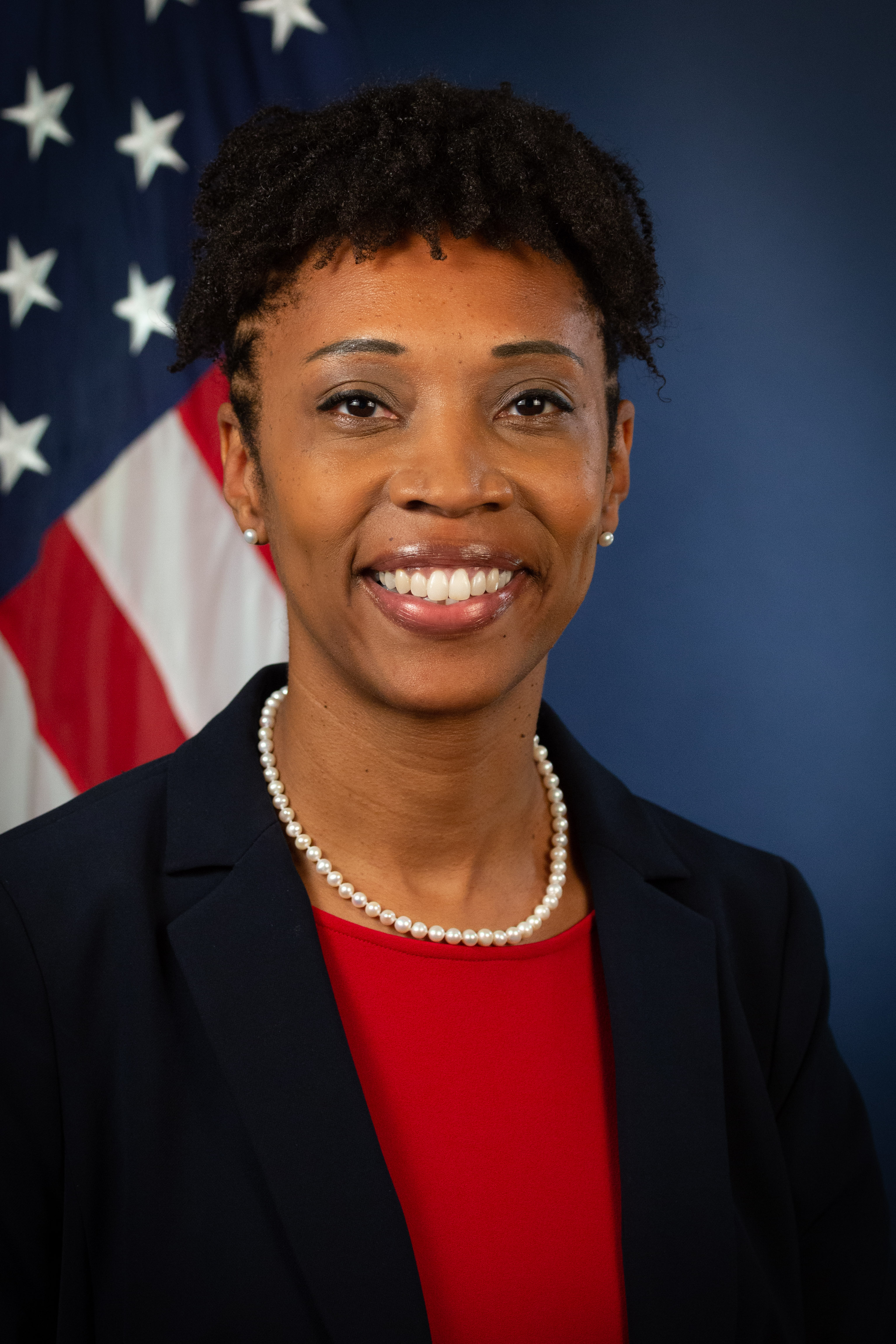

United States Attorney for the District of Connecticut
- In office May 9, 2022 – January 17, 2025
- President: Joe Biden
- Preceded by: John Durham
- Succeeded by: Marc H. Silverman (acting)

Personal details
- Born: 1974 or 1975 (age 51–52)
- Education: Yale University (BA); Georgetown University (JD)

Vanessa Roberts Avery (born 1974 or 1975) is an American lawyer who served as the United States attorney for the District of Connecticut from 2022 to 2025.

== Education ==
Avery received a Bachelor of Arts from Yale University in 1996 and a Juris Doctor from Georgetown University Law Center in 1999.

== Career ==
From 1999 to 2003, Avery was an attorney in the Hartford Trial Group at Cummings & Lockwood LLC. From 2004 to 2005, she served as a trial attorney at the United States Department of Justice in the Commercial Litigation Branch of the Civil Division. From 2006 to 2014, she was a litigation attorney at McCarter & English. From 2014 to 2019, she served as an Assistant United States Attorney in the United States Attorney's Office for the District of Connecticut. From 2019 to 2022, she served as an associate attorney general in the Connecticut Attorney General's Office and as chief of the division of enforcement and public protection from 2021 to 2022.

=== U.S. attorney for the District of Connecticut ===
On January 26, 2022, President Joe Biden announced his intent to nominate Avery to be the United States Attorney for the District of Connecticut. Her nomination earned the praise of Connecticut Attorney General William Tong. On January 31, 2022, her nomination was sent to the United States Senate. On April 4, 2022, her nomination was favorably reported out of the Senate Judiciary Committee. On April 27, 2022, her nomination was confirmed in the Senate by voice vote. She became the first African-American woman to serve as U.S. Attorney for the District of Connecticut. She was sworn in on May 9, 2022. She resigned on January 17, 2025.

Legal offices
Preceded by John Durham	United States Attorney for the District of Connecticut; 2022–2025	Succeeded by Marc H. Silverman; Acting
