= Dawn N. Ison =

American lawyer (born 1963)

Dawn Ison
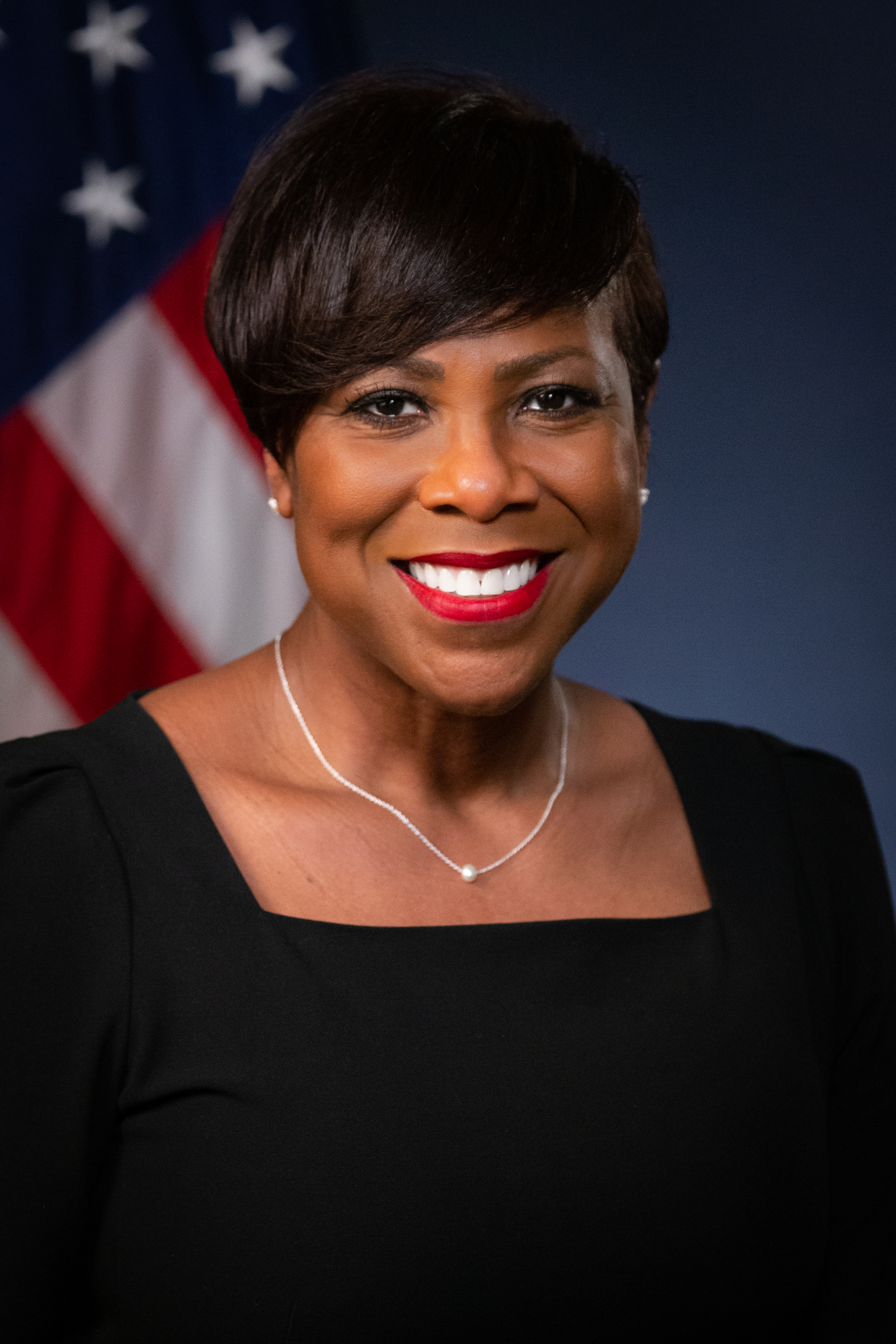

United States Attorney for the Eastern District of Michigan
- In office December 21, 2021 – January 19, 2025
- President: Joe Biden
- Preceded by: Matthew J. Schneider
- Succeeded by: Julie A. Beck

Personal details
- Born: Dawn Noelle Ison; 1963 (age 62–63) Detroit, Michigan, U.S.
- Education: Spelman College (BA); Wayne State University (JD)

Dawn Noelle Ison (born 1963) is an American lawyer who was the United States attorney for the Eastern District of Michigan.

== Education ==
Ison earned a Bachelor of Arts from Spelman College in 1986 and a Juris Doctor from the Wayne State University Law School in 1989.

== Career ==
In 1989 and 1990, Ison was a prehearing attorney for the Michigan Court of Appeals. In 2002, Ison began serving as an assistant United States attorney in the United States Attorney's Office for the Eastern District of Michigan. She also served as chief of the Drug Enforcement Task Force Unit.

=== United States attorney for the Eastern District of Michigan ===
On November 12, 2021, President Biden nominated Ison to be the United States Attorney for the Eastern District of Michigan. She was reported out favorably by the Senate Judiciary Committee on December 9, 2021, and was confirmed by the Senate on December 14, 2021. She was sworn into office on December 21, 2021.

On January 19, 2025, Ison resigned.
