= Celeste Hurst =

American politician

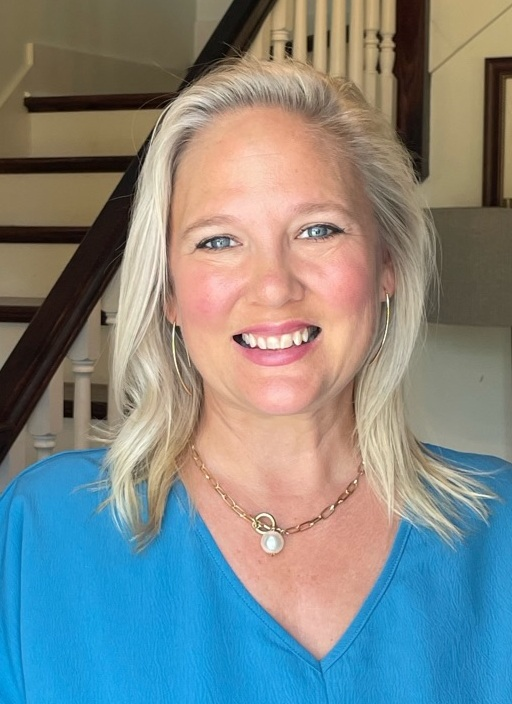
- Hurst in 2023

Member of the Mississippi House of Representatives from the 75th district
- Incumbent
- Assumed office January 2, 2024
- Preceded by: Tom Miles

Personal details
- Born: August 31, 1976 (age 50) Lauderdale, Mississippi
- Education: East Central Community College; Belhaven University
- Occupation: Politician, nonprofit ministry

Celeste Hurst serves as a member of the Mississippi House of Representatives for the 75th District, affiliating with the Republican Party, a position she has held since 2024.

She is married to Mike Hurst, former U.S. attorney and current chair of the Mississippi GOP.
