= 2015 Mississippi Attorney General election =

- November 3, 2015
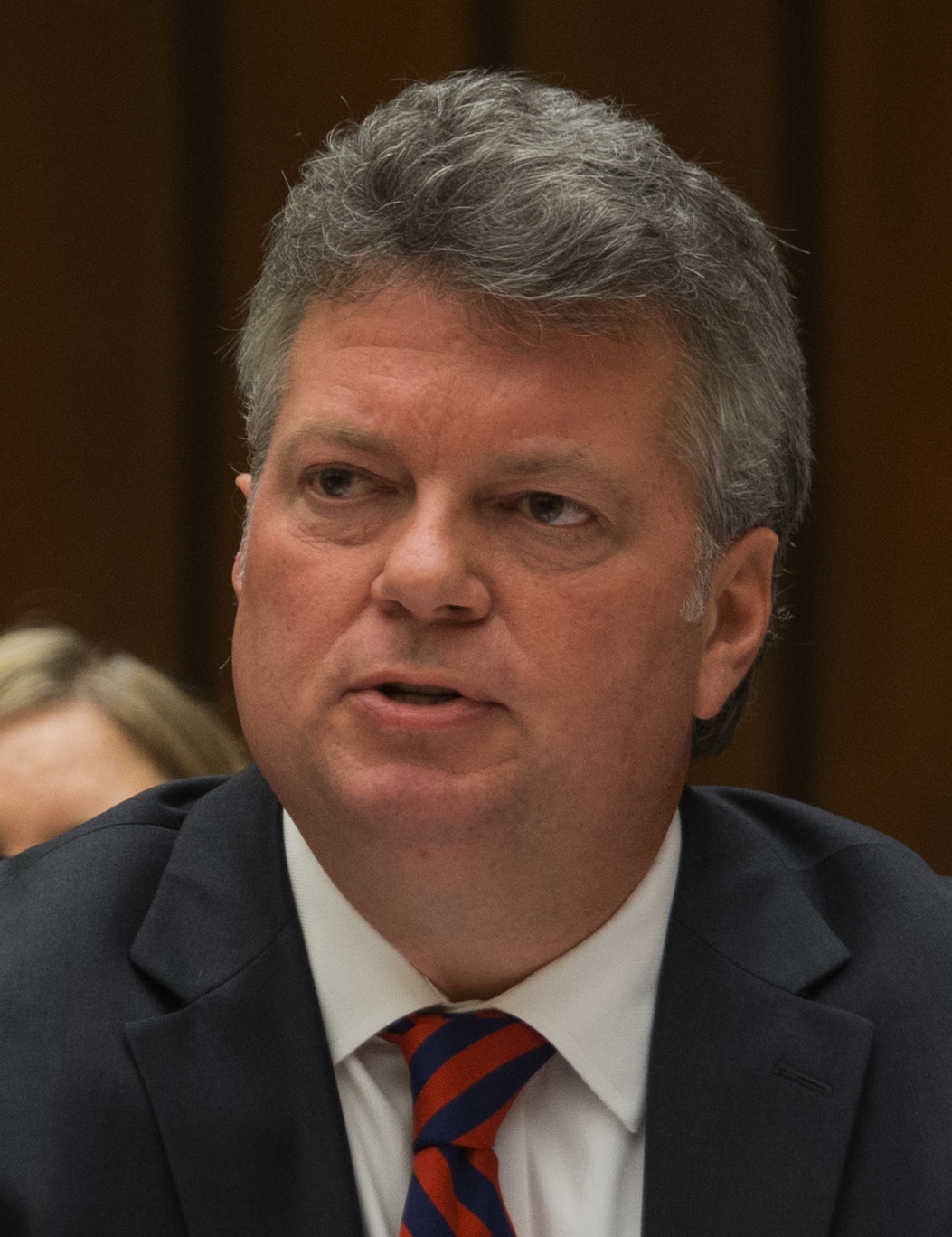

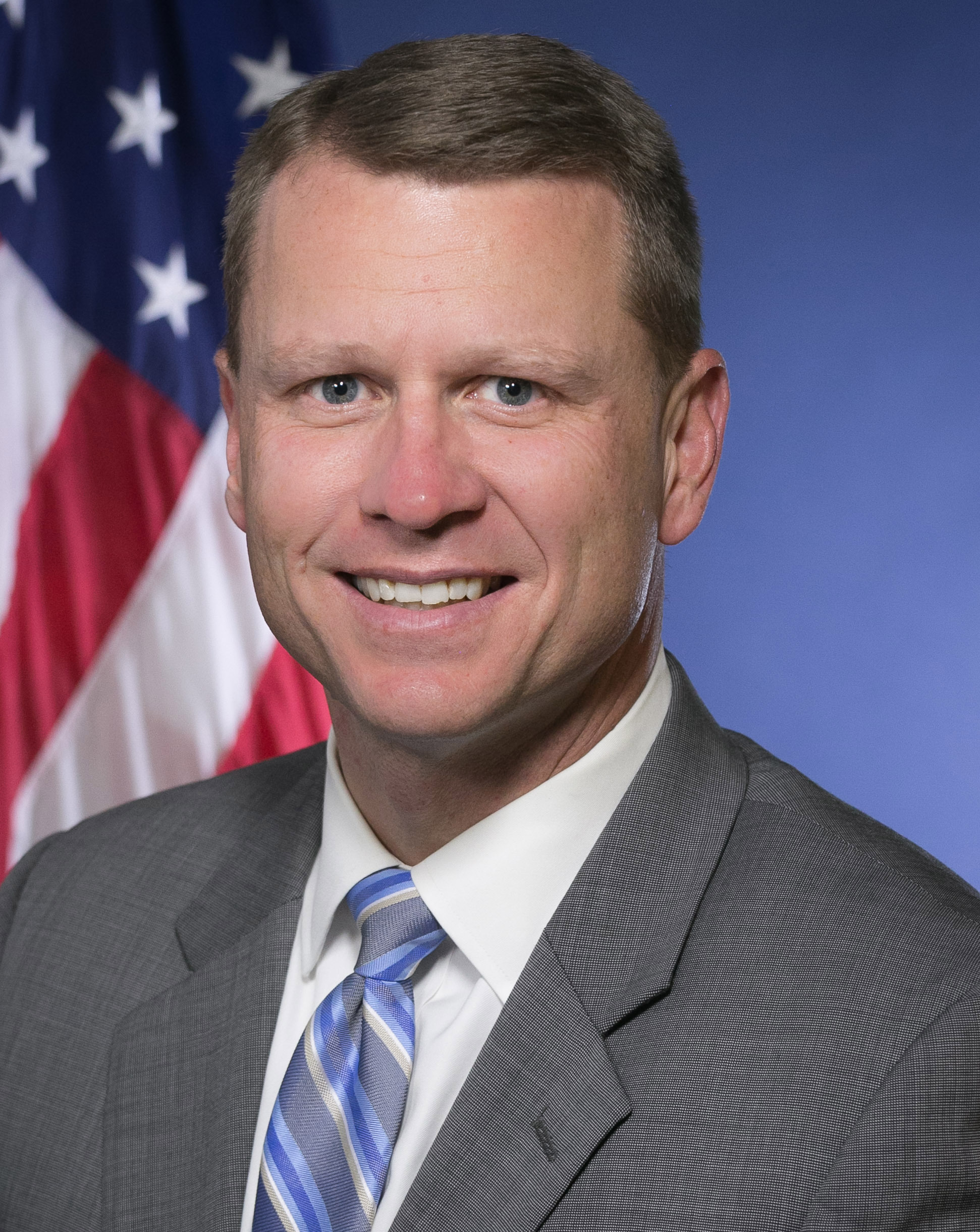
Nominee	Jim Hood	Mike Hurst
Party	Democratic	Republican
Popular vote	400,110	322,648
Percentage	55.36%	44.64%
- Hood: 50–60% 60–70% 70–80% 80–90% >90% Hurst: 50–60% 60–70% 70–80% 80–90% Tie: 50%
Attorney General before election
Jim Hood
Democratic
Elected Attorney General
Jim Hood
Democratic

The 2015 Mississippi Attorney General election was held on November 3, 2015. Incumbent Democrat Jim Hood, who had been the only statewide elected Democrat in Mississippi since 2008, sought and won reelection to a fourth term. Until the 2026 U.S. Senate election, this was the last time a Democrat won a statewide election in Mississippi.

== Primaries ==
=== Democratic nomination ===
==== Candidate ====
- Jim Hood, incumbent

=== Republican primary ===
==== Candidate ====
- Mike Hurst, Assistant U.S. Attorney

==== Results ====
Republican primary results
Party	Candidate	Votes	%
Republican	Mike Hurst	217,201	100.00%
Total votes		217,201	100.00%

== General election ==
=== Predictions ===
Source	Ranking
Governing	Tossup

=== Results ===
State house district results

2015 Mississippi Attorney General election
Party	Candidate	Votes	%
Democratic	Jim Hood (incumbent)	400,110	55.36%
Republican	Mike Hurst	322,648	44.64%
Total votes		722,758	100.00%
Democratic hold			

==== By county ====
County	Jim Hood Democratic		Mike Hurst Republican		Margin		Total
County	#	%	#	%	#	%	Total
Adams	5,046	68.36%	2,336	31.64%	2,710	36.71%	7,382
Alcorn	5,273	50.66%	5,136	49.34%	137	1.32%	10,409
Amite	2,838	56.41%	2,193	43.59%	645	12.82%	5,031
Attala	3,043	60.01%	2,028	39.99%	1,015	20.02%	5,071
Benton	1,721	62.74%	1,022	37.26%	699	25.48%	2,743
Bolivar	7,177	77.18%	2,122	22.82%	5,055	54.36%	9,299
Calhoun	3,122	60.77%	2,015	39.23%	1,107	21.55%	5,137
Carroll	2,226	54.96%	1,824	45.04%	402	9.93%	4,050
Chickasaw	4,530	78.77%	1,221	21.23%	3,309	57.54%	5,751
Choctaw	1,424	51.04%	1,366	48.96%	58	2.08%	2,790
Claiborne	3,093	88.45%	404	11.55%	2,689	76.89%	3,497
Clarke	3,150	53.58%	2,729	46.42%	421	7.16%	5,879
Clay	5,180	71.83%	2,031	28.17%	3,149	43.67%	7,211
Coahoma	2,977	75.67%	957	24.33%	2,020	51.35%	3,934
Copiah	4,960	67.53%	2,385	32.47%	2,575	35.06%	7,345
Covington	3,527	55.61%	2,815	44.39%	712	11.23%	6,342
DeSoto	6,656	31.70%	14,344	68.30%	-7,688	-36.61%	21,000
Forrest	8,871	51.59%	8,323	48.41%	548	3.19%	17,194
Franklin	1,846	60.45%	1,208	39.55%	638	20.89%	3,054
George	2,155	35.83%	3,860	64.17%	-1,705	-28.35%	6,015
Greene	1,701	44.53%	2,119	55.47%	-418	-10.94%	3,820
Grenada	4,150	61.08%	2,644	38.92%	1,506	22.17%	6,794
Hancock	3,340	39.74%	5,065	60.26%	-1,725	-20.52%	8,405
Harrison	14,802	47.69%	16,235	52.31%	-1,433	-4.62%	31,037
Hinds	43,464	75.20%	14,335	24.80%	29,129	50.40%	57,799
Holmes	4,275	85.93%	700	14.07%	3,575	71.86%	4,975
Humphreys	2,058	78.19%	574	21.81%	1,484	56.38%	2,632
Issaquena	404	71.00%	165	29.00%	239	42.00%	569
Itawamba	3,712	53.72%	3,198	46.28%	514	7.44%	6,910
Jackson	10,139	41.13%	14,515	58.87%	-4,376	-17.75%	24,654
Jasper	4,073	64.36%	2,255	35.64%	1,818	28.73%	6,328
Jefferson	2,487	91.00%	246	9.00%	2,241	82.00%	2,733
Jefferson Davis	2,900	71.06%	1,181	28.94%	1,719	42.12%	4,081
Jones	7,242	41.40%	10,251	58.60%	-3,009	-17.20%	17,493
Kemper	2,830	74.73%	957	25.27%	1,873	49.46%	3,787
Lafayette	5,835	53.05%	5,164	46.95%	671	6.10%	10,999
Lamar	4,696	34.48%	8,923	65.52%	-4,227	-31.04%	13,619
Lauderdale	8,819	51.95%	8,157	48.05%	662	3.90%	16,976
Lawrence	2,788	57.26%	2,081	42.74%	707	14.52%	4,869
Leake	3,344	55.64%	2,666	44.36%	678	11.28%	6,010
Lee	9,626	49.68%	9,749	50.32%	-123	-0.63%	19,375
Leflore	5,127	73.79%	1,821	26.21%	3,306	47.58%	6,948
Lincoln	5,029	48.58%	5,324	51.42%	-295	-2.85%	10,353
Lowndes	10,241	58.52%	7,258	41.48%	2,983	17.05%	17,499
Madison	12,744	46.26%	14,802	53.74%	-2,058	-7.47%	27,546
Marion	3,237	43.29%	4,240	56.71%	-1,003	-13.41%	7,477
Marshall	4,290	66.76%	2,136	33.24%	2,154	33.52%	6,426
Monroe	6,328	59.38%	4,329	40.62%	1,999	18.76%	10,657
Montgomery	2,296	59.65%	1,553	40.35%	743	19.30%	3,849
Neshoba	3,153	43.23%	4,140	56.77%	-987	-13.53%	7,293
Newton	2,486	36.32%	4,359	63.68%	-1,873	-27.36%	6,845
Noxubee	2,817	80.81%	669	19.19%	2,148	61.62%	3,486
Oktibbeha	6,494	57.91%	4,720	42.09%	1,774	15.82%	11,214
Panola	7,030	63.55%	4,033	36.45%	2,997	27.09%	11,063
Pearl River	2,798	30.76%	6,299	69.24%	-3,501	-38.49%	9,097
Perry	2,086	52.20%	1,910	47.80%	176	4.40%	3,996
Pike	7,270	61.37%	4,576	38.63%	2,694	22.74%	11,846
Pontotoc	4,548	54.53%	3,793	45.47%	755	9.05%	8,341
Prentiss	3,507	54.30%	2,951	45.70%	556	8.61%	6,458
Quitman	2,069	74.96%	691	25.04%	1,378	49.93%	2,760
Rankin	12,590	37.03%	21,410	62.97%	-8,820	-25.94%	34,000
Scott	4,128	58.03%	2,985	41.97%	1,143	16.07%	7,113
Sharkey	1,337	79.39%	347	20.61%	990	58.79%	1,684
Simpson	4,126	53.07%	3,649	46.93%	477	6.14%	7,775
Smith	2,855	49.85%	2,872	50.15%	-17	-0.30%	5,727
Stone	2,358	45.22%	2,857	54.78%	-499	-9.57%	5,215
Sunflower	4,406	76.96%	1,319	23.04%	3,087	53.92%	5,725
Tallahatchie	2,575	71.51%	1,026	28.49%	1,549	43.02%	3,601
Tate	3,046	50.74%	2,957	49.26%	89	1.48%	6,003
Tippah	3,225	50.23%	3,196	49.77%	29	0.45%	6,421
Tishomingo	3,217	48.46%	3,421	51.54%	-204	-3.07%	6,638
Tunica	1,709	69.70%	743	30.30%	966	39.40%	2,452
Union	3,907	51.30%	3,709	48.70%	198	2.60%	7,616
Walthall	2,813	59.31%	1,930	40.69%	883	18.62%	4,743
Warren	7,186	60.05%	4,781	39.95%	2,405	20.10%	11,967
Washington	7,260	75.36%	2,374	24.64%	4,886	50.72%	9,634
Wayne	3,453	54.26%	2,911	45.74%	542	8.52%	6,364
Webster	1,773	50.89%	1,711	49.11%	62	1.78%	3,484
Wilkinson	2,616	73.15%	960	26.85%	1,656	46.31%	3,576
Winston	3,841	60.64%	2,493	39.36%	1,348	21.28%	6,334
Yalobusha	2,306	60.49%	1,506	39.51%	800	20.99%	3,812
Yazoo	4,333	64.47%	2,388	35.53%	1,945	28.94%	6,721
Totals	400,110	55.36%	322,648	44.64%	77,462	10.72%	722,758

==== By congressional district ====
Hood won three of four congressional districts, including two that were represented by Republicans.

District	Hood	Hurst	Representative
1st	53%	47%	Trent Kelly
2nd	72%	28%	Bennie Thompson
3rd	51%	49%	Gregg Harper
4th	43%	57%	Steven Palazzo
