= Eric G. Olshan =

American lawyer

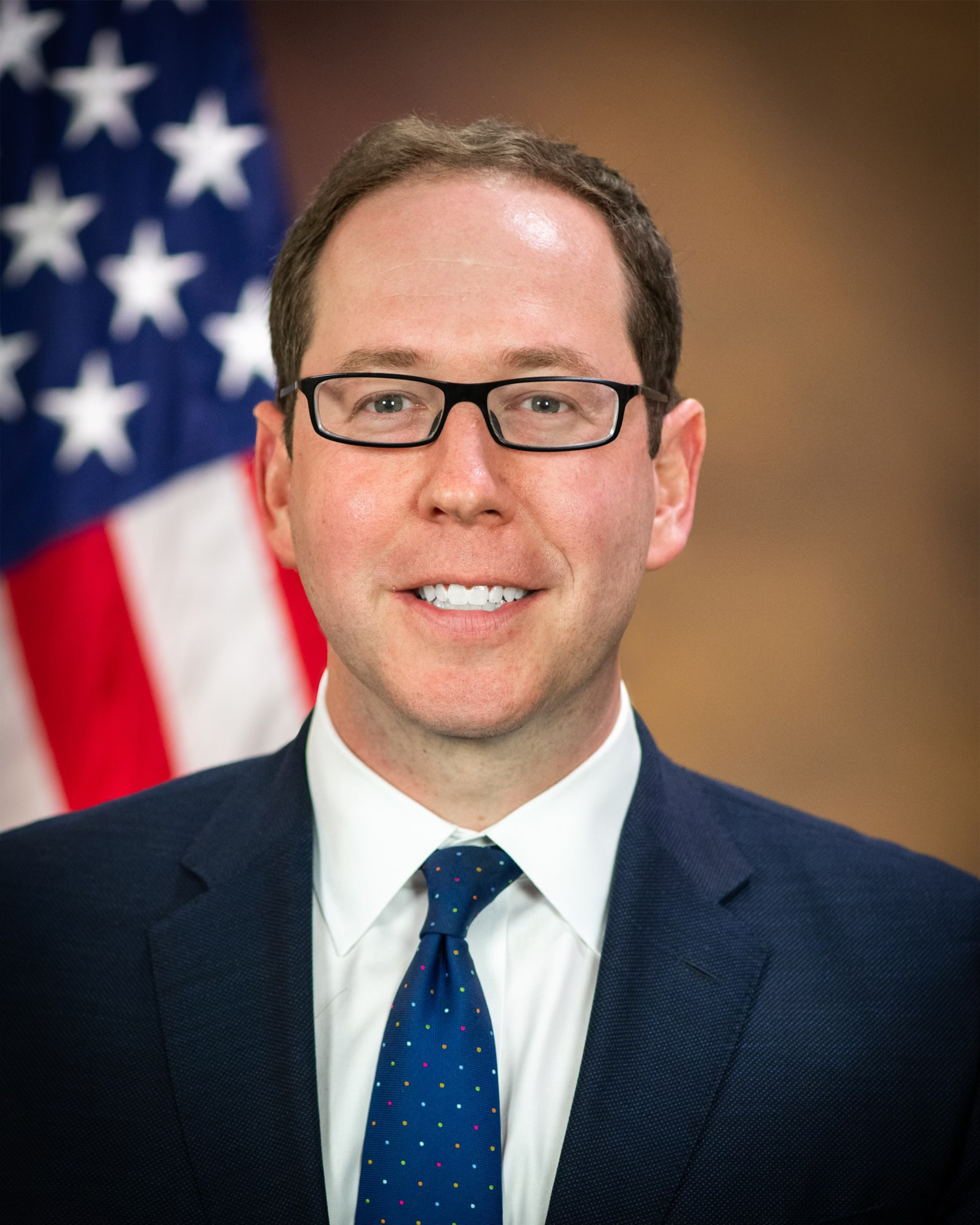

United States Attorney for the Western District of Pennsylvania
- In office June 12, 2023 – January 19, 2025
- Appointed by: Joe Biden
- Preceded by: Cindy K. Chung
- Succeeded by: Troy Rivetti (Acting)

Personal details
- Education: University of North Carolina at Chapel Hill (BS); Northwestern University (JD)

Eric G. Olshan is an American lawyer and a former United States attorney for the Western District of Pennsylvania from June 2023 to January 2025.

== Education ==
Olshan received a Bachelor of Science from the University of North Carolina at Chapel Hill in 2003 and a Juris Doctor from Northwestern University Pritzker School of Law in 2006.

== Career ==
From 2006 to 2007, Olshan served as a clerk for Judge Richard C. Tallman of the United States Court of Appeals for the Ninth Circuit. He entered the Department of Justice through the Attorney General's Honors Program. From 2007 to 2017, Olshan served in the Public Integrity Section of the Criminal Division of the U.S. Department of Justice in Washington, D.C., first as a trial attorney from 2007 to 2013 and then as deputy chief from 2013 to 2017. In 2017, he became an assistant United States attorney in the U.S. Attorney's Office for the Western District of Pennsylvania, serving as chief of the Economic/Cyber/National Security Crimes Section.

Olshan entered private practice at the McGuireWoods law firm, in March 2025, as a partner in its Pittsburgh office, following his January resignation from public office.

=== U.S. attorney ===
On March 20, 2023, President Joe Biden announced his intent to nominate Olshan to be the United States attorney for the Western District of Pennsylvania. On March 21, 2023, his nomination was sent to the United States Senate. On May 4, 2023, his nomination was reported out of committee by a 13–8 vote. On June 8, 2023, the United States Senate confirmed him by a voice vote. He was sworn in on June 12, 2023. Oshan resigned on January 19, 2025.

Legal offices
Preceded by Cindy K. Chung	United States Attorney for the Western District of Pennsylvania; 2023–present	Incumbent
