= Cindy K. Chung =

American judge (born 1975)

Cindy Chung
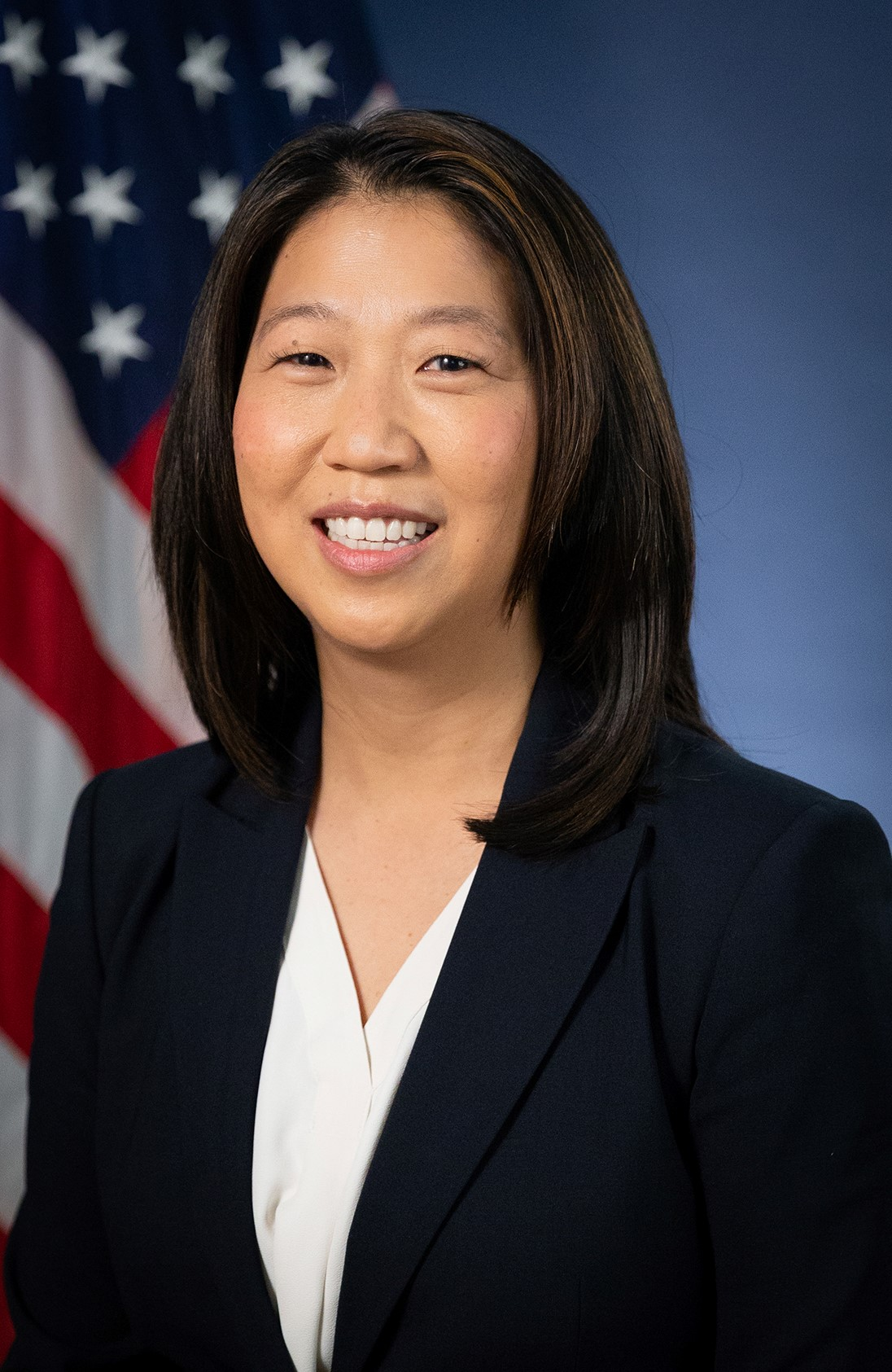

Judge of the United States Court of Appeals for the Third Circuit
- Incumbent
- Assumed office February 21, 2023
- Appointed by: Joe Biden
- Preceded by: D. Brooks Smith

United States Attorney for the Western District of Pennsylvania
- In office November 23, 2021 – February 17, 2023
- Appointed by: Joe Biden
- Preceded by: Scott Brady
- Succeeded by: Eric G. Olshan

Personal details
- Born: Cindy Kyounga Chung; 1975 (age 50–51) Omaha, Nebraska, U.S.
- Education: Yale University (BA); Columbia University (JD)

Cindy Kyounga Chung (born 1975) is an American lawyer serving as a United States circuit judge of the United States Court of Appeals for the Third Circuit. She previously served as United States attorney for the Western District of Pennsylvania from 2021 to 2023.

== Early life and education ==
Chung was born in 1975 in Omaha, Nebraska. She is Korean American. She earned a Bachelor of Arts from Yale University in 1997 and a Juris Doctor from Columbia Law School in 2002.

== Career ==
From 2002 to 2003, Chung served as a law clerk for Judge Myron H. Thompson of the United States District Court for the Middle District of Alabama. She then joined the Manhattan District Attorney's office in 2003, serving as an assistant district attorney until 2007 and as investigation counsel in the Official Corruption Unit from 2007 to 2009. From 2009 to 2014, Chung served as a trial attorney in the United States Department of Justice Civil Rights Division.

From 2014 to 2021, she served as assistant United States attorney for the Western District of Pennsylvania, ultimately serving as deputy chief of the Major Crimes Division.

=== Notable cases ===
In 2007, Chung prosecuted rapper Foxy Brown for violating probation after assaulting two manicurists.

In 2011, Chung was involved in prosecuting Frankie Maybee and Sean Popejoy, the first defendants to be sentenced under the Shepherd-Byrd Hate Crimes Prevention Act.

=== United States attorney ===
On October 27, 2021, President Joe Biden nominated Chung to be the United States attorney for the Western District of Pennsylvania. On November 19, 2021, her nomination was confirmed in the United States Senate by voice vote. She was sworn into office on November 23, 2021, by Chief Judge Mark R. Hornak. She resigned on February 17, 2023, to become a circuit judge of the Third Circuit.

=== Federal judicial service ===
On July 12, 2022, President Joe Biden nominated Chung to serve as a United States circuit judge for the United States Court of Appeals for the Third Circuit. President Biden nominated Chung to the seat vacated by Judge D. Brooks Smith, who assumed senior status on December 4, 2021. Chung was unanimously rated "well qualified" for the circuit judgeship by the American Bar Association's Standing Committee on the Federal Judiciary.

On September 7, 2022, a hearing on her nomination was held before the Senate Judiciary Committee. During her confirmation hearing, she was questioned by Senator Chuck Grassley about her judicial philosophy. A debate ensued between Senators Sheldon Whitehouse, Mazie Hirono, and Mike Lee about the term "originalism". On September 28, 2022, her nomination was favorably reported by the committee by a 12–10 vote. On January 3, 2023, her nomination was returned to the president under Rule XXXI, Paragraph 6 of the United States Senate; she was renominated later the same day. On February 2, 2023, her nomination was favorably reported by the committee by an 11–9 vote. On February 7, 2023, Majority Leader Chuck Schumer filed cloture on her nomination. On February 9, 2023, the Senate invoked cloture on her nomination by a 52–46 vote. On February 13, 2023, her nomination was confirmed by a 50–44 vote. She received her judicial commission on February 21, 2023. She is the first Asian-American to ever serve on the Third Circuit.

== See also ==
- List of Asian American jurists

Legal offices
Preceded by D. Brooks Smith	Judge of the United States Court of Appeals for the Third Circuit; 2023–present	Incumbent
