= Charles Peeler =

American lawyer (born 1973)

Charles E. Peeler
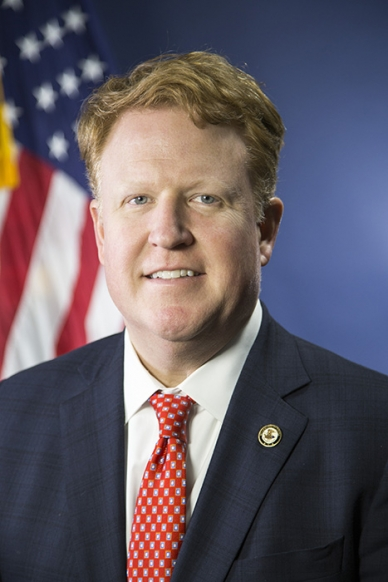

United States Attorney for the Middle District of Georgia
- In office November 22, 2017 – December 11, 2020
- President: Donald Trump
- Preceded by: Michael J. Moore
- Succeeded by: Peter D. Leary

Personal details
- Born: Charles Edward Peeler; March 18, 1973 (age 53) Augusta, Georgia, U.S.
- Spouse: Melissa Peeler
- Children: 3
- Education: University of Georgia (B.S.); University of Georgia School of Law (J.D.)

Charles Edward "Charlie" Peeler (born March 18, 1973) is an American attorney who was the United States Attorney for the United States District Court for the Middle District of Georgia from 2017 to 2020. He returned to private practice on January 4, 2021, joining Troutman Pepper.

== Education and legal career ==
Originally from Albany, Georgia, he received his Bachelor of Science in biochemistry and molecular biology in 1995 from the University of Georgia and his Juris Doctor, cum laude, in 1999 from the University of Georgia School of Law. Before co-founding Flynn Peeler & Phillips in 2005, Peeler was an attorney at King & Spalding. His legal practice focused on complex civil litigation and federal criminal issues.

== U.S. Attorney ==
On August 3, 2017, President Donald Trump nominated Peeler to become the United States Attorney for the Middle District of Georgia. On November 9, 2017, his nomination was confirmed by voice vote in the United States Senate. He was sworn into office on November 22, 2017.

During his tenure as U.S. Attorney, Peeler's office prosecuted crimes including federal firearms charges, fraudulent tax returns, drug distribution, and bank robbery. Peeler resigned on December 11, 2020, and joined the national law firm Troutman Pepper (now Troutman Pepper Locke) in January 2021, becoming a managing partner.
