= Peter D. Leary =

American lawyer

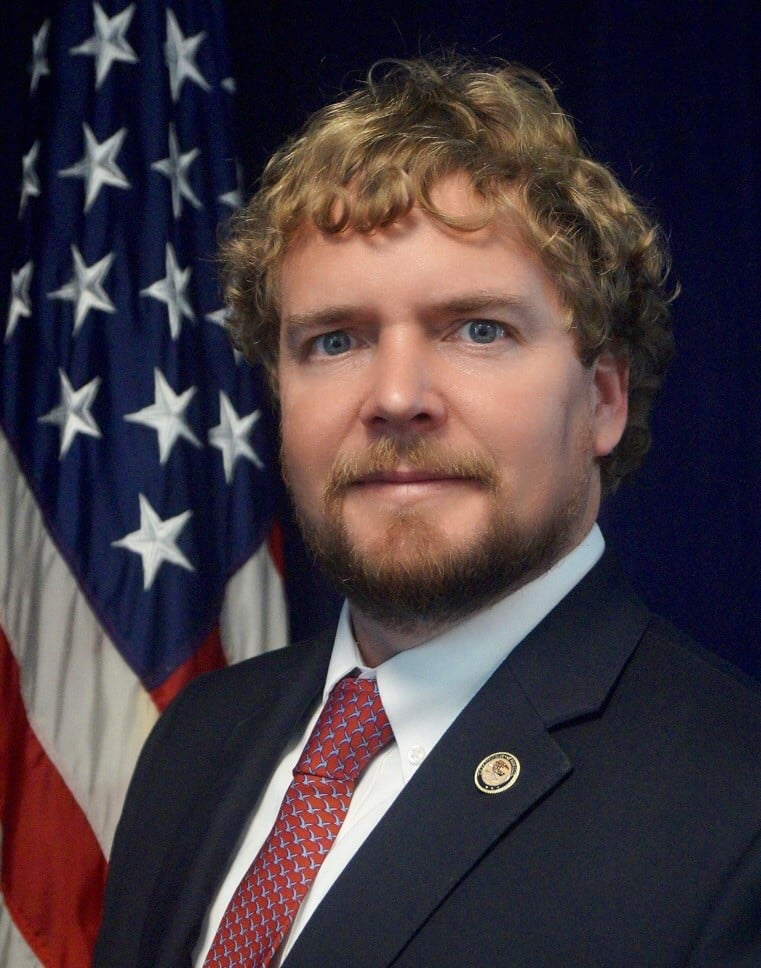

United States Attorney for the Middle District of Georgia
- In office December 12, 2022 – January 11, 2025
- President: Joe Biden
- Preceded by: Charles Peeler
- Succeeded by: C. Shanelle Booker (acting)
- Court appointment
- In office March 17, 2022 – December 12, 2022
- Acting
- In office December 14, 2020 – March 17, 2022

Personal details
- Education: University of Virginia (BA, JD)

Peter D. Leary is an American lawyer who served as the United States attorney for the Middle District of Georgia from 2020 to 2025.

== Early life and education ==
Leary was raised in Watkinsville, Georgia. He received a Bachelor of Arts from the University of Virginia, where he was a Jefferson Scholar, in 2000, and a Juris Doctor from the University of Virginia School of Law in 2005.

== Career ==
He served a law clerk for Judge Hugh Lawson of the United States District Court for the Middle District of Georgia from 2005 to 2007. From 2007 to 2012, he served as a trial attorney in the federal programs branch of the Department of Justice's Civil Division. He previously served as an assistant United States attorney for the Middle District of Georgia from 2012 to 2021. Leary serves as adjunct faculty at Mercer University School of Law, teaching criminal justice.

=== U.S. attorney for the Middle District of Georgia ===
==== Appointment ====
On December 14, 2020, Leary was appointed the acting U.S. attorney after the resignation of Charles Peeler. On March 17, 2022, he was appointed as the U.S. attorney by Chief District Judge Marc T. Treadwell.

==== Nomination and confirmation ====
On October 19, 2022, President Joe Biden announced his intent to nominate Leary to be the United States attorney for the Middle District of Georgia. On November 14, 2022, his nomination was sent to the United States Senate. On November 17, 2022, his nomination was reported out of committee by a voice vote, with Senators Josh Hawley and Marsha Blackburn voting no on record. On December 6, 2022, his nomination was confirmed in the Senate by voice vote. He was sworn in by Chief District Judge Marc T. Treadwell on December 12, 2022. He resigned from office on January 11, 2025.

Legal offices
Preceded by Charles Peeler	United States Attorney for the Middle District of Georgia; 2022–2025	Succeeded by C. Shanelle Booker; Acting
