= Rebecca C. Lutzko =

American lawyer

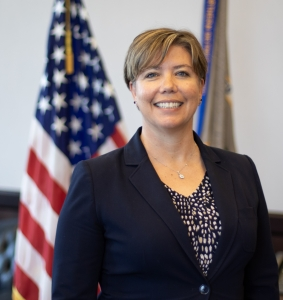

United States Attorney for the Northern District of Ohio
- Interim/Court appointment
- Assumed office June 9, 2023
- Preceded by: Michelle M. Baeppler (acting)

Personal details
- Born: Rebecca Chattin Lutzko
- Education: Boston University (BA); Georgetown University (JD)

Rebecca Chattin Lutzko is an American lawyer who has served as the interim United States attorney for the Northern District of Ohio since June 2023. In June 2023, she was nominated to serve as the permanent U.S. attorney for the same district.

== Education ==
Lutzko received a Bachelor of Arts, magna cum laude, from Boston University in 1993 and a Juris Doctor, cum laude, from Georgetown University Law Center in 1997.

== Career ==
After graduating law school, Lutzko served as a law clerk for Judge Alice M. Batchelder of the United States Court of Appeals for the Sixth Circuit from 1997 to 1998. From 1998 to 2005, she was an associate at BakerHostetler in Cleveland. Since 2005, she has served as an assistant United States attorney in the U.S. Attorney's Office for the Northern District of Ohio. While in that role, from 2010 to 2011, she served as the deputy chief of the Major Fraud and Corruption Unit and since 2017, she has served as the chief of the Appeals Unit.

=== United States attorney for the Northern District of Ohio ===
In early 2023, Lutzko was mentioned as a frontrunner to be U.S. attorney. On June 7, 2023, President Joe Biden announced his intent to nominate Lutzko to serve as the United States attorney for the Northern District of Ohio. On June 8, 2023, her nomination was sent to the Senate. On September 14, 2023, her nomination was reported out of the committee by a voice vote, with Senators Mike Lee, Ted Cruz, Josh Hawley, and Marsha Blackburn voting no on record. Her nomination received the support of Senator Sherrod Brown. She was appointed by the judges of the district court to serve as interim U.S. attorney and was sworn in on June 9, 2023 by Judge Patricia Anne Gaughan at the federal courthouse in Cleveland.

On January 3, 2024, her nomination was returned to the president under Rule XXXI, Paragraph 6 of the United States Senate. She was renominated on January 11. On March 7, 2024, her nomination was favorably reported out of committee by a 14–7 vote. Her nomination is pending before the United States Senate.
