= Sopen Shah =

American lawyer

Sopen B. Shah

Personal details
- Education: Harvard College (AB); Yale University (JD)

Sopen B. Shah is an American lawyer who is a former nominee to serve as the United States attorney for the Western District of Wisconsin.

== Education ==
Shah received a Bachelor of Arts, magna cum laude, from Harvard College in 2008 and a Juris Doctor from Yale Law School in 2015.

== Career ==
Prior to law school, Shah was a management consultant with McKinsey & Company and a financial analyst at Bloomberg.

She clerked for the Honorable Amul R. Thapar, then of the United States District Court for the Eastern District of Kentucky, from 2015 to 2016, and the Honorable Debra Ann Livingston, now-chief judge of the United States Court of Appeals for the Second Circuit, from 2016 to 2017.

In 2013, she was a summer associate in the criminal division of the U.S. Attorney's Office for the Eastern District of New York and in 2014, she was a summer associate at Wachtell, Lipton, Rosen & Katz. From 2017 to 2019, Shah served as a Deputy Solicitor General for the Wisconsin Department of Justice's Office of the Solicitor General.

Shah joined the law firm Perkins Coie LLP in 2019 and is currently a partner in the Appeals, Issues & Strategy practice.

=== Nomination as U.S. attorney ===
In May 2021, Shah, along with Assistant United States Attorney Diane Schlipper, were recommended for consideration as candidates to senators Tammy Baldwin and Ron Johnson. On June 6, 2022, President Joe Biden nominated her to be the United States Attorney for the Western District of Wisconsin. On July 20, 2022, it was reported that Johnson was opposed to Shah's nomination due to a deleted tweet concerning the 2021 United States Capitol attack. On January 3, 2023, her nomination was returned to the president under Rule XXXI, Paragraph 6 of the United States Senate.
