= Michael J. Moore =

American attorney and politician (born 1968)

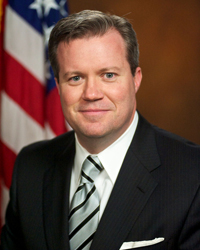

United States Attorney for the Middle District of Georgia
- In office October 6, 2010 – November 23, 2015
- President: Barack Obama
- Preceded by: Maxwell Wood
- Succeeded by: Charles Peeler

Member of the Georgia State Senate from the 18th district
- In office January 31, 2002 – January 13, 2003
- Preceded by: Sonny Perdue
- Succeeded by: Ross Tolleson

Personal details
- Born: Michael Jonathan Moore; September 12, 1968 (age 57) Atlanta, Georgia, U.S.
- Party: Democratic
- Spouse: Debbie Moore
- Children: 2
- Education: Mercer University (BA, JD)
- Occupation: Attorney, politician

Michael Jonathan Moore (born September 12, 1968) is an American attorney and former politician from Georgia. Moore is a former Georgia state senator and United States Attorney for the Middle District of Georgia.

== Early life ==
On September 12, 1968, Moore was born in Atlanta, Georgia.

== Education ==
In 1989, Moore earned a Bachelor of Arts degree from Mercer University. In 1993, Moore earned a JD degree in law from Mercer University School of Law.

== Career ==
On January 31, 2002, Moore was sworn in as a member of Georgia Senate. Moore served as a member of Georgia Senate until January 2003.

Moore is a former US attorney who was appointed by President Obama and served as the United States Attorney for the Middle District of Georgia from 2010 to 2015.

Moore is a founding partner of Moore Hall, a law firm in Atlanta, Georgia.

== Personal life ==
Moore is married to Debbie Moore. They have two children together and live in Perry, Georgia.
