= Leake County School District =

School district in Mississippi

Coordinates: 32.736572°N 89.534047°W

The Leake County School District is a public school district based in Carthage, Mississippi (USA). The district's boundaries parallel that of Leake County.

== History ==
Medgar Evers, Derrick Bell, and Winson Hudson helped lead efforts for civil rights in Leake County and to desegregate its schools.

A 1969 desegregation order allowed people in a southern part of Leake County to attend the Scott County School District's Sebastapol school. In 2010 a court ordered that such students (except those with parents with jobs in the relevant county) attend schools of the Leake County School District. This decision affected about 70-75 students.

== Schools ==
- Leake Central High School (Grades 9-12) in Carthage
- Leake County High School (Grades 7-12) in Walnut Grove (formerly South Leake High School)
  - In 2026, Leake County High School's high school component will consolidate into Leake Central High, while its middle school students will be assigned to middle schools.
- Leake Central Junior High School (Grades 6-8)
- Leake County Elementary School (Grades K-6)
- Leake Central Elementary School (Grades K-5)
- Leake County Career & Technical Center

Former schools

- Edinburg Attendance Center
- Thomastown Attendance Center

Basketball player turned preacher Marcus Mann (basketball) and baseball player Art Gardner attended South Leake High School.

== Demographics ==
=== 2006-07 school year ===
There were a total of 3,326 students enrolled in the Leake County School District during the 2006–2007 school year. The gender makeup of the district was 47% female and 53% male. The racial makeup of the district was 57.76% African American, 37.43% White, 3.19% Hispanic, 1.08% Native American, and 0.54% Asian. 64.2% of the district's students were eligible to receive free lunch.

=== Previous school years ===
School Year	Enrollment	Gender Makeup		Racial Makeup				
School Year	Enrollment	Female	Male	Asian	African American	Hispanic	Native American	White
2005-06	3,325	47%	53%	0.33%	58.14%	2.38%	1.11%	38.05%
2004-05	3,268	48%	52%	0.49%	58.63%	1.96%	1.32%	37.61%
2003-04	3,345	48%	52%	0.33%	58.00%	1.79%	1.35%	38.54%
2002-03	3,318	47%	53%	0.18%	58.62%	1.66%	1.27%	38.28%

== Accountability statistics ==
	2006-07	2005-06	2004-05	2003-04	2002-03
District Accreditation Status	Accredited	Accredited	Accredited	Accredited	Accredited
School Performance Classifications
Level 5 (Superior Performing) Schools	1	1	0	0	0
Level 4 (Exemplary) Schools	1	3	2	0	0
Level 3 (Successful) Schools	4	3	4	6	5
Level 2 (Under Performing) Schools	1	0	0	1	2
Level 1 (Low Performing) Schools	0	0	1	0	0
Not Assigned	0	0	0	0	0

== See also ==
- List of school districts in Mississippi
