= Randy Rushing =

American politician

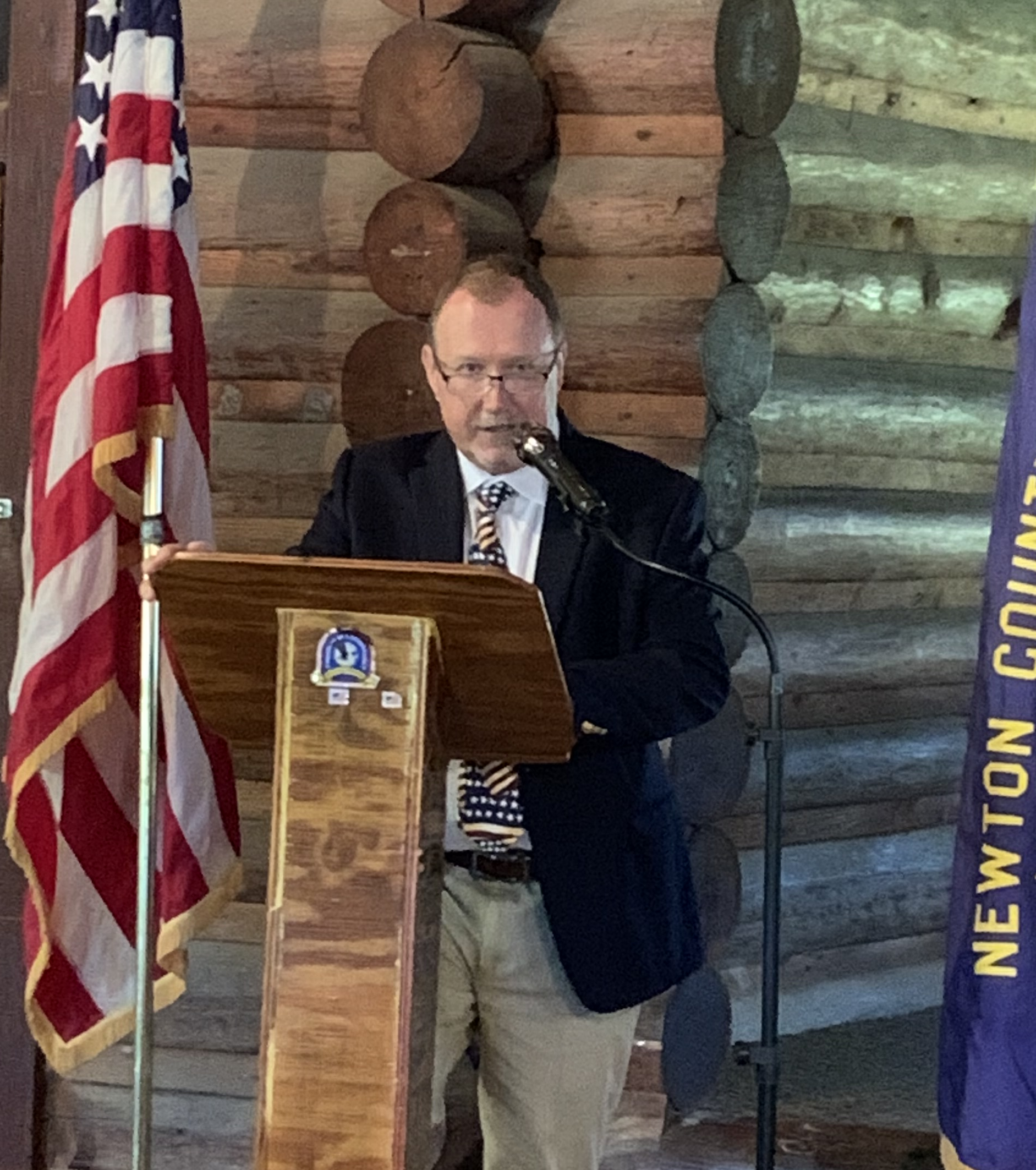

Member of the Mississippi House of Representatives from the 78th district
- Incumbent
- Assumed office January 3, 2012
- Preceded by: Billy Nicholson

Personal details
- Born: September 9, 1963 (age 62) Carthage, Mississippi, U.S.
- Education: Newton County Academy
- Alma mater: Community College of the Air Force; East Central Community College

Randal Kevin Rushing (born September 9, 1963) is an American Republican politician. He is a member of the Mississippi House of Representatives from the 78th District, being first elected in 2011.

In the 2024–2028 Mississippi Legislature, Rushing has been appointed to be on the Select Committee on Tax Reform.
