= Carthage, Mississippi =

City in the United States

- City
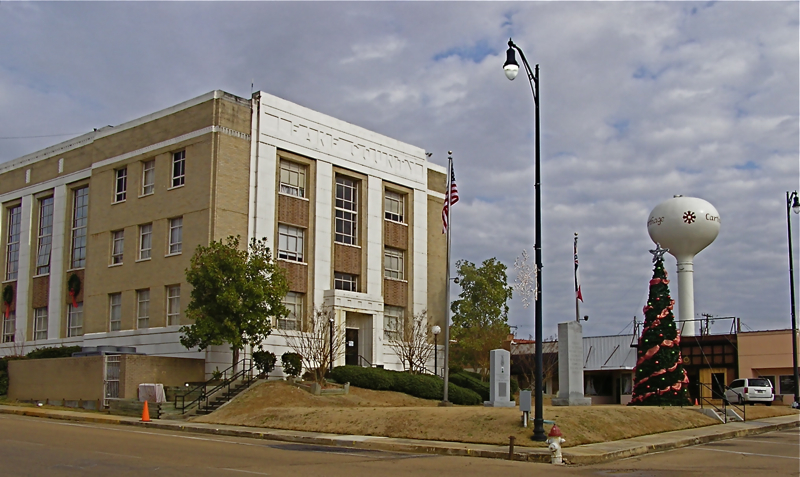
- Leake County Courthouse in Carthage

- Flag Seal

- Location of Carthage, Mississippi

- Location in the United States
- Coordinates: 32°44′29″N 89°32′6″W
- Country: United States
- State: Mississippi
- County: Leake

Government
  - Mayor: Laurie Henderson

Area
  - Total: 9.34 sq mi (24.19 km^{2})
  - Land: 9.29 sq mi (24.07 km^{2})
  - Water: 0.046 sq mi (0.12 km^{2})
- Elevation: 351 ft (107 m)

Population (2020)
  - Total: 4,901
  - Density: 527.4/sq mi (203.63/km^{2})
- Time zone: UTC-6 (Central (CST))
  - Summer (DST): UTC-5 (CDT)
- ZIP code: 39051
- Area code: 601
- FIPS code: 28-11780
- GNIS feature ID: 0668123
- Website: www.cityofcarthage.org

The city of Carthage is the county seat of Leake County, Mississippi, United States. As of the 2020 census, Carthage had a population of 4,901.

Carthage is home to the Carthage Historic District including the Leake County Courthouse, a Mississippi Landmark. The largest chicken processing plant in the world is located in Carthage.

== History ==
Carthage was established in 1834, and became the county seat. The Harris family were early settlers, and named the town after their former home of Carthage, Tennessee. A courthouse and jail were built in 1836, and a post office was established the following year. Carthage was incorporated in 1876. A brick courthouse replaced the previous one in 1877, and was replaced again in 1910. The present courthouse was designed by E. L. Malvaney and completed in 1939. The Carthaginian newspaper was established in 1872, and remains in publication today.

By 1900, agriculture was the primary industry in Leake County. The Pearl River, located 2 mi (3.2 km) south of Carthage, was used to ship goods by steamboat to and from Jackson, the state capital . Although a railroad eventually ran through Carthage, it did not play a significant role in the development of the town. In 1914, the Merrill Brothers Logging Company built a logging railroad from Canton to McAfee, passing through Carthage. The line was taken over in 1927 by the Canton and Carthage Railroad, which then established commercial service to Carthage. The railroad was abandoned in 1960.

In 1927, Jackson's Daily Clarion Ledger wrote an article entitled "Carthage is a Good Progressive and Enterprising City - Thriving Center of Leake County Holds Modern Benefits". By then, Carthage had schools, churches, an ice plant, two banks, a Masonic Hall, and a Coca-Cola bottling plant.

The population had surpassed 2,000 by 1964, and the town was reclassified as a city.

Carthage Historic District includes the county courthouse, commercial and residential properties of various architectural styles and is listed on the National Register of Historic Places. The Carthage Post Office and Jordan House are individually listed.

When Carthage, Texas established in 1848, it was named after Carthage, Mississippi.

=== Civil Rights Era ===
As early as 1948, Carthage began holding an annual "Tri-Racial Goodwill Festival", in which all citizens were included. Although the directors of the first festival separated whites, African Americans and Native Americans, this was corrected in subsequent years. The local newspaper reported that at the 1949 festival, "friendship and goodwill fellowship permeated the air".

In 1964, a group known as Americans for the Preservation of the White Race initiated a boycott in Carthage against white-owned businesses that were complying with the Civil Rights Act. When members of the Student Nonviolent Coordinating Committee tried to open a Freedom School in Carthage, local whites told them their deed was invalid, and threatened to burn the school. In 1967, shots were fired into the home of an NAACP worker in Carthage.

== Geography ==
According to the United States Census Bureau, the city has a total area of 9.4 square miles (24 km^{2}), of which 9.4 square miles (24 km^{2}) is land and 0.1 square miles (0.26 km^{2}) (0.53%) is water.

The geographic center of Mississippi is located 9 mi (14 km) west-northwest of Carthage.

=== Climate ===
Climate data for Carthage, Mississippi, 1991–2020 normals, extremes 1955–2015
Month	Jan	Feb	Mar	Apr	May	Jun	Jul	Aug	Sep	Oct	Nov	Dec	Year
Record high °F (°C)	82 (28)	86 (30)	89 (32)	94 (34)	97 (36)	104 (40)	104 (40)	106 (41)	104 (40)	95 (35)	87 (31)	82 (28)	106 (41)
Mean maximum °F (°C)	74.5 (23.6)	77.6 (25.3)	83.3 (28.5)	86.4 (30.2)	90.9 (32.7)	95.0 (35.0)	97.5 (36.4)	97.7 (36.5)	94.5 (34.7)	89.0 (31.7)	82.2 (27.9)	75.7 (24.3)	99.0 (37.2)
Mean daily maximum °F (°C)	56.8 (13.8)	61.2 (16.2)	69.1 (20.6)	75.8 (24.3)	83.0 (28.3)	89.2 (31.8)	92.1 (33.4)	91.7 (33.2)	87.5 (30.8)	77.8 (25.4)	66.8 (19.3)	58.2 (14.6)	75.7 (24.3)
Daily mean °F (°C)	45.1 (7.3)	48.9 (9.4)	56.4 (13.6)	63.4 (17.4)	71.1 (21.7)	78.3 (25.7)	81.4 (27.4)	80.9 (27.2)	75.8 (24.3)	64.4 (18.0)	53.8 (12.1)	46.7 (8.2)	63.8 (17.7)
Mean daily minimum °F (°C)	33.5 (0.8)	36.6 (2.6)	43.7 (6.5)	51.1 (10.6)	59.2 (15.1)	67.3 (19.6)	70.7 (21.5)	70.1 (21.2)	64.1 (17.8)	51.1 (10.6)	40.8 (4.9)	35.1 (1.7)	51.9 (11.1)
Mean minimum °F (°C)	15.8 (−9.0)	19.5 (−6.9)	25.7 (−3.5)	33.4 (0.8)	44.4 (6.9)	54.6 (12.6)	61.7 (16.5)	60.9 (16.1)	46.4 (8.0)	32.7 (0.4)	25.1 (−3.8)	18.1 (−7.7)	12.2 (−11.0)
Record low °F (°C)	−5 (−21)	−1 (−18)	13 (−11)	26 (−3)	38 (3)	44 (7)	51 (11)	52 (11)	36 (2)	26 (−3)	15 (−9)	1 (−17)	−5 (−21)
Average precipitation inches (mm)	5.71 (145)	5.32 (135)	5.05 (128)	6.31 (160)	4.38 (111)	3.92 (100)	5.08 (129)	4.70 (119)	3.80 (97)	3.88 (99)	4.34 (110)	5.32 (135)	57.81 (1,468)
Average snowfall inches (cm)	0.1 (0.25)	0.1 (0.25)	0.0 (0.0)	0.0 (0.0)	0.0 (0.0)	0.0 (0.0)	0.0 (0.0)	0.0 (0.0)	0.0 (0.0)	0.0 (0.0)	0.0 (0.0)	0.0 (0.0)	0.2 (0.51)
Average precipitation days (≥ 0.01 in)	9.9	8.2	7.6	7.3	7.7	8.3	8.8	7.5	5.8	6.1	7.0	9.5	93.7
Average snowy days (≥ 0.1 in)	0.1	0.1	0.0	0.0	0.0	0.0	0.0	0.0	0.0	0.0	0.0	0.0	0.2
Source 1: NOAA
Source 2: National Weather Service (mean maxima/minima 1981–2010)

== Demographics ==
Historical population
Census	Pop.	Note	%±
1880	285		—
1890	322		13.0%
1900	416		29.2%
1910	315		−24.3%
1920	635		101.6%
1930	998		57.2%
1940	1,766		77.0%
1950	1,925		9.0%
1960	2,442		26.9%
1970	3,031		24.1%
1980	3,453		13.9%
1990	3,819		10.6%
2000	4,637		21.4%
2010	5,075		9.4%
2020	4,901		−3.4%
U.S. Decennial Census

=== 2020 census ===
As of the 2020 census, Carthage had a population of 4,901. The median age was 32.9 years. 29.3% of residents were under the age of 18 and 14.0% of residents were 65 years of age or older. For every 100 females there were 94.6 males, and for every 100 females age 18 and over there were 93.5 males age 18 and over.

0.0% of residents lived in urban areas, while 100.0% lived in rural areas.

There were 1,626 households in Carthage, including 1,024 families. Of those households, 43.7% had children under the age of 18 living in them. Of all households, 32.8% were married-couple households, 15.3% were households with a male householder and no spouse or partner present, and 44.8% were households with a female householder and no spouse or partner present. About 26.4% of all households were made up of individuals, and 12.0% had someone living alone who was 65 years of age or older.

There were 1,747 housing units, of which 6.9% were vacant. The homeowner vacancy rate was 3.3% and the rental vacancy rate was 4.1%.

Carthage Racial Composition
Race	Num.	Perc.
White	1,458	29.75%
Black or African American	2,366	48.28%
Native American	78	1.59%
Asian	41	0.84%
Pacific Islander	1	0.02%
Other/Mixed	106	2.16%
Hispanic or Latino	851	17.36%

=== 2000 census ===
As of the census of 2000, there were 4,637 people, 1,490 households, and 1,065 families residing in the city. The population density was 495.9 inhabitants per square mile (191.5/km^{2}). There were 1,654 housing units at an average density of 176.9 per square mile (68.3/km^{2}). The racial makeup of the city was 52.86% White, 44.25% African American, 1.04% Native American, 0.43% Asian, 0.02% Pacific Islander, 0.58% from other races, and 0.82% from two or more races. Hispanic or Latino of any race were 1.94% of the population.

There were 1,490 households, out of which 37.1% had children under the age of 18 living with them, 43.8% were married couples living together, 23.6% had a female householder with no husband present, and 28.5% were non-families. 25.4% of all households were made up of individuals, and 13.5% had someone living alone who was 65 years of age or older. The average household size was 2.62 and the average family size was 3.12.

In the city, the population was spread out, with 26.1% under the age of 18, 11.7% from 18 to 24, 28.4% from 25 to 44, 18.1% from 45 to 64, and 15.7% who were 65 years of age or older. The median age was 33 years. For every 100 females, there were 98.6 males. For every 100 females age 18 and over, there were 96.4 males.

The median income for a household in the city was $25,052, and the median income for a family was $30,069. Males had a median income of $27,060 versus $17,280 for females. The per capita income for the city was $12,986. About 21.5% of families and 26.8% of the population were below the poverty line, including 39.6% of those under age 18 and 18.8% of those age 65 or over.

== Economy ==
The largest chicken processing plant in the world—able to process 2.5 million chickens per week—is located on Highway 35 north of Carthage. Originally owned by Choctaw Maid Farms, the plant was flanked by a large trailer park built in the mid-1990s to house the factory's growing Hispanic migrant workforce, and the Hispanic population of Carthage increased from 1.9 percent to 12.3 percent between 2000 and 2010. The plant was purchased by Tyson Foods in 2003, and employs 1,700.

== Arts and culture ==
The Square Affair is held annually each May, and features walks, runs, a children's fishing rodeo, an idol competition, vendors, fireworks, and a basketball tournament.

== Parks and recreation ==
McMillian Park in Carthage has baseball diamonds, tennis courts, soccer field, disc golf course, two playgrounds, and a fishing pond.

Lincoln Park in Carthage has a baseball diamond, basketball court, walking trail, and community center.

== Education ==
The City of Carthage is served by the Leake County School District, the sole school district of the county. The district operates Leake Central High School.

East Central Community College covers Leake County.

== Infrastructure ==
=== Highways ===
Carthage is served by Mississippi Highway 35, Mississippi Highway 16, and Mississippi Highway 25.

=== Airport ===
The Carthage-Leake County Airport is located north of the city.

=== Law enforcement and fire ===
Carthage is protected by its own police and fire departments.

=== Health care ===
The Baptist Medical Center in Carthage provides hospital services and critical care.

== Notable people ==
- The Chambers Brothers, soul music group
- Winson Hudson, civil rights activist
- John Johnson, professional basketball player, First Team All American at University of Iowa
- Ollie McLaughlin, record producer and record label owner
- Bennett Malone, member of Mississippi House of Representatives
- Marcus Mann, Southern Baptist minister and former college basketball player
- Jay Mathis, former member of the Mississippi House of Representatives
- Ferr Smith, member of the Mississippi House of Representatives
- Arthur Tate, member of the Mississippi State Senate
- Kenneth Walker, member of the Mississippi House of Representatives
- O'Neal Wilder, World Junior gold medalist
