= Carthage High School =

Carthage High School may refer to:

- Carthage High School (Arkansas) — Carthage, Arkansas
- Carthage High School (Illinois) (now Illini West High School) — Carthage, Illinois
- Carthage High School (Carthage, Mississippi) (now Leake Central High School) — Carthage, Mississippi
- Carthage Senior High School (Carthage, Missouri) — Carthage, Missouri
- Carthage Senior High School (Carthage, New York) — Carthage, New York
- Carthage High School (Carthage, Texas) — Carthage, Texas
