= Arthur Tate =

American politician from Mississippi (born 1939)

Arthur James Tate

Member of the Mississippi State Senate
- In office 1979–1980

Personal details
- Born: August 16, 1939 (age 86) Carthage, Mississippi, US
- Party: Democratic
- Education: Tougaloo College
- Occupation: Politician, businessman

Arthur James Tate (born August 16, 1939) is an American retired politician and small business owner who was the first African American to serve in the Mississippi State Senate since the Reconstruction era. In January 1979, he ran in a Senate special election, won his race, and served one year in office. He represented Holmes County, Madison County, and Yazoo County.

== Life and career ==
Tate was born on August 16, 1939, in the small town of Carthage, Mississippi. He grew up in the Jim Crow South and attended Leake County Agricultural High School and Tougaloo College. In 1964, he moved to Canton, Mississippi, where he taught at Rogers High School. He became active in the Black civil rights movement and eventually ran for chancery court clerk. He lost that election but in January 1979 ran for the open seat of Mississippi State Senate district 15A in a special election to represent Holmes, Madison, and Yazoo counties. As a member of the Democratic Party, Tate declared his candidacy, campaigned, and won the election and runoff election, all in one month's time. He served one year in office.

Tate owns a Canton furniture store and has also sold insurance. He has served as a member of the Canton Business League, the Canton Chamber of Commerce, the local Council on Aging, and the NAACP. He is a deacon at his Baptist church in Canton. He is married to Consuella (Smith) Tate.
