= Operation Mississippi Hustle =

US federal investigation into private prisons

Operation Mississippi Hustle was a federal investigation initiated in 2014 by the United States Attorney and prosecuted in the United States District Court for the Southern District of Mississippi. It examined the relationship between officials of the Mississippi Department of Corrections and various for-profit prison contractors and subcontractors, who have provided services to the five private prisons in the state. One, Walnut Grove, closed in September 2016 but has since reopened.

The FBI revealed a long history of corruption and bribery beginning as early as 1997. The investigation resulted in indictments against Chris Epps, long-serving Commissioner of the Department of Corrections on November 6, 2014. Epps resigned from his state office and as president of the American Correctional Association (ACA) the day prior to his indictment. He had received bribes and kickbacks worth at least $1.47 million, based on contracts worth $868 million with private prison operators and related service providers.

By October 2018, sixteen other officials, consultants, contractors, and businessmen, including two former state legislators were indicted, with more expected. Eleven pleaded guilty, one committed suicide, and the identity of another had not yet been made public. The ex-mayor of Walnut Grove, Mississippi, William Grady Sims, finished his sentence. Six other defendants were convicted and are in federal custody. Four Louisiana defendants awaited trial.

Jim Hood, the Mississippi Attorney General, announced in February 2017 that he was filing civil suits against 15 prison contractors and several individuals for damages and punitive damages related to the corruption cases. He said that "state law requires that they must also forfeit and return the entire amount of the contracts paid by the state."

== Overview ==
In the late 20th century, Mississippi began to make contracts with private prison management companies to build and operate prisons. It eventually held contracts for six for-profit prisons: Walnut Grove Youth Correctional Facility, for inmates under 18 who had been convicted as adults; East Mississippi Correctional Facility, devoted to the treatment of state prisoners with mental illness; Marshall County Correctional Facility; Tallahatchie County Correctional Facility; Wilkinson County Correctional Facility, which was converted to maximum security after receiving numerous prisoners transferred from Mississippi State Penitentiary following the settlement of a class-action suit there, and Delta Correctional Facility, which closed after an escape. Contracts were also made for related mental and medical health services, education, telecommunications, and food services. In 2002, Christopher Epps was appointed as Commissioner of Mississippi Department of Corrections. He served under three governors.

On November 6, 2014, the acting United States attorney for the Southern District of Mississippi, Harold Brittain, announced indictments he had obtained against the Commissioner Epps and his associate Cecil McCrory. McCrory was a consultant and Republican former state house member. The government charged that beginning as early as 2005, Epps had taken bribes from various contractors and subcontractors for the state. These bribes had been passed through McCrory and another consultant, Robert Simmons, and had been structured to fall beneath the mandated reporting amount so they would not come to the attention of federal banking authorities. Epps resigned as commissioner and as the president of the ACA the day before the indictments were announced. Both defendants previously entered into plea bargains and became cooperative informants. Initially, they were to assist the government with the identification of the originators of those bribes, who were also to be prosecuted with the help of both men.

Epps had been appointed to the Commissioner post in 2002 by Democratic governor Ronnie Musgrove and was retained by his successors, Republican governors, Haley Barbour in 2004, and Phil Bryant in 2012. In 2011, Epps told assembled attorneys involved in negotiating lawsuits that had been brought against the Walnut Grove Correctional Facility and the East Mississippi Correctional Facility that he could not end the contracts with the for-profit companies operating Mississippi's prisons "because of all the money they spread around Jackson," the state capital. His remarks were made in the period that the Southern District of Mississippi's U.S. Attorney said Epps was receiving more than $700,000 in bribes, including the purchase of a beachfront condo on his behalf.

The government's revised estimates of the alleged bribes to Epps increased to an estimated total of at least $1.47 million. Over the next two years, the U.S. Attorney filed many indictments against persons alleged to have paid the bribes and indicated that further indictments would be forthcoming. A year after entering a guilty plea, McCrory requested that he be allowed to change his plea to "not guilty" and go to trial. This request was rejected by the judge. Many other defendants pleaded "guilty" while others pleaded "not guilty". One defendant committed suicide shortly before his arraignment. Numerous corporations were ordered to produce business records by the presiding federal judge Henry Travillion Wingate. Some complied, others ignored the subpoenas, and four requested that the information they were willing to provide be kept under seal, which Wingate took under advisement.

On November 1, 2016, while still awaiting sentencing, Epps was arrested for breaking and entering the home he had forfeited to the federal government as a part of his plea bargain. He removed light fixtures and other items which he moved to his nearby previous domicile that he was occupying. His bail was revoked and in December 2016, Wingate ruled that he would be held in jail until sentencing. On May 24, 2017, Epps received a sentence of approximately 20 years.

== Background ==
Mississippi was among the many states that began to depend on private contractors to build and operate prisons to house its growing number of inmates in the late 20th century and early 21st century. These inmates had been convicted and sentenced under increased criminalisation of drug possession and a variety of mandatory sentencing laws. The private prisons and management included contracts with the GEO Group, which purchased Cornell Corrections, the Texas firm that built and operated the Walnut Grove Correctional Facility in Walnut Grove, Mississippi. The prison opened in 2001 in an unincorporated area of Leake County, but the town annexed the prison property to increase its population and tax base; it derived 15% of its revenues from the prison corporation's payment in lieu of taxes. The East Mississippi Correctional Facility was another private prison operated by Florida's GEO Group, then by Utah's Management and Training Corporation. Numerous contractors served other public and for-profit facilities, providing related telecommunications, food services, health, and other services.

Leake County Sheriff Greg Waggoner said that he started the federal investigation into the Mississippi Department of Corrections (MDOC) activities. In 2009, he said Epps' MDOC leased buildings were owned by McCrory in Walnut Grove, Mississippi, which later became the Walnut Grove Transition Center. MDOC also contracted with McCrory to operate the male and female facilities. Although Walnut Grove's longtime mayor, Sims, had no correctional experience, McCrory appointed him as the warden of the Transition Center. In addition, Sims had a separate contract for revenues from 19 vending machines at the Walnut Grove Youth Correctional Facility.

Walnut Grove was to be a model transition center to support newly released inmates in adjusting to life outside prison as part of a state effort. The center charged newly released inmates $20 a day for room and board in dormitories and was paid a supplement of $6 daily, per bed, by the MDOC. Nearby Walnut Grove residents complained that the center residents were poorly supervised and appeared to roam in town without structured activities.

According to Waggoner, "It looked like everything new that happened with MDOC, Cecil [McCrory] was involved in ... They [residents of the center] were not supposed to be out at all." He said, "If I ran my facility like that, Epps would have shut me down, but it seemed like there was no problem when McCrory did it." After Sims was reported to have taken a female inmate to a motel in nearby Carthage for sex in November 2009, Waggoner became involved. He reported the allegation to MDOC, which assigned an internal investigator to assist the sheriff in an investigation.

Investigators from both Leake County and the state jointly talked to the female inmate, gathering evidence to refer the case to the county district attorney. In the spring of 2010, before they could do so, the MDOC investigator came to Waggoner and told him it was over. "We're closing the case down," he told Waggoner, who was "shocked" and asked why. Waggoner told a reporter, "You could tell he wasn't happy about it but that he was given orders." Waggoner said firing a man who committed a felony does not end an investigation; it ends when the man is indicted and brought to justice; "If you have knowledge of a felony and chose not to pursue it, you're negligent in your duty." Waggoner called U.S. Attorney John Dowdy for advice who answered that he contacted the FBI afterward to report the situation. The FBI launched an investigation against Sims and eventually Epps which was named the "Mississippi Hustle."

== Indictments and suicide ==
On November 6, 2014, the Federal Government of the United States announced that it had indicted Epps on corruption charges; these charges were based on his dealings with the for-profit prison industry. The federal indictment stated that McCrory, a Republican and former Mississippi State House member, was a businessman who served as the chairperson of the Rankin County School District's board of education. He had paid Epps with kickbacks and bribes totaling more than $1 million. Those transactions included a $200,000 payment as part of the mortgage of Epps' primary residence in the Jackson area. Epps leveraged the resulting increased equity with another bribe payment to buy a condominium; he later traded up the latter for a larger, more expensive condominium. In exchange, Epps directed contracts to McCrory-owned companies for prison services contracts, as well as to related companies that hired McCrory as a paid consultant. Per the indictment, contract promotion started in 2007 and ended on March 12, 2014. Epps entered an initial plea of not guilty and received a bond of $25,000.

McCrory had previously served as a judge and former Sheriff's investigator. He started a prison commissary company, G.T. Enterprises and sold it at a substantial profit to the Centric Group holding company, which owns the Keefe Commissary Network (KCN). McCrory also had gone to work for Correctional Communications Inc. "I brought Cecil in, in 1996, to help me with political connections," said owner and consultant, Sam Waggoner. "I do all the work, and Cecil did the political stuff. I talk to him about twice a year." Waggoner said the scandal had affected his business and he worried he would lose around 40 contracts he and McCrory had been given during the past two decades. "Nobody wants to be associated with the company because of the stigma," he said. "But he did no contracts with the county jails, no connections with the sheriffs or anything like that." Sam Waggoner subsequently pleaded guilty to bribery.

In November 2014, former State Auditor-turned Governor Phil Bryant ordered rebids of the four operating contracts for prisons that had been awarded by Epps to Utah-based Management and Training Corporation (MTC). Bryant directed interim Corrections Commissioner Richard McCarty to stop negotiations with MTC over renewing a $60-million-a-year contract to manage four private prisons, which held over 4,000 state inmates. MTC was sued for mistreatment of inmates in two of those prisons. A fifth private prison was still under contract to CCA.

McCrory plea bargained to lesser federal charges. He had begun working as a consultant to MTC, GEO Group's successor operator in Mississippi for state prison contracts. It held a $60 million contract to operate three Mississippi prisons: Walnut Grove Correctional Facility, East Mississippi Correctional Facility and Marshall County Correctional Facility, all of which had been managed by the GEO Group, and a fourth, Wilkinson County Correctional Facility, which had been managed by the Corrections Corporation of America. MTC fired McCrory and claimed they knew nothing of his criminal activities.

Epps pleaded guilty to corruption-related charges in February 2015: one count of filing a false tax return and one count of conspiracy to launder money. As part of the plea, he forfeited two Mercedes-Benz vehicles and his two residences. Epps and McCrory blamed each other for beginning the bribery scheme. Sentencing was first scheduled for June 9, 2015, but a day earlier, the U.S. Attorney for Mississippi said the sentencing was indefinitely delayed as they were pursuing additional indictments.

William Martin, Supervisor of Harrison County, a former prosecutor, was indicted in February 2015. He committed suicide hours before he was scheduled to appear on charges of bribery and corruption.

On August 22, 2015, the US Attorney announced the indictment of Irb Benjamin for bribing Epps in connection with the drug and alcohol treatment programs that his company provided under contract to MDOC prisons. In addition, Benjamin was paid at least $862,000 to acquire and maintain American Correctional Association (ACA) accreditation for jails in numerous counties. Passing ACA standards was required if the prisons were to gain contracts to hold state prisoners. Epps had been elected in 2010 as the president of the ACA, and resigned the day before his indictment was announced.

Epps personally received at least the $1.47 million in bribes for steering what Assistant US Attorney Darren LaMarca estimated to be $800 million in contracts between 2006 and 2014. Judge Wingate was to hear the cases of others who were charged with bribing Epps.

Benjamin represented Alcorn County in the State House from 1976–80 and the State Senate 1984–92. He later worked for Republican lieutenant governor Eddie Briggs, who ran as a candidate for the governorship. Alcorn County paid Benjamin, president and lobbyist for Mississippi Correctional Management (MCM), $114,000 a year, although he lived more than 200 miles away. The attorney of the Alcorn County Board of Supervisors said the supervisors were not required to seek bids before giving Benjamin the contract to be warden, as it was a contract for services, which are exempt from state bid laws. He was also paid $5,000 a month to handle and maintain accreditation by the ACA for the Alcorn's Regional Correctional Facility and another $4,500 a month as warden of the jail.

Benjamin formed his business MCM in 1996 when the state Department of Corrections and counties started hiring private contractors to operate prisons and smaller regional jails. MCM operated the Grenada County Jail for several years. Benjamin said the company also had jail accreditation contracts worth $4,000 or $5,000 per month with other counties, including Chickasaw, Hancock, Holmes, Marion, Pearl River, Washington, and Yazoo. In the past, he also worked as a $3,000-a-month jail consultant for DeSoto County. The DeSoto County Board of Supervisors supervisors approved his contract in December 2008, saying "Mr. Benjamin was recommended by Commissioner Epps at the state level." On November 25, 2014, Benjamin said that he was not aware of the Epps recommendation.

Benjamin pleaded guilty to federal charges on October 18, 2016. He was sentenced to 10 years in prison and a fine of up to a quarter-million dollars. Benjamin said that he was "pressured" by Epps; the contractor estimated he had paid the Commissioner between $180,000 and $225,000 in cash bribes to secure support for his contracts to operate the regional jails. His plea also covered bribes paid for drug and alcohol rehab programs which his company ran. LaMarca told Judge Wingate "it [was] just a matter of time" until others whom Benjamin informed upon were indicted.

Robert Simmons, a consultant, was indicted for giving kickbacks to Epps from three contractors involved in constructing expansions of the Walnut Grove and East Mississippi correctional facilities on February 11, 2016. His kickbacks included part of a $10,000-a-month fee from AJA Management and Technical Services of Jackson, Mississippi and more from a second unnamed contractor. He also gave Epps kickbacks on fees involving contracts awarded to Sentinel Offender Services of Irvine, California, which supervises probationers and parolees, allegedly paying Epps $1,400 a month from his $4,000-a-month consulting fee. Simmons said that bribery was "the cost of doing business in Mississippi" when he pled guilty before U.S. District Judge Sul Ozerden in Gulfport on February 18.

In April 2016, McCrory informed the court that he wanted to change his plea to "not guilty" and requested a trial. As a consequence, the judge postponed Epps' sentencing until July 18, 2016. Epps had first been scheduled for sentencing on April 11, 2016, after pleading guilty to money laundering and filing false tax returns. Epps and McCrory's sentencing, scheduled for July 19, 2016, was delayed again by Wingate to give their defense lawyers additional time to review materials concerning how much money was gained by the 15 corporations that paid bribes to the pair. Prosecutors hoped to use the evidence to increase the recommended prison sentences for Epps and McCrory. Epps faced a possible 23 years after his 2015 guilty plea to money laundering and filing false tax returns related to $1.47 million in bribes. Numerous companies denied knowing that their consultants were giving kickbacks to Epps and others. GEO Group's Finance Director John Tyrell testified that "[they] often have consultants ..."

GEO was paying McCrory $5,000 monthly, which President and Chief Operating Officer Wayne Calabrese later increased to $10,000 (Calabrese has since retired). GEO's Finance Director Tyrrell did not answer why the amount was doubled. He speculated it may have been because on August 10, 2010, the GEO Group had absorbed Cornell Companies in a merger. Cornell had been operating Walnut Grove Youth Correctional Facility and was accused in a lawsuit for mistreating prisoners; the settlement included converting the facility to adults only. McCrory remained free on bail, with sentencing proceedings postponed three times in 2017. Outstanding issues related to how much consideration he should receive for his cooperation, including recorded conversations with other participants in the schemes. His imprisonment was delayed after his defense requested that the amount of his prospective $150,000 fine be reduced. Wingate already reduced it to $20,000 after McCrory liquidated assets to pay the over $1,000,000 forfeiture sum. Mississippi Attorney General Jim Hood subpoenaed McCrory, who gave a deposition in Hood's civil cases against corrupt companies and bureaucrats, including Florida's GEO Group, who obtained contracts while Epps' was MDOC Commissioner. The prosecutors expected a final judgment to be entered that will include setting a new date for McCrory to report to prison. McCrory initially pleaded guilty to a single count of money laundering conspiracy and faced up to 20 years in prison. He agreed to forfeit $1.7 million in assets. After being sentenced to 8 1/2 years, on February 3, 2017, McCrory continued to remain free on bail, with the judge indicating that his prison time could be reduced after the other defendants in the case were sentenced. McCrory asked that his anticipated fine be lowered considerably as he had liquidated most of his assets. McCrory's sentencing was postponed numerous times, with his attorney disputing the fine Wingate intended to impose. The $20,000 fine was not reduced further.

Assistant USAG LaMarca had announced in June 2016 that eleven additional subjects of the investigation may face criminal charges in the Epps' bribery cases. Ten more people could face federal indictments; another could face state charges, which had been expected by mid-July. LaMarca estimated the corruption's net benefit to contractors exceeded $65 million. Investigators determined that Epps demanded bribes to exercise his influence, not only at the state level but among county supervisors. Epps controlled where state inmates were placed which gave him influence over local jails. Besides Criminal Chief LaMarca, Assistant U.S. Attorney Patrick Lemon, financial analyst Kim Mitchell, acting U.S. Attorney Harold Brittain, and FBI Special Agent in Charge Christopher Freeze, were involved in investigating and prosecuting the case. They estimated a total of $65 million in questionable contracts were involved in the scheme. Given the amount, federal sentencing guidelines recommended that Epps could receive a maximum of 23 years. However, Epps' lawyer asked the judge to sentence Epps based only on the value of the bribes he collected. If the lower amount of $1.47 million had been used, Epps faced a recommended sentence between 14 and 17 1/2 years. Wingate had latitude in sentencing. Because of Epps' cooperation in providing information about those paying the bribes, prosecutors recommended a shorter sentence for the former commissioner.

Calculating benefits to 16 contractors involved examining their accounts. On June 30, John Colette, Epps' defense attorney, said he had received more than 1,500 pages of documents in the previous week and would require at least 30 days to review them. Four companies asked Wingate to shield their information from public view; four more did not respond to subpoenas. Wingate said he would hold a hearing by July 16, 2016 to consider requests for protective orders, and to consider contempt orders against companies that had failed to respond to disclosure requests.

Dr. Carl Reddix, an obstetrician/gynecologist and owner of Health Assurance LLC, a firm in Jackson, Mississippi, was indicted on July 20, 2016, for seven-count returned by a federal grand jury, was charged with paying bribes and kickbacks to Epps in return for contract awards with the MDOC and for-profit prison operators. The contracts for four for-profit Mississippi prisons held by Wexford Health Sources were sequentially taken and subsequently awarded to Reddix. In 2008, his company received a contract to "provide inmate health care services" at the Walnut Grove Correctional Facility, which was renewed in 2011. Transfers of contracts for the state's East Mississippi Correctional Facility and Marshall County Correctional Facility followed in 2012. The final contract was for Wilkinson County Correctional Facility, awarded in 2013. The attorney for Reddix said he had been the victim of a "shakedown". Chief Judge Daniel Jordan sentenced Reddix to six years in prison, plus two years of supervised release. He was fined $15,000 and required to forfeit more than $1.2 million. U.S. Attorney Mike Hurst said that Reddix had personally made 36 bribe payments to Epps over a three-year period. He reported to prison on January 29, 2018, and is being held at the Federal Correctional Institution, Butner 1 Medium custody, in North Carolina.

Teresa Dolan Malone (born August 17, 1961) is the widow of former state representative Bennett Malone, who died on December 17, 2017. He served in the legislature for 36 years and chaired the Mississippi House Corrections Committee until his resignation in 2015. On July 25, 2016, she was indicted for giving bribes to Epps through McCrory, from 2010 until 2014, on behalf of medical services provider AdminPros LLC. She initially pleaded not guilty, but changed her plea to guilty on October 6, 2017 for paying kickbacks to Epps in exchange for the receipt and continuance of an MDOC consulting agreement. She admitted to receiving $225,000 from the agreement for monitoring and Medicaid eligibility contracting which the state had with AdminPros, as arranged by Epps. She received $5,000 monthly from October 2010 to July 2014, from which she paid Epps between $1,000 to $1,750 per month. Malone faced a maximum penalty of 10 years in prison and a $250,000 fine. After she was admitted to a hospital due to complications from a double lung transplant, Wingate delayed her sentencing. Malone was sentenced on May 24, 2019, by Wingate to 41 months (3 years and 5 months) in prison and a $250,000 fine. She was being held at the FMC Carswell, in Fort Worth, Texas, with a scheduled release date of July 24, 2022, but was moved to the Residential Reentry Management program located on Maxwell Air Force Base in Montgomery, Alabama.

Guy E. "Butch" Evans, an insurance broker, was indicted in August 2016. In 2012 Evans was awarded a contract as the insurance broker of record for the MDOC. He was given exclusive access to MDOC employees to sell policies and products and received commissions from insurance companies. He gave $1,400 to $1,700 per month to Epps for 16 months, starting in January 2013. The Evans arrangement ended with the Epps indictment. Wingate initially rescheduled the trial until April 3, 2017 for Evans. On March 31, 2018, it was announced that Evans would waive indictment and plead guilty to a lesser offense, one that had not yet been charged. In April 2018, Evans pleaded guilty to aiding and abetting tax evasion while paying Epps $19,200.

On May 24, 2017, at the time Epps' sentencing, LaMarca and Colette said his cooperation could lead to charges against six or seven others, including conspirators from outside Mississippi. An additional indictment had been obtained but remained sealed. Epps forfeited his investment and bank accounts, his $310,000 Flowood residence, a $237,601 Gulf Coast condo, and a pair of Mercedes-Benz vehicles to resolve a $1,300,000 judgment against him.

In October 2018, four Louisiana businessmen—Michael LeBlanc Sr.; his son, Michael Jr.; Tawasky L. Ventroy; and Jacque B. Jackson—were indicted and arrested on charges of conspiracy, paying bribes and attempting to pay bribes to Epps and the sheriff of Kemper County, Mississippi, James Moore. In the month before the Epps and McCrory indictments became public in 2014, LeBlanc Sr. called Epps to confirm Ventroy would meet with Epps, who brought $2,000 to Epps. LeBlanc Sr. agreed to give something with a value of $5,000 or more with the intent to have Epps help with awarding and retaining the contracts for LeBlanc Sr.'s company for inmate commissary services and telephone services with the Kemper County Regional Correctional Facility and elsewhere. Jackson allegedly worked for LeBlanc Jr. to help secure the contracts. After the initial Epps' indictment, bribes were also made to Moore, who was covertly cooperating with the FBI investigation. U.S. Attorney Michael Hurst of the Southern District of Mississippi thanked Moore for "coming forward and working with [him] to catch those who violate our corruption laws".

== Scheduled trials and sentencings ==
William Grady Sims pleaded guilty to interfering with a witness and received a seven-month sentence plus six months' home confinement. Sims was also ordered by then-Mississippi state auditor Stacey Pickering to repay $31,530 for using city employees and equipment to work on the Correctional Facility and the privately owned Transitional Center on October 25, 2011. He was released from custody on January 9, 2013.

On September 15, 2016, Biloxi consultant Robert A. Simmons was sentenced by Judge Sul Ozerden to seven years and three months for his part in the MDOC bribery scandal. A sealed record filed by the U.S. Attorney's office indicated he had provided the government with "substantial assistance at great risk." His cooperation, plus a clean prior record, led Ozerden to sentence him to less than the nine years required by federal sentencing guidelines. The Department of Justice initially confronted him with considerable evidence against him, including video and audio recordings and wiretaps. Simmons had been paid a $10,000 monthly fee by AJA Management & Technical Services Inc. of Jackson, Mississippi, for 18 months as it managed expansions of the Walnut Grove and East Mississippi state prisons. Simmons gave a portion of that monthly fee to Chris Epps. Simmons admitted bribing Epps from 2005 to 2014 and William Martin from 2005 through 2011. Martin committed suicide just before the first hearing on his indictment in February 2015. Simmons is being held at the Federal Correctional Institution, Forrest City, Arkansas, and his anticipated release date is March 1, 2024.

After delaying Epps' sentencing twice, Wingate also delayed sentencing for Rankin County businessman Cecil McCrory and businessman Sam Waggoner. Waggoner pleaded guilty in August 2015 to a single count of bribery and waived indictment in a plea bargain. In November his sentencing was postponed due to his heart surgery. He admitted to Wingate that he paid more than $108,000 in kickbacks to Epps from a consulting contract with the prison phone company Global Tel-Link (GTL), which took over the Mississippi prison telephone business monopoly. As a result of the prosecutors' efforts to determine the value of the damages suffered by the state of Mississippi as a result of the bribery scheme, Waggoner's sentencing was again delayed. On January 19, 2017, the 62-year-old Waggoner was sentenced to five years in federal prison, with two years of supervised release and a $200,000 fine. He had received 5 percent of phone revenues as a consultant for Global Tel-Link, which provided phone services at Mississippi state prisons. He told the FBI that before their investigation started, he wrote Epps to end the payments. In a meeting Epps ripped the letter into "teeny, tiny pieces" and flushed it down a toilet, telling him their arrangement would continue. Waggoner said "[Epps] was basically [his] boss." Waggoner paid bribes to Epps from 2012 until at least Aug. 26, 2014. Waggoner is being held at the Federal Medical Center, Fort Worth. His anticipated release date is July 15, 2021.

Among other persons charged with bribing Epps, Irb Benjamin, a former state legislator and Alcorn County jail warden, pleaded guilty on October 18, 2016. He faced 10 years in prison, plus a fine of up to a quarter-million dollars. Wingate sentenced him to 70 months in prison, fined the former Democratic state representative and senator $100,000, and ordered him to forfeit $260,782. Wingate said the length of his sentence could be reduced depending on the convictions of the other defendants. Benjamin, who said he was "pressured" by Epps, estimated that he paid the commissioner between $180,000 and $225,000 in cash bribes to secure support for the regional jails. His plea also covered bribes paid for drug and alcohol rehab programs which his company ran under contract to the state. LaMarca told Wingate "it [was] just a matter of time" until others whom Benjamin informed upon were indicted. Benjamin is being held at the minimum security Federal Correctional Institution, Forrest City, Arkansas, with an anticipated release date of June 13, 2022.

Mark Longoria, CEO of Drug Testing Corporation of Houston, Texas, was also indicted for paying a bribe to Epps. On August 3, 2016, Longoria, who had been recorded by Epps, pleaded guilty to a single felony count of bribery. He had supplied drug testing urine cups and on February 14, 2017 was sentenced to five years in prison, fined $368,000, and ordered to forfeit $131,000. He is being held at Federal Correctional Institution, Forrest City, Arkansas, with an anticipated release date of September 13, 2021.

On December 8, 2016, McCrory repeated his request to change his plea, claiming he had received ineffective aid of counsel in April 2015 and had been pressured by the prosecutor. On December 21, 2016, Wingate rejected McCrory's request to withdraw his plea, ruling it had been made with sufficient advice of counsel. In the FBI's first interview with him, McCrory admitted to laundering $40,000 in cash for Epps; he began wearing a recording device for his conversations with Epps. After being sentenced to 8 1/2 years, on February 3, 2017, McCrory remained free on bail. Wingate said that his time may be reduced after the other defendants in the case are sentenced. He was to report to prison on November 30, 2017, and as of December 17, 2017, McCrory is being held at the Federal Correctional Institution, Talladega, Alabama, with an anticipated release date of April 24, 2025.

On November 1, 2016, while out on bail and awaiting sentencing, Epps was arrested by the Flowood, Mississippi Police Department and charged with breaking into his former primary residence, which he had given up to the federal government as part of his plea agreement. He had removed light fixtures and other items which were recovered at his nearby second home. Epps appeared in court on November 3 and said he had made a "terrible mistake", and only wanted to retrieve some outside floodlights for Halloween. On November 15, 2016, Epps petitioned the court to be allowed to be released to house arrest. Epps had been in jail since his November arrest on burglary charges when his bail was revoked. In December 2016, Wingate rejected Epps' request for home confinement, saying he would be held in jail until his sentencing, scheduled for May 2017. On May 24, 2017, Epps was sentenced to 325 months (27 years and 1 month) in federal prison. The prosecutor, Assistant U.S. Attorney for the Southern District of Mississippi, Darren LaMarca, recommended a sentence of 13 years due to the substantial cooperation Epps provided, which FBI agent Ty Breedlove characterized to the court as one of the best confidential sources in his career. Wingate responded that the gross value of the contracts Epps received kickbacks on was $868 million. By July 2017 Epps was moved to the Federal Correctional Institution in Seagoville, Texas.

As of February 2015, Epps was still eligible to receive benefits from the state Public Employees' Retirement System.

In April 2017, consultant Michael Goddard pleaded guilty to lying to the FBI in regards to a bribe he received from Health Assurance in connection with a jail health care contract for Jefferson County, Alabama. Goddard was scheduled to be sentenced on August 2, 2017, and faced up to five years in prison and a $250,000 fine. He is being held at the Federal Correctional Institution, Butner Low custody, North Carolina, with a scheduled release date of November 1, 2023.

Wingate recused himself from trying the Carl Reddix case, which was assigned to Chief Judge Daniel Jordan. In a plea bargain, on May 3, 2017, Reddix, who was accused of paying more than $170,000 in bribes, pleaded guilty to a single count of bribery. He was scheduled to be sentenced on August 1, 2017, and remained free on $10,000 bail, with his sentencing delayed until September. At issue is the amount of restitution for which he might be liable, with prosecutors recommending payment of $1.27 million. In October, the judge rejected his arguments and required him to pay the full amount demanded by prosecutors. Reddix was sentenced by Judge Jordan to six years in prison, plus two years of supervised release. He was fined $15,000 and required to forfeit more than $1.2 million. U.S. Attorney Mike Hurst said that Reddix had personally made 36 bribe payments to Epps over a three-year period. He reported to prison on January 29, 2018, and is being held at the Federal Correctional Institution, Butner 1 Medium custody, in North Carolina.

On August 18, 2019, the four Louisiana businessmen—Michael LeBlanc Sr.; his son, Michael Jr.; Tawasky L. Ventroy; and Jacque B. Jackson—agreed to plead guilty to certain charges, though the specifics were not released to the public. LeBlanc Sr. was the owner of LCS Correctional Services. He sold five jails to GEO Group for $305 million, with $298 million going to pay debts owed for the construction of those prisons. LeBlanc Sr. and his brother Patrick, who died in a plane crash, were involved in bribing a Bexar County, Texas sheriff and the sheriff's campaign manager, to obtain the contracts for phone and commissary services, though they were not prosecuted for it. After taking their guilty pleas, Wingate set aside February 10, 2019 for sentencing hearings against all four men.

The total number of defendants who pleaded guilty by May 7, 2017 stood at ten, plus the four from Louisiana who took pleas in 2019. In late May 2017, Assistant US Attorney LaMarca said that six or seven investigations remained open in Mississippi and Louisiana, and one more indictment was obtained but remains sealed.

== State legal issues ==
On February 8, 2017, Mississippi Attorney General Jim Hood announced he had filed civil cases against 15 corporations and numerous individuals who had engaged in contracts with the MDOC and Epps, and was seeking damages and punitive damages. Hood said "the state of Mississippi has been defrauded through a pattern of bribery, kickbacks, misrepresentations, fraud, concealment, money laundering and other wrongful conduct. These individuals and corporations that benefited by stealing from taxpayers must not only pay the state's losses, but state law requires that they must also forfeit and return the entire amount of the contracts paid by the state. We are also seeking punitive damages to punish these conspirators and to deter those who might consider giving or receiving kickbacks in the future". Besides Malone and Carl Reddix, the defendants included Michael Reddix; Andrew Jenkins; Management & Training Corporation; The GEO Group, Inc.; Cornell Companies, Inc.; Wexford Health Sources, Inc.; The Bantry Group Corporation; Admin Pros, L.L.C.; CGL Facility Management, LLC; Mississippi Correctional Management, Inc.; Branan Medical Corporation; Drug Testing Corporation; Global Tel*Link Corporation; Health Assurance, LLC; Keefe Commissary Network, LLC of St. Louis; Sentinel Offender Services, L.L.C.; and AJA Management & Technical Services, Inc.

In November 2017, Sentinel Offender Services LLC, which provides inmate electronic monitoring, settled its case which involved a $2 million contract for $1.3 million. Hood said his office by that time had retrieved $5.8 million on behalf of Mississippi taxpayers. However, GEO Group, formerly Wackenhut Corrections, which operated many MDOC prisons between 1994 and 2012, continued to fight the charges. GEO Vice President for corporate relations, Pablo Paez, stated that "during [their] entire tenure as a service provider to the State, our company was never aware of or involved in any improprieties within the Mississippi Department of Corrections".

In February 2018, Hood cited the Epps corruption when opposing passage of legislation in the state house that would make it more difficult for the state to have remedies for behavior involving fraud or corruption, noting "corporations have just flat got [the state's] Legislature doing their bidding". He said the bill would "protect crooks and scam artists by gutting the Consumer Protection Act. They would not only block future cases, but would also be used to slow down or block late-stage pending cases."

On May 18, 2017, Hood announced that the state had made the first settlement against Alere Inc., which had purchased Branan Medical Corporation and paid $2 million to the state. On January 24, 2019, Hood announced that his office recovered $27 million from the vendors whom he filed suits against. Management and Training Corporation finally settled the state's suit to recover funds and paid $5.2 million. GEO Group paid $4.6 million, with the named defendant being Cornell Companies, which had been purchased by GEO in 2010. Wexford Health Sources Inc. paid $4 million. Keefe Commissary Network and C. N. W. Construction Company both paid $3.1 million each. $750,000 was paid by CGL Facility Management, which provides maintenance services. $32,188 was paid by Admin Pros LLC, a Medicaid billing service. Insurance agent Guy E. “Butch” Evans paid $100,000.

As of late January 2019, eight lawsuits in bribery schemes were still pending. Hood accused at least 10 individuals and 12 out-of-state corporations of using so-called "consultants" to fix more than $800 million in Mississippi prison contracts. Subsequently, two more corporations settled those suits. As he left office, Hood published a list of enumerated recoveries of $26,612,188.22 from complicit corporations. Global Tel*Link Corporation an inmate phone provider, settled for $2.500,000 million. Health Assurance, LLC, a correctional health care provider went bankrupt so no settlement was obtained. On May 19, 2020, the Mississippi appeals court ruled against Epps and his wife Catherjean who had litigated against paying $69,489, their tax liabilities for the years 2007-2014, that had been retroactively assessed on those ill-gotten gains emanating from the later discovery of the bribery schemes.
