= Marcus Mann (basketball) =

American Southern Baptist minister (born 1973)

Personal information
- Born: December 19, 1973 (age 52) Carthage, Mississippi, U.S.
- Listed height: 6 ft 8 in (2.03 m)
- Listed weight: 245 lb (111 kg)

Career information
- High school: South Leake (Walnut Grove, Mississippi)
- College: East Central CC (1992–1994); Mississippi Valley State (1994–1996)
- NBA draft: 1996: 2nd round, 40th overall pick
- Drafted by: Golden State Warriors
- Position: Power forward

Career highlights
- NCAA rebounding leader (1996); SWAC Player of the Year (1996)
- Stats at NBA.com
- Stats at Basketball Reference

Marcus Lashaun Mann (born December 19, 1973) is an American former college basketball player who attended Mississippi Valley State University. He became a Southern Baptist minister.

== Early life ==
Mann was born in Carthage, Mississippi, to parents Annie Mann Gray and Jim Banks Jr. and was a very active member in his Baptist church while growing up. Mann attended South Leake High School where he was noted for both his athletic and academic abilities – he graduated as his class's salutatorian and was named a top five basketball player in the state of Mississippi.

== Basketball career ==
=== Community college ===
Mann was awarded a scholarship to play basketball at East Central Community College. During his two-year career he averaged approximately 21 points and 12 rebounds per game. Mann then signed a full athletic scholarship to play his remaining two seasons of NCAA eligibility at Mississippi Valley State University.

Later in life, Mann would also get inducted into ECCC's Academic and Athletic Halls of Fame.

=== Mississippi Valley State ===
During the 1994–95 and 1995–96 seasons, Mann's two at MVSU, he appeared in 56 total games while averaging 19.3 points and 12.7 rebounds per game. During his senior season he guided the Delta Devils to a school record 22–7 record, a share of the Southwestern Athletic Conference (SWAC) regular season title, the SWAC Tournament championship and MVSU's third-ever berth into the NCAA Division I Tournament. He averaged 21.7 points and 13.6 rebounds per game that season, and his rebounding ability was good enough to lead Division I. Mann was also named the SWAC Player of the Year and was the first player from MVSU to earn that honor.

== Later life ==
In June 1996, one month after graduating magna cum laude, the Golden State Warriors selected him as the 11th pick in the second round (40th overall) in the NBA draft. Between the NBA Draft and the first days of the Warriors' training camp, Mann's desire to play basketball faded away. He felt that he had a higher calling in life, which was working with children as a Baptist minister. On October 31, the day before the Warriors were set to open their season against the Los Angeles Clippers, Mann told the organization that he did not want to play professional basketball and that it would be unfair to both himself and the team to keep going.

Golden State released him, and Mann was no longer an NBA player. He sacrificed, minimally, the $220,000 rookie salary along with the glamour of an NBA lifestyle to pursue his calling.
