= American Correctional Association =

Private non-profit trade association

American Correctional Association logo

The American Correctional Association (ACA; called the National Prison Association before 1954) is a private, non-profit, non-governmental trade association and accrediting body for the corrections industry, the oldest and largest such association in the world. The organization was founded in 1870 and has a significant place in the history of prison reform in the U.S.

ACA accredits over 900 prisons, jails, community residential centers (halfway houses), and various other corrections facilities in the U.S. and internationally, using their independently published standards manuals. Approximately 80 percent of all U.S. state departments of corrections and youth services are active participants. Also included are programs and facilities operated by the Federal Bureau of Prisons and the private sector.

Shane Bauer of Mother Jones wrote that the ACA functions as "the closest thing [the United States has] to a national regulatory body for prisons" in addition to being the American correctional industry's trade association. According to its website, the ACA has more than 5,000 members.

== History ==
The ACA was founded under the name National Prison Association. The driving creative force was Enoch Cobb Wines, a minister and reformer who organized an 1870 congress in Cleveland, hoping to introduce the principles of the progressive New York Prison Association to a national stage. Former U.S. President Rutherford B. Hayes served as the organization's first president in 1883. Hayes "missed no opportunity to speak with well-informed sincerity about more effective and more humane ways of dealing with offenders". He remained president until his death ten years later.

Roeliff Brinkerhoff, an Ohio publisher, political figure, and frequent Hayes ally, succeeded Hayes as the association president. For the next twenty years, Brinkerhoff used the NPA as a platform to pursue basic correctional reforms such as the separation of state and federal prison systems, and the idea of parole, then a relatively new concept. With Brinkerhoff's influence, the state of Ohio passed a state parole law in 1885, the nation's first.

The organization's name was officially changed in 1954 to more accurately reflect the organization's philosophy and scope.

ACA began exploring the feasibility of accrediting its members in the 1960s, funded in part by a sizable 1969 grant from the Ford Foundation. In May 1974, the ACA created its "Commission on Accreditation for Corrections" in a meeting chaired by Walter Dunbar, a New York corrections figure known for his spokesman role at the Attica Prison riot. (The ACA maintains an annual achievement award in his honor.) In 1979, the Vienna Correctional Center, operated by the Illinois Department of Corrections, became the first accredited adult correctional institution.

In 2011, ACA began to branch out, and it audited the first detention facilities outside of the U.S. or Canada. In January 2012 four Mexican facilities became accredited by ACA, using their Core International Standards manual.

During the COVID-19 pandemic in 2021, ACA received a $99,540 grant from Pfizer to promote uptake of their COVID-19 vaccine.

=== Conferences ===
ACA hosts bi-annual conferences in different cities around the U.S. The first conference is the "ACA Winter Conference" with the year included in the title before ACA. It holds its second annual conference, the Congress of Correction, during the summer. Notable speakers at ACA conferences have included Jelly Roll Misty Copeland General Richard Myers, Congressman Danny Davis, presidential campaign director Donna Brazile, presidential candidate and commentator Pat Buchanan, covert CIA agent Valerie Plame and her husband, Ambassador Joseph Wilson, TV anchor Laurie Dhue, political analyst Charlie Cook, and Rear Admiral Boris Lushniak.

== E.R. Cass Award ==
The American Correctional Association bestows the E.R. Cass Correctional Achievement Award every year for "service above self and above and beyond the call of duty."

E.R. Cass Award Winners
Year	Awardees
2025	Annette Chambers-Smith Bryan Collier Jeffrey Washington
2024	Arthur F. “Art” Beeler Douglas “Doug” Dretke
2023	Gary C. Mohr Viola Riggin Derrick D. Schofield Michelle Staples-Horne, MD, MS, MPH
2022	Damon Hininger Anadora “Andie” Moss
2021	Dr. Dean Aufderheide Tony Wilkes
2019	Dave Donahue Mary Livers, Ph.D.
2018	Patricia Caruso Daron Hall
2017	James A. Gondles, Jr.
2016	David Haasenritter Odie Washington
2015	Elizabeth F. Gondles, Ph.D. Brad Livingston
2014	Harold W. Clarke Denise Robinson
2013	Mark and Barbara Inch Patrick W. Keohane
2012	Nathan “Burl” Cain Gary D. Maynard
2011	Lannette Linthicum, M.D. Richard Seiter
2010	Harly Lappin Larry Norris
2009	Albert Murray Thomas Stickrath
2008	Rev. Anthony J. Bruno Arthur Leonardo
2007	Charles J. Kehoe Maryann Saar
2006	Walter Ridley S. Anne Walker
2005	Glenn S. Goord Charlotte A. Nesbitt
2004	Betty Adams Green Geno Natalucci-Persichetti
2003	Sister Margaret Graziano Michael Quinlan
2002	Denis Shumate Richard Stalder
2001	Joseph D. Lehman Virginia Swanson
2000	Anabel P. Mitchell Reginald A. Wilkinson
1999	Gwendolyn Chunn Mary Q. Hawkes George M. Phyfer
1998	Judy C. Anderson Dennis S. Avery Bobbie L. Huskey
1997	Kathleen M. Hawk David M. Parrish T.A. Ryan
1996	Lee Roy Black, Ed.D. W. Hardy Rauch Samuel F. Saxton
1995	Robert Brown Jr. W. Raymond Nelson Donald M. Page
1994	Thomas A. Coughlin III Parker Evatt Michael J. Mahoney Victoria C. Myers
1993	The Honorable Helen G. Corrothers Gail D. Hughes Morris L. Thigpen
1992	Joseph R. Rowan Harry K. Singletary Jr. Edward F. Tripp
1991	Sidney J. Folse Anthony P. Travisono Diana N. Travisono Donald R. Yeomans
1990	Donald G. Evans Ronald G. Jackson Ruth L. Rushen
1989	Su Cunningham Gary Hill Robert Watson
1988	David C. Evans James D. Henderson Linda D’Amario Rossi
1987	T. Don Hutto Perry Johnson
1986	Albert Elias J. Bryan Riley Ernest D. Wright
1985	Bennett J. Cooper Vernon G. Housewright Joann B. Morton, Ph.D. Carl Robinson
1984	Norman F. Chamberlain Lane Murray, Ph.D. C. Winston Tanksley
1983	John J. Moran Amos E. Reed Paul A. Skelton Jr.
1982	John W. Braithwaite Marcella C. Rapp Samuel Sublett Jr.
1981	Norman A. Carlson Joseph S. Coughlin William D. Leeke Robert E. Rodli
1980	Donald D. Brewer George G. Killinger, Ph.D. Peter P. Lejins, Ph.D.
1979	Anthony S. Kuharich Ellis C. MacDougall Rev. Winfred C. Ollenburg Ross V. Randolph
1978	John Burke Henry J. Mascarello Lt. Col. Harry W. Poole
1977	W. James Estelle Jr. Thomas J. Mangogna Martha E. Wheeler
1976	Allen F. Breed Herman G. Moeller Louie L. Wainwright
1975	Walter Dunbar Albert G. Fraser John A. Gavin
1974	Wayne K. Patterson E. Preston Sharp, Ph.D., and Catherine Simons Sharp Maurice H. Sigler
1973	Edward W. Grout Parker L. Hancock Russell G. Oswald
1972	George J. Beto, Ph.D. Charles P. Chew Fred T. Wilkinson
1971	Myrl E. Alexander Sanger B. Powers Joseph E. Ragen
1970	Arthur T. Prasse Harry C. Tinsley Roberts J. Wright
1969	William T. Coulter James A. McLaughlin Gilbert Rodli
1968	Reed Cozart Lt. Col. Carl R. Dueill Gen. John F. McMahon
1967	William H. Bannan J. P. Shalloo, Ph.D. W. Frank Smith Jr.
1966	Fred R. Dickson Marion H. Vedder
1965	Garrett Heyns, Ph.D. Austin H. MacCormick Leon T. Stern
1964	Sanford Bates James V. Bennett Norman Fenton, Ph.D.
1963	Edna Mahan Richard A. Mcgee G. Howland Shaw

== Executives ==
- Executive director: Robert Green
- Deputy executive director: Jeffery Washington, Retired June 2025
- President: Ricky Dixon, CBHC/CO/Adult
- President-elect: Tyrone Oliver
- Vice president: Bryan Collier
- Treasurer: Anthony O. Vann
- Board of governors representatives to the executive committee: Marina Cadreche and Latera Davis

== Past presidents ==
- Joseph F. Scott (1900–?) – After serving as the warden of the Elmira state prison, Scott became the superintendent of prisons of the state of New York. In 1900, Scott was elected president of the ACA., predecessor National Prison Association.
- Terrell Don Hutto (1984–2000) – While Hutto was president, the ACA, began to support the private prison system.
- Harold W. Clarke (2008–2010) – Clarke directed corrections in Nebraska, Washington State, Massachusetts, and was the director of corrections for the Commonwealth of Virginia from 2010 to 2023.
- Daron Hall (2011–2013) – The Sheriff of Davidson County, Tennessee, Hall previously managed a Brisbane, Australia, prison for the Corrections Corporation of America
- Christopher B. Epps (2013–2014) – Known for improvements of the Mississippi State Penitentiary, reductions in the use of solitary confinement, and successful early release of more non-violent offenders under parole, Epps served as Commissioner of the Mississippi Department of Corrections for more than a decade and under three governors. In November 2014 he was indicted for eight federal charges of money laundering and taking $1.47 million in bribes and kickbacks from prison contractors and vendors; he resigned as A.C.A. president and Mississippi Commissioner of Corrections, pleaded guilty, and turned state's evidence. On May 25, 2017, Judge Henry Travillion Wingate gave him a federal prison sentence of 235 months (19.6 years). Wingate, who was appointed to the federal bench in 1985 said, "This is the largest graft operation that certainly I have seen, and I have seen a lot." By July 2017 Epps was serving his sentence at the Federal Correctional Institution, Seagoville in Seagoville, Texas.
- Mary L. Livers (2014–2015) Former Deputy Secretary (agency head) of the Louisiana Office of Juvenile Justice. Previously Deputy Secretary for Operations of the Maryland Department of Public Safety and Corrections.
- Dr. Lannette C. Linthicum (2017-2019) Director Texas Department of Criminal Justice Health Services Division
- Gary C. Mohr (2019-2021) Director Ohio Department of Rehabilitation and Correction, 2010-2018
- Tony C. Parker (2021-2023) Commissioner Tennessee Department of Corrections 2016-2021
- Denise M. Robinson (2023-2025) President and CEO of Alvis, Inc. 2005–Present

== Controversies ==
=== Value of accreditation ===
In 1982, a 72-year-old senior judge of the United States Court of Appeals for the District of Columbia, Judge David L. Bazelon, resigned from the governing panel of the ACA with a 21-page statement of criticism. Bazelon had three years remaining on his five-year term. He described its lack of transparency and accountability, its apparent willingness to bend to political influence, and its dual role as a trade group and accreditor. Bazelon pointed out the apparent conflict of interest, writing, "How can the commission in good conscience represent itself as 'independent' and 'unbiased' while being financially dependent on the objects of its scrutiny?"

Bazelon also pointed out that ACA inspection teams at the Menard Correctional Center in Illinois, for example, did not even contact U.S. District Court Judge James L. Foreman, who had found the medical care so poor as to violate the constitution, and did not contact Dr. Lambert King, the special master Judge Foreman had appointed in 1980 to oversee the mandated improvements before they filed their approving reports.

Later critics have named several other institutions that retained their ACA accreditations while outside parties found grave violence and/or court-ordered reforms. These include:

- the private Otter Creek Correctional Center owned by CoreCivic in Floyd County, Kentucky, accredited in 2009 despite multiple charges of sexual abuse that caused the state of Hawaii to remove its inmates and the prison to be closed
- the Idaho State Correctional Center, in Kuna, operated by CoreCivic, which retained its good grades from ACA throughout a long proven pattern of violence in the prison, understaffing, operator contract fraud, and multiple federal investigations
- the private Walnut Grove Correctional Facility in Mississippi, operated by Cornell Corrections which corporation was purchased in 2010 by GEO Group, accredited in 2012 when it was a juvenile facility, the same year U.S. District Court Judge Carlton W. Reeves described it as "a cesspool of unconstitutional and inhuman acts"

=== Executives ===
==== Christopher B. Epps ====
On November 5, 2014, Christopher B. Epps resigned from his position as ACA president, shortly before the announcement of his indictments on dozens of corruption charges. Epps had been identified by a federal investigation conducted by the United States District Court for the Southern District of Mississippi called Operation Mississippi Hustle. He'd taken $1.47 million in kickbacks, from 16 corporations, for his role in awarding nearly $1 billion worth of private prison contracts. Epps also resigned from his full-time job as Corrections Commissioner for the state of Mississippi on the same day.

Epps pleaded guilty to money laundering and filing false tax returns. Many vendors were indicted, some pleaded guilty, one committed suicide, and eleven more suspects faced criminal bribery charges. The Assistant U.S. Attorney estimated the corruption's net benefit to prison contractors exceeded $65 million. Epps personally received at least the bribes for steering what Assistant U.S. Attorney Darren LaMarca had first estimated at $800 million in contracts between 2006 and 2014. Presiding Federal judge, Henry Travillion Wingate heard the cases of the others who were charged with bribing Epps.

Irb Benjamin was charged with bribery of Epps in connection with the contractual drug and alcohol treatment his company provided to MDOC prisons. Benjamin's indictment was announced on August 22, 2015. He was paid at least $862,000 to acquire and maintain ACA accreditation for jails in numerous counties. Passing ACA standards was required if they were to be awarded contracts to hold state prisoners.

Benjamin had represented Alcorn County as a Democrat in the state House from 1976 to 1980 and state Senate from 1984 to 1992, later working for the Republican Lieutenant Governor. Alcorn County paid Benjamin, the president and lobbyist for Mississippi Correctional Management (MCM), $114,000 a year, although he lived more than 200 miles away. The Alcorn Board of Supervisors attorney said the supervisors had not been required to seek bids before giving Benjamin the contract as warden because it was a contract for services, which are exempt from bid laws.

Benjamin had received $5,000 a month to handle accreditation by the American Correctional Association for Alcorn's Regional Correctional Facility, and he had received another $4,500 a month as the jail's warden. Benjamin had formed MCM in 1996, when the state Department of Corrections and counties started hiring private contractors to operate prisons and smaller regional jails. It operated the Grenada County jail for years. Benjamin said the company also has jail accreditation contracts worth $4,000 or $5,000 a month with other counties including Chickasaw, Hancock, Holmes, Marion, Pearl River, Washington, and Yazoo. Prior to that he worked as a $3,000-a-month jail consultant for DeSoto County.

On June 8, 2008, DeSoto County Board of Supervisors supervisors approved the contract saying, "Mr. Benjamin was recommended by Commissioner Epps at the state level." On November 25, 2014, Benjamin said that he was not aware of the Epps recommendation.

Benjamin pleaded guilty to federal charges on October 18, 2016. He faced 10 years in prison, plus a fine of up to $250,000. Federal presiding Judge Wingate sentenced Benjmain to 70 months in prison, fined Benjamin $100,000, and ordered him to forfeit $260,782.

Benjamin, who said he was "pressured", estimated he had paid Epps between $180,000 and $225,000 in cash bribes to secure support for the regional jails. His plea covered bribes that had been paid for drug and alcohol rehabilitation programs that his company ran. LaMarca told Wingate, "it's just a matter of time" until others whom Benjamin informed upon are indicted.

On May 25, 2017, Epps received a federal prison sentence of almost 20 years. Judge Wingate, who had been appointed to the federal bench in 1985, said, "This is the largest graft operation that certainly I have seen, and I have seen a lot." Wingate cited the burglary of his former Flowood home by Epps as the reason why he gave a sentence that was much longer than the 13-year sentence recommended by prosecutors.

Epps is being held at the Federal Correctional Institution, Seagoville in Texas, near Dallas. He is due to be released on November 25, 2033.

==== James A. Gondles Jr. ====
James A. Gondles Jr. became the executive director of ACA in 1990, after serving as the sheriff of Arlington County, Virginia. Court records indicate a long history of suits and allegations of mistreating his staff. Gondles was accused of sexual harassment, "acts of abuse of power", fraternizing and having sex with female deputies, bullying top aides, and targeting Arlington County employees who supported his opponent during his 1987 campaign for sheriff. In 1988, while he was serving as Sheriff of Arlington County, the Citizens for Law and Constitution alleged that Gondles had performed "acts of abuse and power" as sheriff, such as bullying aides and bragging about having sex with female deputies. Also in 1988 Gondles settled a sexual harassment suit, brought by a female deputy, with a $25,000 payment and a public apology.

== See also ==
- Incarceration in the United States
