= Chris Epps =

American criminal justice employee and bribery convict

President of the American Correctional Association
- In office May 2010 – November 5, 2014

Commissioner of the Mississippi Department of Corrections
- In office August 30, 2002 – 2014

Personal details
- Born: Christopher B. Epps; January 25, 1961 (age 65) Tchula, Mississippi, U.S.
- Spouse: Catherlean Sanders
- Children: 2
- Education: Mississippi Valley State University; Liberty University

Military service
- Allegiance: United States
- Branch/service: United States Army National Guard
- Rank: Major
- Unit: Mississippi National Guard
- Criminal information
- Status: Incarcerated
- Penalty: 235 months

Details
- Imprisoned at: Federal Correctional Institution, Seagoville

Christopher B. Epps (born January 25, 1961) is a federal inmate and a former commissioner of the Mississippi Department of Corrections (MDOC) and career employee in the state criminal justice system. Appointed as Commissioner in 2002 and serving until 2014, he served under three governors and was the agency's longest-serving commissioner in its history. Epps came up within the department as a 32-year career employee.

Although MDOC had been sued in two class-action suits in the 21st century on behalf of prisoners because of poor conditions, Epps was respected for his efforts to improve conditions by reducing the use of solitary confinement in Mississippi, reducing the prison population by supporting earlier parole for non-violent offenders and establishing halfway houses for newly released inmates. Beginning in the late 20th century, Mississippi contracted with for-profit prison companies to run several of its prisons as did many other states.

Epps was the only black American who was head of a state department under Governor Bryant. Epps had been elected president of the American Correctional Association in 2010. He resigned on November 5, 2014, during the federal investigation and after resigning as commissioner of the state system. It was the day before he was indicted on federal charges of bribery and kickbacks. He had received what may have been more than $2 million in bribes from Cecil McCrory, a businessman and former Mississippi Republican state house member and others, including Robert Simmons. The FBI termed the case Operation Mississippi Hustle. McCrory was most recently a consultant for Management and Training Corporation (MTC) of Utah, a major for-profit prison operating company; at the time, it had a $60 million contract in Mississippi to operate four prisons.

In February 2017, Mississippi Attorney General Jim Hood announced he had filed civil cases for damages and punitive damages against 11 corporations and individuals who had engaged in contracts with the MDOC and Epps. He said that state law required the companies and consultants to pay back the value of their contracts.

Pleaded guilty	Sentenced	Sentence	Started serving	Current location
February 25, 2015	February 3, 2017	235 months	November 1, 2016	Federal Correctional Institution, Seagoville, Texas

== Early life and education ==
Christopher Epps was born and grew up in Tchula, Mississippi, in Holmes County, which is bordered on the west by the Yazoo River and the Mississippi Delta. His family was deeply involved in education and several members had PhDs. Epps attended Mississippi Valley State University and received a bachelor's degree in elementary education.

Epps has said that, at the time of his graduation, he filled out an MDOC job application at a job fair at his university. Epps' relatives worked in the education sector and had post-graduate degrees. He expected to have a career in education, too.

He started working at a school in Drew, Mississippi, teaching science and mathematics. In 1982 MDOC contacted him asking if he was interested in working in prisons. Epps earned a master's degree in guidance counseling from Liberty University.

== Career ==
By 1982 Epps thought the criminal justice system might provide more opportunity for career advancement than education. At first he worked both as a teacher outside and as a prison correctional officer in Unit 29 at the Mississippi State Penitentiary (Parchman) in Sunflower County, Mississippi. In January 1985 he began working there as a disciplinary hearings officer. Around July of that year he quit his teaching position and devoted himself to Parchman, and at that time he became a case manager there.

He began to be promoted to higher positions within the corrections department. He served as Chief of Security and Corrections Case Management Supervisor. In December 1988 Governor Ray Mabus appointed Epps as the deputy superintendent of Mississippi State Penitentiary. He was responsible for security and running day-to-day prison operations. He also served as the MDOC's Chief of Staff, Deputy Commissioner of Institutions, Deputy Commissioner of Community Corrections, Director of Offender Services and Director of Treatment Services.

In July 2002 the ACLU filed a class action suit against MDOC and the officials of Parchman Penitentiary, saying that conditions for inmates on Death Row in Unit 32 constituted "cruel and unusual punishment" as prohibited by the US Constitution. On August 30, 2002, Democratic Governor Ronnie Musgrove appointed Epps as Commissioner of the Mississippi Department of Corrections. Republican governors Haley Barbour and Phil Bryant reappointed Epps on January 13, 2004, and January 11, 2012, respectively.

In 2006, Epps agreed to enter into a consent decree with the ACLU, working with them to reform Unit 32 particularly. He invited teams from Connecticut and reviewed the classification system, seeking to develop a better way to reward prisoners who modeled desired behavior. Controls at Unit 32 were lessened, group dining and classes were introduced. During the next four years, programs were developed whereby prisoners could earn their way out of solitary confinement through good behavior. By the fall of 2007, the prison population in solitary confinement was reduced from more than 1,000 to 150. Incidents of violence decreased dramatically. Many prisoners in the facility were held there because they had HIV or mental illness. The state worked to transfer them to other facilities.

In 2010, Epps continued to work with the ACLU to close Unit 32, moving prisoners with severe mental illness from Unit 32 to the East Mississippi Correctional Facility, intended to provide more intensive treatment for such prisoners.

In 2008, Epps gained support from state senator Willie Lee Simmons for legislation to amend the state's "truth in sentencing law"; the new law, signed by the governor in 2009, made nonviolent offenders eligible for parole after serving 25 percent of their sentences. (The previous law had required all convicted felons to serve at least 85 percent of their sentence, resulting in a dramatic expansion of the number of prisoners in the state, to 22,800 by 2007.) The law was retroactive. From 2009 to 2010 the Parole Board reviewed cases to determine prisoners eligible for parole. They were aided by use of a science-based "risk instrument" to evaluate prisoners' risk of recidivism. The state released more than 3,000 felons on parole who had been convicted of non-violent crimes. None has committed the type of high-profile crimes that has damaged such efforts in other states. This policy also saved the state money. Epps was respected for his efforts to reduce the use of solitary confinement in prisons throughout the state.

By 2014, Epps was making a $132,700-a-year salary. He was the only African American heading a state department in Governor Bryant's administration.

Serving in the Mississippi National Guard since 1984, Epps was promoted to a rank of lieutenant colonel before his March 2008 retirement. Epps worked as an auditor for the American Correctional Association (ACA). In May 2010 he was elected as the association's president, with a term through February 2015. He was also elected as president of the Association of State Correctional Administrators (ASCA), taking office in August 2014. On November 5, 2014, Epps resigned from his ACA position, the day before his indictment was announced.

== Personal life ==
Epps's wife is Catherlean Sanders and they have two sons. Prior to 2015, Epps's primary residence was in Flowood, Mississippi, in the Jackson metropolitan area. He served as a deacon of Hanging Moss Road Church of Christ in Jackson.

At one time he owned a condominium in Biloxi, but later replaced it with a condominium in Pass Christian, Mississippi.

In April 2015, Epps' wife hired a Seattle forfeiture attorney to represent her in regard to the case involving their Flowood residence. On March 2, 2016, the court allowed her to keep $200,000 of their forfeited assets.

== Legal issues ==
On November 6, 2014, the office of the United States Attorney for the Southern District of Mississippi announced that it had indicted Epps on corruption charges; these charges were related to his dealings with the for-profit prison industry. The federal indictment stated that Cecil McCrory, a Republican former state House member from 1988 to 1994 and a businessman who served as the chairperson of the Rankin County School District's Board of Education, paid Epps kickbacks and bribes totaling more than $1 million. His payments included payment of part of the mortgage of Epps' primary residence in the Jackson area. Epps leveraged the resulting increased equity together with another bribe payment to buy a condominium; he later traded up the latter for a larger, more expensive condo.

In exchange, Epps directed contracts to McCrory-owned companies, such as a no-bid contract to his G.T. Enterprises, which provided commissary services, as well as to companies that hired McCrory as a paid consultant. Per the indictment, the activity started in 2007 and ended on March 12, 2014. Epps entered an initial plea of not guilty, and he received a bond of $25,000. According to Leake County Sheriff Greg Waggoner, the investigation was initiated after an attempt by MDOC to cover up a sexual assault of an inmate of a halfway facility in Walnut Grove, Mississippi. The FBI launched an investigation which eventually focused on Epps, naming it "Mississippi Hustle".

In November 2014 Governor Phil Bryant ordered rebids of the contracts that had been awarded by Epps. To review existing contracts, he appointed a five-member task force, which included Mike Moore, a Democrat. Moore was Mississippi's Attorney General from 1988 to 2004. During the mid-1990s, he served on a board that oversaw prison construction projects authorized after the state was sued because of overcrowding and substandard conditions. Mississippi also was beginning to use for-profit contractors to operate some prisons, some of which were privately owned by such contractors. Bryant had received a $1,000 campaign contribution from McCrory. After learning of the indictments, he donated this money to the Salvation Army.

In February 2015 Epps pleaded guilty to corruption-related charges in a plea bargain: one count of filing a false tax return and one count of conspiracy to launder money. As part of the plea, he forfeited two Mercedes-Benz vehicles and his two residences. In an allocution, he told the presiding Federal judge, Henry Travillion Wingate, "I'm sorry for what I've done." "I've repented before God. I apologize to my family and the state of Mississippi."

Epps said he began taking gratuities from McCrory in 1997, before he became commissioner and while McCrory was still a state legislator. As of February 2015, Epps was still eligible to receive benefits from the Mississippi Public Employees’ Retirement System.

McCrory plea-bargained to lesser federal charges. He had long worked as a consultant to prison contractors: first to Cornell Companies of Houston, Texas, which built and operated the Walnut Grove Youth Correctional Facility in Mississippi, and the GEO Group (which acquired Cornell). Last McCrory advised GEO's successor, Utah's Management and Training Corporation. In 2015 MTC held a $60 million contract to operate four Mississippi prisons, including Wilkinson County Correctional Facility, which had previously been operated by the Corrections Corporation of America, now known as CoreCivic.

Upon the disclosure of the indictments, MTC fired McCrory, claiming they knew nothing of his criminal activities. According to the indictments, MTC confirmed that it paid McCrory $12,000 a month and had hired him at Epps’ recommendation. The company said that Epps had not forced it to hire McCrory. MTC spokesman Issa Arnita said that Epps “made us aware of the fee McCrory had charged in the past to other contractors” and that McCrory had worked for GEO Group, the Boca Raton, Florida, for-profit prison firm, which had previously held the contracts in Mississippi that MTC was awarded. "MTC was not aware of any alleged inappropriate relationships between Mr. Epps and Mr. McCrory or that Mr. Epps was allegedly a participant in any way in the contract with McCrory."

The indictment recounted a 2012 conversation between Epps and McCrory, quoting Epps as telling McCrory that he had persuaded MTC to hire him, and they were to split MTC's payments after taxes. According to the indictment, Epps said, “I got us $12,000 per month.”

Epps and McCrory blamed each other for beginning the bribery scheme. Their sentencing was first scheduled for June 9, 2015, but a day earlier, the U.S. Attorney for the Southern District of Mississippi said the sentencing was indefinitely delayed, as prosecutors were pursuing additional indictments.

The federal government indicted many others of those who allegedly bribed Epps, such as Mark Longoria, CEO of Drug Testing Corporation of Houston, Texas, who pleaded guilty in August 2016. He was sentenced to five years in prison and fined $368,000 and ordered to forfeit $131,000 on February 14, 2017. He is being held at Federal Correctional Institution, Forrest City, Arkansas, with an anticipated release date of September 13, 2021.

Also charged were consultant Robert A. Simmons, and Teresa Malone, the wife of the former Mississippi House Corrections Committee chairman, Democrat Bennett Malone. In August 2016, the indictment of Guy E. "Butch" Evans was announced.

In 2012 Evans had been awarded a contract as the insurance broker of record for the Mississippi Department of Corrections. He was given exclusive access to MDOC employees to sell policies and products. He received commissions from insurance companies and kicked back $1,400 to $1,700 per month to Epps for 16 months, starting in January 2013. The Evans arrangement ended with the Epps indictment. Wingate initially rescheduled the trial until April 3, 2017, for Evans. On March 31, 2018, it was announced that Evans would waive indictment and plead guilty to a lesser offense, one that had not yet been charged.

On January 9, 2017, Teresa Malone's trial was delayed, as she had suffered complications from a double lung transplant. On July 17, Malone changed her plea to guilty of the charges that involved her furnishing bribes, in amounts of $1000 to $1,750 to Epps through McCrory, in return for the continuance of the medical services vendor monitoring and Medicaid eligibility contracting which the state had with AdminPros, LLC. She was scheduled to be sentenced in September 2017. On January 9, 2018, the day before she was to be sentenced, Judge Wingate indefinitely delayed her sentencing due to her new hospitalization for additional transplant complications. On May 25, 2019, Malone was sentenced by Wingate to 41 months in prison and a $250,000 fine. She is being held at the Federal Medical Center, Carswell, Texas, near Dallas, she was released from federal custody on January 11, 2022.

In April 2016, McCrory informed the court that he wanted to withdraw his plea bargain and change his plea to "not guilty", requesting a trial. As a consequence, the judge postponed Epps' sentencing to July 18, 2016. The sentencing of Epps and Brandon businessman McCrory scheduled for July 19, 2016, was delayed by Judge Wingate to give their defense lawyers additional time to review materials concerning how much money was gained by the 15 corporations paying bribes to the pair. Prosecutors hoped to use the evidence to increase the recommended prison sentences for Epps and McCrory. Epps faced a possible 23 years after his 2015 guilty plea to money laundering and filing false tax returns related to $1.47 million in bribes.

Numerous companies have denied knowing their consultants were making kickbacks to Epps and others. GEO's Finance Director John Tyrell testified that, "We often have consultants..." GEO had been paying McCrory $5,000 monthly, which retired president and Chief Operating Officer Wayne Calabrese subsequently doubled to $10,000. Two suits had been filed against the company based on conditions prevailing at the prison.

According to Assistant U.S. Attorney Darren LaMarca, eleven more people could face criminal charges in the Epps bribery cases. Ten could face federal indictments; another could face state charges, which were expected to be filed by mid-July 2017. LaMarca estimated that the corruption's net benefit to contractors exceeded $65 million. Investigators have determined that Epps demanded bribes to exercise his influence, not only at the state level, but also among county supervisors. By controlling the placement of state inmates in county facilities, Epps had influence over local jails. In poor rural areas, these were often considered a source of employment by local residents.

Cecil McCrory originally pleaded guilty to a single count of money laundering conspiracy and faced up to 20 years in prison. He agreed to forfeit $1.7 million in assets. Based on the prosecutors' $65 million estimate, federal sentencing guidelines would recommend a maximum of 23 years in prison for Epps. However, his lawyer asked the judge to sentence Epps based only on the value of the bribes he collected. If the lower amount of $1.47 million is used, Epps faced a recommended sentence between 14 and 17 1/2 years, giving Judge Wingate latitude. Because of his cooperation in providing information about those paying the bribes, prosecutors agreed to recommend that Epps get a shorter sentence. Quantifying assumed benefits to 16 contractors necessitated examining their accounts. On June 30, 2016, John Colette, Epps' defense attorney, said he received more than 1,500 pages of documents in the previous week and would require at least 30 days to review them. Four companies are asking Wingate to shield their information from public view: Four more had delayed responded to subpoenas. Wingate said he would hold a hearing by July 16, 2016, to consider requests for protective orders, and to consider contempt orders be lodged against companies which have failed to respond to disclosure requests.

Judge Wingate reset Epps' sentencing for May 24–25, 2017. Although Epps' sentencing was delayed, Wingate had set sentencing for his co-defendant, McCrory, for Dec. 21–22. On December 21, 2016, Judge Wingate rejected McCrory's request to withdraw his plea, ruling it had been made with sufficient advice of counsel, and setting a new date for sentencing. It was revealed via testimony from the FBI that McCrory admitted to laundering $40,000 in cash for Epps in their first interview with him, and that he began wearing a recording device for his conversations with Epps. McCrory remained free on bail with sentencing proceedings held on February 2–3, 2017. Issues centered on how much consideration he should receive for his cooperation, including his recording of conversations with other participants in the schemes. After he was sentenced to 8 1/2 years, on February 3, McCrory continued free on bail, with the judge indicating that time could be reduced after the other defendants in the case are sentenced. McCrory's sentencing was postponed numerous times, with his attorney disputing the fine Judge Wingate intended to impose.

GEO had been paying McCrory $5,000 monthly, which President and Chief Operating Officer Wayne Calabrese, who retired in 2011, subsequently doubled. GEO's Finance Director Tyrrell did not give a definitive answer to the question regarding why the amount had increased. He speculated, however, that it might have been because on August 10, 2010, GEO Group bought out Cornell Companies operations. Cornell operated the troubled Walnut Grove Youth Correctional Facility, where it had been accused in a lawsuit of prisoner mistreatment. Its settlement included conversion of the prison to adults-only. McCrory remained free on bail, with sentencing proceedings postponed three times in 2017. Disputed issues concerned how much consideration he should receive for his cooperation, including his recording of conversations with other scheme participants. His imprisonment was delayed after his attorney requested that the amount of his initial prospective $150,000 fine be reduced. Wingate had already dropped it to $20,000. It was necessary for McCrory to liquidate assets to be able to pay the million-plus forfeiture sum. Mississippi Attorney General Jim Hood subpoenaed McCrory who provided a deposition in the civil cases Hood brought against corrupt companies and bureaucrats who obtained contracts while Epps' was MDOC Commissioner. This included the largest, Florida's GEO Group. The prosecutors expect a final judgment to include setting a new date for McCrory to report to prison.

On November 1, 2016, while out on bail and still awaiting sentencing, Epps was arrested by the Flowood, Mississippi Police Department. He was charged with breaking into his former primary residence which he had previously turned over to the federal government as part of his plea agreement. He had removed light fixtures and other items. They were recovered at his nearby second home. Appearing in court on November 3, Epps said he had made a "terrible mistake," and only wanted to retrieve some outside floodlights for Halloween. The court was to consider if the possible revocation of his bond was warranted. On November 15, 2016, Epps petitioned the court that he be allowed release to home confinement. Epps remained in jail after his November arrest on burglary charges. On December 23, Judge Wingate denied his request to be released on house arrest, saying he would be held in jail until his May 2017 sentencing.

Although pre-trial federal inmates residing in the central portion of the state of Mississippi are normally held in the Madison County Jail, Epps, for his protection, was instead held in solitary confinement in a correctional facility in Mason, Tennessee; Epps protested his solitary confinement status. He was transferred to the Madison County Jail before, on May 25, 2017, when Judge Wingate gave him a federal prison sentence of 235 months (19.6 years). Wingate, who was appointed to the federal bench in 1985 said, "This is the largest graft operation that certainly I have seen, and I have seen a lot." Wingate cited the Flowood incident as the reason why he gave a sentence that was longer than the one recommended by prosecutors, 13 years. By July 2017 Epps was moved to the Federal Correctional Institution, Seagoville in Texas, near Dallas. His Bureau of Prisons register number is 10095–042. He is due to be released on November 25, 2033.

=== Additional indictments ===
On July 20, 2016, in a seven-count indictment returned by a federal grand jury, Dr. Carl Reddix, an ob/gyn and owner of Heath Assurance LLC, was charged with paying bribes and kickbacks to Epps in return for contract awards with the MDOC and for-profit prison operators. The attorney for Reddix said Epps demanded bribe payments, an assertion also previously made by defendants McCrory, Benjamin and Sam Waggoner. The medical contracts for four for-profit Mississippi prisons held by Wexford Health Sources were sequentially taken from Wexford and subsequently awarded to Reddix. In 2008, his company received a contract to "provide inmate health care services" at the Walnut Grove Correctional Facility; it was renewed in 2011. Transfers of contracts for East Mississippi Correctional Facility and Marshall County Correctional Facility from Wexford to Health Assurance followed in 2012. The fourth and final contract was awarded in 2013 for Wilkinson County Correctional Facility. Judge Wingate recused himself from trying the Reddix case, which was reassigned to Judge Daniel Jordan. In a plea bargain, on May 3, 2017, Reddix, who was accused of paying over $170,000 in bribes, pleaded guilty to a single count of bribery, but his sentencing was postponed until September, with the defense challenging the prosecutors request for payment of $1.27 million in restitution. Reddix was sentenced by Chief Judge Daniel Jordan to six years in prison, plus two years of supervised release. He was fined $15,000 and required to forfeit more than $1.2 million. U.S. Attorney Mike Hurst said that Reddix had personally made 36 bribe payments to Epps over a three-year period. He reported to prison on January 29, 2018, and is being held at the Federal Correctional Institution, Butner 1 Medium custody, in North Carolina.

On January 19, 2017, businessman Sam Waggoner was sentenced to five years in federal prison with two years of supervised release and a $200,000 fine. Waggoner received 5 percent of the revenue as a consultant for Global Tel-Link, which provided phone services at Mississippi state prisons. He told the FBI that before their investigation started, he wrote Epps saying he wanted to end the payments. Epps ripped the letter into "teeny, tiny pieces," flushing it down a toilet, and telling him their arrangement would continue. Waggoner said: "He was basically my boss." Waggoner paid bribes to The bribes were paid from 2012 until at least August 26, 2014. Waggoner is being held at the Federal Medical Center, Fort Worth. His anticipated release date is July 15, 2021.

Epps personally received at least $1.47 million in bribes for steering what Assistant US Attorney LaMarca estimated was $800 million in contracts between 2006 and 2014. Judge Wingate will hear the cases of the others who were charged with bribing Epps.

Irb Benjamin represented Alcorn County as a Democrat in the state House from 1976 to 1980 and the state Senate 1984–92. He later worked for Republican Lieutenant Governor Eddie Briggs, later a gubernatorial nominee. Alcorn County paid Benjamin, president and lobbyist for Mississippi Correctional Management (MCM), $114,000 a year for services to it, although he lived more than 200 miles away. The attorney for the Alcorn County Board of Supervisors said the supervisors were not required to seek bids before giving Benjamin the contract as warden, because it was a contract for services and was thus exempt from bid laws. Benjamin got $5,000 a month to handle accreditation by the American Correctional Association for the Alcorn's Regional Correctional Facility and another $4,500 a month as warden of the jail. He formed MCM in 1996, when the state Department of Corrections and counties started hiring private contractors to operate prisons and smaller regional jails. It operated the Grenada County jail for several years. Benjamin said the company also has jail accreditation contracts worth $4,000 or $5,000 a month with other counties, including Hancock, Holmes, Marion, Pearl River, Washington and Yazoo. In the past, he also worked as a $3,000-a-month jail consultant for DeSoto County. On June 8, 2008, the DeSoto County Board of Supervisors supervisors had approved his contract, noting: “Mr. Benjamin was recommended by Commissioner Epps at the state level.” Benjamin said that he was not aware that Epps had recommended him. Benjamin pleaded guilty to federal charges on October 18, 2016. He faced 10 years in prison, plus a fine of up to a quarter-million dollars. Judge Wingate sentenced him to 70 months in prison, fined him $100,000 and ordered him to forfeit $260,782. Benjamin, who said he was "pressured" by Epps, estimated that he paid the commissioner between $180,000 and $225,000 in cash bribes to secure support for the regional jails. His plea also covered bribes paid for drug and alcohol rehab programs which his company ran under contract to the state. LaMarca told Wingate, "it's just a matter of time" until others whom Benjamin informed upon were indicted. Benjamin is being held at the Federal Correctional Institution, Forrest City, Arkansas, with an anticipated release date of June 13, 2022.

In April 2017, consultant Michael Goddard pleaded guilty to lying to the FBI regarding a bribe he received from Health Assurance in connection with a jail health care contract for Jefferson County, Alabama. Goddard was scheduled to be sentenced August 2, 2017, and faced up to five years in prison and a $250,000 fine. He is being held at the Federal Correctional Institution, Butner Low custody, North Carolina, with a scheduled release date of November 1, 2023. His scheduled release date is November 1, 2023.

On May 24, 2017, LaMarca indicated that more investigations remained open, in Mississippi and Louisiana. An additional indictment had been obtained but remained sealed. At the time of the sentencing of Epps, LaMarca and John Colette, attorney for Epps, said his cooperation could lead to charges against six or seven others, including conspirators from outside Mississippi.

In October 2018, four Louisiana businessmen: Michael LeBlanc Sr. and his son, Michael Jr.; Tawasky L. Ventroy, and Jacque B. Jackson, were indicted and arrested on charges of conspiracy, paying bribes, and attempting to pay bribes to Epps and Kemper County, Mississippi, Sheriff James Moore, who received $2,000 in casino chips from LeBlanc Jr., in Biloxi. LeBlanc Sr. had previously designed five county jails. He bribed Epps to guarantee keeping enough state prisoners in two Mississippi jails located in Alcorn and Chickasaw counties to assure that the two would remain profitable. Irb Benjamin was involved in those corrupt arrangements. In the month before the Epps and McCrory indictments became public in 2014, LeBlanc Sr. called Epps to confirm Ventroy would meet with Epps. Ventroy brought $2,000 in cash to Epps. The four agreed to give something with a value of $5,000 or more with the intent to have Epps help with the awarding and retaining of the contracts for LeBlanc Sr.'s company for inmate commissary services and telephone services with the Kemper County Regional Correctional Facility and elsewhere. Jackson allegedly worked for LeBlanc Jr. to help secure the contracts.

After the initial Epps' indictment, bribes were also made to Moore, who was covertly cooperating with the FBI investigation. U.S. Attorney Michael Hurst of the Southern District of Mississippi thanked Moore for "coming forward and working with us to catch those who violate our corruption laws." On August 18, 2019, all four defendants agreed to plead guilty to certain charges, though the specifics were not released to the public. LeBlanc Sr., was the owner of LCS Correctional Services. He sold five jails to GEO Group for $305 million, with $298 million going to pay debts owed for the construction of those prisons. Although they had not been prosecuted for it, LeBlanc Sr. and his brother Patrick, who died in a plane crash, were involved in bribing a Bexar County, Texas, sheriff and the sheriff's campaign manager, to obtain the contracts for phone and commissary services. After taking their guilty pleas, Judge Wingate set February 10, 2020, for sentencing hearings for all four men.

=== Consequences to Epps ===
Before Judge Wingate pronounced his sentence in July 2017, Epps explained he had considerable time to reflect upon what he'd done, asking forgiveness of the many he had harmed. He said, "It comes back to greed. I made some stupid mistakes I will regret for the rest of my life.” Judge Wingate characterized Epps's conduct as, “staggering." He continued, “Mississippi is still in shock. It was an act of betrayal. He has bruised the image of Mississippi and given joy to many of the inmates he’s overseen who can now say the head of the state prison system was just as corrupt as any of them.” He sentenced Epps to 19 years in federal prison. The state burglary charges concerning his former home were resolved on February 20, 2018, when Epps pleaded guilty and was sentenced to seven years, the state sentence to run concurrently with his federal prison sentence. Epps forfeited both his investment and bank accounts, his $310,000 Flowood residence, plus a $237,601 condo on the Gulf Coast and two Mercedes-Benz cars to resolve a $1,300,000 judgment against him. In May 2019, Epps and his wife lost an appeal for non-payment of $69,489 in state taxes for the years 2007 through 2014, assessed on the proceeds of the bribery schemes.

=== State civil suits ===
On February 8, 2017, Mississippi Attorney General Jim Hood announced he had filed civil cases against 15 corporations and individuals who had engaged in contracts with the MDOC and Epps, seeking damages and punitive damages. He stated,

“The state of Mississippi has been defrauded through a pattern of bribery, kickbacks, misrepresentations, fraud, concealment, money laundering and other wrongful conduct.” He continued, “These individuals and corporations that benefited by stealing from taxpayers must not only pay the state's losses, but state law requires that they must also forfeit and return the entire amount of the contracts paid by the state. We are also seeking punitive damages to punish these conspirators and to deter those who might consider giving or receiving kickbacks in the future."

Besides Teresa Malone and Carl Reddix, the defendants included Michael Reddix (who had not been charged by the US Attorney); Andrew Jenkins; Management & Training Corporation; The GEO Group, Inc.; Cornell Companies, Inc.; Wexford Health Sources, Inc.; The Bantry Group Corporation; AdminPros, L.L.C.; CGL Facility Management, LLC; Mississippi Correctional Management, Inc.; Drug Testing Corporation; Global Tel*Link Corporation; Health Assurance, LLC; Keefe Commissary Network, LLC of St. Louis; Sentinel Offender Services, L.L.C.; AJA Management & Technical Services, Inc., and the Branan Medical Corporation.

On May 18, 2017, Hood announced that the state had quickly settled the first suit for two million dollars. The defendant was Alere Incorporated, which had purchased the Branan Medical Corporation. Ten lawsuits in bribery schemes remained pending. Those have accused at least 10 individuals and 11 out-of-state corporations of using so-called “consultants” to gain more than $800 million in Mississippi prison contracts. On January 24, 2019, Hood announced his actions had recovered $27 million from those vendors against which he had filed suits. Management and Training Corporation paid $5.2 million. GEO Group paid $4.6 million, with the named defendant being Cornell Companies, which had been merged with GEO in 2010. Wexford Health Sources paid $4 million. Keefe Commissary Network paid $3.1 million. $3.1 million was paid by C.N.W. Construction Company. $750,000 was paid by CGL Facility Management, which provides maintenance services. $32,188 was received from AdminPros LLC, a Medicaid billing service. Insurance agent Guy E. “Butch” Evans paid $100,000. Health Assurance LLC, went bankrupt so did not pay the state.

On May 19, 2020, the Mississippi appeals court ruled against Epps and his wife Catherjean who had litigated against paying their tax liabilities for the years 2007–2014, that had been assessed on those ill-gotten gains emanating from the later discovery of the bribery schemes.
