= Billy Nicholson (politician) =

American politician

Member of the Mississippi House of Representatives for the 78th district
- In office January 4, 2000 – January 3, 2012
- Succeeded by: Randy Rushing

Personal details
- Born: February 5, 1948 (age 78) Union, Mississippi, US
- Party: Democrat (2000-2009) Republican (2009-2012)
- Children: 2
- Education: East Central Community College; Mississippi State University

Billy Nicholson (born February 5, 1948) is an American politician and former insurance agent from Mississippi. He served as a member of the Mississippi House of Representatives 2000 to 2012 for the 78th district. In February 2009, he changed his party affiliation from the Democratic to the Republican Party.

== Early life and education ==
Nicholson was born in Union, Mississippi on February 5, 1948. He attended East Central Community College and graduated from Mississippi State University.

== Career ==
From 2000 to 2012, Nicholson represented the 78th District, which includes portions of Neshoba, Newton, and Scott counties. In 2003, he was the secretary for the Mississippi Legislative Conservative Coalition.

He switched parties in February 2009 based on several factors: philosophical reasons; the Democratic Party threatening to deny his certification in future elections after his endorsement of a national Republican candidate; and his disapproval of President Obama's stimulus bill. He explained that he had wanted to delay the switch until he retired from his career as a State Farm Insurance agent.

== Personal life ==
Nicholson is married to the former Betty Gail Williams and has two children. He is of Baptist faith.
