= Art Gardner =

American baseball player (born 1952)

- Outfielder
- Born: September 21, 1952; Madden, Mississippi
- Batted: Left Threw: Left

MLB debut
- September 2, 1975, for the Houston Astros

Last MLB appearance
- September 17, 1978, for the San Francisco Giants

MLB statistics
- Batting average: .162
- Home runs: 0
- Run batted in: 5
- Stats at Baseball Reference

Teams
- Houston Astros (1975, 1977); San Francisco Giants (1978)

Arthur Junior Gardner (born September 21, 1952) is a former outfielder in Major League Baseball who played for the Houston Astros and San Francisco Giants in part of three seasons spanning 1975–1978. Gardner was the Astros' opening day center fielder in 1977.

== Baseball career ==
Gardner was selected out of South Leake High School in Walnut Grove, Mississippi in the 2nd round (36th overall) of the 1971 June amateur Baseball draft by the Houston Astros.
