= Bennett Malone =

American politician

Member of the Mississippi House of Representatives from the 45th district
- In office 1979–2015
- Succeeded by: Jay Mathis

Personal details
- Born: January 6, 1944 Carthage, Mississippi
- Died: December 17, 2017 (aged 73) Jackson, Mississippi
- Party: Democratic
- Spouse: Teresa Dolan
- Children: Ricky, Gina, Krystol, Brittany
- Occupation: Businessman, cattle rancher

Bennett Malone (January 6, 1944 – December 17, 2017) was an American politician in the state of Mississippi. He was a Democrat.

Malone was a native of Carthage, Mississippi, and attended East Central Junior College. He was elected to the Mississippi House of Representatives in 1978, and served the 45th district from 1979 to 2015. He served on the Corrections, Forestry, Transportation, Ways and Means, and Wildlife, Fisheries and Parks committees. A businessman and cattle rancher, he was a Democrat. He was married to Teresa Dolan Malone. He died on December 17, 2017, from a long illness.

On July 25, 2016, his wife was indicted for giving bribes to Mississippi Department of Corrections Commissioner Christopher Epps through former legislator, Cecil McCrory, from 2010 until 2014, on behalf of medical services provider AdminPros LLC. She initially pleaded not guilty.

On October 6, 2017, she changed her plea to guilty to paying kickbacks to Epps in exchange for receiving an MDOC consulting agreement. She admitted to getting $225,000.00 from the agreement with an out-of-state contractor arranged by Epps, receiving $5,000.00 monthly between October, 2010, through July, 2014, from which she paid Epps between $1,000.00 to $1,750.00 month. Malone was to be sentenced on January 10, 2018, by federal Judge Henry Travillion Wingate and faced a maximum penalty of 10 years in prison and a $250,000.00 fine. However she was admitted to a Birmingham, Alabama, hospital due to complications from a lung transplant, and Judge Wingate indefinitely delayed her sentencing. Malone was sentenced on May 24, 2019. She is being held at the FMC Carswell, in Fort Worth, Texas, with a scheduled release date of July 24, 2022.
