= Jay Mathis =

American politician

Member of the Mississippi House of Representatives from the 45th district
- In office May 6, 2015 – January 5, 2016
- Preceded by: Bennett Malone
- Succeeded by: Michael Evans

Personal details
- Born: April 24, 1970 (age 56) Waco, Texas, U.S.
- Party: Republican
- Spouse: Andrea
- Education: University of Mississippi (BA)

Jay W. Mathis (born April 24, 1970) is an American politician. He was a member of the Mississippi House of Representatives from the 45th district. A Republican, he ran unopposed in a special election in May 2015 to replace Bennett Malone. Mathis unsuccessfully challenged Malone in 2007 and 2011 and chose not to run for reelection in the November 2015 elections due to redistricting.
