= Winson Hudson =

Winson Hudson, born Anger Winson Gates (November 17, 1916, in Galilee, Mississippi – May 1, 2004) was an American civil rights activist.

== Early life and marriage ==
Anger Winson Gates, named after her paternal grandmother, Angeline Gates Turner, was born on November 17, 1916, in Galilee, Mississippi. She was the tenth child of thirteen children born to John Wesely Gates and Emma Laura Kirkland Turner. Her grandmother, Angeline Gates Turner, grew up as a slave and had a great impact on Winson's life. Her grandmother was taken advantage of by white men of the Moore family, the family who brought her as a slave to Leake County. Winson's paternal grandfather was a white lawyer named Dave Moore. Winson's mother died, at age 44, during childbirth, due to lack of medical attention when Winson was eight years old. Winson's father raised her and her siblings on his own. Their family had a 105-acre farm in which provided them with food and resources until it was sold to another black family by a white doctor. Growing up, Winson was involved in the church. Her mother (before her death) and her father were both involved in the ministry.

Winson quit school in eleventh grade when she married Leroy Cleo Hudson (died 1971)at the age of eighteen in 1936. Cleo Hudson's grandfather, Joe Dotson, owned four or five hundred acres of land in Harmony. Times were hard and they moved to Chicago briefly to find jobs. After moving back to Mississippi, Winson obtained her teaching certification and taught school in Leake County, Mississippi, from 1949 to 1951. She taught first, second and third grade classes at Bay Spring Grammar School. Later she became Lunchroom Manager at Harmony School, where she served food.

== Activism ==
=== NAACP ===
With help from Medgar Evers an NAACP charter was formed in Leake County in 1961: Clara Dotson was president and Winson Hudson was vice president. Some members of the Leake County community were skeptical about getting involved with the NAACP because they knew that it could lead to unwanted trouble with white Klan members. In 1961, with assistance from the NAACP Legal Defense Fund and Derrick Bell, the Hudson sisters started a lawsuit to desegregate Leake County schools. The case received national attention and a lot of people in the black community were afraid. Times were hard during the lawsuit and Evers was a lot of help. Medgar was assassinated in 1963 by white supremacist, Byron De La Beckwith on June 11.

The lawsuit was decided in the fall of 1964 with the judge ordering the Leake County schools be desegregated one grade at time starting with first grade. Dovie Hudson's daughter, Diane Hudson, named as plaintiff in the lawsuit, was in high school and not eligible to desegregate. Debra Lewis, daughter of A. J. and Minnie Lewis allowed their daughter, Debra Lewis (died February 4, 2001, aged forty-three) to be the first black to enroll in a Leake County public school. Debra's family suffered from her enrollment in a white school. Her father lost his job and was beaten up and someone tried to burn down their home. Debra went on to graduate from Leake County High School. Teachers were fired for being associated with the NAACP. Hudson continued to be involved in lawsuits against Mississippi authorities in her fight to keep black schools open. As a result of her involvement with the Civil Rights Movement, she and her family were often the target of white violence. Dovie, Winson's sister, house was bombed twice in three months in 1967 and there was an attempt to bomb Winson's house in November of the same year.

In 1964, Winson and other activist had students from Freedom Summer come to Harmony. With lots of help and donations, they built Harmony Community Center where the students could educate the black youth of the community. Winsons's husband Cleo also played a big role in the building of the community center. White community members expressed animosity towards the Freedom Summer students and those people trying to help them. Three students were murdered. In 1967, along with Mississippi State NAACP President Aaron Henry, Charles Evers and other NAACP members integrated the Holiday Inn in Clarksdale, Mississippi.

=== Black voter registration ===
In February 1965 Winson appeared before the U.S. Commission on Civil Rights to speak about harassment of blacks attempting to register to vote. Winson started paying poll taxes in 1937 until it was no longer required after the passing of the Voting Rights Act of 1965, signed by President Lyndon B. Johnson. During that time, she only voted for the trustee of Harmony School. When she first tried to register to vote in the National Elections, she was denied several times. Winson began trying to obtain a voter registration card in 1937 and it was not until 1962 when she and her sister, Dovie Hudson, passed a required literacy test and were granted voting privileges. U.S Justice Department sent Frank Schwelb to Carthage to investigate Leake County's voter registration procedures which also allow the sister to register to vote. This was after they had been harassed. After passing the literacy test, with the help of the NAACP, they got grants from the Voter Education Project in Atlanta and started a voter registration project. They pulled in about 1,000 black voters. After the passing of the Voting Rights Act of 1965, she and other activist worked to get people in Leake County not only to register to vote, but to actually get out and vote.

=== Head Start ===
Winson served in a variety of roles when Leake County's first Head Start Program which was established in Harmony in 1965. Winson attended a training program in Mt. Beulah, Mississippi to learn how to organize a head start program and upon her return to Leake County, she and other activist started a committee to help start the program. Once again, it was hard to get participants because many were afraid to get involved. After losing funding within six months of opening, the center was run by volunteers. In 1966, more funding was provided for the Head Start program and Winson helped to organize the Pilgrim Rest Center, Rising Chapel Center, Early Center, and Ofahoma Center.

== Later in life ==
Winson continued to promote efforts to desegregate public facilities in Carthage, Mississippi. In 1971, Winson attended the American Hospital Association's conference on health care delivery and spoke out about the lack of sufficient health care for the poor.

=== Recognition ===
Winson achieved substantial national recognition in her later life. She was a delegate to the 1976 Democratic National Convention in Florida. In October 1978 Winson was selected as one of three black leaders from southern states to have lunch with President Jimmy Carter. In April 1983 Hudson was presented with the Distinguished Service Award for Outstanding Community Service from Mississippi Governor William Winter. In 1989 The Mississippi Democratic party presented her with a Fannie Lou Hamer Award. Winson and her sister, Dovie were featured in I Dream A World: Portraits of Black Women Who Changed America, a photo essay book by Brian Lanker. Winson attended a gallery exhibition of the project in Washington, D.C., in 1989 at the Corcoran Gallery. At the Gallery, Winson saw Oprah Winfrey, and Alice Walker. In 1994 Winson testified on behalf of Mississippi's poor citizens before President Bill Clinton's Health Reform Task Force Committee in Washington, D.C.

=== Autobiography ===
Hudson published her autobiography in 2002 as Mississippi Harmony: Memoirs of a Freedom Fighter (Palgrave Macmillan, 2002). It gives Winson Hudson's story in her own words, supplemented with historical information at the start of each chapter by Constance W. Curry; it includes a foreword by Derrick Bell. (Alice Walker's In Search of Our Mothers' Gardens speaks of helping Winson edit "The Autobiography of Mrs. Winson Hudson, a Black Woman of Mississippi".) Winson recalls the struggle of her early days as an activist: "It was a lonely walk", due to open hostility from the white community, as well as opposition from black citizens.

Annie Maude, Winson's daughter, had two sons, Donovan and Kempton Horton. Winson had a great-grandson, Ryan and two great-granddaughters, Tyler and Lauren from her sons and their wives, Dionne and Lisa.
