= Leake Central High School =

Coordinates: 32°44′37″N 89°31′37″W

- 704 N Jordan St, Carthage, MS 39051; United States

Information
- Type: Public
- School district: Leake County School District
- Superintendent: Patrick Posey
- Principal: Jeremy Stewart
- Teaching staff: 38.64 (FTE)
- Grades: 9–12
- Enrollment: 602 (2023–2024)
- Student to teacher ratio: 15.58
- Colors: Orange, White, & Black
- Mascot: Gator
- Website: central-hs.leakesd.org

Leake Central High School is a public school located at 704 Jordan Street in Carthage, Mississippi, United States. It is part of the Leake County School District. The school is currently rated Category 4.

== History ==
Leake Central High School serves students enrolled in grades 9-12 and was built in 1961. W.C. Oliver was the Superintendent. Hicks and McMullan of Jackson designed the school. Webster Construction Company of Meridian built CHS.

Carthage High School along with Edinburg Attendance Center and Thomastown Attendance Center were consolidated for the 2011–2012 school year following a court order from the Department of Justice. The school was renamed Leake Central High School. The gator mascot and school colors (orange, black, and white) were selected by the students.

In 2026, Leake County High School's high school component will consolidate into Leake Central High School, while its middle school students will be assigned to middle schools.
