= Leake County High School =

School in Mississippi

Coordinates: 32.5966°N 89.4567°W

Leake County High School, formerly South Leake High School, is a 7–12 school in Walnut Grove, Mississippi. It is a part of the Leake County School District.

In 2026, Leake County High School's high school component will consolidate into Leake Central High School, while its middle school students will be assigned to middle schools. Several relatives of students and former students had expressed opposition to the plan to disestablish Leake County High. There was a petition that expressed opposition that was signed by about 400 individuals.
