= East Central Community College =

Junior college in Decatur, Mississippi, U.S.

Coordinates: 32.4406°N 89.1128°W

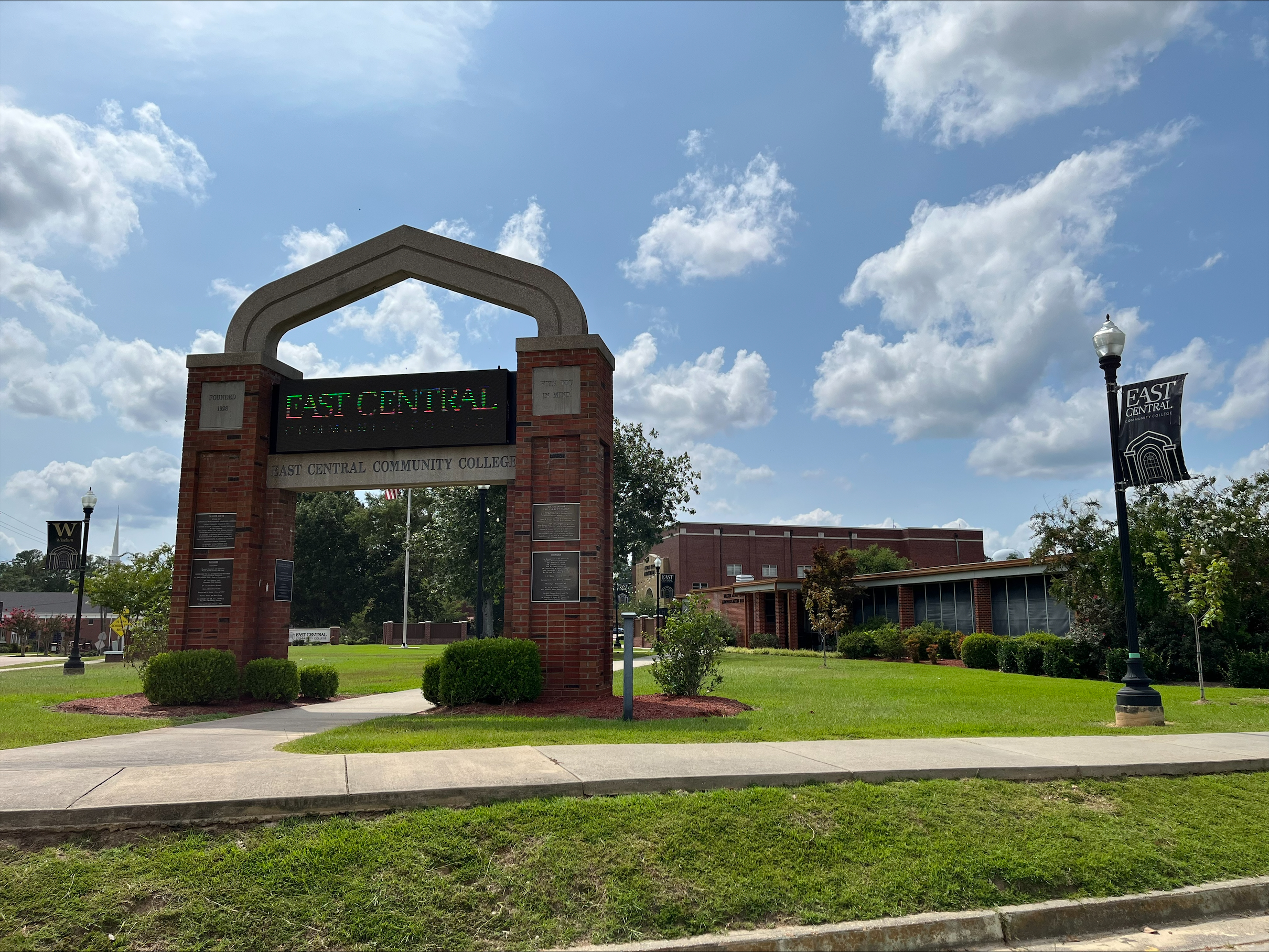
- Type: Public community college
- Established: 1928
- Parent institution: Mississippi Association of Community & Junior Colleges
- President: Brent Gregory
- Location: Decatur, Mississippi, U.S.
- Colors: Black, gold
- Nickname: Warriors
- Sporting affiliations: NJCAA
- Website: www.eccc.edu

East Central Community College (ECCC) is a public community college in Decatur, Mississippi, United States. ECCC serves a five-county district: Leake, Neshoba, Newton, Scott, and Winston counties. It opened in September 1928.

== Campus ==
The college includes dormitories, with women in Emma Lee Barber Hall, Mrs. J. L. Jackson Hall, and the Women's Residence Hall, and men in Neshoba, Stella W. Newsome, Scott, and L. O. Todd halls. Winston Hall also houses students. Leake Hall has married students, students in honors level programs, faculty, and staff. The college has twelve single family houses for faculty housing.

== Band ==
The college's band is nicknamed is "the Wall O' Sound". It performs at all ECCC home football games, playoff games, and bowl games and select away games with a pep band traveling to all away games. The band also performs in events and parades in the surrounding area including the MHSAA Region III Marching Band Evaluations, the Newton Christmas Parade, the Union Christmas Parade, the Carthage Christmas Parade, the Forest Christmas Parade, the Decatur Christmas Parade, and the Philadelphia MLK Parade. Instrumental scholarships for the Wall O' Sound cover full tuition at East Central Community College.

== Athletics ==
The "Warriors" is the name of the ECCC athletic teams and their colors are black and gold. They are a member of the NJCAA Region 23 and of the MACJC. ECCC sponsors 9 sports (5 men and 4 women) including football, softball, baseball, men's and women's basketball, men's and women's soccer, and men's and women's tennis.

== Notable alumni ==
- Phyliss J. Anderson, Tribal Chief of the Mississippi Band of Choctaw Indians
- Tim Anderson, professional baseball player
- Kendrick Clancy, professional football player
- Billy Dean, musician and songwriter
- Antonio Gibson, professional football player
- Randy Houser, country music singer and writer
- Billy Nicholson, politician
- Bennett Malone, politician
- D. Michael Hurst Jr., lawyer
- Trent Kelly, politician
