= 2004–2008 Mississippi Legislature =

←	2000–2004 Mississippi Legislature	2008–2012 Mississippi Legislature	→
- State Seal

Overview
- Legislative body: Mississippi Legislature
- Jurisdiction: Mississippi, United States
- Meeting place: Mississippi State Capitol
- Term: 6 January 2004 – 18 May 2007
- Election: 2003 Mississippi elections

Mississippi State Senate
- Members: 52
- President: Amy Tuck
- President pro tempore: Travis Little
- Party control: Democratic

Mississippi House of Representatives
- Members: 122
- Speaker: William J. McCoy
- Speaker pro tempore: J. P. Compretta
- Party control: Democratic

The 2004–2008 Mississippi Legislature met in Jackson, Mississippi, for 13 sessions between January 6, 2004, and May 18, 2007. The election for the 2004–2008 Mississippi Legislature was held in November 2003, with the election winners meeting in January 2004, to begin their four year terms of office.

== Party breakdown ==
=== Senate ===
Affiliation	Members
Democratic Party	27
Republican Party	25
Other party^{*}	0
Seat Vacant^{**}	0
Total	52

=== House of Representatives ===
Affiliation	Members
Democratic Party	75
Republican Party	47
Other party^{*}	0
Seat Vacant^{**}	0
Total	122

== Officers ==
=== Senate ===
==== Presiding Officer ====
Position	Name	Party	District
President	Amy Tuck	Republican Party	n/a
President Pro Tempore	Travis Little	Democratic Party	4

=== House of Representatives ===
==== Presiding Officer ====
Position	Name	Party	District
Speaker of the House	William J. McCoy	Democratic Party	3
Speaker Pro Tempore	Joseph Patrick Compretta	Democratic Party	122

== Members of the Mississippi State Senate, 2004-2008 ==
District	Name	Party
1	Doug E. Davis	R
2	Bill Stone	D
3	Nickey Browning	D
4	Travis Little	D
5	J. P. Wilemon	D
6	Alan Nunnelee	R
7	Hob Bryan	D
8	Carl Jackson Gordon, Jr.	D
9	Gray Tollison	D
10	H. Nolan Mettetal	R
11	Robert L. Jackson	D
12	Johnnie E. Walls, Jr.	D
13	Willie Lee Simmons	D
14	Lydia Chassaniol	R
15	Gary Jackson	R
16	Bennie L. Turner	D
17	Terry W. Brown	R
18	Giles Ward	R
19	Merle Flowers	R
20	Lee Yancey	R
21	Kenneth W. Jones	D
22	Eugene S. Clarke	R
23	W. Briggs Hopson, III	R
24	David Lee Jordan	D
25	J. Walter Michel	R
26	John A. Horhn	D
27	Hillman Terome Frazier	D
28	Alice Varnado Harden	D
29	David Blount	D
30	Dean Kirby	R
31	Terry Clark Burton	R
32	Sampson Jackson II	D
33	Fredie Videt Carmichael	R
34	Haskins Montgomery	D
35	Perry Lee	R
36	E. Vincent Davis	D
37	Bob M. Dearing	D
38	Kelvin Butler	D
39	Cindy Hyde-Smith	D
40	Sidney Albritton	R
41	Joey Fillingane	R
42	Chris McDaniel	R
43	Tommy "Two-Dog" Dickerson	D
44	Thomas E. King Jr.	R
45	Billy Hudson	R
46	David Baria	D
47	Ezell Lee	D
48	Deborah Dawkins	D
49	William Gardner Hewes III	R
50	Thomas Arlin Gollot	R
51	Michael Watson Jr.	R
52	Tommy O. Moffatt	R

== Members of the Mississippi State House of Representatives, 2004-2008 ==
District	Name	Party	Entered office	Residence
1	Ricky Cummings	D	1996	Iuka
2	Harvey Moss	D	1984	Corinth
3	William J. McCoy	D	1980	Rienzi
4	Greg Ward Jr.	D	2000	Ripley
5	Kelvin O. Buck	D	2000	Holly Springs
6	E. Forrest Hamilton	R	2004	Olive Branch
7	Wanda Taylor Jennings	R	1998	Southaven
8	Larry Baker	R	2000	Senatobia
9	Clara Henderson Burnett	D	2004	Tunica
10	Warner F. McBride	D	1992	Courtland
11	Joe Gardner	D	2007	Batesville
12	Noal Akins	R	2004	Oxford
13	Jack Gadd	D	1992	Hickory Flat
14	Margaret Ellis Rogers	D	2004	New Albany
15	Pat Montgomery	D	2000	Pontotoc
16	Steve Holland	D	1984	Plantersville
17	Brian Aldridge	R	2004	Tupelo
18	Jerry R. Turner	R	2004	Baldwin
19	James R. "Jamie" Franks, Jr.	D	1996	Mooreville
20	J. B. Markham	D	1997	Greenwood Springs
21	Bill Miles	D	1996	Fulton
22	Preston E. Sullivan	D	2004	Okolona
23	Jim Beckett	R	2004	Bruce
24	Sid Bondurant	D	2004	Grenada
25	John Mayo	D	2000	Clarksdale
26	Chuck Espy	D	2000	Clarksdale
27	Ferr Smith	D	1993	Carthage
28	David Norquist	D	2005	Cleveland
29	Linda F. Coleman	D	1992	Mound Bayou
30	Robert E. Huddleston	D	1996	Sumner
31	Sara Richardson Thomas	D	1998	Indianola
32	Willie J. Perkins, Sr.	D	1993	Greenwood
33	Tommy Reynolds	D	1980	Charleston
34	Linda Whittington	D	2007	Schlater
35	Dannie Reed	R	2004	Ackerman
36	David Gibbs	D	1993	West Point
37	Gary A. Chism	R	2004	Columbus
38	Tyrone Ellis	D	1980	Starkville
39	Jeffery C. Smith	D	1992	Columbus
40	Ted Mayhall	R	2004	Southaven
41	Esther M. Harrison	D	2000	Columbus
42	Reecy L. Dickson	D	1993	Macon
43	Gale Gregory	R	2004	Louisville
44	C. Scott Bounds	D	2004	Philadelphia
45	Bennett Malone	D	1980	Carthage
46	Bobby B. Howell	R	1992	Kilmichael
47	Bryant W. Clark	D	2004	Pickens
48	Mary Ann Stevens	D	1981	West
49	Willie L. Bailey	D	1995	Greenville
50	John W. Hines	D	2001	Greenville
51	Rufus E. Straughter	D	1996	Belzoni
52	Tommy Woods	R	1988	Byhalia
53	Bobby Moak	D	1984	Bogue Chitto
54	Dr. Chester Masterson	R	2000	Vicksburg
55	George Flaggs, Jr.	D	1988	Vicksburg
56	Philip Gunn	R	2004	Clinton
57	Edward Blackmon, Jr.	D	(1979–1980), 1984	Canton
58	Rita Martinson	R	1992	Madison
59	Clayton Smith	R	1998	Brandon
60	John L. Moore	R	1996	Brandon
61	Ray Rogers	R	1984	Pearl
62	Tom Weathersby	R	1992	Florence
63	Walter L. Robinson	D	1984	Bolton
64	William C. Denny, Jr.	R	1988	Jackson
65	Mary H. Coleman	D	1994	Jackson
66	Cecil Brown	D	2000	Jackson
67	Earle S. Banks	D	1993	Jackson
68	Credell Calhoun	D	1980–1992; 2004–2020	Jackson
69	Alyce Griffin Clarke	D	1985	Jackson
70	James "Jim" Evans	D	1992	Jackson
71	John Reeves	R	1984	Jackson
72	Erik Fleming	D	1999	Jackson
73	Jim Ellington	R	1988	Raymond
74	Mark Baker	R	2004	Brandon
75	Tracy Arinder	D	2004	Morton
76	Greg Holloway, Sr.	D	2000	Hazlehurst
77	Clint Rotenberry	R	1992	Mendenhall
78	Billy R. Nicholson	D	2000	Little Rock
79	Blaine "Bo" Eaton	D	1996	Taylorsville
80	Omeria Scott	D	1993	Laurel
81	Steve Horne	R	2004	Meridian
82	Charles Young	D	1980	Meridian
83	Greg Snowden	R	2000	Meridian
84	Eric Robinson	R	1993	Mississippi
85	America "Chuck" Middleton	D	1996	Mississippi
86	Sherra Hillman Lane	D	2005	Waynesboro
87	Johnny W. Stringer	D	1980	Montrose
88	Gary V. Staples	R	1988–1992; 2004–present	Laurel
89	Bobby Shows	D	1992	Ellisville
90	J. L. Warren	D	1980	Mount Olive
91	Joey Hudson	D	1996	Monticello
92	Jim C. Barnett, M.D.	R	1992	Brookhaven
93	Dirk Dedeaux	D	1996	Perkinston
94	Robert L. Johnson, III	D	2004	Natchez
95	Jessica Sibley Upshaw	R	2004	Diamondhead
96	Angela Cockerham	D	2005	Magnolia
97	Sam C. Mims, V	R	2004	McComb
98	David W. Myers	D	1996	McComb
99	Robert E. Vince	D	1980–2000, 2004	Sandy Hook
100	Ken Morgan	R	2007	Morgantown
101	Harvey Fillingane	R	2007	Hattiesburg
102	Lee Jarrell Davis	R	1992	Hattiesburg
103	Percy W. Watson	D	1980	Hattiesburg
104	Mike Lott	R	2000	Petal
105	J. Shaun Walley	D	2005	Leakesville
106	Herb Frierson	R	1992	Poplarville
107	Deryk Parker	D	2004	Lucedale
108	Mark Formby	R	1993	Picayune
109	Frank Hamilton	R	1992	Hurley
110	Billy Broomfield	D	1992	Moss Point
111	Carmel Wells-Smith	R	1993	Pascagoula
112	John O. Read	R	1993	Gaultier
113	H.B. "Hank" Zuber, III	R	2000	Ocean Springs
114	Danny Guice, Jr.	R	1984	Ocean Springs
115	Randall H. Patterson	D	2004	Biloxi
116	Steven Palazzo	R	2007	Biloxi
117	Michael W. Janus	R	1996	Biloxi
118	Roger Ishee	R	1998	Gulfport
119	Frances Fredericks	D	1990	Gulfport
120	James C. Simpson, Jr.	R	1995	Gulfport
121	Diane C. Peranich	D	1988	Pass Christian
122	J. P. Compretta	D	(1976–1984), 1988	Bay St. Louis
