= Tobias Thomas =

German economist

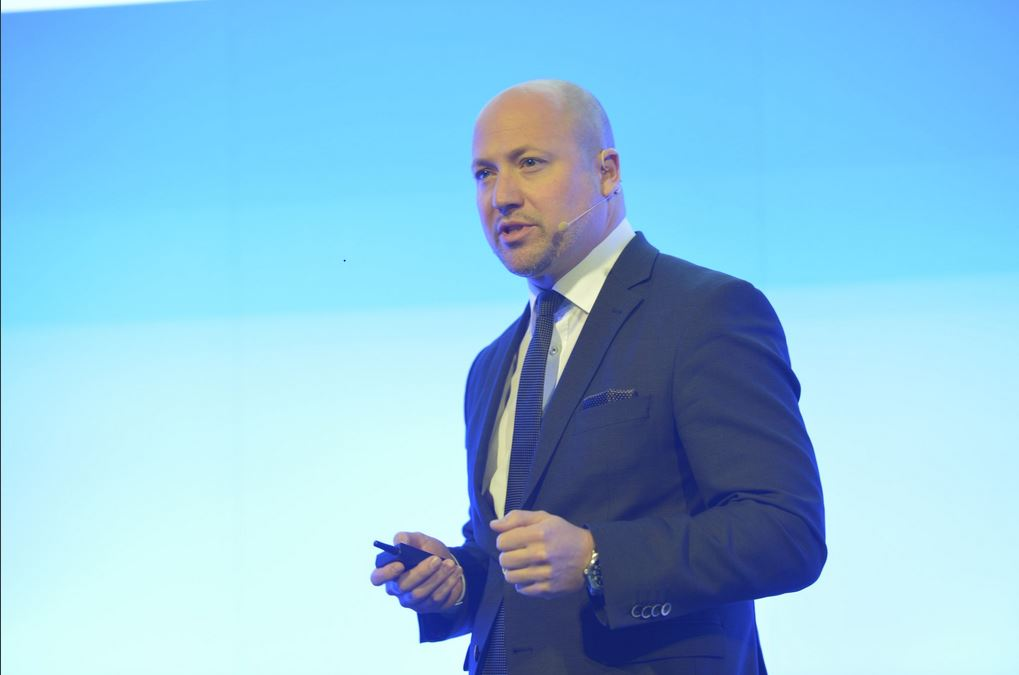
Tobias Thomas (Economist)

Tobias Thomas (born April 1975 in Duisburg) is a German economist with a focus on economic policy, competitiveness, and structural reforms. He is Professor of Economics at the Graz Schumpeter Centre at the University of Graz and Vice Chair of the Austrian Productivity Board, Austria's Council of Economic Advisors on productivity and competitiveness, and Member of the Austrian Competition Commission. From 2020 to 2025 he served as Director General of the Austrian Federal Statistical Office (Statistics Austria).

== Academic and professional career ==
Thomas studied economics at the Friedrich Wilhelm University of Bonn and Technische Universität Berlin before earning his doctorate summa cum laude at Helmut-Schmidt-University Hamburg, where he later also gained his habilitation. Thomas was a visiting scholar at, among others, Columbia University at the invitation of Nobel Laureate in Economics Joseph E. Stiglitz and Anya Schiffrin and at the Max-Planck Institute for Tax Law and Public Finance in Munich at the invitation of Kai A. Konrad.

After working as Director of Economic Policy and Director European Economic Policy at the German Chamber of Industry and Commerce (DIHK) in Berlin and Brussels (2008-2013), Thomas was Research Director of an international company for media analysis and strategic communication consultancy based in Zurich with regional offices in Hanoi, New York and Pretoria from 2013-2016. From 2017 to June 2020, Thomas was director of the economic research institute EcoAustria, which focuses in particular on the ex-ante and ex-post evaluation of economic and social policy measures on the basis of simulation models and econometric analyses. During his term, the institute expanded its contract research for federal ministries, state government offices and the European Commission.

From 2020 to 2025, Thomas served as Director General of the Austrian Federal Statistical Office (Statistics Austria), employing around 850 staff and with a budget of EUR 100 million (2025). During his term of office, the research data infrastructure Austrian Micro Data Centre (AMDC) was established and the Austrian SocioEconomic Panel (ASEP) was introduced. In the 2022 Peer Review of the European Statistical System (ESS) the number of recommendations was almost halved compared to 2014. In addition, the Economic and Social Council of the United Nations (ECOSOC) decided in 2025 that Austria would become a full member of the world's highest statistical body, the United Nations Statistical Commission (UNSC) in New York, from 2026 for the first time since 1983.

In academia, Thomas was first a lecturer and then a professor of economics at Heinrich Heine University Düsseldorf from 2012-2014. Since 2024 he has been a university professor of economics at the Graz Schumpeter Centre (GSC) at the University of Graz.

== Committees and functions ==
Thomas has been involved in various academic and advisory bodies. He is Vice Chair of the Austrian Productivity Board, Austria's Council of Economic Advisors on competitiveness and productivity, and Member of the Austrian Competition Commission, which advises the Federal Ministry for Economy, Energy and Tourism (BMWET) and the Federal Competition Authority (BWB) and prepares opinions on merger proceedings. Furthermore, he is a member of the Committee on Economic Policy and the Committee on Economic Systems and Institutional Economics of the German Economic Association (Verein für Socialpolitik). In addition, Thomas is Research Affiliate at the Austrian Institute of Economic Research (WIFO) and at the Düsseldorf Institute for Competition Economics (DICE) of Heinrich Heine University Düsseldorf.

Thomas served as Vice President of the Austrian Statistical Society (ÖSG, 2020-2024), scientific expert at the Austrian Pension Commission (2019-2023), which analyses the financial sustainability of the national pension system, and member of the Commission Future of Statistics (KomZS, 2022-2025) for the strategic planning of the German Federal Statistical Office (Destatis). In addition, Thomas was a member of the Science Advisory Board of the Complexity Science Hub Vienna (2021-2025) and a Research Fellow at the Center for Media, Data and Society (CMDS, 2018-2022) at the Central European University (CEU).

== International organizations ==
In his capacity as Director General of the Austrian Federal Statistical Office (Statistics Austria), Thomas represented Austria internationally in the European Statistical System Committee (ESSC) in Luxembourg, the United Nations Statistical Commission (UNSC) in New York, the United Nations Conference of European Statisticians (UNCES) in Geneva, and the OECD Committee on Statistics and Statistical Policy (CSSP)in Paris (all 2020-2025). 2021-2023, he was also elected by the ESS member states to the Partnership Group (ESS-PG), which provides strategic advice to the work of the ESSC. In addition, Thomas was member of the UNCES Task Force on Data Stewardship (2021-2023) and UNCES Task Force on Changing Role of National Statistical Offices in Data Ecosystems (2024-2025).

== Scientific work ==
Thomas’s research focuses on economic policy, public finance, competitiveness, the political economy of reforms, and the interaction between media, perception, and behaviour. His work also addresses the role of institutions in shaping economic performance, as well as public policy debate on productivity and competitiveness at the national and European level, including proposals for a European Productivity Board.

His research results on the impact of media coverage on the government bond yield spreads during the European debt crisis, his research on the impact of media coverage on voting intentions, as well as his research on the political positioning of the US Newscasts ABC, CBS, NBC, and FOX were published in the European Journal of Political Economy (EJPE); the analysis of the impact of media coverage on the population's concerns about migration in the Journal of Economic Behavior & Organization (JEBO); his research on the role of the media in democracies in the Constitutional Political Economy (CPE). Other research on improving economic forecasts has been published in the Journal of Forecasting, on policymakers' risk-taking in the context of reform in the Review of Economics, on the economic consequences of reform reluctance in Perspektiven der Wirtschaftspolitik, and on climate policy measures and energy forecasts for Germany, Austria, and Switzerland in Zeitschrift für Energiewirtschaft.

In addition, Thomas focusses in his applied research on the sustainability of public finances and social security systems, the competitiveness of economies, as well as on the eurozone and the ECB, which he has published in numerous applied journal articles. Other areas of focus include data science, data governance of complex data ecosystems (see e.g. here), as well as building and improving research data infrastructure facilities.

== Honors and media presence (selection) ==
According to the 2019 ranking of economists by Die Presse, F.A.Z., and the Neue Zürcher Zeitung, Thomas is the 5th most influential economist in Austria (2018: rank 6). Since 2020, he has no longer been listed in accordance with the ranking's regulations due to his position as Director General of Statistics Austria. Thomas is regularly present in national and international media, for example in BusinessDay, Der Standard, Die Presse, Frankfurter Allgemeine Zeitung, Schweizer Monat, Trend and Wirtschaftswoche. In 2024, Thomas was quoted 1,699 times in Austrian media only (2023: 1,788; 2022: 1,601; 2021: 1,413 times).

== Scientific publications (selection) ==
- Thomas, T. & Reinstaller, A. (2026), Recharging Europe’s Competitiveness: The Case for a European Productivity Board, in: European View, available online March 30, 2026.
- Hirsch, P., Feld, L. P., Köhler, E. A., &Thomas, T. (2024), Whatever it takes! How Tonality of News affects Government Bond Yield Spreads in the Eurozone, in: European Journal of Political Economy, 82, available online March 11, 2024.
- Fuchs, R., Göllner, T., Hartmann, S. & Thomas, T. (2024), Fostering Excellent Research by the Austrian Micro Data Center (AMDC), in: Journal of Economics and Statistics/Jahrbücher für Nationalökonomie und Statistik, 244(4), 433-445.
- Bernhardt, L., Dewenter, R. & Thomas, T. (2023), Measuring partisan media bias in the US Newscasts from 2001–2012, in:European Journal of Political Economy, online first: 20. Januar 2023.
- Dewenter, R., Dulleck, U. & Thomas, T. (2020), Does the 4th estate deliver? The Political Coverage Index and its application to media capture, in: Constitutional Political Economy, 31, 292–328.
- Frondel, M. & Thomas, T. (2020), Decarbonization until 2050? Climate Policies and Energy Forecasts for Germany, Austria and Switzerland (in German), in: Journal for Energy Economics/Zeitschrift für Energiewirtschaft, 44, 2020, 195–221.
- Benesch, C., Loretz, S., Stadelmann, D. & Thomas, T. (2019), Media Coverage and Immigration Worries: Econometric Evidence, in: Journal of Economic Behavior & Organization, 160, 52–67.
- Dewenter, R., Linder, M. & Thomas, T. (2019), Can media drive the electorate? The impact of media coverage on voting intentions, in: European Journal of Political Economy, 58, 245–261.
- Berlemann, M. & Thomas, T. (2019), The Distance Bias in Natural Disaster Reporting – Empirical Evidence for the United States, in: Applied Economics Letters, 16, 1026–1032.
- Strohner, L., Berger, J. & Thomas, T. (2018), Champange or seltzer? – Economic consequences of the reluctance to reform the solidarity surcharge (in German), in: Economic Policy Perspectives/Perspektiven der Wirtschaftspolitik, 19, 313–330.
- Thomas, T., Heß, M. & Wagner, G. G. (2017), Reluctant to Reform? A Note on Risk Loving of Politicians and Bureaucrats, in: Review of Economics, 68, 167–179.
- Ulbricht, D., Kholodilin, K. & Thomas, T. (2017), Do media data help to predict German industrial production?, in: Journal of Forecasting, 36, 83–496.
- Beckmann, K., Dewenter, R. & Thomas, T. (2017), Can news draw blood? The impact of media coverage on the number and severity of terror attacks, in: Peace Economics, Peace Science and Public Policy, 23, 1–16.
- Dewenter, R., Heimeshoff, U. & Thomas, T. (2016), Media Coverage and Car Manufacturers' Sales, in: Economics Bulletin, 36, 976–982.
- Thomas, T. (2013), What price makes a good a status good? Results from a mating game, in: European Journal of Law and Economics, 36, 35–55.
- Göbel, M., Schneider, A. & Thomas, T. (2010), Consumption behavior and the aspiration for conformity and consistency, in: Journal of Neuroscience, Psychology, and Economics, 3(2), 83–94.

== Applied scientific publications (selection) ==
- Frondel, M. & Thomas, T. (2020), Decarbonization by 2050? A Highly Ambitious Goal for Germany (in German), in: et - Energy Industry Issues/et - Energiewirtschaftliche Tagesfragen, 70, 20-27.
- Koch P., Schwarzbauer, W. & Thomas, T. (2020), Tenant's Paradise Austria? Myth and Reality (in German), List Forum for Economic and Financial Policy/List Forum für Wirtschafts- und Finanzpolitik, 45, 319-346.
- Schwarzbauer, W. Thomas, T. & Wagner, G. G. (2019), Birds of a Feather Flock Together. A Network Analysis of Policy Advisers (in German), Economics Review/Wirtschaftsdienst, 99, 278-285.
- Cassel, S. & Thomas, T. (2019), The Answer to Robots is Education and Participation (in German), in: List Forum for Economic and Financial Policy/List Forum für Wirtschafts- und Finanzpolitik, 45, 53-55.
- Cassel, S. & Thomas, T. (2018), Strengthen Developing Countries Through Trade Liberalization (in German), in: List Forum for Economic and Financial Policy/List Forum für Wirtschafts- und Finanzpolitik, 44, 65-67.
- Cassel, S. & Thomas, T. (2018), Using the Scope for Sustainable Public Finances Now (in German), in: List Forum for Economic and Financial Policy/List Forum für Wirtschafts- und Finanzpolitik, 43, 483-485.
- Cassel, S., Haucap. J. & Thomas, T. (2017), Take Advantage of the Opportunities of Digitization (in German). In: List Forum for Economic and Financial Policy/List Forum für Wirtschafts- und Finanzpolitik, 43, 189-191.
- Cassel, S. & Thomas, T. (2017), From the "Sick Man of Europe" to "Europe's Engine (in German), in: List Forum for Economic and Financial Policy/List Forum für Wirtschafts- und Finanzpolitik, 43, 63–65.
- Cassel, S. & Thomas, T. (2017), Creating More Equal Opportunities in Education"(in German), in: List Forum for Economic and Financial Policy/List Forum für Wirtschafts- und Finanzpolitik, 42, 333-335.
- Cassel, S. & Thomas, T. (2016), Improve Investment Conditions" (in German), in: List Forum for Economic and Financial Policy/List Forum für Wirtschafts- und Finanzpolitik, 42, 105-107.
- Cassel, S. & Thomas, T. (2016), Adjust Retirement Age Automatically (in German), in: List Forum for Economic and Financial Policy/List Forum für Wirtschafts- und Finanzpolitik, 42, 101-103.
- Cassel, S. & Thomas, T. (2014), With Liability to Stability in the Eurozone (in German), in: List Forum for Economic and Financial Policy/List Forum für Wirtschafts- und Finanzpolitik, 40, 91-93.
- Cassel, S. & Thomas, T. (2014), Conclude Regional Free Trade Agreements Rapidly (in German), in: List Forum for Economic and Financial Policy/List Forum für Wirtschafts- und Finanzpolitik, 40, 201-203.
- Cassel, S. & Thomas, T. (2013), Do not Overstretch the Mandate of the European Central Bank (in German), in: List Forum for Economic and Financial Policy/List Forum für Wirtschafts- und Finanzpolitik, 39, 292-294.
