= Brian Rhodes (Mississippi politician) =

Mississippi politician

Member of the Mississippi State Senate from the 36th district
- Incumbent
- Assumed office January 2, 2024
- Preceded by: Albert Butler

Personal details
- Born: Jackson, Mississippi, U.S.
- Party: Republican
- Education: Mississippi State University
- Occupation: Cattle and poultry farmer

Brian Rhodes is a Mississippi politician, representing the 36th district in the Mississippi State Senate since 2024. His district represents Rankin and Smith counties.

== Biography ==
Rhodes was born in Jackson, Mississippi. He attended East Rankin Academy and Mississippi State University. He is a cattle and poultry farmer and is a member of the Mississippi Farm Bureau, Mississippi Cattlemen's Association, and Mississippi Poultry Association. He was appointed by Governor Tate Reeves to serve on the Mississippi Land, Water and Timber Resources Board.

In 2023, he ran for election to the Mississippi State Senate to represent the 36th district after incumbent Albert Butler ran in the 37th district instead. He won the Republican primary 55% to 45% against Jared Morrison; he went uncontested in the general election. He serves on the following committees: Forestry, Agriculture, County Affairs, Drug Policy, Finance, Highways and Transportation, Insurance, Labor, and Technology.

He endorsed Donald Trump's 2024 presidential campaign.

He is married to Ashley Laird and has three children. He is of non-denominational faith.
