= Lieberman Software =

Lieberman Software Corporation is a cyber security software firm that develops automated privileged identity management and secure privileged access management software.

In January 2018, Lieberman Software got acquired by Bomgar Corporation.

== History ==
The company was first formed as Lieberman and Associates in 1978 by Philip Lieberman.

It became an Independent software vendor in 2004 under the name, "Lieberman Software Corporation".

In May 2014, Lieberman Software introduced new privileged user management (PUM) capabilities in the Enterprise Random Password Manager™ (ERPM) at Microsoft TechEd 2014 in Houston, TX. The new PUM capabilities allow users to launch cross-platform applications in a secure environment, where elevated operations are automatically authorized, recorded and audited.

In the same year Lieberman Software announced a new partner integration with SailPoint IdentityIQ. A few months later at Black Hat in Las Vegas, Lieberman Software announced a partnership with VeriClouds. The same month, Lieberman Software announced its Lieberman RED - Rapid Enterprise Defense™ Suite.

On February 1, 2018, Lieberman Software announced that it was acquired by Bomgar.
