= Laurie Baker (disambiguation) =

Laurie Baker (1917–2007) is a male British-born Indian architect.

Laurie Baker may also refer to:

- Laurie Baker (ice hockey) (born 1976), female American ice hockey player
- Laurie Scott Baker (1943–2022), British composer and musician
- Laurie Baker (figure skater) in 1991 World Junior Figure Skating Championships

== See also ==
- Laurence Baker (disambiguation)
- Lawrence Baker (disambiguation)
- Larry Baker (disambiguation)
