= IPG Group =

Swiss private business

- Industry: Identity management
- Founded: 2001
- Website: www.ipg-group.com

IPG (Information Process Group) is a Swiss identity management services provider and consulting company, established in 2001. The headquarters are in Winterthur, Switzerland with subsidiaries in Austria and Germany.

== History ==
IPG was founded in 2001. In 2006, the company opened a subsidiary in Hamburg, Germany. IPG also launched self-developed software Rolmine for role modeling. In 2010, the company opened a branch in Vienna. Rolemine software was sold to Beta Systems Software AG. In 2013, IPG introduced "IAM as a Service" as a managed service in 2013.

In 2017, the company partnered among others with Beyond Trust, specializing in cyber security to expand IPG Group's product offering. In May 2019 the company won 6.9 million euros public tender of the Austrian Federal Railways (ÖBB) for the introduction and later operation of an IAM. The same year the company has signed Mike Elfner as Head Business Consulting for Switzerland and Austria. In the beginning of 2020 the company opened new office in Dresden.

In 2021 Timetoact Group acquired the majority of the shares of IPG. After the acquisition, IPG will continue to operate independently. In 2021, Claudio Fuchs took over the position as a CEO and replaced Co-founder Marco Rohrer, who remains with the company as chairman of the board of directors.

=== Operations ===
IPG offers IAM services. The company provides advisory, implementation, and application operation of Identity, Governance & Access Management.
