= Joel Carter =

American politician

Joel R. Carter, Jr.
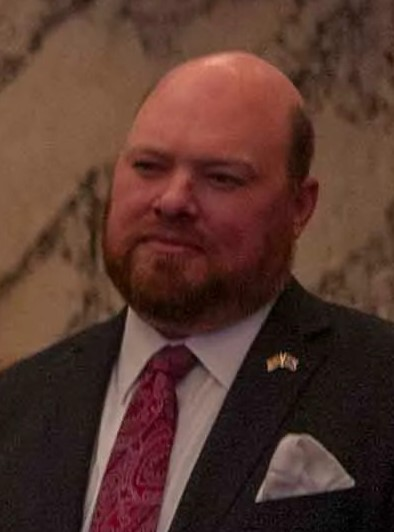

Member of the Mississippi State Senate from the 49th district
- Incumbent
- Assumed office January 10, 2018
- Preceded by: Sean Tindell

Personal details
- Born: August 8, 1978 (age 48) Jackson, Mississippi, U.S.
- Party: Republican
- Children: 4
- Education: University of Southern Mississippi
- Occupation: Insurance

Joel R. Carter Jr. (born August 8, 1978) is an American politician and insurance representative who has served in the Mississippi State Senate from the 49th district since 2018.

== Early life and education ==
Carter was born in Jackson, Mississippi, and attended Gulfport High School. After graduating, he enrolled at the University of Southern Mississippi at its main campus in Hattiesburg.

== Career ==
Carter chairs the Mississippi Senate Energy Committee and is a member of the Corrections, Finance, Highways, and Transportation, Investigate State Offices, Labor, Ports and Marine Resources, and Tourism Senate Committees. He is a Republican. As a member of the state senate, he has pushed for a TikTok ban on state-owned devices.

Carter is a member of the Gulf Coast Chamber, Mississippi Gulf Coast Association of Realtors, Ducks Unlimited, the National Rifle Association of America, Coastal Conservation Association, Gulf Coast Carnival Association, and the Revelers Carnival Association.

== Family ==
He has two sons, Joel Carter III and Garrett Carter. As well as his daughters, Georgia Carter and Sophia Carter.

== Controversies ==
In February 2023, shortly after the Chinese government balloon incident, Carter was criticized for his racism after he posted a photo online of a balloon with words written on it that mock a stereotypical accent of Chinese American and Asian American people.
