= Hank Lott =

American politician (born 1974)

Member of the Mississippi House of Representatives from the 101st district
- In office 2012–2016
- Preceded by: Harvey Fillingane
- Succeeded by: Brad Touchstone

Personal details
- Born: October 7, 1974 (age 51) Hattiesburg, Mississippi, USA
- Party: Republican

Hank Lott (born October 7, 1974) is an American former Republican member of the Mississippi House of Representatives for the 101st District. First elected in 2011, he entered the lower legislative chamber in January 2012. In 2015, he did not run for re-election. Hank's successor was Brad Touchstone.
