= List of mayors of Gulfport, Mississippi =

This article contains a list of mayors of Gulfport, Mississippi, United States.

== List ==
No.	Mayor	In office	Political party	Ref
1	Finley B. Hewes	28 July 1898 – 1899	–	
2	Spencer S. Bullis	1899 – 1902	–	
3	Joseph Ballenger	1902 - 1904	–	
4	Henry D. Moore	1905 - 1906	–	
5	Joseph W. Thomas	1907 - 1908	–	
6	George M. Foote	c. 1907 – c. 1916	–	
7	Joseph W. Thomas	1911 - 1912	–	
8	William H. Bouslog	1913 - 1914	–	
9	George W. Foote	1915 - 1918	–	
	Charles H. Haydon	c. 1919	–	
10	Joseph W. Milner	c. 1925 - c. 1948	Democrat	
	Milton T. "Mitt" Evans	3 Jan 1949 – c. 1950	–	
11	R.B. Meadows	1953 - 1969	–	
12	Philip W. Shaw	March 1971 – May 1973	–	
13	C.L. Bullock	1973 - 11 January 1975	–	
	Charles L. Walker (acting)	January 1975 - 7 March 1975	–	
14	A.W. "Buzzy" Lang	7 March 1975 - 1977	–	
15	John H. "Jack" Barnett	1977 - 1985	Republican	
16	Leroy Urie	1985 - 1989	Democrat	
17	Kincheon Varner "Ken" Combs	June 1989 – 1997	Republican	
18	Robert Short	1997 – June 2001	Republican	
19	Ken Combs	June 2001 – 7 June 2005	Republican	
20	Brent Warr	7 June 2005 – 2009	Republican	
21	George Schloegel	7 June 2009 – 2013	Republican	
22	Billy Hewes	2013 – 2025	Republican	
23	Hugh Keating	2025 – present	Republican	
