= Kai A. Konrad =

German economist (born 1961)

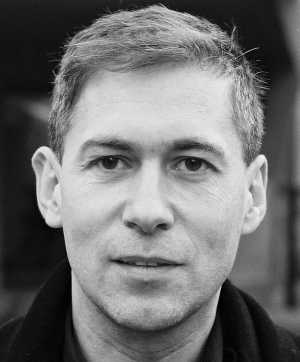
- Born: 1961 (age 64–65); Heidelberg, Baden-Württemberg, Germany

Academic background
- Education: LMU Munich; Heidelberg University
- Thesis: Risikoproduktivität und Besteuerung (1990)
- Doctoral advisor: Hans-Werner Sinn

Academic work
- Discipline: Public Finance; Microeconomics; New political economy
- Institutions: Max Planck Institute for Tax Law and Public Finance
- Awards: Gossen Prize (2000)
- Website: Information at IDEAS / RePEc

Kai Andreas Konrad (born 1961) is a German economist. He is director at the Max Planck Institute for Tax Law and Public Finance. His research areas include public finance, microeconomics, and new political economy.

== Academic career ==
Konrad completed his doctoral studies in 1990 under the supervision of Hans-Werner Sinn at LMU Munich (Dr. oec.publ.) and habilitated in 1993 (rer.pol.habil.) also in Munich. From 1994 to 2009, he was a university professor in the Department of Economics at the Free University of Berlin, and from 2001 to 2009, he was also the director of the Department of Market Processes and Governance at the Social Science Research Center Berlin (WZB). Additionally, he taught and conducted research for many years as a Professor II at the University of Bergen in Norway. Since 2009, he has been a scientific member of the Max Planck Society, serving as Director at the Max Planck Institute for Intellectual Property, Competition and Tax Law from 2009 to 2010, and since 2011, as Director at the Max Planck Institute for Tax Law and Public Finance. He is also an honorary professor at the Free University of Berlin and at LMU Munich.

Since 1999, Konrad has been a member of the Scientific Advisory Board of the Federal Ministry of Finance, serving as deputy chair from 2007 to 2010, and as chair from 2011 to 2014.

Konrad is a member of the German Academy of Natural Scientists Leopoldina, the German Academy of Engineering Sciences (acatech), the Berlin-Brandenburg Academy of Sciences, the European Academy of Sciences and Arts, and the Academia Europaea. Furthermore, he is actively involved in several international scientific networks (see Memberships and Activities).

He has been and continues to be on the editorial board of various international journals in economics and political science, including being one of the two founding editors of Economics of Governance and serving as co-editor of the Journal of Public Economics from 2007 to 2018.

== Research ==
Konrad's research covers a wide range of topics from the fields of economics, public finance, political science, theoretical biology, and operations research. In his academic work, he has focused on subjects such as interstate tax and system competition, the European sovereign debt crisis, energy policy issues related to climate change, and competition for economic or social status.

A topic that has occupied Konrad since the beginning of his career is the role of the pursuit of social status and prestige in economic behavior. In a paper co-authored with Amihai Glazer, he explored how such preferences influence publicly observable donation behavior. In another early paper, he examined the effects of these preferences on aggregate capital formation: excessive capital formation and the emergence of a class society consisting of capitalists and workers. The monograph titled Strategy and Dynamics of Contests provides important theoretical foundations for analyzing competition for high social status and other forms of tournaments. For these "fundamental theoretical contributions to the economic analysis of strategies in tournaments with applications in industrial economics as well as political economy," he was awarded an honorary doctorate by the University of Basel in 2023.

In the discussion surrounding international climate policy, Konrad examined the role of adaptation to climate change as a complement to mitigation strategies. He also made pragmatic suggestions on how to address the rush to burn, i.e., the unexpected and dangerous side effect of an international agreement to ban the burning of hydrocarbons for energy production.

Since the early 2020s, Konrad has focused on the increasingly antagonistic economic and political relationship between the USA and China. He outlines possible future scenarios and raises the question of how smaller countries or the EU can act sensibly in this conflict.

== Economic Policy Activities ==
Konrad has written over 150 articles in international economics and political science journals. In the Handelsblatt Economist Ranking, which has analyzed the research performance of economists in the DACH region based on the quality of publications since 2004, he has consistently ranked among the top 10.

In June 2010, Konrad and Holger Zschäpitz published the first popular science analysis of the European debt crisis, just a few weeks after the signing of the first bailout package for Greece and decisions by the European Commission that ultimately led to the creation of the European Stability Mechanism. The two authors conclude that the combination of individual decision-making rights over national debt with collective liability within a shared currency is incompatible, identifying this as the main structural flaw of the European Monetary Union. Konrad advocates for an organized insolvency procedure for individual member states, calling it the introduction of true fiscal responsibility for nation-states.

Konrad has been actively involved as an economic policy advisor on issues such as public debt in Europe and the federal organization of Germany. In August 2013, Konrad predicted in an interview with the German newspaper Die Welt that the euro had an uncertain but finite life expectancy. He was also an expert before the German Federal Constitutional Court in the proceedings concerning the ECB's OMT program. In 2021, he (together with L. Arnemann and N. Potrafke) examined how differently citizens and experts from the Eurozone countries remember the rescue measures during the Euro crisis. As a member of the Scientific Advisory Board at the Federal Ministry of Finance, he was also an external expert in the Federalism Reform Commission II in Germany. and he advised the High Level Group on Own Resources ("Monti Group") of the European Commission.

== Awards and honors ==
- Hermann Heinrich Gossen Award 2000 of the Verein für Socialpolitik
- Richard Musgrave Visiting Professorship 2016, awarded by the CESifo Group and the IIPF
- Honorary Doctorate from the Faculty of Business and Economics at the University of Basel (awarded in 2023)

== Memberships and Activities (Selection) ==
- Member of the Scientific Advisory Board of the Federal Ministry of Finance (since 1999), Vice Chairman (2007–2010), Chairman (2011–2014).
- ZEW – Leibniz Centre for European Economic Research, Chairman of the Scientific Advisory Board (2017–2024), Member of the Scientific Advisory Board (2000–2024)
- Wirtschaftsdienst, Member of the Scientific Advisory Board (since 2011)
- Norwegian Center for Taxation (NoCeT) at the Norwegian School of Economics, Member of the Scientific Advisory Board (since 2012)
- Econwatch, Member of the Board of Trustees (since 2012)
- CEPR Research Fellow (since 1994)
- CESifo Research Network Fellow (since 1999)
- IZA Research Fellow (since 1999)
- acatech – German Academy of Science and Engineering (since 2012)
- Leopoldina – German National Academy of Sciences (since 2013)[
- Academia Europaea (since 2013)
- Member of the Berlin-Brandenburg Academy of Sciences and Humanities (BBAW) (since 2014)
- European Academy of Sciences and Arts (since 2015)
- Global Labor Organization (GLO) (since 2017)
- Center for Research in Economics, Management and the Arts (CREMA)

== Editorial Services (Selection) ==
- Journal of Public Economics, Co-Editor (2007-2018)
- Economics of Governance, Founding Co-Editor (2000-2007), Board of Associate Editors (since 2008)
- Economic Policy, Senior Editor (2020-2023), Managing Editor (1998-2000)
- German Economic Review, Board of Editors (since 2012)
- World Tax Journal, Editorial Board (2010-2022)
- Journal of Conflict Resolution, Editorial Board (since 2009)
- Journal of Population Economics, Associate Editor (since 2001)

== Books (Selection) ==
- Konrad, Kai A.; Zschäpitz, Holger (2012). Schulden ohne Sühne?: Was Europas Krise uns Bürger kostet Aktualisierte Neuausgabe. Deutscher Taschenbuch Verlag. ISBN 978-3-423-41547-7.
- Konrad, Kai A.; Zschäpitz, Holger (2010). Schulden ohne Sühne?: warum der Absturz der Staatsfinanzen uns alle trifft. C.H.Beck. ISBN 978-3-406-60688-5.
- Konrad, Kai A. (2009). Strategy and Dynamics in Contests. ISBN 978-0-19-954959-7.
- Risikoproduktivität und Besteuerung. Ludwig-Maximilians-Universität München. Munich 1989 (dissertation, Munich 1990).
