= Tyler McCaughn =

American politician

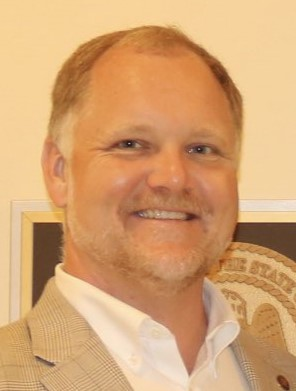

Member of the Mississippi Senate from the 31st district
- Incumbent
- Assumed office January 7, 2020
- Preceded by: Terry C. Burton

Personal details
- Born: Tyler McCaughn; July 14, 1982 (age 44) Morton, Mississippi, U.S.
- Party: Republican
- Education: Jones County Junior College; University of Mississippi; Mississippi College School of Law
- Occupation: Attorney, cattle farmer, businessman
- Website: http://tylermccaughn.com/

Tyler McCaughn (born July 14, 1982) is an American politician serving in the Mississippi State Senate from the 31st district since 2020.

== Early life and education ==
McCaughn was born in Morton, Mississippi, where he attended Morton High School. He attended Jones County Junior College, graduated from the University of Mississippi, and got his Juris Doctor degree from the Mississippi College School of Law.

== Career ==
McCaughn is the owner of several farming-based businesses and a professional limited liability company as an attorney. He served as the former attorney for the town of Hickory, Mississippi; a former municipal judge for the town of Decatur, Mississippi; a former adjunct professor at East Central Community College; and a former attorney for Mississippi Regional Housing Authority V. He is licensed to practice in all state and federal courts in Mississippi.

Following outcry over his third DUI arrest, State Senator Terry C. Burton did not seek reelection for the 31st district. McCaughn competed in the Republican primary for the district, securing 73.3% of the vote and 68.3% of the vote in the general election; he assumed office on January 7, 2020.

As of 2020, he is vice-chair for the Wildlife, Fisheries, and Parks Committee and is a member on the following others: Agriculture; Appropriations; County Affairs; Environment Prot, Cons and Water Res; Forestry; Judiciary, Division A; Judiciary, Division B; and Municipalities.

== Political positions ==
He has called for infrastructure improvements to increase industry and has advocated for lawmakers working together.

He voted against changing the state flag in 2020, although stating that he was "conflicted."

== Personal life ==
McCaughn is a member of the Newton Rotary Club and is an Eagle Scout. He is a board member for the Choctaw Council, Boy Scouts of America. He is of United Methodist faith.
