= Wallace Van Jackson =

American librarian

- Born: May 6, 1900; Richmond, Virginia, United States
- Died: December 14, 1982 (aged 82)
- Education: Virginia Union University; Hampton Institute; University of Michigan
- Occupation: Librarian

Wallace Van Jackson (May 6, 1900 – December 14, 1982) was an American librarian and civil rights activist. He was the director of several academic libraries over his career and was respected for developing collections that promoted the history of African Americans; he was also instrumental in creating reference services and building library collections for multiple libraries in Africa. Van Jackson was part of a group that successfully challenged voter discrimination against African Americans in 1944 in Atlanta, Georgia.

== Early life and education ==
Wallace Van Jackson was born in Richmond, Virginia on May 6, 1900.

In 1934 he earned bachelor's degrees from Virginia Union University and a library science degree from Hampton Institute. The following year he earned a Masters of Arts in library science from the University of Michigan. He also studied at the University of Chicago Graduate Library School from 1939 to 1941.

== Library career ==
Van Jackson was appointed as head librarian of Virginia Union University in 1927 and worked there until 1934. While at VUU, he taught one of the earliest courses on African-American history.

Beginning in 1941, he taught reference and collection development at the Atlanta University School of Library Science. He became the first black librarian of Atlanta University in 1941, serving in that position until 1947. In 1947 he accepted an invitation to work for the United States Information Agency as a public affairs officer in Monrovia, Liberia. While abroad, he also attended the UNESCO Library School held in England as the representative of the Library of Congress.

Van Jackson accepted an offer to head the library at Texas Southern University in 1949. He brought the TSU library to national prominence with his work in creating a graduate school for African Americans and raising funds for library acquisitions as well as a new library building. He worked as a consultant for the Alabama State College from 1952 to 1954, directing their book acquisition project and drawing up architectural plans for the library building. He became the library director at Virginia State College in 1954, devoting most of his energy to the design of the Johnston Memorial Library.

He helped establish library services during additional stays in Africa. From 1962 to 1963, Van Jackson served as deputy director and acquisitions librarian of the National Library of Nigeria. In 1974 the Black Caucus of the American Library Association and the African-American Scholars Council sponsored his work as assistant to the librarian on the Swaziland campus of the University of Botswana, Lesotho and Swaziland; he initiated the library's reference service and created a plan for future development.

While librarian at Mary Holmes College he taught courses in black history; he also taught the African American studies course at Hampton Institute throughout the 1970s. He worked to develop the George Peabody Collection of Black materials at Hampton.

Throughout his career, he was an energetic member and supporter of library organizations; his service to the American Library Association included memberships on the Committee on Intellectual Freedom from 1952 to 1954, the ALA Council from 1956 to 1960, and the Committee on Economic Opportunity Programs from 1965 to 1967. He wrote a number of articles throughout his career, including "Some Pioneer Library Workers," the first published biographies of African-American librarians and "Negro Library Workers," the first objective survey of African American library employees.

== Activism ==
At the 1936 conference of the American Library Association, held in Richmond, its black members were seated in segregated sections of meeting rooms and were forbidden to attend meal functions or register for conference hotel rooms. Van Jackson was outspoken in his criticism of ALA before and after the conference, describing the segregation of black librarians as "a shameful slide backward" in Library Journal. Several U.S. periodicals (such as The Nation and The New Republic) covered this incident in editorials; because of Van Jackson's efforts, ALA adopted a policy that it would no longer meet in cities that did not guarantee equal accommodations for all ALA conference attendees.

As Secretary of the Citizen's Committee on Democratic Primaries, Van Jackson sued the registrar of Atlanta in July 1944 for refusing to send the names of black Americans to the polls, preventing them from voting. The case was settled out of court with the registrar agreeing to send the names to the polls.

== Recognition ==
During his time in Liberia in the 1940s, Van Jackson was awarded the Grade of Officer in the Order of the Star of Africa "in consideration of meritorious and distinguished services rendered to the Republic of Liberia."

Van Jackson was one of the ten winners of the American Library Association's 1976 Special Centennial Citation; his citation read, in part:

Wallace Van Jackson is a distinguished librarian whose leadership in the development of black academic libraries in the United States, in library education, and in the development of library service in Africa has made a lasting impact on librarianship [...]. Through his activities in the American Library Association and as a member of the ALA Council, he was a spokesman for black librarians in the 1930s and 1940s [...]. Throughout his career Wallace Van Jackson has inspired numerous black Americans and Africans to enter the library profession.

In 1972 he was honored as a life member of the Virginia Library Association.
