= Mary Holmes College =

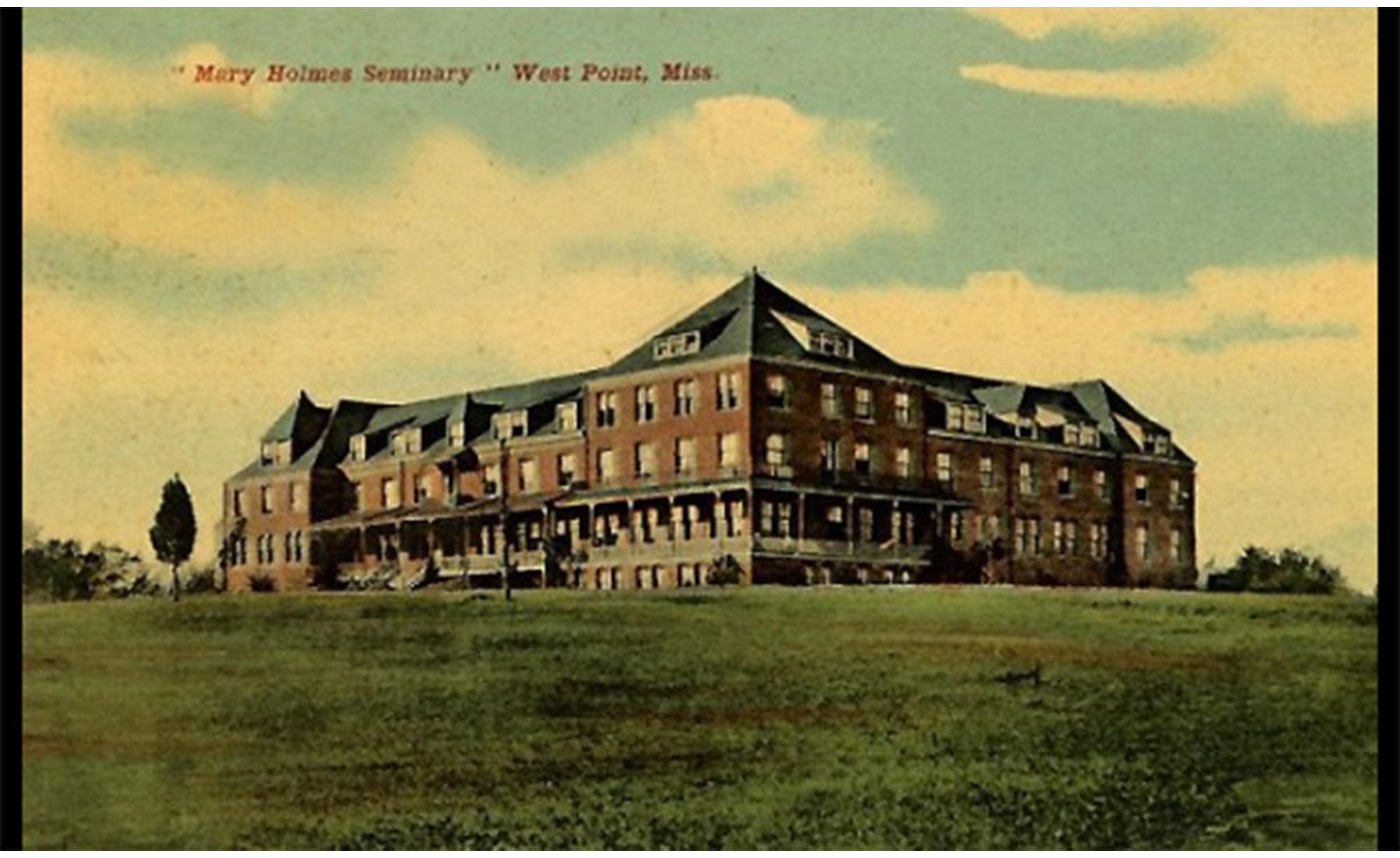
- Motto: Not to Seem, But to Be
- Type: HBCU
- Active: 1892–2005
- Affiliations: Presbyterian Church (United States)
- Location: West Point, Mississippi, United States
- Colors: purple and white
- Mascot: Eagle

Mary Holmes College was a coeducational, historically black college in Mississippi. It was founded to educate young black women under the auspices of the U.S. Presbyterian Church. The site is listed on the National Register of Historic Places as the Mary Holmes Junior College Historic District.

== History ==
=== Founding and early years: 1892–1894 ===
Founded as Mary Holmes Seminary in Jackson, Mississippi, the college began as the brainchild of Reverend Mead Holmes (1819–1906), a Presbyterian missionary, and his daughter, Mary Emilie Holmes (1850–1906). They wanted to start a "literary and industrial school" for young black women in honor of Rev. Holmes's late wife, Mary D. Holmes. The Holmeses' vision was realized in 1892 under the auspices of the Board of Missions for Freedmen of the Presbyterian Church, which funded and oversaw the school during its early years. The initial purpose of the school was to train young black women to become homemakers as well as leaders in the community and the Presbyterian Church. The early faculty and staff were white, and the students they taught ranged in educational level from primary school to high school. The early curriculum was focused around three areas—"Literary, Music and Industrial"—and included courses in literature, grammar, history, science, math, music, Bible studies, and practical domestic arts such as cooking and sewing. The school opened with 90 girls recruited not just locally but from throughout the state.

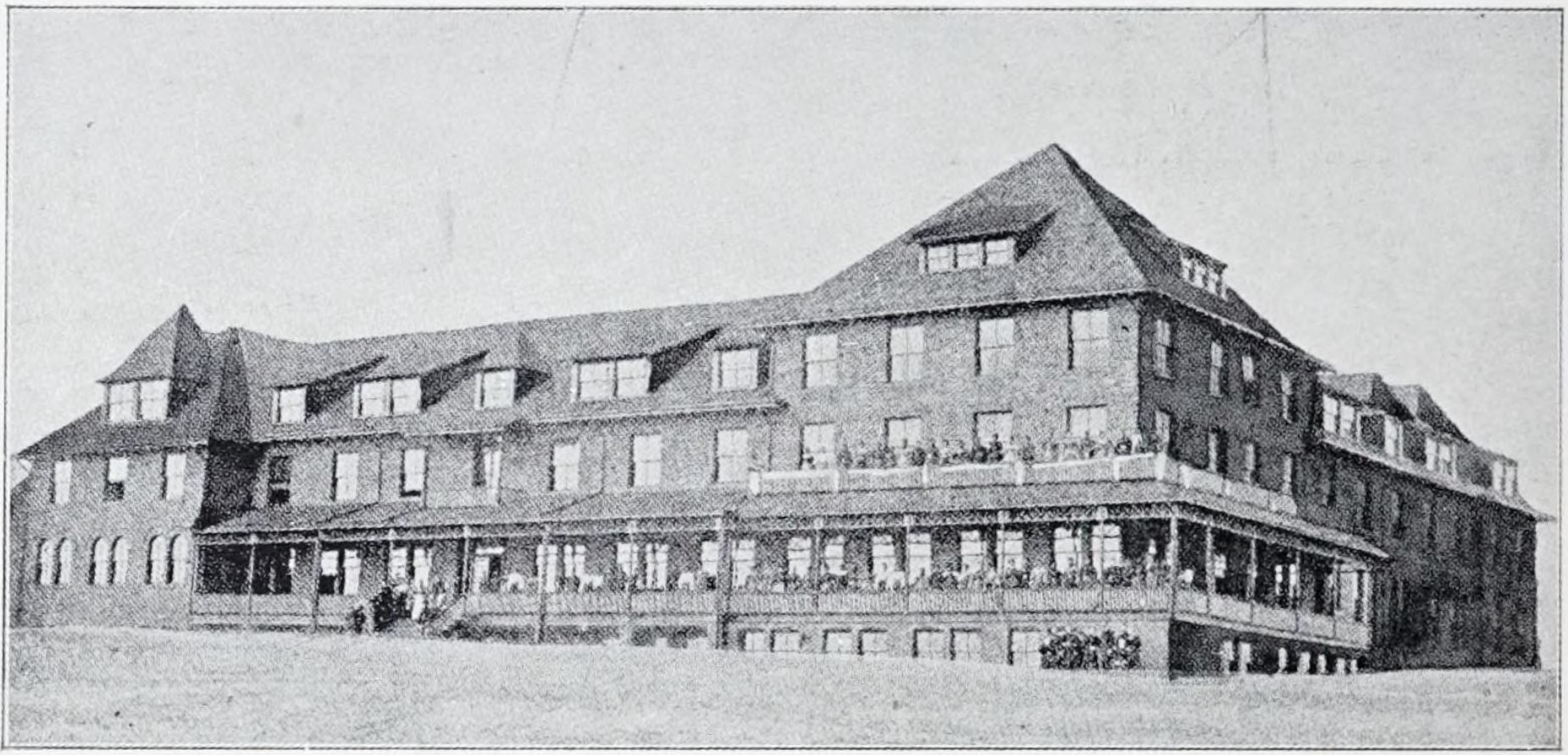
The school in West Point, c. 1910

=== Relocation and expansion: 1895–1969 ===
The seminary, which was built on land in Jackson that had been donated by local black citizens, burned in January 1895, less than three years after its founding. It reopened at a new campus built on 20 acres of donated land on what was then the edge of West Point, Mississippi, where in March 1899 it suffered yet another catastrophic fire. It rebuilt on the same site and reopened in January 1900.

In 1932, it became a coeducational college and shifted its focus to training elementary school teachers for black communities, a change similar to that taking place in other black colleges in the South at that time. In 1959, as the state assumed greater responsibility for K-12 education, the school's focus shifted again and it became an open-admission two-year community college under the new name Mary Holmes Junior College. In 1969, it became an independent two-year college no longer under the direct oversight of the Presbyterian Church and dropped the word 'Junior' from its name.

In 1991, the main buildings of the West Point campus were added to the National Register of Historic Places under the umbrella title Mary Holmes Junior College Historic District in recognition of the college's role as "the major institution for the education of Black students in the Clay County area from its founding in 1897" until desegregation in the 1960s. Among the seven buildings included were the L-shaped Colonial Revival–style Main Hall, the Farmhouse (a former residence of the college's presidents), North Hall (originally the boys' dormitory), the open-air Pavilion, and the Craftsman-style Barr Library, all of which were between 50 and 90 years old at the time. The oldest building was North Hall, built in 1900, and the newest was Main Hall, built in 1939–40.

=== Financial hardship and closing: 1970–2005 ===
During the 1970s and subsequent decades, the mission of Mary Holmes College was to serve economically disadvantaged students from the southeastern United States. It developed articulation agreements with various four-year institutions to help its graduates pursue a full baccalaureate degree. The college struggled to stay afloat, finding difficulty attracting enough students (it had just under 800 students in the mid-1990s) or sufficient funding. In 2002 it lost its accreditation by the Southern Association of Colleges and Schools, and it closed its doors in March 2005. The property (which by then had expanded to 184 acres) and the school's archives returned to the Presbyterian Church.

=== Legacy ===
In 2010, the Mississippi Department of Archives and History approved an historical marker for the college. Also in 2010, the church sold the campus, with its 25 buildings, to Community Counseling Services, an organization that provides mental health and addiction counseling services. The organization renovated a number of the existing buildings, including the chapel, and has plans for turning one building into a small museum honoring the college's history and serving as a location for reunions.

== Notable people ==
=== Alumni ===
- Bennie Turner (1948–2012), broadcaster, lawyer, and legislator

=== Faculty ===
- Wallace Van Jackson (1900–1982), librarian and civil rights activist
