= Jeramey Anderson =

American politician from Mississippi (born 1991)

Member of the Mississippi House of Representatives from the 110th district
- Incumbent
- Assumed office November 26, 2013
- Preceded by: Billy Broomfield

Personal details
- Born: December 6, 1991 (age 34) Pascagoula, Mississippi, U.S.
- Party: Democratic
- Education: Pearl River Community College (AS); Tulane University (BS)
- Website: www.jerameyanderson.com

Jeramey Anderson (born December 6, 1991) is an American politician serving as a member of the Mississippi House of Representatives from the 110th district.

== Early life and education ==
Born in Pascagoula, Mississippi on December 6, 1991, Anderson graduated from Moss Point High School. He earned an associate degree in criminal justice from Pearl River Community College, attending on a soccer scholarship. He then went on to Tulane University, where he completed his bachelor's degree in homeland security.

== Career ==
When he was 16, he founded a nonprofit to mentor young men. Anderson was recognized as an “Early Riser” at the 2015 BET Honors.

=== Mississippi House of Representatives ===
After finishing first in a nonpartisan special election on November 5, 2013, he ran against the former mayor of Moss Point, Aneice Liddell, in a runoff election to replace then-Representative Billy Bromfield, who vacated his House seat after winning the election mayor of Moss Point. Anderson beat Aneice Liddell in the runoff by 59% to 41%. He was sworn in on his 22nd birthday, making him the youngest member of the Mississippi Legislature.

Running as a Democrat, Anderson was reelected in 2015. In 2017, he filed for the 4th Congressional District and won the Democratic primary unopposed in June 2018. He faced four-term incumbent Republican Steven Palazzo and Reform Party candidate Lajena Sheets in the general election in November 2018. Anderson lost to Palazzo 68.2% to 30.7%.

Anderson announced on November 11, 2020 that he would be running for mayor of Moss Point in the 2021 elections. He lost to primary opponent Billy Knight.

In 2017, Anderson led efforts to thoroughly vet the state education budget formula.

== Personal life ==
Anderson is Catholic.
