= Laurence Baker =

Laurence Baker may refer to:

- Laurence S. Baker (1830–1907), officer in the Confederate States Army
- Laurie Baker (Laurence Wilfred Baker, 1917–2007), Indian architect

== See also ==
- Lawrence Baker (disambiguation)
- Larry Baker (disambiguation)
- Laurie Baker (disambiguation)
