= Mary Emilie Holmes =

American geologist

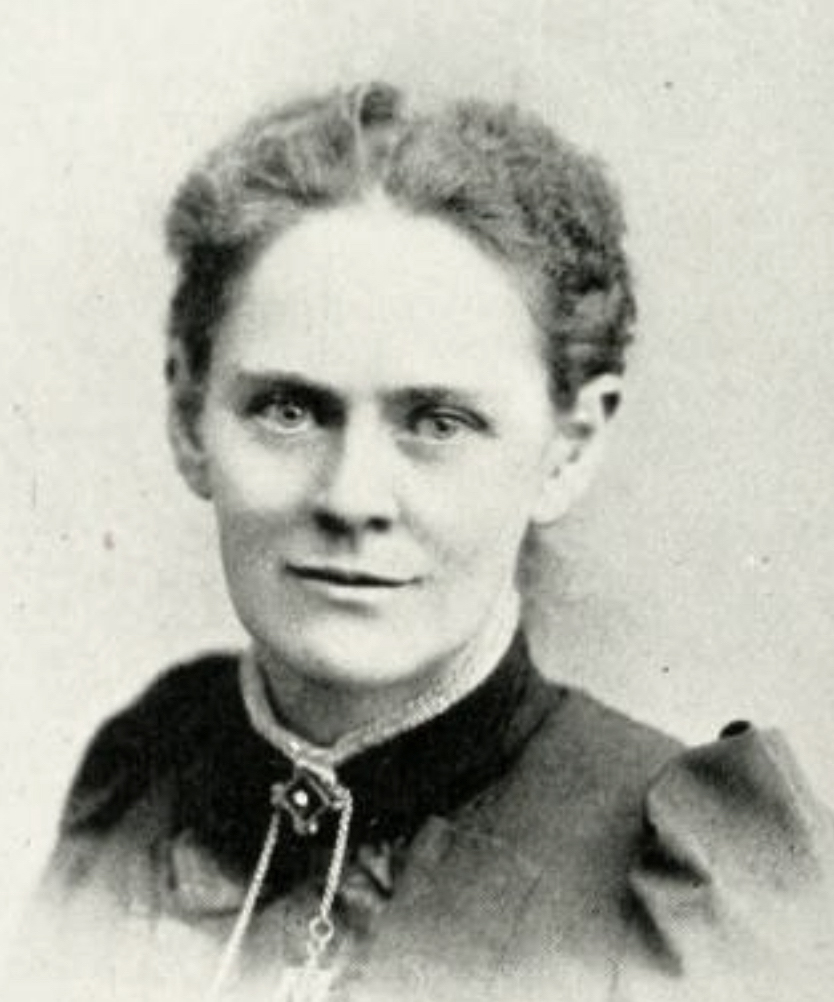
- Born: April 10, 1850; Chester, Ohio, U.S.
- Died: February 13, 1906 (aged 55); Rockford, Illinois, U.S.
- Education: University of Michigan
- Known for: First woman elected to the Geological Society of America
- Scientific career
- Fields: Geology

Mary Emilie Holmes (April 10, 1850 – February 13, 1906) was an American geologist, educator, and the first woman to be elected a fellow of the Geological Society of America.

She co-founded a seminary for young Black women that evolved into the Mary Holmes College, named in memory of her mother.

== Early life and education ==
Mary Emilie Holmes was born April 10, 1850, in Chester, Ohio, to the Rev. Mead Holmes (1819–1906), a Presbyterian minister and missionary, and Mary D. Holmes (1819–1890). She was their second child; her brother, Mead Jr., was nine years older. When Mary Emilie was three, the family moved to Manitowoc, Wisconsin, where the Holmeses did mission work among local Native Americans and became abolitionists. Her mother also ran a women's seminary for two years.

Mary Emilie showed an aptitude for language, and by listening in on her brother's lessons had picked up the rudiments of Greek, Latin, and French by the time she was eight years old. She also demonstrated a precocious interest in science, starting her first herbarium at the age of five and turning her family home (and later her own home) into a menagerie with her collections of tamed animals, including at different times squirrels, chipmunks, raccoons, gophers, foxes, woodchucks, a bald eagle, owls, and various small birds.

Mary Emilie's brother died unexpectedly of a ruptured blood vessel in April 1863 in Murfreesboro, Tennessee, while serving as a soldier on the Union side during the Civil War. The following year, the family moved to Rockford, Illinois where Rev. Holmes became active in local politics. Mary D. Holmes became secretary of the Woman's Presbyterian Board of Missions of the Northwest and was active in working for the welfare of freedmen after the Civil War ended.

Mary Emilie got her schooling at Rockford Female Seminary, which she entered at age 14 and from which she graduated with a certificate in 1868. She then began teaching Spencerian penmanship at the seminary while she studied for a second certificate, in organ performance, which she earned in 1870. She later joined her parents in working with freedmen under the auspices of the Presbyterian Board of Missions for Freedmen.

== Teaching and science career ==
In 1877, Mary Emilie Holmes returned to the seminary, teaching botany and chemistry there until 1885; among her students in this period was the suffragist Jane Addams. When the seminary began issuing the A.B. degree in 1881–82, Holmes quickly petitioned to be granted the baccalaureate. Although some faculty felt that she should be awarded the degree without any further coursework or examinations being required, there was enough dissent from this position that Holmes in the end sat for some examinations before receiving her A.B. degree in 1882. In 1885, she left the seminary to do graduate work at the University of Michigan, where she earned an M.A. in the Literary Department in 1886 and a Ph.D. degree in 1888. The subject of her dissertation was the morphology of corals and her field of study was geology and paleontology. She was the first woman to earn a doctorate in earth science from the university.

Between 1887 and 1892, Holmes traveled around on a series of geological research trips. Although geology was her main area of research, she also gained respect as a botanist: as early as 1876, her name was third on a list of botanical authorities in a catalogue of Illinois plants. She accumulated a large collection of scientific specimens, including more than a thousand bird and animal skins, more than two thousand shells, several hundred slides, and many fossils, minerals, and plants, all carefully catalogued and labeled. A gifted artist, Holmes painted and drew a range of natural subjects.

In 1889 Holmes became the first female Fellow of the Geological Society of America, in part to honor her "original scientific investigation and discovery" and in part because she had been awarded a doctoral degree in the field. Three years later, she gave a talk before the Women's Department of the World's Congress Auxiliary of the World's Columbian Exposition in Chicago, urging the importance of teaching geology early in children's education. Holmes's career as a scientist was very short, encompassing mainly the years between 1885 and 1892; this may have been due in part to the fact that this was a period when the earth sciences were considered the exclusive realm of men and there were few precedents for women making a career in the field. It would be the second woman elected to the Geological Society of America, Florence Bascom, who would become the first American woman to attain a career as a fully professional geologist and college professor.

== Educational activism and writing ==
Holmes turned her attention to education and focused her efforts on the needs of African-Americans. Through her membership in the Presbyterian Board of Missions for Freedmen, she traveled around in the late 1880s giving speeches in support of education for freedmen. Through this board, she became involved in an attempt to open a school for African-Americans, the Monticello Academy, in Monticello, Arkansas. However, death threats forced the school's first principal, the Rev. C.S. Mebane, to close the school and leave town. After her mother's death in 1890, Marie Emilie and her father began to plan the founding of a new seminary for young black women to honor Mary D. Holmes. The Holmeses' vision was realized in 1892 under the auspices of the church's Board of Missions for Freedmen, which funded and oversaw the Mary Holmes Seminary through its early years in Jackson and later West Point, Mississippi. Their initial goal was to train the girls to become homemakers as well as leaders in the community and the Presbyterian Church. The early faculty and staff were white, and the students they taught ranged in educational level from primary school to high school. The curriculum was focused around three areas—"Literary, Music and Industrial"—and included courses in literature, grammar, history, science, math, music, Bible studies, and practical domestic arts such as cooking and sewing. The Mary Holmes Seminary survived many vicissitudes, including two catastrophic fires, eventually evolving in the 20th century into a two-year, coeducational historically black college named Mary Holmes College. Holmes put a great deal of effort into raising funds to rebuild the seminary after each of its fires, even serving briefly as its president after the second one.

Throughout her life, Holmes was active in the Presbyterian Church, serving as the longtime organist for the Westminster Presbyterian Church of Rockford and holding down a number of church offices including the presidency of the Westminster Church Woman's Home Missionary Society (an office her mother had held before her). Members of this society raised money for Christian schools and in support of women missionary teachers. They also wrote a collaborative novel entitled His Father's Mantle (1895), the story of a missionary couple in the Pacific Northwest. Holmes must have enjoyed this experience as she subsequently joined in on another collaborative novel being written by a different group. Entitled Aida Rocksbege and the White Stone (1897), it is the story of a woman who discovers that she is of part African-American heritage and subsequently dedicates her life to establishing a school in the rural South for poor black children. Some scholars hold that it is at least partly autobiographical.

Holmes died at home in Rockford on February 13, 1906, at the age of 55, predeceasing her father by a few months and leaving behind "one of the finest private scientific collections in the west." She is said to have continued her work for freedmen until very shortly before her death.

== Selected works ==
=== Co-author ===
- His Father's Mantle (1895)
- Aida Rocksbege and the White Stone (1897)

== See also ==
- Timeline of women in science
