= Northeast Community College =

Community college system in northeast Nebraska

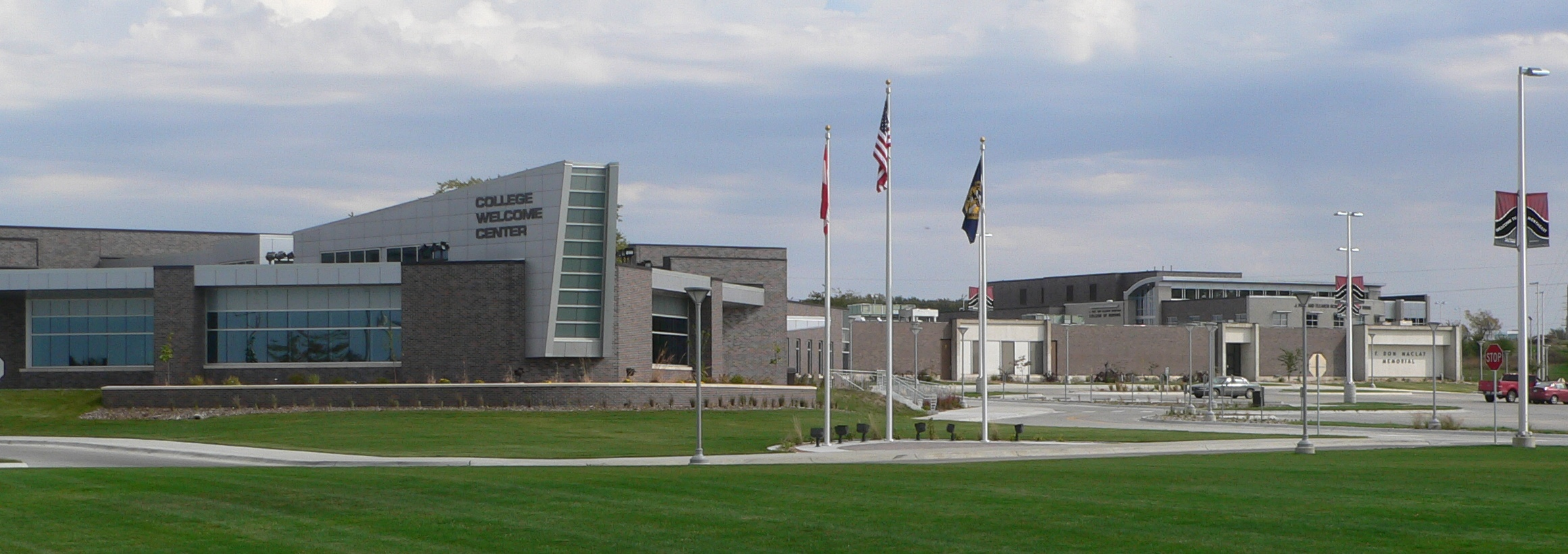
- Main campus in Norfolk
- Former names: Norfolk Junior College (1928–1968); Northeastern Nebraska College (1968–1973); Northeast Nebraska Technical Community College (1973–1975); Northeast Technical Community College (1975–1991)
- Accreditation: Higher Learning Commission
- President: Leah Barrett
- Location: 801 East Benjamin Avenue, Norfolk, Nebraska, 68701, U.S.
- Campus: Suburban
- Nickname: Northeast Hawks
- Sporting affiliations: NJCAA Divisions I and II
- Mascot: Hawk
- Website: northeast.edu
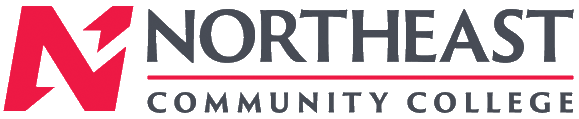

Northeast Community College is a public community college system in northeast Nebraska with four campuses: Norfolk, O'Neill, South Sioux City, and West Point. The college was established by the Nebraska State Legislature in 1973. It was created by a merger of Northeastern Nebraska College and Northeast Nebraska Technical College.

== History ==
In 1928, the Norfolk Board of Education established Norfolk Junior College as a part of the public school system. The board separated the junior college from the public school district in 1968, and renamed it the Northeastern Nebraska College.

Separately, in 1965, the Nebraska Legislature passed a law allowing voters in Norfolk and the surrounding area to create a vocational school district. In 1967, the State Board of Education approved a proposal to create the Northeast Nebraska Vocational-Technical School District, which included Antelope, Boyd, Burt, Cedar, Cuming, Dixon, Holt, Knox, Madison, Pierce, Stanton, Thurston, Wayne, and Wheeler counties. Voters approved the creation of the district on June 27, 1967, with 82 percent of the vote. The technical college opened in 1969, and on November 7, 1972, voters in Brown, Dakota, Garfield, Keya Paha, and Rock counties, and northern Boone and northwestern Dodge counties, voted to join the Northeast Nebraska Technical College district.

In 1971, the state legislature established a statewide system of community technical colleges, which merged junior colleges with vocational-technical schools, effective on July 1, 1973. The college's board of governors approved a plan to consolidate all classes on the same campus, and the schools were merged into the Northeast Nebraska Technical Community College.

In 1991, the Legislature passed a bill removing the word "technical" from all community college names, and the college was neamed the Northeast Community College. In February 2005, Northeast Community College and Wayne State College jointly announced a new campus in South Sioux City. The college opened at the campus, known as Westside Tech Park, in August of that same year. In 2010, the college opened the J. Paul and Eleanor McIntosh College of Nursing in partnership with the University of Nebraska Medical Center. In 2024, the college re-branded to a new logo, with an N containing an arrow pointing Northeast.

== Academics ==
Undergraduate demographics as of 2025
Race and ethnicity	Total
White	73%
Hispanic	16%
Asian	4%
Two or more races	2%
Native American	1%
Black	1%
International student	6%
Unknown	2%
Economic diversity
Low-income (Note: The percentage of students who received an income-based federal Pell grant intended for low-income students.)	37%
Affluent (Note: The percentage of students who are a part of the American middle class at the bare minimum.)	63%

Northeast Community College is a public community college. As of 2025, the college has 2,400 students enrolled. Major Fields of Study include Liberal Arts and Sciences, Health and Medical Preparatory Programs, Teachers Education and Professional Development, Electrical and Power Transmission, and Business Administration.

== Campuses ==
The main campus is located in Norfolk. The college also has extended campuses in West Point, South Sioux City, and O'Neill.

== Notable alumni ==
- Buay Tuach, American-Ethiopian basketball player
- Martin Keane, Canadian basketball player
- Preston Love Jr., American politician and activist
- Eric Powell, American politician, member of the Mississippi Senate from 2008 to 2012
