= Larry Baker (disambiguation) =

Larry Baker (1937–2000) is an American football player.

Larry Baker may also refer to:

- Larry Baker (basketball) from Cleveland Cavaliers draft history
- Larry Baker (politician) in 2004–08 Mississippi Legislature
- Larry Baker (screenwriter) from The Flamingo Rising
- Larry Baker, character in That Uncertain Feeling (film)

== See also ==
- Laurence Baker (disambiguation)
- Lawrence Baker (disambiguation)
