= Lawrence Baker =

Lawrence Baker may refer to:

- Lawrence Baker (tennis) (1890–1980), president of United States Tennis Association
- Lawrence Baker (architect) (1917–2007), British-born Indian architect
- Lawrence Baker (fighter), see Raymond Daniels (martial artist)
- Lawrence Baker (burgess) (c. 1620–1681), planter and politician in the Colony of Virginia
- Lawrence James Baker, English stockbroker and politician

== See also ==
- Laurence Baker (disambiguation)
- Larry Baker (disambiguation)
- Laurie Baker (disambiguation)
