= Rita Potts Parks =

American politician

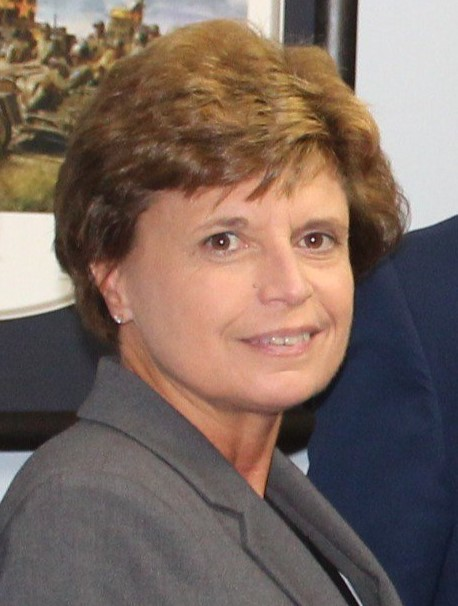

Member of the Mississippi State Senate from the 4th district
- Incumbent
- Assumed office January 3, 2012
- Preceded by: Eric Powell

Personal details
- Born: Rita Potts Parks; December 18, 1962 (age 63) Corinth, Mississippi, U.S.
- Party: Republican
- Children: 1
- Education: Northeast Mississippi Community College (AS); University of Mississippi (BS); State Technical Institute (AS)
- Occupation: Quality and regulatory affairs

Rita Potts Parks (born 1962) is a Mississippi politician serving as a Republican member of the Mississippi State Senate, representing the 4th district since 2012. Her district represents parts of Alcorn and Tippah counties.

== Early life and education ==
Parks was born on December 18, 1962, in Corinth, Mississippi. She attended Alcorn Central High School. After high school, she went to Northeast Mississippi Community College, graduating with an Associate of Science in Biology in 1982. She entered the University of Mississippi in late 1982 and graduated with a Bachelor of Science in Biology/Biological Sciences in 1985. In 1987, she entered State Technical Institute, earning an Associate of Science in Industrial Engineering in 1989.

== Career ==
Parks ran for election for Mississippi Senate District 4 in 2011, where she ran unopposed in the Republican primary. She won the general election by a narrow margin, earning 50.7% of the vote; she assumed office on January 3, 2012. Her district includes parts of Alcorn County and Tippah County.

For the 2024 session, she chairs the Local and Private committee and is the vice-chair for the Highways and Transportation committee; she is a member of Appropriations, Business and Financial Institutions, County Affairs, Energy, Investigate State Offices, Medicaid, and Public Health and Welfare.

== Political positions ==
She voted for changing the Mississippi state flag in 2020.

== Personal life ==
She is a member of the National Rifle Association, the Kiwanis service club, the American Society for Quality, and the Parenteral Drug Association.

Parks is married and has one daughter. She is a Baptist.
