= Oklahoma county commissioner scandal =

The Oklahoma county commissioners scandal was a political corruption scandal in the United States. Brought to light in the 1980s through the OKSCAM investigation by the US Federal Bureau of Investigation, the investigation resulted in hundreds of people being charged with taking kickbacks or stealing public money. At the time, it was the largest public corruption case ever in the US, and resulted in convictions or guilty pleas from at least 230 people across 60 of the state's 77 counties, including 110 people who were actively serving as county commissioners when they were charged. The kickbacks and fake charges had siphoned off about US$200 million ($782 million in current money) per year from county funds by inflating the cost of road-building supplies.

The prosecutions were highly successful at removing corrupt officials from office.

== Background ==
Each of the 77 counties in Oklahoma was required to have three county commissioners, resulting in a statewide total of 231 county commissioners at any given time. Although according to law, they were supposed to work together as one body, in practice they operated individually, with each focusing on their local roads district instead of countywide needs. Each commissioner had, in the words of a 1981 report, "unchecked autonomy". This had been the case for decades, and some of the risks had been identified in the 1958 Sandlin Report.

== Initial investigation ==
Suppliers had been paying kickbacks to commissioners for decades. One version involved submitting false invoices: The company would send an invoice for the supplies needed to build a bridge or a road, which the county would pay. The materials would not be delivered, and the supplier would use the money from the county government to pay bribes to the county commissioners. An instance of this was discovered in 1978 by investigator Charles Muse from the Oklahoma Auditor and Inspector's office, when he noticed that Stephens County had paid in a single year for as much bridge-building timber as would be needed to rebuild each of the county's 340 bridges five times. The local prosecutor did not pursue the case adequately, so the FBI and the IRS created a joint investigation, CORCOM. After several false starts, they were able to find some suppliers who were willing to provide information about the corrupt practices.

== Prosecutions ==
Former commissioners were charged along with those in office, and the suppliers they accepted bribes from. Many of the arrests were made by federal law enforcement officers in the spring of 1981. As of February 1984, 230 officials and businessmen had either been convicted or plead guilty to charges related to corruption, and only a few possible plea bargains were still being negotiated.

Charges included mail fraud, tax evasion and extortion.

People were convicted in 60 of the state's 77 counties. County commissioners resigned in 69 counties. In 13 counties, all three commissioners left office.

The cases were prosecuted by three U.S. Attorneys: Bill Price, Gary Richardson, and the future state governor, Frank Keating.

== Causes and reforms ==
The corruption was possible due to institutional weaknesses. The culture of Oklahoma was within the national norms in terms of how willing members of the public are to tolerate bribery and other forms of public corruption, and when the scandal was exposed, voters rejected corruption and supported reforms. The problems were primarily structural instead of cultural. Almost every aspect of road building was entirely at the discretion of the county commissioners, and the pressure from voters encouraged them to justify their criminal choices to themselves. Additionally, oversight of the county commissioners was limited, so wrongdoing was less likely to be discovered, and the commissioners and the suppliers believed that kickbacks were a normal part of doing business, which increased the likelihood of corruption.

After the scandal broke in the spring of 1981, Oklahoma Governor George Nigh appointed a task force and called a special session of the state legislature. The governor's task force, which had no budget and no authority to compel responses from people they contacted, produced a report suggesting some reforms, generally making the commissioners less beholden to the local district, increasing their number, making some administrative positions non-elected, and reducing commissioners' involvement in the day-to-day process of selecting and paying suppliers. The counties opposed these reforms, and Nigh quietly set them aside in favor of some modest proposals, such as requiring open bids for more purchases, implementing a separation of duties that required someone other than the person who approved a purchase to attest that the goods were received, providing anti-corruption training, and having the district attorney paid by the state. The resulting reforms improved local record keeping and made it easier to discover and prosecute any future corruption. However, the system of electing a commissioner for an individual road district was preserved, commissioners retained most of their autonomy, and in 1990, the state legislature weakened one of the reforms around large purchases.

The nearby state of Mississippi had a similar, though smaller, scandal called Operation Pretense in the 1980s. The reforms put in place by Oklahoma were much weaker than the actions taken by Mississippi.

== See also ==
- Federal prosecution of public corruption in the United States
