= Billy Hewes =

American politician

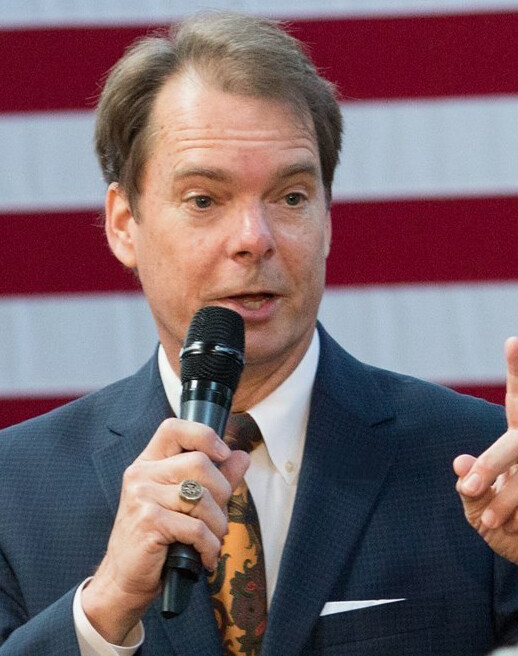

Mayor of Gulfport, Mississippi
- In office June 28, 2013 – June 30, 2025
- Preceded by: George Scholegel
- Succeeded by: Hugh Keating

President pro tempore of the Mississippi State Senate
- In office January 1, 2008 – January 3, 2012
- Preceded by: Travis Little
- Succeeded by: Terry W. Brown

Member of the Mississippi State Senate from the 49th district
- In office January 7, 1992 – January 3, 2012
- Preceded by: Bob Usey
- Succeeded by: Sean Tindell

Personal details
- Born: William Gardner Hewes III; October 27, 1961 (age 64) New Iberia, Louisiana, U.S.
- Party: Republican
- Spouse: Paula Hewes
- Children: 4
- Education: Harrison Central High School
- Alma mater: University of Southern Mississippi (BS)
- Occupation: State legislator; Insurance agent; Real estate broker

William Gardner Hewes III (born October 27, 1961) is an American Republican politician. He served as the mayor of Gulfport, Mississippi from 2013 to 2025. He is also the former President pro tempore of the Mississippi State Senate.

== Early life and education ==
Hewes was born in New Iberia, Louisiana October 27, 1961 and moved to Gulfport, Mississippi, where he attended Harrison Central High School. He later graduated from the University of Southern Mississippi in 1984 with a Bachelor of Science in Business Administration.

== Political career ==
=== Mississippi State Senate ===
Hewes represented Senate District 49, which contained Harrison County, Mississippi. He served from his election in 1992 until 2012, serving as President Pro Tempore from 2008 until 2012.

Hewes was also the founding chairman of the Mississippi National Guard Legislative Caucus while in the Senate. As Senator, Hewes authored Mississippi’s Seller’s Disclosure Statement for Real Estate transactions, as well as Mississippi’s Prepaid College Tuition Program (MPACT), and funding for the Lynn Meadows Children’s Museum. An advocate for business interests, he was engaged in Tort reform initiatives, as well as early efforts to change the State Flag.

=== 2011 Lieutenant Governor race ===
Hewes was an unsuccessful candidate for the office of Lieutenant Governor of Mississippi in 2011. After losing the Republican primary election to Tate Reeves by a 14-point margin, Hewes endorsed him in the general election.

=== Mayor of Gulfport ===
Billy Hewes, a Republican, serves as the Mayor of Gulfport, Mississippi, the state's second largest city, having won office in the 2013 City of Gulfport General Election, in which he ran unopposed. Hewes’s leadership was instrumental in the construction of the Mississippi Aquarium, the creation of the Harbor Lights Winter Festival, and support of the emerging blue economy, which is bringing a new maritime research and development component to the region’s economy. As Mayor of Mississippi’s largest coastal city, Hewes publicly advocated for a change to Mississippi’s State Flag.

== Political membership ==
He served as National Chairman of the American Legislative Exchange Council and as chairman of the Gulf States Marine Fisheries Commission. As Mayor, Hewes served an unprecedented two terms as Chairman of the Mississippi Municipal League (2019-2021), and since 2018, he has served on the U.S. Department of Commerce First Responder Network Authority Board. He is also a member of the advisory board for the U.S. Department of Interior National Park System.

A graduate of Leadership Mississippi and Leadership Gulf Coast, Hewes is a member of the Gulf Coast Chamber of Commerce, and is a past president of the Gulfport Jaycees. Hewes also serves on the Board of the South Mississippi Planning and Development District.

== Consumer Product Safety Commission ==
President Donald Trump nominated Hewes to serve as a member of the Consumer Product Safety Commission for a term ending in 2031. Hewes withdrew his nomination on March 12, 2026.

== Family history and personal life ==
The Hewes family is one of the founding families of the City of Gulfport. Hewes is related to the first Mayor of Gulfport. In addition, Billy's grandfather served as a Chancery judge, and his father served on the Gulfport City Council. He is married to Paula Hewes (née Morton) and has four children. His mother-in-law Ruby Morton, was a national Goodwill Ambassador for South Mississippi.

Hewes is an insurance agent and real estate broker with The Hewes Agency and Billy Hewes Real Estate. He is also a songwriter and musician, having served on the Mississippi Blues Commission. Hewes has had songs featured in two movie soundtracks (Stay with Me - Precious Cargo), (Mississippi Christmas - Christmas in MS) and his band, Cut Bait, performs at festivals and fundraising events. The album, “She’s Got the Moves,” was released in 2021.

== Awards ==
Hewes was named Legislator of the Year by the Mississippi Association of Realtors.
