= Albert Butler =

American politician

Member of the Mississippi State Senate
- Incumbent
- Assumed office 2010
- Preceded by: Vincent Davis
- Constituency: 36th district (2010–2024); 37th district (2024–present)

Personal details
- Born: 1947 (age 79) Port Gibson, Mississippi
- Party: Democratic
- Children: 4
- Education: Alcorn State University (BS); Jackson State University (MS)

Albert Butler (born 1947) is an American politician who has served as a Democratic member of the Mississippi State Senate since 2010. He represents the 37th district, having previously represented the 36th district, and was elected following a special election after the departure of his predecessor. Prior to his tenure in the state legislature, Butler served multiple terms as a Claiborne County supervisor. He was indicted in Operation Pretense in the 1980s for mail fraud but was found innocent of all charges.

He is a graduate of Alcorn State University and Jackson State University and has worked as a farmer, small businessman, school teacher, and academic manager for Mississippi Job Corps.

== Early life and education ==
Born in 1947 in Port Gibson, Mississippi, Butler graduated from Alcorn State University with a bachelor of science and Jackson State University with a master of science.

He has worked as a farmer, small businessman, and public school teacher. He has worked as an academic manager for Mississippi Job Corps.

== Political career ==
=== County supervisor ===
Butler began his political career in 1983, challenging incumbent Claiborne County supervisor and board president William Matt Ross for the District 1 seat. Running as an independent, he defeated Ross with over 63 percent of the vote. His victory was part of a larger set of progressive victories for reform in the county.

As a Claiborne County supervisor, he was charged in September 1987 for mail fraud in Operation Pretense, a sting operation against county officials. Despite the charges, he easily won re-election as a Democrat over two independents in November 1987. He was found innocent in 1998, the only one of the 57 charged in the operation.

In 1991, he defeated four opponents in the Democratic primary with a little over 52 percent of the vote. He won in the general over an independent candidate with 64 percent of the vote.

Butler lost re-election in the Democratic primary in 1995 against Evan Doss, the county tax collector and assessor who had supported Butler's 1983 campaign. Butler secured 47 percent of the vote. Butler had challenged Doss's eligibility, for he did not live in the district. While his initial challenge was denied by the Claiborne County Executive Committee due to Butler missing a deadline, Butler later secured a court victory from then-Circuit Judge Keith Starrett.

He narrowly won re-election in the 1999 primary, winning by 73 votes; he won over three independent candidates in the November general election.

While board president, Butler was forced to a runoff in the Democratic primary for his District 1 seat in 2003, receiving just 26 votes short of securing a majority. He lost in the runoff against Democrat Allen Burks by 13 votes, ending his time in county government.

=== Senator ===
Butler, no longer in county office, ran for election to the Mississippi State Senate for the 36th district in 2007. He received the most votes in the primary and advanced to a runoff against Democrat Vincent Davis. He lost against Davis, securing about 45 percent of the vote. However, in early 2010, Davis was appointed as a chancery judge. Butler ran in the special election and was elected to the Mississippi State Senate in a March 2010; he was inaugurated later that month.

== Personal life ==
He is married with four children. He is Baptist.
