= Operation Pretense =

FBI sting operation

Operation Pretense was a sting operation conducted by the U.S. Federal Bureau of Investigation (FBI) in the mid-1980s that resulted in convictions against 71 people, including 55 county supervisors, on corruption-related charges such as bribery and extortion in the state of Mississippi. The investigation began in March 1984 and lasted until late 1987, with the first indictments being issued on February 13 of that year.

In the early 1980s, each of Mississippi's 82 counties were divided into five districts, each overseen by an elected supervisor who was responsible for almost all government functions within their district, including financial activities regarding county infrastructure. This system, which allowed supervisors unchecked control over almost all routine purchases with no requirement for records-keeping or inventorying, led to abuses on the part of the supervisors who benefitted from payoffs and kickbacks from vendors operating in their district. In 1982, businessman John Burgess contacted the FBI after a salesman for a pipe company he had recently bought a stake in told him that he had been required to give a kickback to a supervisor in order to do business in that district. The FBI began an investigation which they named "Operation Pretense", a shortening of "Operation Preacher's Ten Percent Supervisors' Expense", which was a reference to Burgess's other career as a Pentecostal minister. Burgess agreed to open a front organization for the FBI and worked with special agents who posed as salesmen, recording testimony from supervisors and other vendors and gaining evidence on the corruption. In total, 57 supervisors from 25 counties were indicted, and 55 were found guilty, of at least one felony charge. Additionally, the investigation resulted in guilty charges against 13 vendors, two commissioners for the Mississippi State Highway Commission, and one county road foreman.

Following the indictments, Mississippi State Auditor Ray Mabus announced his candidacy for the governorship of Mississippi, winning election on a reform platform. In 1988, the state government passed legislation requiring counties to institute central purchasing authorities and to hold referendums on whether to maintain the current supervisor system or replace it with a new manager system, with over half of the state's counties opting for the new system. Regarding the operation, historian James R. Crockett of the University of Southern Mississippi wrote, "Operation Pretense devastated lives, derailed political careers, and resulted in significant reforms in county government. However, those reforms were far from perfect or complete".

== Background ==
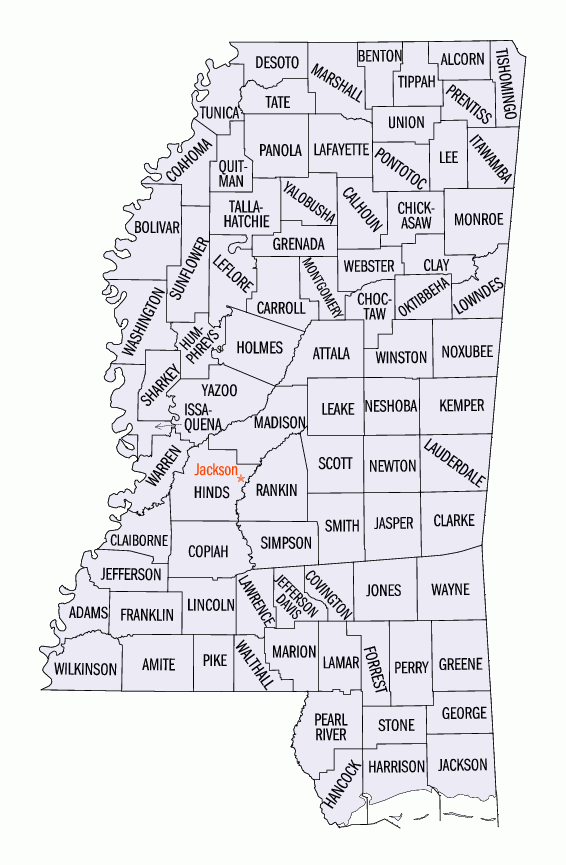
A map of Mississippi's 82 counties

In the early 1980s, the U.S. state of Mississippi was divided into 82 counties for local government. Per the laws of the state, each of these counties was further subdivided into five districts, which was widely known as the "beat system". Under the system, each district elected a supervisor who oversaw almost all county government functions, (Note: The only county government function that was not overseen by the supervisors was the operation of the public schools, which were overseen by a separately elected board of education in each school district.) including purchases regarding road construction and maintenance within their district. In routine matters, these supervisors were directly responsible for overseeing purchases, and counties were not legally required to maintain records on inventory or the assets being purchased. These conditions allowed some supervisors to abuse the system by accepting payoffs and kickbacks from vendors who, in some cases, provided no assets to the district. Additionally, with regards to nonroutine purchases that required a bidding process from vendors, supervisors could often influence the process for their benefit. Concerning the situation with the county districts, Mississippi historian Dennis J. Mitchell said that the system "[made] each supervisor ruler of his or her little fiefdom, where he or she ordered materials and paid for them without oversight".

While many within government at the local and state level were either suspicious of the system or fully aware of the abuses, no solid action was taken to prosecute those responsible. In the case of county attorneys and sheriffs, many did not want to prosecute supervisors who were in control of their departments' funding, while many district attorneys did not want to create political enemies out of the supervisors. Additionally, the attorney general of Mississippi lacked the power to subpoena. Concerning local voters, Mitchell states that many overlooked the corruption and in some cases even benefitted from it, as the supervisors, often considered "good ole boys" by some within their districts, sometimes used their political power to do things for their constituents like gravel private drives and excavate graves using county-owned backhoes. According to Mitchell, "Mississippians had grown accustomed to graft, and while they knew it to be illegal, they did not consider it to be wrong".

== Investigation ==
=== Initial investigation ===
The investigation traces its origins to 1982, when John Burgess, a Pentecostal minister and businessman from Carthage, Mississippi, invested in Polk Concrete, a pipe company based south of the state capital of Jackson, Mississippi. After investing in the company, Burgess discovered that salesmen who worked for the company were required to pay kickbacks to some supervisors in order to do business in their counties. Additionally, Burgess alleged that he had been involved in a shakedown by supervisors who required ten percent of all the money made by the company through its sales of pipes to the county. Burgess notified the federal government of the United States through the local office of the Federal Bureau of Investigation (FBI). The operation into investigating the supervisors officially commenced in March 1984, roughly two years after Burgess first notified the FBI.

The operation was spearheaded by Weldon L. Kennedy, a special agent of the FBI. Kennedy was the agent in charge in Jackson, who had become aware of the supervisor corruption issue in 1985 after talking to many sheriffs and chiefs of police in the state. Kennedy discussed the issue with United States Attorneys George Phillips of Jackson and John Hailman of Oxford, Mississippi. According to Hailman, Phillips told Kennedy about Burgess, and after meeting with Kennedy and Phillips, Burgess agreed to get involved in the FBI's statewide sting operation. Because of Burgess's profession as a preacher, the FBI codenamed their investigation "Operation Preacher's Ten Percent Supervisors' Expense", which was abbreviated as "Operation Pretense". (Note: This full name is given in both a Mississippi Encyclopedia article by historian James R. Crockett of the University of Mississippi and in a 2014 book by Mitchell. However, in a 2013 book, former United States Attorney John Hailman gives a slightly different full name of "The Preacher's 10 Percent".) As part of his cooperation, Burgess agreed to open a front organization for the bureau named the Mid-State Pipe Company. (Note: This name is given in several sources, including by both Crockett and Mitchell. However, Hailman gives a slightly different name of "Mid-State Pipe and Supply". Additionally, concerning the front, Hailman says that Burgess "agreed to allow his business near Jackson to be used as a front by the FBI". Crockett simply says that Burgess "opened an FBI front", while Mitchell says that Burgess "open[ed] a front for [the FBI] named Mid-State Pipe Company across from his building supply company in Carthage".) Burgess, posing as an employee of Mid-State, also secretly recorded conversations he had with multiple supervisors, including discussions of kickbacks that the two parties engaged in. In addition to Burgess, FBI special agents Cliff Chatham and Jerry King conducted multiple sting operations with supervisors while posing as salesmen for Mid-State. After some time working with the operation, Burgess "sold" the company to his salesmen, the undercover agents.

=== Prosecution ===
According to Hailman, under U.S. Attorney and FBI guidelines, the investigation could not target many of the suspected supervisors until predication had been obtained. Hailman stated that, after they caught one salesman on tape involved in corruption, they "hotboxed" him until he agreed to give predication on several dozen county supervisors who he had paid bribes to. The salesman also agreed to wear a wire and cooperate with the FBI's investigation in exchange for a lighter sentence. After predication was gained, Hailman says that the FBI faced an issue where they did not have enough funds to finance the kickbacks being asked by every supervisor they had planned on targeting. As a result, the FBI decided to only focus on supervisors who were asking for bribes of at least several hundred dollars. Additionally, the U.S. attorneys would only prosecute supervisors to whom at least three payoffs had been made, as the attorneys believed that criminal defense lawyers could portray a one-time payment as an isolated incident that the supervisor engaged in under pressure from the undercover agents. In several counties, such as George and Marshall, the evidence collected by the FBI against supervisors there proved inadequate to file charges.

At the state level, the federal government was assisted by Mississippi State Auditor Ray Mabus, who provided staff and helped collect documentation to prosecute the supervisors. Mabus had been elected state auditor in 1983 on an anti-corruption reform platform and, once in office, had visited each of the state's counties, warning supervisors that he would enforce state law regarding the use of public funds for private projects. While some supervisors bemoaned Mabus's actions, his efforts to crackdown on corruption is estimated to have saved the government millions of dollars in man-hour and gravel costs.

Within several months of the operation beginning, the federal agents had gathered enough evidence to issue indictments against about 50 supervisors in both the Northern and Southern District of Mississippi, with the first indictments being issued on February 13, 1987. The prosecutions were carried out by Hailman and James Tucker, attorneys from the Northern District and Southern District, respectively. According to Hailman, they decided to start by indicting only ten supervisors in each district, in order to keep the caseloads manageable. The first trial, that of Supervisor Trudie Westmoreland of Perry County, ended in a conviction. In the Northern District, the first few cases saw all five supervisors from Pontotoc County plead guilty.

=== Legal outcomes ===
In total, criminal charges were filed against 57 supervisors in 25 counties, (Note: Both Mitchell and Hailman agree that 57 supervisors were charged with a crime as a result of the FBI operation. However, in a 2006 journal article published in the Economics of Governance, the authors state that 55 supervisors were convicted, one was found not guilty in a criminal trial, one was found mentally unfit to stand trial, and another died following their indictment but before the disposition of their case. Additionally, the article states that the supervisors who were charged represented 26 of the state's counties.) constituting roughly one-eighth of all of Mississippi's supervisors. Of the accused, 55 were convicted on at least one felony count. Only seven supervisors had their cases go to trial, of which only one supervisor was found innocent. Additionally, one supervisor was found mentally incompetent to stand trial and another supervisor died after being indicted but before his case's disposition. In addition to the supervisors, the investigation resulted in charges and felony convictions against 13 vendors, two commissioners for the Mississippi State Highway Commission, and one county road foreman. Only one vendor contested the charges brought against him, and he was found guilty by the jury in his case.

Charges leveled against the accused included bribery, extortion, mail fraud, rigging bids, and paying out expenses for goods not received by contractors, among other things. Sentences handed to those found guilty included restitution, fines, and prison sentences up to ten years in length. Plea bargains substantially reduced the financial charges, lowering the average fine amount for a guilty supervisor from $527,259 to $4,463 and the average restitution amount from $2,252 to $1,532. During the indictments, several supervisors continued to engage in illegal activities, with one supervisor caught threatening to kill an undercover agent. Additionally, the brother of an indicted vendor was caught offering to engage in jury tampering if the case made it to trial.

== Aftermath ==
In total, the federal investigation lasted roughly three years, ending sometime in late 1987. The operation as a whole was part of a larger wave of anti-corruption sting operations conducted by the FBI in the aftermath of the Watergate scandal, occurring around the same time as another FBI investigation concerning the Oklahoma county commissioner scandal, a similar incident involving county-level government officials engaging in illegal financial activities. According to Hailman, Kennedy had planned to conduct a second sting operation following Operation Pretense that would have targeted members of the Mississippi Legislature. Hailman stated that the FBI would have set up a fake lobbying firm to accept bribe requests from some state politicians, and while the FBI had predication on several members of government, the federal government never approved of the plan, which Hailman said would have been comparable to the Abscam operation that targeted federal legislators.

Following the indictments, Mabus announced his candidacy for governor, winning election largely on a reform platform and buoyed by support from his work with the federal investigation. The following year, the state government passed legislation requiring counties to have central purchasing authorities and to hold referendums on whether they wanted to maintain their current supervisor system or institute a new unit system, whereby managers would be in charge of the county's expenses. However, Mabus's efforts to continue fighting supervisor corruption saw only limited success. Only 48 of Mississippi's counties, primarily urban ones, voted to adopt the new system, and two counties, Jones and Lincoln, later voted to go back to the beat system. In the cases of supervisors who had been found guilty and were removed from their office, some boards of supervisors appointed relatives of the convicted to their former posts. Speaking of the federal investigation in an article for the Mississippi Encyclopedia, historian James R. Crockett of the University of Southern Mississippi wrote, "Operation Pretense devastated lives, derailed political careers, and resulted in significant reforms in county government. However, those reforms were far from perfect or complete".

== Sources ==
- "James B. Tucker, Who Prosecuted Mississippi Corruption, Dies at 82". Jackson Free Press. Associated Press. December 30, 2021. Archived from the original on February 27, 2024.
- Crockett, James R. (April 14, 2018) [July 11, 2017]. "Operation Pretense". Mississippi Encyclopedia. Archived from the original on May 23, 2024.
- Hailman, John (2013). "Operation Pretense: We Become "Mississippi's Untouchables"". From Midnight to Guntown: True Crime Stories from a Federal Prosecutor in Mississippi. Jackson, Mississippi: University Press of Mississippi. pp. 119–121. ISBN 978-1-62846-876-2.
- Karahan, Gökhan R.; Razzolini, Laura; Shughart, William F. II (February 21, 2006). "No Pretense to Honesty: County Government Corruption in Mississippi" (PDF). Economics of Governance. 7. Springer Science+Business Media: 211–227. doi:10.1007/s10101-005-0006-4.
- Minor, Bill (September 9, 2015). "Looking back on Operation Pretense". DeSoto Times-Tribune. Archived from the original on July 6, 2018.
- Mitchell, Dennis J. (2014a). A New History of Mississippi. Jackson, Mississippi: University Press of Mississippi. ISBN 978-1-61703-976-8.
- Musgrove, George Derek (2012). Rumor, Repression, and Racial Politics: How the Harassment of Black Elected Officials Shaped Post-Civil Rights America. Athens, Georgia: University of Georgia Press. ISBN 978-0-8203-3459-2.
- Rosoff, Stephen M.; Pontell, Henry N.; Tillman, Robert H. (2003) [1998]. Looting America: Greed, Corruption, Villains, and Victims. Hoboken, New Jersey: Prentice Hall. ISBN 978-0-13-112142-3.
- Witt, Elder (1992). "Is Government Full of Crooks or Are We Just Better at Finding Them?". In Madsen, Peter; Shafritz, Jay M. (eds.). Essentials of Government Ethics: A Collection of Key Articles by Leading Social Thinkers, Including Sissela Bok, Mario Cuomo, Paul H. Douglas, Niccolò Machiavelli, Plato, David H. Rosenbloom. New York City: Meridian. pp. 343–351. ISBN 0-452-01091-8.
