= Statistics Austria =

Austria's principal government institution in charge of statistics and census data

Coordinates: 48.1853°N 16.4219°E

- Statistik Austria

Agency overview
- Website: www.statistik.at/en

Statistics Austria, known locally as Statistik Austria, is the official name of Austria's Federal Statistical Office (German: Bundesanstalt Statistik Österreich), the country's agency for collecting and publishing official statistics related to Austria.

In 2000 a bill (federal law for statistics) transformed the Österreichisches Statistisches Zentralamt (Austrian Statistical Central Office) into Statistik Austria.

Statistik Austria is an independent, not-profit-seeking institution with public rights, which has the duty to fulfill services of the Bundesstatistik (Federal Statistics); the GDI (Gender-related Development Index), for example, is calculated by Statistik Austria. The current directors general are Gabriela Petrovic, who handles administrative matters, and Tobias Thomas.

Although Statistik Austria was validated as Austria's institution for statistics research, the organization itself was already founded in 1829 with the name 'Statistical Bureau'. In 1840 it was renamed the Direktion der Administrativen Statistik, in 1863 again the K&K Statistische Zentralkommission; in the First Austrian Republic (German: Erste Republik Österreich) from 1921 to 1938 (German Invasion) it was named Bundesamt für Statistik, and after the Second World War, from 1945 to 1999 it bore the name Österreichisches Statistisches Zentralamt.
