= Sean Tindell =

American politician

Sean J. Tindell

Mississippi Public Safety Commissioner
- Incumbent
- Assumed office June 1, 2020

Judge of the Mississippi Court of Appeals
- In office October 16, 2017 – June 1, 2020
- Preceded by: David M. Ishee
- Succeeded by: Joel Smith

Member of the Mississippi State Senate from the 49th district
- In office January 3, 2012 – October 16, 2017
- Preceded by: Billy Hewes
- Succeeded by: Joel Carter

Personal details
- Born: Sean Jeffrey Tindell; October 5, 1973 (age 52) Gulfport, Mississippi, U.S.
- Party: Republican
- Education: University of Southern Mississippi (BBA, MBA); Mississippi College (JD)
- Occupation: Attorney

Sean Jeffrey Tindell (born October 5, 1973) is an American lawyer serving as Mississippi Public Safety Commissioner appointed by Governor Tate Reeves. He was formerly a judge on the Mississippi Court of Appeals and a member of the Mississippi State Senate representing District 49 on the Mississippi Gulf Coast, covering parts of Biloxi and Gulfport.

== Early life and education ==
Sean J. Tindell was born in Gulfport, Mississippi, in 1973 and has resided there his entire life. Tindell graduated from Gulfport High School in 1992 and then attended the University of Southern Mississippi in Hattiesburg. Tindell graduated from USM in 1996 with a Bachelor's degree and then in 1998 received his Master's degree in business administration. Tindell then attended Mississippi College School of Law in Jackson and earned his J.D. degree in 2001.

== Career ==
Tindell was an Assistant District Attorney from 2002 to 2007. In 2007 Sean Tindell ran for County Attorney in Harrison County and was defeated in a narrow race. In 2011, Tindell successfully sought to fill the seat of long time senator Billy Hewes, who was running for lieutenant governor.

Tindell is an attorney with the Tindell Law Firm, PLLC, located in Gulfport.
