= Eric Powell (politician) =

American politician

Member of the Mississippi Senate from the 4th district
- In office January 1, 2008 – January 3, 2012
- Preceded by: Travis Little
- Succeeded by: Rita Potts Parks

Personal details
- Born: June 6, 1966 (age 60) Red Bay, Alabama
- Party: Democratic
- Education: University of Mississippi

Eric Powell (born June 6, 1966) is an American politician from Mississippi. A Democrat, Powell was first elected to the Mississippi Senate in November 2007. He was defeated in 2011. He attended Northeast Community College, University of Mississippi and Wingate University.
