= Joel Bomgar =

American businessman and politician

Joel Bomgaar
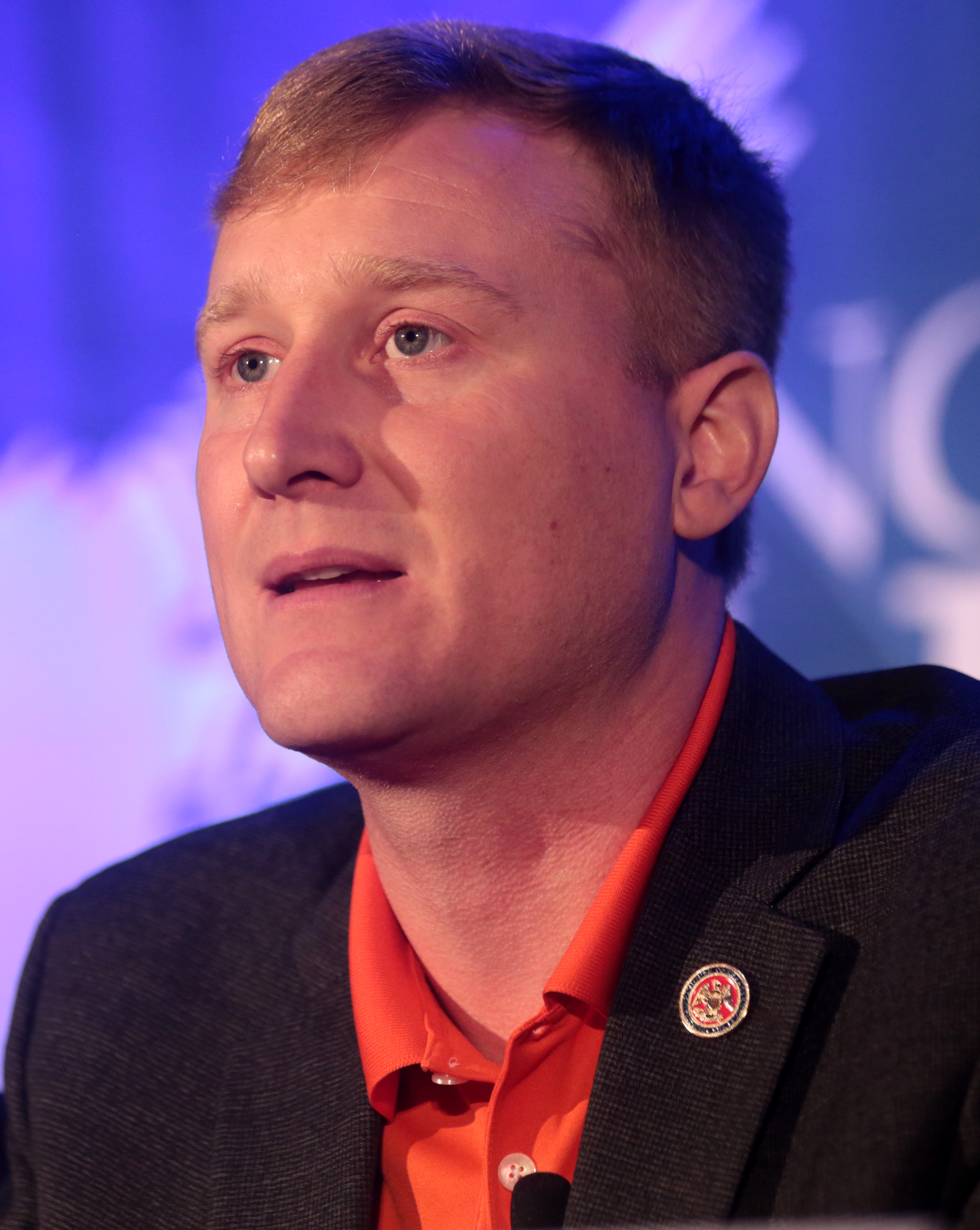
- Bomgar speaking with attendees at the 2018 Young Americans for Liberty National Convention

Member of the Mississippi House of Representatives from the 58th district
- In office January 5, 2016 – January 2, 2024
- Preceded by: Rita Martinson
- Succeeded by: Jonathan McMillan

Personal details
- Born: Joel Bomgaar; February 6, 1980 (age 46)
- Party: Republican
- Children: 4
- Education: Belhaven University
- Occupation: Politician, businessman

Joel Bomgaars (born February 6, 1980), known professionally as Joel Bomgar, is an American businessman and politician. He is the founder of Bomgar Corporation, a technology company. He served in the Mississippi House of Representatives, representing the 58th district from 2016 to 2024.

== Early life ==
Joel Bomgaars was born on February 6, 1980. He graduated from Belhaven University. He served in the Mississippi Air National Guard.

== Career ==
=== Business ===
In 2003, Joel Bomgar founded Bomgar Corporation, a company that provides software-based, remote tech-support solutions. Bomgar grew the company to provide services to clients in around 65 countries and had a revenue of around $50 million, as of 2014. Bomgar stepped down from CEO to chairman of the board after an equity firm purchased a majority stake in the company.

Bomgar served on the Steering Committee of the Mississippi Economic Council Blueprint Mississippi, the statewide long-range economic development plan. Additionally, he served on the Boards of Trustees of the Madison County Foundation and his alma mater, Belhaven University.

As of May 2022, he is the president of Próspera, a company that is developing a governance platform and semi-autonomous city of St. John's Bay on the Honduran island of Roatan.

=== Politics ===
Bomgar has served as a member of the Mississippi House of Representatives since January 2016. He represents the 58th district, which includes parts of Madison, Mississippi and Ridgeland, Mississippi.

In 2020, Bomgar voted yes on the bill to change the Mississippi State Flag.

== Personal life ==
Bomgar is married to Rachel Roberts. They reside in Madison, Mississippi.

Bomgar is of Presbyterian faith.
