= Angela Turner-Ford =

American politician

Member of the Mississippi State Senate from the 16th district
- Incumbent
- Assumed office January 23, 2013
- Preceded by: Bennie Turner

Personal details
- Born: July 2, 1971 (age 55) Columbus, Mississippi
- Party: Democratic
- Children: 3
- Education: Hampton University (BA); University of Mississippi School of Law (JD)

Angela Turner-Ford (born July 2, 1971) is an American politician who has served in the Mississippi State Senate from the 16th district since 2013.

She graduated from Hampton University and the University of Mississippi School of Law. She served as city prosecutor for West Point, Mississippi, and county prosecutor for Clay County, Mississippi. She was elected to the State Senate in a special election after the incumbent senator Bennie Turner, who was Turner-Ford's father, died.

Turner-Ford works as an attorney and as the board attorney for the Clay County Board of Supervisors; she is the first Black woman to be appointed by the board to the position.

== Early life and education ==
Turner-Ford was born on July 2, 1971, in Columbus, Mississippi. Her father was state senator Bennie Turner.

She attended Mississippi State University and Howard University before eventually graduating from Hampton University with a bachelor's degree in biology. She earned a certificate in medical technology from the University of Alabama at Birmingham. She graduated with a Juris Doctor in 2000 from the University of Mississippi School of Law. Upon graduation, she joined her father's law firm and works as an attorney.

== Career ==
She was appointed city prosecutor in 2006 for West Point, Mississippi. She was later appointed county prosecutor for Clay County, Mississippi. She served in both positions until 2013. She serves as the attorney for the Clay County Board of Supervisors, becoming the first Black woman appointed by the board for the position.

=== State senate ===
Following her father's death in November 2012, who was the incumbent senator for District 16 in the Mississippi State Senate, Turner-Ford ran for election to the seat. She ran against West Point businessman Kenny Fowler and squarely defeated him with over 70 percent of the vote in the January 2013 special election. She was re-elected in 2015, 2019, and 2023 unopposed in both the primary and general elections.

In the 2024-2028 term, she chairs the Drug Policy committee and vice-chairs the Executive Contingency Fund committee.

== Personal life ==
Turner-Ford is married with three children and is Methodist. She is a member of Delta Sigma Theta.
