= Jonathan McMillan =

American politician

Member of the Mississippi House of Representatives from the 58th district
- Incumbent
- Assumed office January 2, 2024
- Preceded by: Joel Bomgar

Personal details
- Born: August 25, 1978 (age 47) Kosciusko, Mississippi
- Party: Republican
- Occupation: Politician
- Profession: Aeuines Supply

Jonathan McMillan serves as a member of the Mississippi House of Representatives for the 58th District, affiliating with the Republican Party, a position he has held since 2024.
