= Harvey Fillingane =

American politician (born 1938)

Member of the Mississippi House of Representatives from the 101st district
- In office January 9, 2007 – January 3, 2012
- Preceded by: Joey Fillingane
- Succeeded by: Hank Lott

Personal details
- Born: December 11, 1938 (age 87) Lamar County, Mississippi, U.S.
- Party: Republican

Harvey Fillingane (born December 11, 1938) is an American Republican politician. From 2008 to 2012 he served as member of the Mississippi House of Representatives from the 101st District. He was first elected in 2007.
