= Wanda Jennings =

American politician

Wanda Taylor Jennings (born Feb. 9, 1946) is a politician in Mississippi who has served jn the Mississippi House of Representatives. A Republican, she served from 1998 to January 2015.

She won several elections and lost in 2015. She has lived in Southaven. She attended Memphis State University. She is married to Terry Jennings.

She has held political forums for candidates at her home.
