= Virtual help desk =

IT support tool

A virtual help desk allows IT support organizations to virtually deploy IT technicians on demand to support a computer user experiencing technical issues. IT can efficiently manage and allocate global help desk resources, including – most importantly – its personnel, to access any computer to provide support despite the end user or IT rep location. Virtual help desks allow IT reps to virtually access end systems through support sessions where they can diagnose and fix computer issues quickly. This eliminates in-person customer service calls and/or ineffective phone-only tech support sessions, making the help desk more efficient. Another objective of the virtual help desk is to improve IT resource management and save organization's money by increasing IT support efficiencies. Through an enhanced ability to allocate resources, IT organizations have the flexibility to create new ways of using its technical support knowledgebase. This technology usually requires a software implementation and support contract.

== Application/Techniques ==
Organizations can gain considerable infrastructure and cost savings by deploying virtualization technologies in hardware environments, such as data centers. However, the concept of virtualization can also be applied to the way people work. When applied to the help desk, this translates into the same number of technicians being able to handle more support incidents. As tech support problems are typically handled by the call center, contact center, or a help desk, either by telephone or remote desktop software, it’s important that technicians be able to work independently (or virtually) to quickly troubleshoot computer issues. The following points provide a quick overview of the benefits to an organization virtualizing its help desk:

1.Increased productivity: Companies can increase the number of support calls handled per day and cut the costs of lengthy service calls. Also, companies can eliminate the time and travel expense of technicians going on-site to resolve customer tech problems, improving IT resource management.

2.Efficient routing: As technology becomes more complex, a virtualized help desk provides the infrastructure to better manage decentralized IT operations and assign expert technicians across the queue to handle a particular tech support issue. This helps streamline the overall customer service process, while minimizing the time a support caller spends navigating through an automated phone tree.

3.Improved control: Putting a help desk rep in the driver's seat to troubleshoot computer issues can enhance the customer experience by lessening frustration, it can also reduce the stress IT staff face when walking non-tech savvy users through a tech support session. Ensuring that the help desk staff is happy when dealing with customers can help a company build and maintain customer relations, not to mention reducing IT staff turnover rates.

The virtual help desk resides between the systems management and service desk platforms to work with the systems that track when trouble tickets open and close, to provide an account of what happens during the support process. This level of granular support activity (e.g. the what, how, when, why and even whose mouse click is used) also helps organizations better manage its IT resources and optimize the help desk. Using a centralized, virtual help desk solution to capture important support details (e.g. record remote sessions, note where calls were transferred or how the issues were resolved) enables IT organizations to build an effective knowledge base. This increased level of understanding can be used in root cause analysis to minimize recurring help desk issues and begin to address the tech support issues that result in desktop incident resolution gap.

== Example ==
The growing number of remote workers has put increased pressure on IT networks, forcing administrators to spend an increasing amount of time trying to fix users’ problems instead of their regular IT work.

This is also true for software vendors who must be able to troubleshoot and assist customers who may have purchased their product. Unlike a corporate help desk, the options for computing devices and Internet connections are endless and remain virtually unknown to the support representative until they get contacted for service.

This increased demand requires IT support organizations to be more agile in diagnosing and resolving desktop issues, which correlates with how the overall service support processes are run. Organizations that are integrating virtual help desk technology to optimize the overall IT support process are gaining significant benefits.

The SSPA (Service & Support Professionals Association) conducts ongoing research to provide help desk organizations with the information to reach their support and service objectives. John Ragsdale, SSPA VP of Research, reports on key benchmark information from the SSPA Benchmark Database, as well as other member and industry surveys to point out trends and best practices in support technology.

== History ==
Several things are driving the development of the virtualized help desk. According to IDC, key market factors include the proliferation of remote workers in the enterprise, the expansion of the small and medium-sized business (SMB) and small office/home office (SOHO) market and its increasing dependence on IT, and the need for a cost-effective way to support the consumer market. As workforces become more dispersed – 83% of companies say they operate a virtual workplace, in which more than one-quarter of employees work away from their supervisors or workgroups – responding to IT issues can be complex and costly if travel is required.

Today’s economic instability is also putting added pressure on companies to find gainful ways of optimizing current operations to ensure and build their business. In fact, recent Nemertes research found that only 44% of companies are increasing their IT budgets in 2008; and only 28% plan to do so in 2009. This means that organizations across various industries will be looking for ways to optimize IT.

Persistent IT problems that prohibit a company’s productivity are another factor as money is lost from both sides of the balance sheet. This concern is amplified when talking about external support as the stakes are higher for companies to deliver swift, effective, and reliable IT support to its customers.
