= Giles Ward =

American politician

President pro tempore of the Mississippi State Senate
- In office January 6, 2015 – January 5, 2016
- Preceded by: Terry W. Brown
- Succeeded by: Terry C. Burton

Member of the Mississippi State Senate from the 18th district
- In office January 8, 2008 – January 5, 2016
- Preceded by: Gloria Williamson
- Succeeded by: Jenifer Branning

Personal details
- Born: March 6, 1948 (age 78) Winston Co., Mississippi, U.S.
- Party: Republican
- Spouse: Kay Burrage

Giles K. Ward (born March 6, 1948) is an American politician. A member of the Republican Party, he was elected to the Mississippi State Senate in 2007. In 2015, he was chosen unanimously to be the Senate's president pro tempore following the death of Terry W. Brown three months earlier.

Mississippi State Senate
Preceded by Terry W. Brown	President pro tempore of the Mississippi Senate; 2015–2016	Succeeded by Terry C. Burton
