= Dirk Dedeaux =

American politician

Member of the Mississippi House of Representatives from the 93rd district
- In office January 2, 1996 – January 3, 2012
- Succeeded by: Timmy Ladner

Personal details
- Born: Picayune, Mississippi
- Party: Democratic

Dirk Dedeaux is an American politician who served in the Mississippi House of Representatives from the 93rd district from 1996 to 2012.
