= J. Shaun Walley =

J. Shaun Walley is a teacher and former state legislator who served in the Mississippi House of Representatives. A Democrat, he attended Jones County Junior College and graduated from the University of Southern Mississippi.

He represented the 105th district from April 2005 when he won a special election. He did not run for reelection in 2011. During his service in the House, he sponsored several bills commending people for their service.
