= Vincent Davis =

American politician

Member of the Mississippi Senate from the 36th district
- In office 2008 - 2009
- Preceded by: Lynn Posey
- Succeeded by: Albert Butler

Personal details
- Born: June 28, 1963 (age 63) Prentiss, Mississippi
- Party: Democratic
- Education: Alcorn State University
- Occupation: attorney

E. Vincent Davis was a Democratic member of the Mississippi Senate, representing the 36th District during 2008 and 2009.

Davis was appointed Chancery Judge for the 17th Chancery Court District (Adams, Claiborne, Jefferson, and Wilkinson Counties) on December 7, 2009.
