= Terry W. Brown =

American politician

Terry Brown

President pro tempore of the Mississippi State Senate
- In office January 3, 2012 – September 4, 2014
- Preceded by: Billy Hewes
- Succeeded by: Giles Ward

Member of the Mississippi State Senate from the 17th district
- In office January 6, 2004 – September 4, 2014
- Preceded by: Bill Canon
- Succeeded by: Charles Younger

Member of the Mississippi House of Representatives from the 40th district
- In office January 5, 1988 – January 4, 2000
- Succeeded by: Gary Chism

Personal details
- Born: Terry Wayne Brown; March 14, 1950 Columbus, Mississippi, U.S.
- Died: September 4, 2014 (aged 64) Columbus, Mississippi, U.S.
- Party: Democratic (until 1989); Republican (1989–2014)
- Spouse: Andra Dobbel

Terry Wayne Brown (March 14, 1950 – September 4, 2014) was a Republican politician from the U.S. state of Mississippi, who served in the Mississippi Senate, representing the 17th district, and as the Senate President pro tempore.

A native of Columbus, Mississippi, Brown played football for East Mississippi Junior College. He died of cancer at the age of sixty-four. He is interred at Pleasant Hill Cemetery in Lowndes County, Mississippi. He was married to Andra, with whom he had three sons.
