= Tracy Arinder =

American politician

Tracy Arinder (born July 19, 1951) is a former state legislator in Mississippi. A Democrat, he represented the 75th district in the Mississippi House of Representatives from 2004 to 2012. He owned a trucking company, poultry, and cattle.

He was succeeded by Tom Miles for the 75th district.
