= BeyondTrust =

American software company

- Type: Private
- Industry: Enterprise Security; Identity Management and Access Control, Vulnerability Management, Compliance Reporting
- Founded: 1985
- Headquarters: Atlanta, Georgia, USA
- Key people: Matt Dircks, Executive Chairman; Janine Seebeck, CEO; Chris Jones, Chief Revenue Officer; Morey Haber, Chief Technology Officer; Dan Derosa, Chief Product Officer; Dave Giles, Chief Customer Success Officer; Liz Shulof, Chief Marketing Officer
- Products: Privilege and Identity Management; Vulnerability Management; Secure Remote Access
- Owner: Privately held
- Number of employees: ~ 1500
- Website: www.beyondtrust.com

BeyondTrust Corporation (formerly Bomgar and earlier NetworkStreaming and ExpertVNC) is an American company that develops privileged access management (PAM) and vulnerability management software.

Bomgar was renamed to its current name when it acquired BeyondTrust in 2018, a company originally founded in 1985 as Symark. Symark was renamed to BeyondTrust when it acquired that company in 2009.

== History ==
=== Symark ===
Symark was founded in 1985 as a VAX/VMS utility software company in Los Angeles' San Fernando Valley. Its name is derived from the initials of its founders, Bob Sommers and Doug Yarrow. Symark was also a client-server computing vendor, before later acquiring a license for the UNIX security product UPM (now owned by Quest Software) and rebranding their version PowerBroker. Symark relocated to Westlake Village, California, then again to Agoura Hills.

The company was focused on identity, access, and password management for privileged users on UNIX systems. From 2003—2008 the company expanded in Spain, Portugal, Japan and Latin America. During the same time period, they also grew by almost 300 percent and were one of the fastest growing private companies in the Los Angeles area.

Acquisitions
Company	Date	Price	Ref
BeyondTrust	2009	20 million USD	
Likewise Software	2011	Unknown	
eEye Digital Security	May 2012	Unknown	
Blackbird Group	December 2012	Unknown	

In September 2014, the private equity firm Veritas Capital acquired BeyondTrust for $310 million.

=== The original BeyondTrust ===
In 2003, AutoProf introduced the AutoProf Policy maker, which was the first commercial product to build upon Microsoft's built-in Group Policy Objects to make common tasks like mapping network drives or sharing printer connections easier. In 2005, AutoProf grew 90% in revenue over the previous year and changed the company name to DesktopStandard. Four million desktops were under the management of DesktopStandard's software across 3,500 customers. From 2003 to 2005, DesktopStandard added six products to their portfolio for role-based access control (RBAC), password management, and identity access management on Windows. In 2006, Microsoft acquired most of DesktopStandard's products, and DesktopStandard's CEO formed a new company (BeyondTrust) around the remaining Policy Maker Application Security product.

=== Bomgar ===
Bomgar
- Genre: Remote administration
- Founded: 2003
- Defunct: 2018
- Fate: Renamed to BeyondTrust Corporation
- Headquarters: United States
- Website: bomgar.com at the Wayback Machine (archived 2017-11-02)

Bomgar Corporation was a remote support provider that allows support technicians to remotely connect to end-user systems through firewalls from their computer or mobile device. Using the Bomgar Representative Console, technology support professionals can access and control systems and devices remotely, including personal computers, smartphones, tablets, servers, switches, point-of-sale systems and others.

The company originated when Joel Bomgaars developed his own remote support solutions to cut back on wasted hours he spent travelling while working as a support professional for a local company. In June 2003, he set up a one-page, static website selling his own, home-grown remote access solution, calling it ExpertVNC. Soon thereafter, his two college friends, Nathan McNeill and Patrick Norman, joined Bomgar as co-founders.

In May 2004, ExpertVNC changed its name to NetworkStreaming. In the next month it changed its cloud-based product to an appliance model, differentiating itself from other similar remote support solutions.

In February 2007, NetworkStreaming changes its company name to Bomgar, a simplified form of Joel Bomgaars' family name that he also chose to use professionally for himself.

Bomgar's first private equity investors, TA Associates, placed a majority investment in Bomgar in May 2014.

In April 2018, Francisco Partners announced that it acquired Bomgar from Thoma Bravo, which owned Bomgar since June 2016. Financial details of this deal were not disclosed.

Bomgar now operates under the name BeyondTrust.

=== Treasury Department hacking incident ===
It was reported on December 30, 2024 that BeyondTrust was implicated in a hacking incident against the U.S. Treasury Department by state-sponsored Chinese hackers. According to the report, the hackers stole an API key for a remote support SaaS application from BeyondTrust and used it to compromise U.S. Treasury workstations, viewing unclassified documents in what was described as a "major incident".

== See also ==
- Remote desktop software
- Comparison of remote desktop software
- Virtual help desk
- Criticism of Facebook § Rewards for vulnerability reporting
