= Terry C. Burton =

American politician (born 1956)

Terry Burton

President pro tempore of the Mississippi Senate
- In office January 5, 2016 – January 11, 2019
- Preceded by: Giles Ward
- Succeeded by: Gray Tollison

Member of the Mississippi Senate from the 31st district
- In office January 7, 1992 – January 7, 2020
- Preceded by: Alan Heflin
- Succeeded by: Tyler McCaughn

Personal details
- Born: Terry Clark Burton; January 31, 1956 (age 70) Philadelphia, Mississippi, U.S.
- Party: Democratic (1988–2002); Republican (2002–present)
- Spouse: Darleen Allday

Terry Clark Burton (born January 31, 1956) is an American politician. He is a Republican and former Senator, representing District 31. He also served as President Pro Tempore. He was arrested for drunk driving and did not file for reelection to the Senate.

== Early life ==
Terry Clark Burton was born on January 31, 1956, in Philadelphia, Mississippi.

== Career ==
Burton serves as a Republican member of the Mississippi State Senate, representing District 31, which includes parts of Lauderdale County, Newton County, Scott County, Mississippi. Since January 2016, he has also served as President Pro Tempore of the Mississippi Senate. In February 2015, he proposed a bill to lower the concealed carry fees in Mississippi from $100 to $80.

Burton is a York Rite Mason and a Shriner.

On December 19, 2018, Burton was arrested for suspicion of driving under the influence for the third time in less than 5 years. He stated he would remain as the Mississippi State Senate President Pro Tempore. However, he resigned from his role and stated he would retire at the end of the year.

== Personal life ==
Burton is married to Darleen Allday, with whom he has two children. They reside in Newton, Mississippi. He is a member of the United Methodist Church.

Mississippi State Senate
Preceded by Giles Ward	President pro tempore of the Mississippi Senate; 2016–2019	Succeeded by Gray Tollison
