= Billy Broomfield =

American politician

Mayor of Moss Point, Mississippi
- In office July 2013 – July 2017
- Preceded by: Aneice Liddell
- Succeeded by: Mario King

Member of the Mississippi House of Representatives from the 110th district
- In office 1992–2013
- Succeeded by: Jeramey Anderson

Personal details
- Born: January 15, 1945 (age 81) Moss Point, Mississippi
- Party: Democratic
- Other political affiliations: Independent

Billy Broomfield (born January 15, 1945) is an American politician. He was a member of the Mississippi House of Representatives from the 110th District, from 1992 to 2013. He is a member of the Democratic Party. He was elected mayor of Moss Point, Mississippi in 2013. Running as an independent, he lost reelection to Democrat Mario King in 2017.
