= Max Planck Institute for Tax Law and Public Finance =

Interdisciplinary research center in Munich, Germany

Coordinates: 48°08′28″N 11°34′52″E

The Max Planck Institute for Tax Law and Public Finance is an interdisciplinary research center in Munich. The Institute is part of the Max Planck Society, Germany’s foremost provider of basic research in science and humanities, funded largely from public resources.

== History ==
The Senate of the Max Planck Society has founded the Max Planck Institute for Tax Law and Public Finance in Munich as of 1 January 2011. It consists of the Department of Public Economics, headed by Kai A. Konrad, and the Department of Business and Tax Law, headed by Wolfgang Schön.

The Institute was founded by spinning-off the tax departments of the former Max Planck Institute for Intellectual Property, Competition and Tax Law, which was located at the same place. Together with the Max Planck Institute for Intellectual Property and Competition Law and the Max Planck Institute for Foreign and International Social Law, the Institute founded the Munich Max Planck Campus for Legal and Economic Research.

About 50 lawyers and economists, from Germany and abroad, work at the Institute. They do basic research on taxation but also in associated fields of research. The Institute’s work breeds scientific journals, articles and monographs, the Institute is involved in academic conferences, lectures and cooperation with other academic institutions and it also publishes comments on matters of fiscal policy and advises legislatures on the national as well as on the international level. The Institute’s mission is not limited to producing internationally visible research output in the respective disciplines but it also encompasses the advancement of interdisciplinary exchange. The Institute hosts visiting scholars and visiting researchers from all over the world and supports the research of PhD-students and post-docs by granting generous scholarships.

== Max Planck Law ==
The institute is part of the research network Max Planck Law.

== Notable people ==
- Birke Häcker, senior research fellow (2011–2016)
- Kai A. Konrad, Director since January 2011
