= Rita Martinson =

American politician (born 1937)

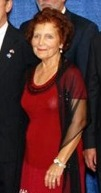

Member of the Mississippi House of Representatives from the 58th district
- In office 1992 – January 5, 2016
- Succeeded by: Joel Bomgar

Personal details
- Born: September 11, 1937 (age 88) Gloster, Mississippi, United States
- Party: Republican

Rita Martinson (born September 11, 1937) is an American politician. She served as a member of the Mississippi House of Representatives from the 58th District from 1992 to 2016. She is a member of the Republican party. She decided not to seek reelection in 2015.
