= Sherra Lane =

American attorney and politician

Member of the Mississippi House of Representatives from the 86th district
- In office January 3, 2005 – 2016

Personal details
- Born: October 27, 1944 (age 81) Waynesboro, Mississippi, United States
- Profession: Attorney

Sherra Hillman Lane (born October 27, 1944) is an American attorney and Democratic politician. She served as a member of the Mississippi House of Representatives from the 86th District, being first elected in 2004 and serving until 2016.
