= Joey Fillingane =

American politician (born 1973)

Member of the Mississippi State Senate from the 41st district
- Incumbent
- Assumed office January 2, 2007
- Preceded by: Billy Harvey

Member of the Mississippi House of Representatives from the 101st district
- In office January 4, 2000 – December 6, 2006
- Preceded by: Gene Saucier
- Succeeded by: Harvey Fillingane

Personal details
- Born: Joseph Edgar Fillingane; January 10, 1973 (age 53) Hattiesburg, Mississippi, U.S.
- Party: Republican
- Education: University of Southern Mississippi (BS); Mississippi College (JD)

Joseph Edgar Fillingane (born January 10, 1973) is an American politician who has served in the Mississippi State Senate from the 41st district since 2006. He previously served in the Mississippi House of Representatives from the 101st district from 2000 to 2006.
