= Alice Harden =

American politician

Member of the Mississippi Senate from the 28th district
- In office January 5, 1988 – January 3, 2012
- Preceded by: Henry J. Kirksey
- Succeeded by: Sollie Norwood

Personal details
- Born: April 17, 1948 Pike County, Mississippi
- Died: December 6, 2012 (aged 64)
- Party: Democratic
- Education: Jackson State University

Alice Varnado Harden (April 17, 1948 – December 6, 2012) was a Democratic member of the Mississippi Senate, representing the 28th District from 1988 until her death. She lived in Jackson and represented Hinds County.

== Biography ==
Senator Harden was born April 17, 1948, in Pike County. She graduated from Jackson State University with a Bachelor of Science and Master of Science. She worked as a classroom teacher and was a member of the Mississippi Association of Educators.

She was a member of Alpha Kappa Alpha, National Council of Negro Women, The League of Women Voters, and the NAACP. She represented Mississippi on the Education Commission of the States.

Harden was Baptist and married. She died on December 6, 2012.
