= Bennie Turner =

American broadcaster, lawyer, and legislator

Member of the Mississippi Senate from the 16th district
- In office January 5, 1993 – November 27, 2012
- Preceded by: District Created
- Succeeded by: Angela Turner-Ford

Personal details
- Born: August 21, 1948 West Point, Mississippi
- Died: November 27, 2012 (aged 64)
- Education: Mary Holmes College (AA); Mississippi State University (BA); University of Mississippi School of Law (JD)

Bennie Turner (August 21, 1948 – November 27, 2012) was an American broadcaster, lawyer, and legislator.

Born in West Point, Mississippi, Turner went to Mary Holmes College, Mississippi State University, and University of Mississippi School of Law, where he got his Juris Doctor degree. He served in the Mississippi State Senate as a Democrat from 1992 until his death. He died in Jackson, Mississippi.
