= Economics of Governance =

- Discipline: Economics
- Language: English
- Edited by: A. Glazer, M. Polborn

Publication details
- History: 2000-present
- Publisher: Springer Science+Business Media
- Frequency: Quarterly
- Impact factor: 0.364 (2013)

Standard abbreviations
- ISO 4: Econ. Gov.

Indexing
- ISSN: 1435-6104 (print); 1435-8131 (web)
- OCLC no.: 43769645

Links
- Journal homepage; Online archive

Economics of Governance is a peer-reviewed academic journal of economics published by Springer Science+Business Media covering governance in a large variety of organizations such as governments, corporations, and non-profit associations. The editors-in-chief are Amihai Glazer (University of California, Irvine) and Mattias Polborn (University of Illinois at Urbana–Champaign). The journal has been ranked fourth out of 31 journals in the field of public economics, and 125th out of 1017 journals in economics by impact by RePEc. According to the Journal Citation Reports, the journal has a 2013 impact factor of 0.364.
