= Travis Little =

American politician

Member of the Mississippi State Senate from the 4th district
- Member
- In office January 7, 1992 – January 1, 2008
- Preceded by: Irb Benjamin
- Succeeded by: Eric Powell

Personal details
- Born: November 24, 1942 (age 83) Corinth, Mississippi
- Party: Republican; Democratic

Travis Lane Little (born November 24, 1942) is a former state legislator in Mississippi.

He was born in Corinth, Mississippi. Little served in the Mississippi Senate as a Democrat from Corinth from 1992 to 2007. He held the District 4 seat. Little was also President Pro Tempore of the Mississippi Senate and chaired the body's Rules Committee. He later changed party affiliations and joined the Republican Party.
