= 2025 Mississippi State Senate special election =

- April 15 – December 2, 2025

12 of 52 seats in the Mississippi State Senate (9 court-ordered, 3 due to vacancies) 27 seats needed for a majority
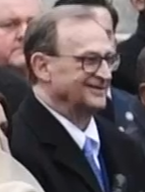

	Majority party	Minority party
Leader	Dean Kirby	Derrick Simmons
Party	Republican	Democratic
Leader since	January 7, 2020	July 31, 2017
Leader's seat	30th district	12th district
Last election	36	16
Seats before	36	14 (Note: Two vacant seats previously held by Democrats)
Seats won	5	4
Seats after	34	18
Seat change	▼2	▲2
- Map of the incumbents: Republican hold Democratic gain Democratic hold No election
President pro tempore before election
Dean Kirby
Republican
Elected President pro tempore
Dean Kirby
Republican

The 2025 Mississippi State Senate special election was held on November 4, 2025, to elect 9 of 52 members of the Mississippi State Senate. Special elections were called in 9 districts due to court-ordered redistricting, in addition a special election was held on April 15 to fill a vacancy in one district. Primary elections were held on August 5 and, where needed, runoff elections were held on December 2.

Democrats flipped two seats, breaking the Republican supermajority.

== Background ==
The election was called after court-ordered redistricting caused the state Senate map to be redrawn, as it was found to diminish the voting power of the state's African American population. The new map creates two new majority black districts, one each in DeSoto and Forrest County, both without incumbents. It then goes to court for approval, despite objections from lawmakers in DeSoto County and some Democrats, where it will await a ruling on the next day. In the first week of May, a panel of three judges approved the redrawn map from the Mississippi Election Commission and allowed 10 out of 15 districts to proceed with the special election.

== Retirements ==
=== Republicans ===
1. District 2: David Parker is retiring.
2. District 44: John Polk is retiring.

== Summary ==
=== April 15 special election ===
District	Incumbent			Result	Candidates
District	Member	Party	First elected	Result	Candidates
18	Jenifer Branning	Republican	2015	Incumbent resigned January 6, 2025, to join the Mississippi Supreme Court. New member elected April 15, 2025. Republican hold.	▌ ✓ Lane Taylor (Nonpartisan) 56.9%; ▌Mark Forsman (Nonpartisan) 26.1%; ▌Lindsey Kidd (Nonpartisan) 10.9%; ▌Ike Melton (Nonpartisan) 3.9%; ▌Marty Sistrunk (Nonpartisan) 2.1%

=== November 4 special elections ===
District	Incumbent			Result	Candidates
District	Member	Party	First elected	Result	Candidates
24	David Lee Jordan	Democratic	1993	Incumbent resigned June 30, 2025, to spend time with his family. New member elected December 2, 2025, after no one received over 50% of the vote on November 4, 2025. Democratic hold.	▌ ✓ Justin Pope (Nonpartisan) 54.0%; ▌Curressia Brown (Nonpartisan) 46.0%
26	John Horhn	Democratic	1992	Incumbent resigned June 30, 2025 to become the Mayor of Jackson. New member elected December 2, 2025, after no one received over 50% of the vote on November 4, 2025. Democratic hold.	▌ ✓ Kamesha Mumford (Nonpartisan) 55.9%; ▌Letitia Johnson (Nonpartisan) 44.1%

=== November 4 redistricting elections ===
District	Incumbent				Candidates	Result
District	Member	Party	First elected	Running	Candidates	Result
1	Michael McLendon	Republican	2019	Yes	▌ ✓ Michael McLendon (Republican) 71.9%; ▌Chris Hannah (Democratic) 28.1%	Republican hold.
1	Reginald Jackson (redistricted from SD 11)	Democratic	2023	Running in the 11th district	▌ ✓ Michael McLendon (Republican) 71.9%; ▌Chris Hannah (Democratic) 28.1%	Republican hold.
2	David Parker†	Republican	2012	No	▌ ✓ Theresa Gillespie Isom (Democratic) 62.6%; ▌Charlie Hoots (Republican) 37.4%	Democratic gain.
11	Reginald Jackson	Democratic	2023	Yes	▌ ✓ Reginald Jackson (Democratic) 66.9%; ▌Kendall Prewett (Republican) 33.1%	Democratic hold.
19	Kevin Blackwell	Republican	2015	Yes	▌ ✓ Kevin Blackwell (Republican) 53.3%; ▌Dianne Black (Democratic) 46.7%	Republican hold.
34	Juan Barnett	Democratic	2015	Yes	▌ ✓ Juan Barnett (Democratic)	Democratic hold.
41	Joey Fillingane	Republican	2006	Yes	▌ ✓ Joey Fillingane (Republican)	Republican hold.
42	Robin Robinson	Republican	2023	Lost renomination	▌ ✓ Don Hartness (Republican)	Republican hold.
44	John A. Polk†	Republican	2011	No	▌ ✓ Chris Johnson (Republican) 67.9%; ▌Shakita Taylor (Democratic) 32.1%	Republican hold.
44	Chris Johnson (redistricted from SD 45)	Republican	2019	Yes	▌ ✓ Chris Johnson (Republican) 67.9%; ▌Shakita Taylor (Democratic) 32.1%	Republican hold.
45	None (new district)				▌ ✓ Johnny DuPree (Democratic) 71.3%; ▌Anna Rush (Republican) 28.7%	Democratic gain.

== See also ==
- 2025 United States state legislative elections
