= The Last King of Scotland (film) =

2006 historical drama film

- British theatrical release poster
- Directed by: Kevin Macdonald
- Screenplay by: Jeremy Brock; Peter Morgan
- Based on: The Last King of Scotland by Giles Foden
- Produced by: Charles Steel; Lisa Bryer; Andrea Calderwood
- Starring: Forest Whitaker; James McAvoy; Kerry Washington; Simon McBurney; Gillian Anderson
- Cinematography: Anthony Dod Mantle
- Edited by: Justine Wright
- Music by: Alex Heffes
- Production companies: DNA Films; FilmFour; UK Film Council; Scottish Screen; TATfilm Produktion
- Distributed by: Fox Searchlight Pictures
- Release dates: 1 September 2006 (Telluride); 27 September 2006 (limited); 12 January 2007 (United Kingdom); 19 January 2007 (wide); 15 March 2007 (Germany)
- Running time: 123 minutes
- Countries: United Kingdom; United States; Germany
- Languages: English; Swahili
- Budget: $6 million
- Box office: $48.4 million

The Last King of Scotland is a 2006 historical drama film directed by Kevin Macdonald from a screenplay by Peter Morgan and Jeremy Brock. Based on Giles Foden's 1998 novel, its plot depicts the dictatorship of Ugandan President Idi Amin through the perspective of Nicholas Garrigan, a fictional Scottish doctor. The film stars Forest Whitaker, James McAvoy, Kerry Washington, Simon McBurney, and Gillian Anderson. The title of the film refers to Amin's spurious claim of being the King of Scotland.

The Last King of Scotland had its world premiere at the Telluride Film Festival on 1 September 2006, and was released in the United Kingdom on 12 January 2007, and in Germany on 15 March 2007, by Fox Searchlight Pictures. The film received positive reviews and grossed $48.4 million on a $6 million budget. For his performance as Idi Amin, Forest Whitaker won the Academy Award for Best Actor, among other accolades.

== Plot ==
In 1970, Nicholas Garrigan graduates from the University of Edinburgh Medical School. With dull prospects at home, he decides to seek adventure abroad by working at a missionary clinic in Uganda run by David Merrit and his wife, Sarah. After Garrigan arrives in Uganda, General Idi Amin overthrows President Milton Obote in a coup d'état. Amin gives a well-received speech, but Sarah is pessimistic. Garrigan is called to a car accident involving Amin and treats Amin's hand. During the incident, Garrigan takes a gun and shoots a mortally wounded cow when no-one else is willing to perform euthanasia. Initially hostile to Garrigan, Amin warms up to him after discovering he is Scottish due to his xenophilia for the Scots. Delighted by Garrigan's initiative, Amin exchanges clothing with him and subsequently invites Garrigan to serve as his personal physician and lead efforts to modernise the Ugandan healthcare system.

Despite being dismayed by acts of government repression, Garrigan accepts Amin's explanation that cracking down on political opposition will bring lasting peace to Uganda. Garrigan eventually learns that Amin has ostracized the youngest of his three wives, Kay, because she has given birth to an epileptic son, Mackenzie. When treating Mackenzie, Garrigan and Kay start to form a relationship. While working for Amin, Garrigan becomes a trusted confidant and is entrusted with a wider range of duties, including matters of state. Garrigan was gifted a car by Amin and while joyriding together, Amin's limousine is attacked by Obote loyalists, unaware that Amin was not in the limo. Garrigan and Amin soon discover that Jonah Wasswa, the Minister of Health, played a role in the attempt on Amin's life. Eventually, Garrigan becomes disillusioned by Amin as he witnesses increasing amounts of paranoia, murders and xenophobia. He attempts to announce his intention to return home, but is rebuffed by Amin. While at a party, after doing his best to evade a go-go dancer who is assigned to become his lover, he and Kay have sex; and she says he must find a way to leave Uganda. Amin secretly replaces Garrigan's British passport with a Ugandan one to prevent him from escaping, which leads Garrigan to seek help from Stone, the local Foreign Office representative. Stone warns Garrigan of Amin's war crimes and genocidal acts, during which he discovered that Wasswa was not only among the victims but sought to save Uganda. Garrigan is told by Stone he will be secretly transported out of Uganda if he assassinates Amin, which Garrigan refuses.

In 1972, Amin orders the expulsion of Asians from Uganda over Garrigan's protests. This creates a labor shortage that tanks Uganda's economy. Kay informs Garrigan that she has become pregnant with his child. Aware that Amin will murder her for infidelity if he discovers this, she begs Garrigan for a secret abortion. Delayed by Amin's command that he attend a press conference with Western journalists, Garrigan fails to meet Kay at the appointed time. Kay concludes she has been abandoned and seeks out a primitive abortion in a nearby village, where she is apprehended by Amin's forces. Garrigan finds her dismembered corpse on an autopsy table. Distraught, he decides to kill Amin. A hijacked aircraft is flown to Entebbe Airport by pro-Palestinian hijackers seeking asylum. Amin, sensing a major publicity opportunity, rushes to the scene, taking Garrigan along. At the airport, Masanga, Amin's chief of police, discovers Garrigan's plot to poison Amin under the ruse of giving him pills for a headache. Garrigan is beaten by Amin's henchmen before Amin arrives and discloses he is aware of the relationship with Kay. As punishment, Garrigan's chest is pierced with meat hooks before he is hanged by his skin.

Amin arranges a plane for the release of non-Israeli passengers, and the torturers leave Garrigan unconscious on the floor while they relax in another room. Garrigan's medical colleague, Dr. Junju, takes advantage of the opportunity to rescue him. He urges Garrigan to tell the world the truth about Amin's regime, asserting that the world will believe Garrigan because he is white. Junju gives Garrigan his own jacket, enabling him to mingle unnoticed with the crowd of freed hostages and board the plane to fly out of Uganda. When the torturers discover Garrigan's absence, Masanga captures Junju and kills him for aiding Garrigan in the escape. The Entebbe incident irreparably ruins Amin's reputation in the international community, and in 1979 he decides to invade Tanzania, which counterattacks and captures Kampala, overthrowing him. He lives the rest of his life in exile in Saudi Arabia until his death in 2003.

== Cast ==
- Forest Whitaker as Idi Amin
- James McAvoy as Dr. Nicholas Garrigan
- Kerry Washington as Kay Amin
- Gillian Anderson as Sarah Merrit
- Simon McBurney as Stone
- David Oyelowo as Dr. Junju
- Stephen Rwangyezi as Jonah Wasswa (Based on Henry Kyemba)
- Abby Mukiibi Nkaaga as Masanga
- Adam Kotz as David Merrit
- David Ashton as Garrigan Sr.
- Barbara Rafferty as Mrs. Garrigan
- Sam Okelo as Bonny
- Sarah Nagayi as Tolu
- Chris Wilson as Perkins
- Apollo Okwenje Omamo as Mackenzie Amin
- Louis Asea as Campbell Amin
- Joanitta Bewulira-Wandera as Malyamu Amin
- Consodyne Buzabo as Nora Amin
- Shabir Mir as Zumba
- Cleopatra Koheirwe as Joy
- Michael Wawuyo as Andrew Mukooza
- Martina Amati as Italian Journalist
- Angela Kalule as Nightclub singer

== Historical accuracy ==
While the character of Idi Amin and some of the events surrounding him in the film are mostly based on fact, Garrigan is a fictional character. Foden has acknowledged that one real-life figure who contributed to the character Garrigan was English-born Bob Astles, who worked with Amin. Another real-life figure who has been mentioned in connection with Garrigan is Scottish doctor Wilson Carswell. Like the novel on which it is based, the film mixes fiction with real events to give an impression of Amin and Uganda under his rule. While the basic arc of Amin's rule is followed, the events in the film depart from both actual history and the plot and characters in Foden's novel.

In real life, and in the book, Kay Amin was impregnated by her lover, a Ugandan physician (given a different name in the book from in real life). She died during a botched abortion performed by him, and he subsequently died by suicide. Astles said in a lengthy interview for The Times with the journalist Paul Vallely that her body was dismembered by her lover so it could be hidden and was then sewn back together on Amin's orders. Amin never had a son named Campbell.

Contrary to the wording of the film's coda stating "48 hours later, Israeli Forces stormed Entebbe and liberated all but one of the hostages", three hostages died during Operation Entebbe. The body of a fourth hostage, 75-year-old Dora Bloch, killed by Uganda Army officers at a nearby hospital in retaliation for Israel's actions, was eventually returned to Israel. The murder of Dora Bloch is depicted accurately in the book but not mentioned at all in the film. Also, when the non-Israeli hostages were released, they are seen being flown out of Entebbe, Uganda to Paris, France on an Antonov An-12 aircraft, but in real life the non-Israeli hostages were flown to Paris on a chartered Air France Boeing 747.

According to Foden the film's depiction of Amin is comparable with the Shakespearean character Macbeth, whom he had in mind when writing the novel.

== Release ==
The Last King of Scotland received a limited release in the United States on 27 September 2006, a UK release on 12 January 2007, a French release on 14 February 2007, and a German release on 15 March 2007. In the United States and Canada, the film earned $17,606,684 at the box office. In the United Kingdom, the film took $11,131,918. Its combined worldwide gross was $48,362,207.

== Reception ==
=== Critical response ===
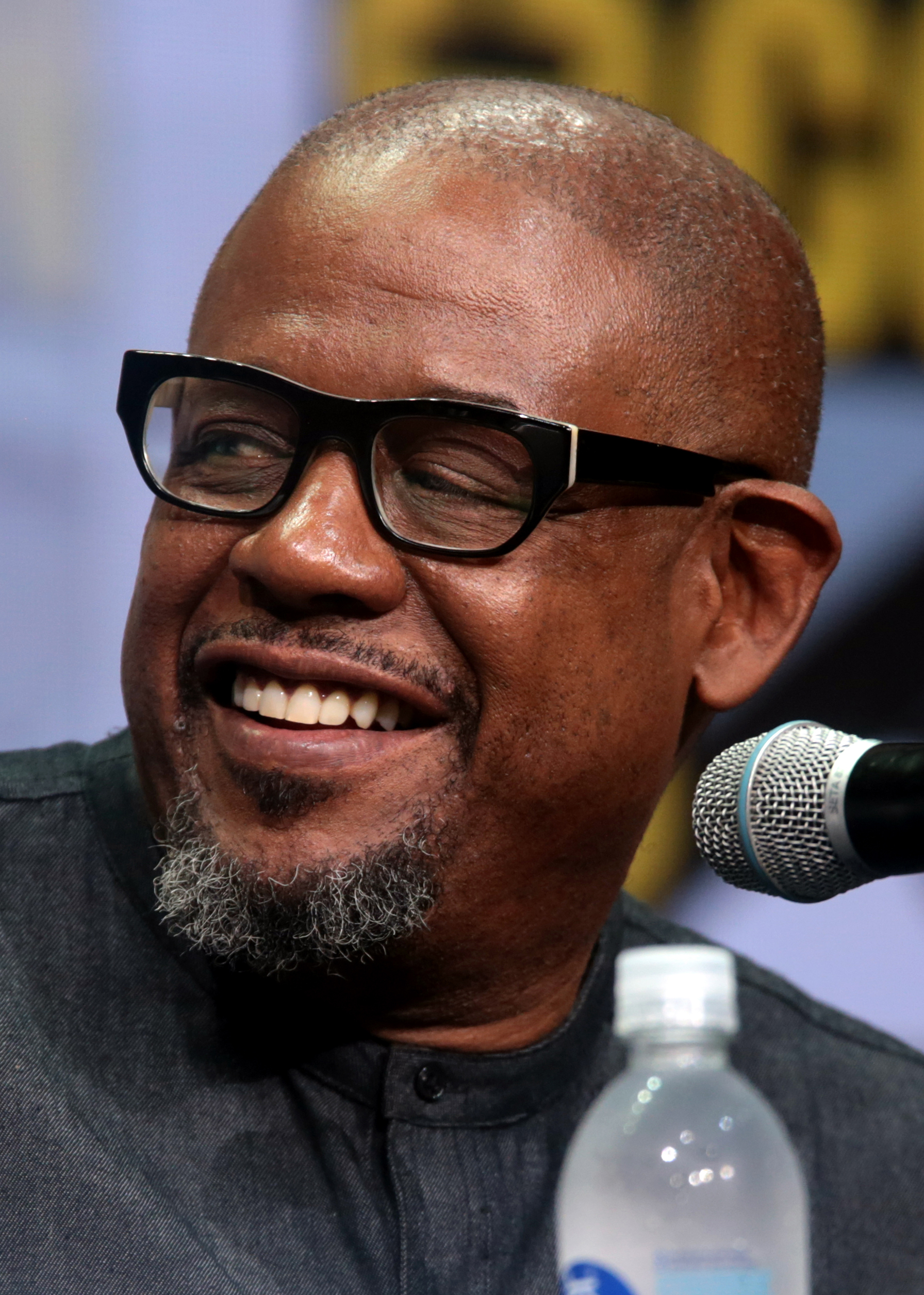
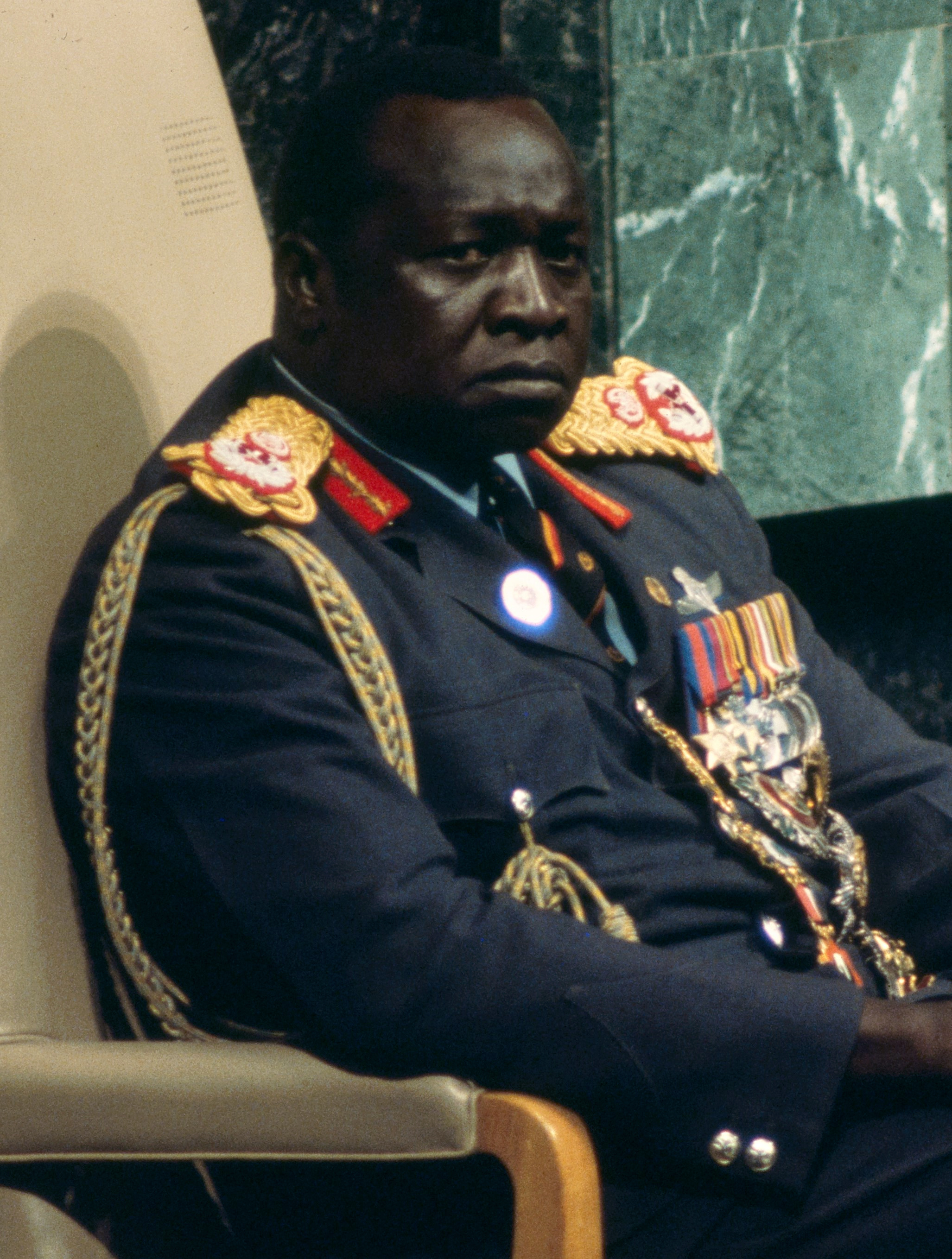
Forest Whitaker (left) received several accolades for his portrayal of Idi Amin (right), including Academy Award for Best Actor.

The Last King of Scotland has an approval rating of 87% on Rotten Tomatoes, based on 183 reviews, with an average score of 7.3/10. The website's critical consensus states: "Forest Whitaker's performance as real-life megalomaniac dictator Idi Amin powers this fictionalized political thriller, a blunt and brutal tale about power and corruption." At Metacritic, the film has a score of 74 out of 100 based on 36 critics, indicating "generally favorable reviews".

Whitaker's performance as Idi Amin was widely praised, with Alex von Tunzelmann observing in The Guardian that, despite its flaws, the film, "is saved by Forest Whitaker's towering performance." However she also criticized the film on the grounds of narrative framing and historical accuracy, particularly for using a white character to explore black history, as well as for glossing over of some of Amin's gravest crimes, such as the mass killings perpetrated under his regime.

Similarly, in a review for The New York Times, Manohla Dargis praised the performances of Whittaker and McAvoy, and called it "a very contemporary, pointedly resonant film about blowback," but also noted that "despite some background filler, Mr. Macdonald isn't interested in furnishing history lessons, and the details of Britain's African adventures remain largely unstated."

=== Accolades ===
Whitaker won in the leading actor category at the Academy Awards, the British Academy Film Awards, the Critics' Choice Movie Awards, the Golden Globe Awards, and the Screen Actors Guild Awards. Whitaker also won awards from the Boston Society of Film Critics, the Los Angeles Film Critics' Association, the National Board of Review, the National Society of Film Critics, the New York Film Critics' Circle, the Washington D.C. Area Film Critics Association, and many other critics awards, for a total of at least 23 major awards, with at least one more nominations.

The film was received well in Uganda, where it premiered two days before Whitaker won the Academy Award.

Award	Category	Nominee(s)	Result	Ref.
AARP Movies for Grownups Awards	Best Movie for Grownups		Won	
Academy Awards	Best Actor	Forest Whitaker	Won	
African-American Film Critics Association Awards	Top 10 Films		2nd Place	
African-American Film Critics Association Awards	Best Picture		Nominated	
African-American Film Critics Association Awards	Best Actor	Forest Whitaker	Won	
Awards Circuit Community Awards	Best Actor in a Leading Role	Forest Whitaker	Runner-up	
BET Awards	Best Actor	Forest Whitaker	Won	
BET Awards	Best Actress	Kerry Washington	Nominated	
Black Reel Awards	Outstanding Actor	Forest Whitaker	Won	
Black Reel Awards	Outstanding Supporting Actress	Kerry Washington	Nominated	
Boston Society of Film Critics Awards	Best Actor	Forest Whitaker	Won	
British Academy Film Awards	Best Film	Andrea Calderwood, Lisa Bryer, and Charles Steel	Nominated	
British Academy Film Awards	Outstanding British Film	Andrea Calderwood, Lisa Bryer, Charles Steel, Kevin Macdonald, Peter Morgan, and Jeremy Brock	Won	
British Academy Film Awards	Best Actor in a Leading Role	Forest Whitaker	Won	
British Academy Film Awards	Best Actor in a Supporting Role	James McAvoy	Nominated	
British Academy Film Awards	Best Adapted Screenplay	Peter Morgan and Jeremy Brock	Won	
British Academy Scotland Awards	Best Film	Lisa Bryer, Andrea Calderwood, Kevin Macdonald, and Charles Steel	Won	
British Academy Scotland Awards	Best Actor	James McAvoy	Won	
British Academy Scotland Awards	Best Screenplay	Peter Morgan and Jeremy Brock	Won	
British Independent Film Awards	Best British Independent Film		Nominated	
British Independent Film Awards	Best Director	Kevin Macdonald	Won	
British Independent Film Awards	Best Actor	James McAvoy	Nominated	
British Independent Film Awards	Best Actor	Forest Whitaker	Nominated	
British Independent Film Awards	Best Screenplay	Peter Morgan and Jeremy Brock	Nominated	
British Independent Film Awards	Best Technical Achievement	Anthony Dod Mantle (for cinematography)	Won	
Chicago Film Critics Association Awards	Best Actor	Forest Whitaker	Won	
Cinema for Peace Awards	The Most Valuable Film Actor	Forest Whitaker	Won	
Critics' Choice Movie Awards	Best Actor	Forest Whitaker	Won	
Dallas-Fort Worth Film Critics Association Awards	Best Actor	Forest Whitaker	Won	
European Film Awards	European Film		Nominated	
European Film Awards	European Director	Kevin Macdonald	Nominated	
European Film Awards	European Actor	James McAvoy	Nominated	
European Film Awards	European Cinematographer	Anthony Dod Mantle	Nominated	
European Film Awards	European Composer	Alex Heffes	Nominated	
European Film Awards	People's Choice Award		Nominated	
Evening Standard British Film Awards	Best Screenplay	Peter Morgan (also for The Queen)	Won	
Evening Standard British Film Awards	Best Technical Achievement	Anthony Dod Mantle (also for Brothers of the Head)	Won	
Florida Film Critics Circle Awards	Best Actor	Forest Whitaker	Won	
Gold Derby Film Awards	Best Lead Actor	Forest Whitaker	Nominated	
Golden Globe Awards	Best Actor in a Motion Picture – Drama	Forest Whitaker	Won	
Golden Reel Awards	Best Sound Editing in Feature Film – Dialogue & ADR	Christian Conrad, Fabian Schmidt, and Dominik Schleier	Nominated	
Hollywood Film Awards	Best Actor	Forest Whitaker	Won	
IndieWire Critics Poll	Best Actor	Forest Whitaker	5th Place	
Iowa Film Critics Awards	Best Actor	Forest Whitaker	Nominated	
Kansas City Film Critics Circle Awards	Best Actor	Forest Whitaker	Won	
Las Vegas Film Critics Society Awards	Best Actor	Forest Whitaker	Won	
Leggio d'oro	Best Male Performance	Paolo Buglioni (dubbing for Forest Whitaker)	Won	
London Film Critics Circle Awards	Actor of the Year	Forest Whitaker	Won	
London Film Critics Circle Awards	British Actor of the Year	James McAvoy	Nominated	
London Film Critics Circle Awards	British Director of the Year	Kevin Macdonald	Nominated	
London Film Critics Circle Awards	British Producer of the Year	Lisa Bryer, Andrea Calderwood, and Charles Steel	Nominated	
London Film Critics Circle Awards	British Film of the Year		Nominated	
Los Angeles Film Critics Association Awards	Best Actor	Forest Whitaker	Won (Note: Tied with Sacha Baron Cohen for Borat.)	
NAACP Image Awards	Outstanding Actor in a Motion Picture	Forest Whitaker	Won	
NAACP Image Awards	Outstanding Supporting Actress in a Motion Picture	Kerry Washington	Nominated	
National Board of Review Awards	Best Actor	Forest Whitaker	Won	
National Society of Film Critics Awards	Best Actor	Forest Whitaker	Won	
New York Film Critics Circle Awards	Best Actor	Forest Whitaker	Won	
New York Film Critics Online Awards	Best Actor	Forest Whitaker	Won	
North Texas Film Critics Association Awards	Best Actor	Forest Whitaker	Won	
Oklahoma Film Critics Circle Awards	Top Ten Films		Won	
Oklahoma Film Critics Circle Awards	Best Actor	Forest Whitaker	Won	
Online Film & Television Association Awards	Best Actor	Forest Whitaker	Won	
Online Film Critics Society Awards	Best Actor	Forest Whitaker	Won	
Phoenix Film Critics Society Awards	Best Actor in a Leading Role	Forest Whitaker	Won	
Political Film Society Awards	Human Rights		Won	
Santa Barbara International Film Festival	American Riviera Award	Forest Whitaker	Won	
Satellite Awards	Best Motion Picture – Drama		Nominated	
Satellite Awards	Best Actor in a Motion Picture – Drama	Forest Whitaker	Won	
Screen Actors Guild Awards	Outstanding Performance by a Male Actor in a Leading Role	Forest Whitaker	Won	
Southeastern Film Critics Association Awards	Best Actor	Forest Whitaker	Won	
St. Louis Gateway Film Critics Association Awards	Best Picture		Nominated	
St. Louis Gateway Film Critics Association Awards	Best Actor	Forest Whitaker	Won	
Stockholm International Film Festival	Best Cinematography	Anthony Dod Mantle	Won	
Toronto Film Critics Association Awards	Best Actor	Forest Whitaker	Runner-up	
USC Scripter Awards		Peter Morgan and Jeremy Brock (screenwriters); Giles Foden (author)	Nominated	
Vancouver Film Critics Circle Awards	Best Actor	Forest Whitaker	Won	
Washington D.C. Area Film Critics Association Awards	Best Actor	Forest Whitaker	Won	
Writers' Guild of Great Britain Awards	Best Screenplay (Feature Film)	Peter Morgan and Jeremy Brock	Nominated	

== Books and articles ==
- Marx, Lesley (Winter 2011). "The Last King of Scotland and the Politics of Adaptation". Black Camera. 3 (1): 54–74.
- Leopold, Mark (2013). "'Print the legend!': Myth and Reality in The Last King of Scotland". In Nigel Eltringham (ed.). Framing Africa. New York: Berghahn Books. pp. 21–38.
- Leopold, Mark (2020). Idi Amin: The Story of Africa's Icon of Evil. New Haven: Yale University Press.
