= Douglas Carswell =

British politician (born 1971)

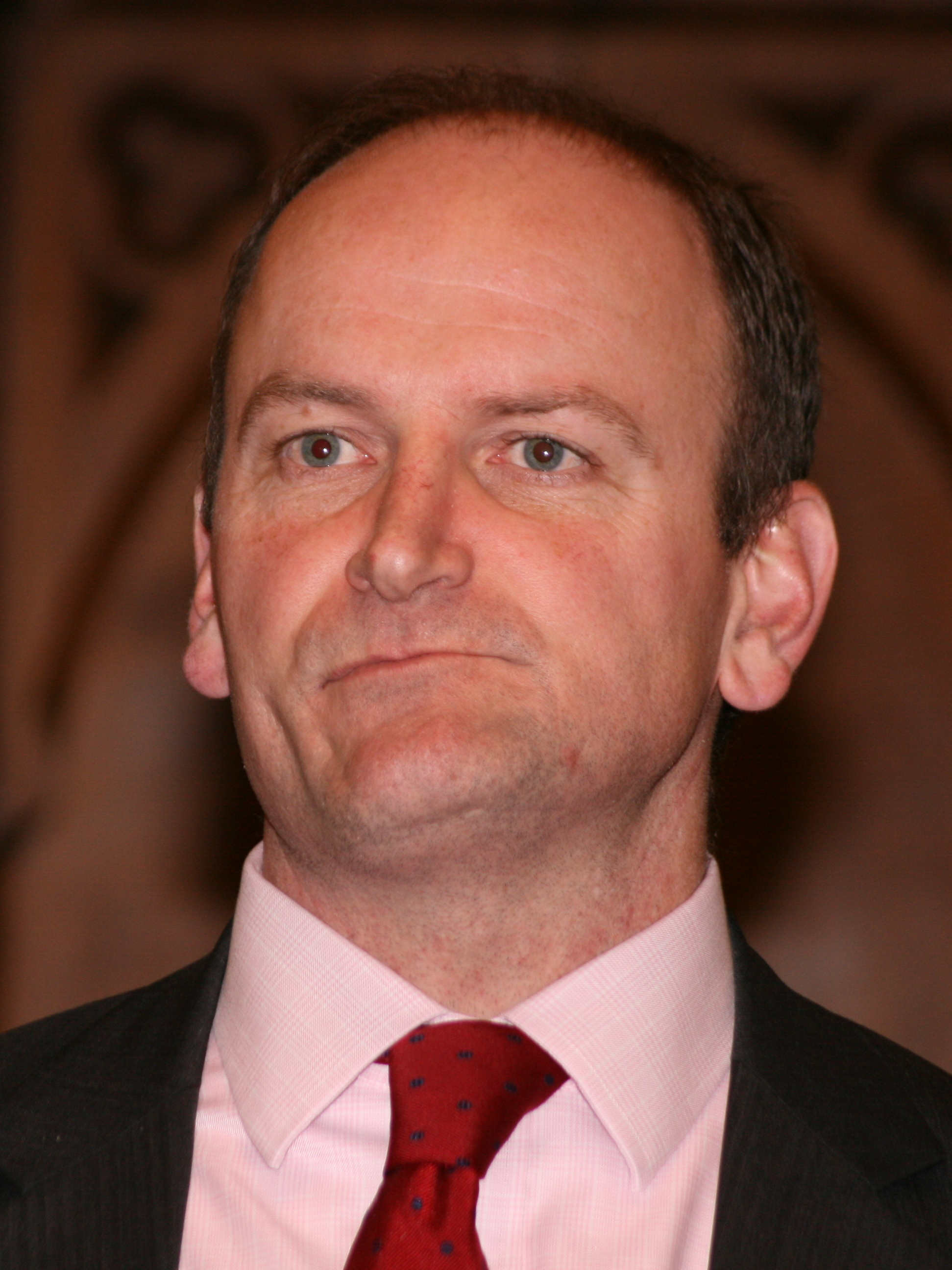
- Carswell in 2015

Member of Parliament for Clacton Harwich (2005–2010)
- In office 5 May 2005 – 3 May 2017
- Preceded by: Ivan Henderson
- Succeeded by: Giles Watling

Personal details
- Born: John Douglas Wilson Carswell; 3 May 1971 (age 55) Africa
- Party: Conservative (before 2014); UKIP (2014–2017); Independent (2017)
- Spouse: Clementine Bailey (m. 2007)
- Children: 1
- Parent: Wilson Carswell (father)
- Education: University of East Anglia (BA); King's College London (MA)

John Douglas Wilson Carswell (born 3 May 1971) is a British former politician who served as a Member of Parliament from 2005 to 2017. He co-founded Vote Leave and since 2021 has served as president and CEO of the Mississippi Center for Public Policy.

As a member of the Conservative Party, Carswell was first elected as the MP for Harwich in 2005 and then for Clacton in 2010. In August 2014, he changed his political allegiance to the UK Independence Party (UKIP) and announced his resignation as an MP. He stood in the subsequent by-election and was returned under his new affiliation, becoming the first elected MP for UKIP. He stated that he was joining UKIP out of a desire to see "fundamental change in British politics" and because he believed "many of those at the top of the Conservative Party are simply not on our side. They aren't serious about the change that Britain so desperately needs."

In 2016, Carswell said that he had "jumped ship with the express goal of changing the image of UKIP and ensuring that it was an asset rather than a liability in the referendum campaign ... to decontaminate the brand". He left UKIP on 25 March 2017 to sit as an independent MP. He did not stand at the 2017 general election. In January 2021, he was appointed as president and CEO of the Mississippi Center for Public Policy.

== Education and early life ==
Carswell is the son of two physicians. He was born in Africa. His father, Wilson Carswell, a Scottish doctor and Fellow of the Royal College of Surgeons, diagnosed the first confirmed Ugandan cases of HIV/AIDS in the early 1980s, and was one of a number of people engaged in drawing attention to the unfolding pandemic. His father's experiences in Uganda were among the inspirations for the character Dr Nicholas Garrigan in Giles Foden's novel The Last King of Scotland. Carswell later attributed his libertarianism to his experiences of the "arbitrary rule" of Idi Amin. His mother, Margaret Jane née Clark (1935–2022) was a doctor and ornithologist.

Carswell was educated at two independent boarding schools for boys: St Andrews School in Turi in Kenya in East Africa, and Charterhouse in Godalming, Surrey, in southern England, followed by the University of East Anglia (UEA), where he was taught by Edward Acton, and graduated with an upper second-class honours bachelor's degree in history in 1993. He then attended King's College London, receiving a master's degree in British imperial history.

Carswell worked as corporate development manager for television broadcasting in Italy from 1997 until 1999, and later for Invesco.

== Political career ==
At the 2001 general election, Carswell contested Sedgefield, the constituency of Prime Minister Tony Blair, as the Conservative candidate. Blair's majority fell by 7,430 votes with Carswell effecting a swing of 4.7% to the Conservatives compared with 1997, against a national swing of 1.8%. In the months before the 2005 general election, Carswell worked in the Conservative Party's Policy Unit, then run by David Cameron.

=== Member of Parliament ===
==== First parliamentary term (2005–10) ====
Carswell was elected to the House of Commons at the 2005 general election for the constituency of Harwich, defeating Ivan Henderson, the sitting Labour Member of Parliament (MP), by 920 votes. He made his maiden speech on 28 June 2005 in the debate on the Identity Cards Bill. He was a member of Conservative Friends of Israel. He served on the House of Commons' Education Select Committee and the Public Accounts Committee. In 2008, he took part in an Armed Forces Parliamentary Scheme trip to Afghanistan, after which he called for more resources to be allocated to British troops serving there.

In December 2009, Carswell tabled a Bill in the House of Commons calling for a public referendum on Britain's membership of the European Union (EU). The Daily Telegraph nominated him a Briton of the Year 2009, and Spectator readers voted him their choice as Parliamentarian of the Year in the same year. In February 2010, he asked Gus O'Donnell to suspend Cabinet meetings held outside London, when it was found that the government was using them to host Labour Party events in marginal seats.

==== Second parliamentary term (2010–15) ====
In the new constituency of Clacton that was created from Harwich at the 2010 general election, Carswell increased his majority over Henderson to 12,068 votes. UKIP decided not to field a candidate against Carswell in the 2010 general election. Instead, the party actively campaigned in support of his re-election in view of his staunch anti-EU views.

In the first week of the new parliamentary session of the Conservative-led Government, Carswell revealed that he intended to force a referendum on the Treaty of Lisbon, over the need to resolve an oversight of apportionment in the European Parliament by re-ratifying the treaty.

Carswell also strongly advocated for electoral reform, including the right for constituents to be able to recall MPs. The Recall of MPs Act 2015 later became law.

On 28 August 2014, Carswell defected from the Conservatives to UKIP. Although not required to do so, he resigned his seat as an MP, thus triggering a by-election. Less than a month before switching parties, Carswell had approved a letter from Conservative supporter Giles Watling to a local newspaper describing UKIP as a "one policy party" and saying "a vote for Ukip will be a vote for Labour". He later said he had been "decidedly cool towards the sentiments of the letter."

==== Clacton by-election ====
Following Carswell's resignation, Roger Lord, UKIP's nominated candidate for the 2015 general election, declared that he still wanted to stand, although the UKIP National Executive Committee voted to select Carswell. Two early opinion polls showed Carswell with a substantial lead. He was successful at the by-election on 9 October 2014, with a substantial majority of 12,404 votes over his nearest rival.

Carswell later contrasted his willingness to put his switch of parties to the electorate to that of the eleven anti-Brexit MPs who switched to The Independent Group, none of whom held by-elections when changing parties. He noted "When I changed parties it didn't occur to me to not hold a by election. If my own electorate weren't supportive, what was the point?"

==== Third parliamentary term (2015–17) ====
At the 2015 general election, Carswell won the seat of Clacton with a majority of 3,437 – down from a majority of 12,404 in the 2014 by-election. Carswell won UKIP's only seat in the general election.

Carswell is a Eurosceptic, and supported Vote Leave – advocating leaving the EU – during the EU referendum in June 2016.

In March 2017, Carswell quit UKIP to become an independent MP for Clacton, leaving UKIP with no MPs in Parliament. On quitting the party he said, "Now we can be certain that that [Brexit] is going to happen, I have decided that I will be leaving UKIP."

On 20 April 2017, following the announcement two days earlier by Prime Minister Theresa May of a snap general election, Carswell confirmed he would not be a candidate in the June election.

His relationship with then-UKIP party leader Nigel Farage was full of "animosity" and "tension"; on several occasions he called for Farage to step down as party leader. Farage called Carswell "irrelevant" in response to them supporting different campaigns to leave the European Union in the 2016 referendum. In response to Carswell calling for the party leader's resignation, Farage said that Carswell should "put up or shut up", further saying that "either he's going to have to accept that [UKIP is unified] or do something different".

Following Farage's resignation as UKIP leader following the EU referendum, Carswell tweeted a "sunshades smiley emoji", which some parts of the media described as showing the "uneasy relationship" between the two men, Carswell later said to the BBC that "I tweet smiley faces all the time, I'm very optimistic". He also said that while Farage had "played a role" in the referendum, the resignation was "a huge opportunity" for the party. This happened a week after Farage suggested that Carswell could be kicked out of the party, saying that "We find somebody inside our party who doesn't agree with anything the party stands for, it's a very odd state of affairs".

=== Parliamentary expenses scandal ===
After being elected in 2005, Carswell originally designated a £1 million flat in London as his second home, and claimed over £21,000 for food, rent and furniture. In 2007 he began renting a house in Thorpe-le-Soken in Essex, which he designated his second home, and again paid a deposit and for furniture, including a £655 loveseat, from his expenses (see Flipping § Second home flipping). Between 2007 and 2009 he claimed £32,000 in expenses for the house, commenting "I believe this is entirely justified". Following an investigation of the expenses of all MPs, he was ordered to repay £2,159 in expenses.

=== Influence in the Conservative Party ===
Conservative Party commentator and Daily Telegraph columnist Charles Moore credits Carswell, together with MEP Daniel Hannan, as the architects behind the idea of a Great Repeal Bill, as well as the concept of a "Contract with Britain" offered during the election, the "recall" of MPs who have displeased their constituents, open primaries for the selection of parliamentary candidates, and plans for elected police commissioners. According to Moore's analysis not only is "The localism of the Carswell/Hannan "direct democracy" movement is now good Coalition orthodoxy", but Cameron's policy guru, Steve Hilton, "enthusiastically lifted several bits of The Plan", the best-selling moderniser book written by Carswell and co-author Daniel Hannan.

Even before the formation of the Coalition, the influence of Carswell's ideas was evident in speeches made by David Cameron – including a speech to the Open University made by Cameron in Milton Keynes in May 2009.

=== Influence on UKIP and Leave ===
New Statesman commentator Stephen Bush has argued that Carswell was correct to recognise that a successful Brexit campaign depended on its messages being associated with people other than Farage, but also observed that there "is no electoral majority to be found in Britain for the libertarian brand of conservatism that Carswell espouses".

Bush also suggested that Carswell's ability to win his seat owed more to the appeal of his party to Clacton's voters than his own personal influence, observing that "the evidence suggests that he has kept his seat thanks to the popularity of the party leaders he has consistently undermined and worked against".

During his time as a UKIP MP, Carswell, along with Mark Reckless and Stephen Crowther, established UKIP Parliamentary Resource Unit Limited.

In June 2016, Carswell claimed that the UK "could very easily get a better trade deal than we have at the moment."

== After politics ==
Carswell co-founded Disruptive, a data analytics company. Companies House filings show that he resigned as a Director on 10 April 2019.

In November 2020, Carswell was appointed to a three-year term as a non-executive director for the Department for International Trade.

In January 2021 Carswell was appointed as president and CEO of the Mississippi Center for Public Policy, and left the UK. He now lives in Jackson, Mississippi.

In June 2024, Carswell expressed his support for Reform UK leader Nigel Farage's candidacy for his previously held constituency of Clacton, stating that he was "thrilled Nigel Farage is standing in my old seat".

In August 2025, Carswell wrote on X "From Epping to the sea, let's make England Abdul free" in response to Epping Forest activists opposing a local hotel housing asylum seekers. Ivan Henderson, the former MP for the town, criticised Carswell's comment as racist.

== In popular culture ==
Carswell was portrayed by actor Simon Paisley Day in the 2019 HBO and Channel 4-produced drama Brexit: The Uncivil War.

== Personal life ==
Carswell and his wife Clementine have a daughter.

== Publications ==
- Direct Democracy – Agenda for a New Model Party
- Direct Democracy; empowering people to make their lives better
- Paying for Localism
- Chief author of The Localist Papers
- The Plan: Twelve Months to Renew Britain – co-written with Daniel Hannan
- The End of Politics and the Birth of iDemocracy
- After Osbrown: Mending Monetary Policy
- Rebel: How to overthrow an emerging oligarchy

Parliament of the United Kingdom
Preceded by Ivan Henderson	Member of Parliament for Harwich; 2005–2010	Constituency abolished
New constituency	Member of Parliament for Clacton; 2010–2017	Succeeded by Giles Watling
