= Ashley Henley =

American teacher and politician (1981–2021)

Member of the Mississippi House of Representatives from the 40th district
- In office January 5, 2016 – January 7, 2020
- Preceded by: Pat Nelson
- Succeeded by: Hester Jackson-McCray

Personal details
- Born: May 17, 1981
- Died: June 13, 2021 (aged 40) Water Valley, Mississippi
- Party: Republican
- Spouse: Brandon Henley
- Children: 1

Ashley Henley (May 17, 1981 – June 13, 2021) was an American teacher and politician from Southaven, Mississippi, who served in the Mississippi House of Representatives from the 40th district from 2016 to 2020. She was a member of the Republican Party.

== Early life and career ==
Henley taught in the DeSoto County School District for 13 years. She was also an adjunct instructor in American history at Northwest Mississippi Community College.

== Political career ==
Henley first ran as a Republican for the Mississippi House of Representatives in the 40th district in the 2015 Republican primary against Pat Nelson, the incumbent. She was one of several challengers to incumbent legislators not supporting private voucher schools who defeated the incumbents with financial assistance from the political action committee of Empower Mississippi.

In 2019, Henley lost her re-election bid to Hester Jackson-McCray, a member of the Democratic Party, by 14 votes. Henley brought suit in state court to overturn the election results. Henley sought a do-over election, but the Mississippi House declined her request, seating Jackson-McCray.

After leaving the state house, Henley worked for the Mississippi Center for Public Policy as a legislative fellow.

== Personal life ==
Henley was married to Brandon Henley. They had a son together.

== Death ==
On June 13, 2021, Henley was shot and killed in Water Valley, Mississippi, close to a trailer where her sister-in-law's burned body was found in December 2020. The sister-in-law's death was reported to be the result of a trailer fire. Though the investigation is ongoing, investigators said since Henley's shooting they are looking at the sister-in-law's death "with fresh eyes". Henley and her husband had previously said that investigators concluded Henley's sister-in-law Kristina Michelle Jones died in an arson, but the couple said Jones was murdered as there was no smoke in Jones's lungs at autopsy, indicating that Jones must have died prior to the fire. The couple also said that law enforcement in Yalobusha County was refusing to do anything substantial about it.

A man who lived across the street from Jones' trailer was later arrested for arson of the trailer, and on June 30, 2022 was indicted for Henley's murder. Those charges were later dismissed without prejudice on motion of an assistant district attorney and Circuit Judge, who wrote "After reviewing the case for trial, attorneys for the State requested additional time to fully investigate and review this matter" in a document filed with the Yalobusha County, Mississippi Circuit Court.
