= Lady Smith =

Lady Smith or Baroness Smith may refer to:

- Anne Smith, Lady Smith (born 1955), Scottish judge and senator of the College of Justice
- Angela Smith, Baroness Smith of Basildon (born 1959), Labour politician and leader of the House of Lords since 2024
- Catherine Smith, Baroness Smith of Cluny (born 1973), Scottish lawyer and daughter of Labour Party leader John Smith
- Elizabeth Smith, Baroness Smith of Gilmorehill (born 1940), wife of Labour Party leader John Smith
- Carmen Smith, Baroness Smith of Llanfaes (born 1996), Plaid Cymru politician
- Jacqui Smith, Baroness Smith of Malvern (born 1962), Labour politician and broadcaster
- Julie Smith, Baroness Smith of Newnham (born 1969), Liberal Democrat academic
- Juana María de los Dolores de León Smith (1798–1872), Spanish-British noblewoman
- Lady May Abel Smith (1906–1994), relative of the British royal family
- Lady Smith, a Splicer model in the video games BioShock and BioShock 2

== See also ==
- Margaret Delacourt-Smith, Baroness Delacourt-Smith of Alteryn (1916–2010), Labour politician
- Ruby McGregor-Smith, Baroness McGregor-Smith (born 1963), British businesswoman
- Ladysmith (disambiguation)
- Lord Smith (disambiguation)
