= Y'all Politics =

Mississippi political website

- Website type: Political blog
- Available in: English
- Dissolved: 2022
- Successor: The Magnolia Tribune
- Creator: Alan Lange
- Editor: Alan Lange
- Website: yallpolitics.com
- Launched: 2004

Y'all Politics was a for-profit political blog focused on political news in Mississippi until 2022. Originally founded in 2004 by Alan Lange to cover the 2005 Jackson mayoral race, the publication documented Mississippi politics from a conservative perspective. The site conducted polling on statewide political issues. In 2013, it was named one of the best state-based political blogs by Chris Cillizza of The Washington Post.

Y'all Politics staff members were featured in a variety of media outlets as experts on Mississippi politics. Staff members included Lange, Frank Corder, a former Pascagoula city councilman, Sarah Ulmer, and Anne Summerhays at the time of closing.

== Magnolia Tribune ==
Launched by Russ Latino, the president of Empower Mississippi, the nonprofit news organization The Magnolia Tribune absorbed the assets of Y'all Politics in December 2022. Alan Lange stepped away from the new organization, but the rest of the Y'all Politics staff transferred to the new publication.

The news organization began producing articles in January 2023. The Tribune features a much larger staff compared to Y'all Politics and covers news, business, culture, opinion, and issues.
