= Pat Nelson =

Pat Nelson may refer to:

- Pat Nelson (Alberta politician)
- Pat Nelson (Mississippi politician)
