= Bob Astles =

British soldier and colonial officer (1924–2012)

- Born: Robert Asketill; 23 March 1924; Ashford, Kent, UK
- Died: 29 December 2012 (aged 88); Wimbledon, London, UK
- Other names: "Major Bob" "The White Rat"
- Citizenship: British; Ugandan (until 1985)
- Occupations: Soldier, colonial officer
- Known for: Association with Ugandan dictator Idi Amin
- Spouses: Monica Astles (m. 1958; div. 1959) Mary Senkatuka (m. 1959)
- Children: 2
- Military career
- Branches: British Indian Army; British Army
- Rank: Lieutenant
- Unit: Royal Engineers
- War: World War II

Robert Astles, BEM (born Robert Asketill; 23 March 1924 – 29 December 2012) was a British soldier and colonial officer who lived in Uganda and became an associate of presidents Milton Obote and Idi Amin.

== Early life ==
Bob Astles was born in Ashford, Kent. He joined the British Indian Army as a teenager and then the Royal Engineers, reaching the rank of lieutenant. Of his war service, he recalled: "I enjoyed being with other nationalities and their fights for world recognition during World War II." He was 21 when he left the United Kingdom for Africa.

== Ugandan career ==
In 1949, Astles was sent on special duties during the Bataka uprising in Buganda. His first job in Uganda was as a colonial officer with the Ministry of Works, then with £100 he set up Uganda Aviation Services Ltd., the first airline in Uganda to employ Africans. As Uganda's independence approached in 1962, Astles became involved with a number of political groups. One of these was led by Milton Obote, who led the country to independence.

=== Idi Amin ===
Astles worked in Obote's government until the 1971 coup d'état, when he transferred his allegiance to Amin.

In December, suspicion fell on Astles because of his previous support for Obote. Amin sent him to Makindye Prison where he spent 17 weeks, often shackled and brutally interrogated. Astles later said, "Amin called me a 'rotten apple' on the radio, and nationalised my airline. It was ordinary Africans who helped me to survive. One guard was kicked to death for helping me."

In 1975, Astles joined Amin's service, becoming the head of the anti-corruption squad and advising the president on British affairs, while running a pineapple farm. He also presided over an aviation service that transported members of the government. Astles later said "I kept my eyes shut, I said nothing about what I saw, which is what they liked". What Astles did or did not do during Amin's reign is a matter of conjecture. Some considered him to be a malign influence on the dictator; others thought he was a moderating presence. That was Astles's own claim. In an interview inside a Ugandan prison, with the journalist Paul Vallely who had secured it after smuggling a message inside a Bible to Amin's former right-hand man, he said: "I was the only person he could trust because I never asked him for anything – no fine house, no privileges, no Mercedes-Benz. I was the only one, perhaps because I was white, who he could be sure was not after his job and his life. If Idi Amin ever had a sincere friend, it was Bob Astles. I was the only person who could cope with him. The other members of his Government would phone me and say: 'Can you come quickly, he is out of control.' I would go and let him shout and rail me and then I would try to calm him down. I was one of the few people he trusted." Astles came to be known as "Major" Bob (the title of major was given to him by Amin) or "the White Rat" among other white Ugandans.

== Imprisonment ==
Following the Uganda–Tanzania War, Astles fled Uganda by crossing Lake Victoria in a canoe to Kenya on 10 April 1979. The following day, Amin fled to Libya, the capital Kampala was captured by the combined forces of the Tanzanian Army and the Uganda National Liberation Army, and Amin's rule over Uganda ended. In Kisumu, Astles surrendered to Kenyan authorities, who then detained him. While detained in Kenya, Astles tried to jump from a third-storey window in an apparent suicide attempt in Nairobi.

Kenyan authorities handed him over to Ugandan police in accordance with their request on 9 June. Astles was brought back to Uganda to face criminal charges.

At the time Kenyan newspapers linked the charges to the death of Bruce McKenzie, one of Kenya's former ministers, in an aircraft explosion. Nevertheless, it was suspected that the bomb was actually meant for Astles, who had refused to fly on the aircraft. Astles was imprisoned for his alleged association with Amin's security apparatus.

Astles was charged with murder, armed robbery, theft, shopbreaking, and stealing from a private house. He pleaded not guilty to all charges.

Astles said he had never committed any murders, never witnessed any murders, never heard Amin order any murders, and never saw Amin murder anyone. Astles said he had lived in constant fear while in Amin's administration, and that he had remained in his position because he thought he could do some good for Uganda.

Astles was acquitted of the charges, but he remained in Luzira Prison for another four years under a detention order because he was considered a threat to state security.

Astles renounced his Ugandan citizenship on 4 December 1985 and he was freed from prison the following day. He returned to the United Kingdom five days later.

== Personal life ==
In 1958, he married Monica, who had come to Uganda with him from Kent. A year later, after they had divorced, Astles married an aristocratic member of the Buganda kingdom, Mary Senkatuka, and they later adopted two children.

Astles later lived in Wimbledon, London, and continued to deny the allegations for which he was imprisoned. After returning to Britain, he dedicated his life to campaigning against superpower interference in African political and economic affairs. He also contributed political commentaries to a number of publications associated with Africa.

Astles died in South West London on 29 December 2012 at the age of 88. The obituary in The Daily Telegraph described him as "the most hated white man in postcolonial Africa".

== Film ==
Bob Astles was played by Leonard Trolley in the 1982 film Amin: the Rise and Fall. The fictional character of Nicholas Garrigan in the book and film The Last King of Scotland was, according to author Giles Foden, loosely based on some events in Astles' life. Foden interviewed Astles while writing his novel. He also drew on Vallely's lengthy interview in The Times.
