= Yarlett =

Yarlett or Yarlet may refer to:

- Claire Yarlett, British born American actress
- Yarlet School, a preparatory school in Staffordshire, United Kingdom
