= Ladysmith =

Ladysmith may refer to:

- Ladysmith, KwaZulu-Natal, South Africa
- Ladysmith, British Columbia, Canada
- Ladysmith, Wisconsin, United States
- Ladysmith, New South Wales, Australia
- Ladysmith, Virginia, United States
- Ladysmith Island, Queensland, Australia, an island in Smith Islands National Park

== Other ==
- Ladysmith (novel), a 1999 novel by Giles Foden
- Ladysmith Black Mambazo, a South African choral group
- Siege of Ladysmith (South Africa), 1900
- Smith & Wesson Ladysmith, a small handgun

== See also ==
- Lady Smith (disambiguation)
- List of people with surname Smith
- Ladismith, Western Cape, South Africa
