= Senator Pope =

Senator Pope may refer to:

== Members of the United States Senate ==
- James P. Pope (1884–1966), U.S. Senator from Idaho from 1933 to 1939
- John Pope (Kentucky politician) (1770–1845), U.S. Senator from Kentucky from 1807 to 1813

== United States state senate members ==
- Carl C. Pope (1834–1911), Wisconsin State Senate
- Christopher Pope (politician) (born 1952), Montana State Senate
- Harold Pope Jr. (born 1974), New Mexico State Senate
- Justin Pope (politician) (fl. 2020s), Mississippi State Senate
- Verle Pope (1903–1973), Florida State Senate
- William Henry Pope (Texas politician) (1847–1913), Texas State Senate
