= Uncrowned King of Scotland =

Uncrowned King of Scotland may refer to:

- Archibald Campbell, 3rd Duke of Argyll
- Henry Dundas, 1st Viscount Melville
- Idi Amin

== See also ==
- The Last King of Scotland
