= Robert L. Jackson (Mississippi politician) =

American politician (born 1955)

Member of the Mississippi State Senate from the 11th district
- In office January 6, 2004 – January 2, 2024
- Preceded by: Delma Furniss
- Succeeded by: Reginald Jackson

Personal details
- Born: August 15, 1955 (age 70) Lambert, Mississippi, U.S.
- Party: Democratic

Robert L. Jackson (born August 15, 1955) is an American politician who served in the Mississippi State Senate, representing the 11th district from 2004 to 2024. He was succeeded by his son, Reginald Jackson.
