= Kamesha Mumford =

American politician

Member of the Mississippi State Senate from the 26th district
- Member
- Assumed office January 6, 2026
- Preceded by: John Horhn

Personal details
- Born: January 7, 1983 (age 43)
- Party: Democratic
- Education: Mississippi State University (BA); Mississippi College School of Law (JD)
- Website: kmumford4senate.com

Kamesha Brown Mumford is an American politician who serves as a member of the Mississippi State Senate for the 26th district. A member of the Democratic Party, Mumford was elected in a special election in 2025.

== Early life ==
Kamesha Mumford was born in Canton, Mississippi. She earned a bachelor's degree in political science with a concentration in women's studies from Mississippi State University and a Juris Doctor from the Mississippi College School of Law.

== Career ==
Mumford works as an attorney in Jackson, Mississippi, focusing in real estate and tax sale law. She is a founding partner of Mumford & Mumford Law, which she runs with her husband, Hinds County Prosecuting Attorney Gerald Mumford.

She previously served as a municipal court judge in Canton, Mississippi, a position she occupied since 2013 before joining the state senate. She was elected as the president of the Mississippi Municipal Judges Association in 2017.

== Personal life ==
She is married to Gerald Mumford. They have two children.

== See also ==
- 2025 United States state legislative elections
