= Reginald Jackson (Mississippi politician) =

Mississippi politician

Member of the Mississippi State Senate from the 11th district
- Incumbent
- Assumed office January 2, 2024
- Preceded by: Robert L. Jackson

Personal details
- Born: Marks, Mississippi, U.S.
- Party: Democratic
- Education: Georgia Southern University (BBA)

Reginald Jackson is a Mississippi state senator, representing the 11th district in the Mississippi State Senate since 2024. His county covers parts or all of Coahoma, DeSoto, Quitman, Tate, and Tunica.

== Biography ==
Jackson was born in Marks, Mississippi, and attended Central Gwinnett High School. He later graduated from Georgia Southern University with a bachelor of business administration in management. He works as a farmer and engineering technician.

He has four children and is of Baptist faith.

== Political career ==
A Democrat, Jackson ran for the Mississippi State Senate for the 11th district after his father, Robert L. Jackson, retired. He won uncontested in both the primary and general election in 2024. He ran in the 2025 Mississippi State Senate special elections following court-ordered redistricting and won with 67% of the vote in the general.

In the senate, he sits on the following committees: State Library; Agriculture; Appropriations; Corrections; County Affairs; Drug Policy; Environment Prot, Cons and Water Res; Ethics; and Gaming.

=== Positions ===
He voted against legislation that cut the Mississippi income tax, lowered the grocery tax, and raised the gas tax.

He cosponsored legislation to expand the literacy curriculum for fourth through eighth grade students, as well as voted against prohibiting diversity, equity, and inclusion programs in public schooling.

He sponsored legislation to allow for the sale of goods produced by incarcerated individuals and legislation to restore voting rights to formerly incarcerated individuals.
