= Yarlet School =

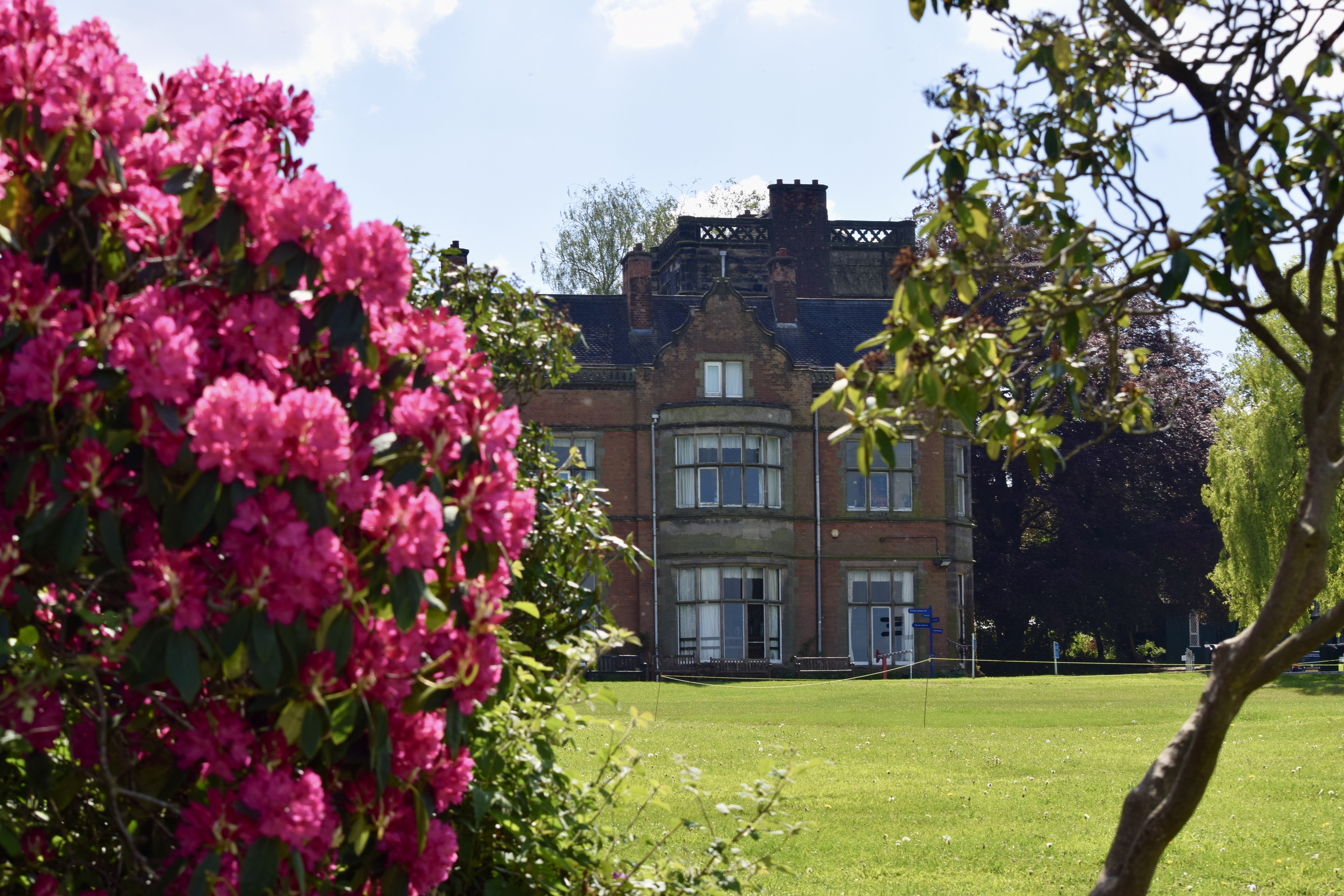

Location
- Stafford, Staffordshire, ST18 9SU; England; 52.8609°N 2.1303°W

Information
- Type: Preparatory day and boarding
- Established: 1873
- Founder: Rev Walter Earle
- Department for Education URN: 124477 Tables
- Headmaster: Ian Raybould
- Gender: Coeducational
- Age: 2 to 13
- Enrolment: 150~
- Colour: red/blue
- Former pupils: Old Yarletians
- Website: www.yarletschool.uk

Yarlet School, formerly Yarlet Hall, is a coeducational preparatory school located in the district of Yarlet, 3 miles (4.8 km) north of the county town Stafford in Staffordshire, England.

== History ==
The school was founded by Reverend Walter Earle, former Second Master at Uppingham School, as a small prep school for boys in Yarlet Hall, a Victorian private house situated in the countryside on the outskirts of Stafford. Hence, Yarlet had close ties with Uppingham early in its history and indeed, many of the boys continued their schooling at Uppingham. Earle founded Bilton Grange in Warwickshire and later moved there in 1887, taking some of the boys with him, but the original school in Yarlet continued to function under a new headmaster. Ties were also established with Rugby School, which remain to this day. It became a charitable trust in 1970. The pre-prep department was opened in 1993. Girls were admitted in 1994 and the school is now fully coeducational.

== Curriculum ==
Subjects taught in Year 3 and above include English, Mathematics, Science, ICT, French, History, Geography, Religious Studies and Music. Pupils are prepared for the Common Entrance Exam which is taken at the end of Year 8.

== Boarding ==
There is no full-time boarding. A flexi-boarding option is also available which allows children to board on Wednesday and Thursday nights. It is closer to a sleep over than full-time boarding and fun activities are arranged for boarding evenings. Since 2009 Yarlet has run a "combined scholarship" programme with several reputable private senior schools to allow deserving children from financially disadvantaged backgrounds to board at Yarlet and then transfer to the senior schools as full boarders after completing their studies at Yarlet.

== Headmasters ==
There have only been eight headmasters (including the incumbent) in the school's history.

- Walter Earle (1873–1887)
- Clement W L Bode (1887–1902)
- Andrew F Fernie (1903-1929)
- Guy C N Mackarness (1929–1937)
- Keith E Tarling (1937–1970)
- David N Carr (1970–1989)
- Richard S Plant (1989–2009)
- Ian M Raybould (2009–present)

== Former Pupils ==
- Michael Edward Ash (1927–2016), mathematician and brewer.
- John Buxton (1912–1989), a scholar, university teacher, poet and ornithologist
- Norman Douglas (1868–1952), writer, now best known for his 1917 novel South Wind
- Giles Foden (born 1967), author, best known for his 1998 novel The Last King of Scotland
- Nick Hancock (born 1962), comedian, actor and television presenter.
- Andy Richards (born 1952), pianist, composer, music producer and keyboardist.

== See also ==
- Yarlet Hall School (1986) on Domesday Reloaded
- Harris, Nigel (1993). The Yarlet Story.
