= Pat Nelson (Mississippi politician) =

American politician

Member of the Mississippi House of Representatives from the 40th district
- In office January 2012 – January 2016
- Preceded by: Ted Mayhall
- Succeeded by: Ashley Henley

Personal details
- Born: May 10, 1949 (age 77) Brookhaven, Mississippi
- Party: Republican

Miles Patrick Nelson (born May 10, 1949) is a retired customer service manager and former Republican member of the Mississippi House of Representatives, now Executive Vice-President of the Home Builders Association of Mississippi. He lives in Brookhaven, Mississippi.

== Background ==
Born May 10, 1949, Nelson graduated from Monticello High School in 1967. He attended Copiah-Lincoln Community College, earned a bachelor's degree in engineering from Mississippi State University in 1973, and went to work for Entergy. He earned an MBA from Tulane University in 2000, and retired from his position as a customer service manager at Entergy in 2011 in order to run for office.

== Legislative career ==
In January 2011, Nelson announced his candidacy for the 40th district of the Mississippi House at a press conference attended by incumbent Ted Mayhall (also a Republican), who announced that he would not be running for re-election and that he was endorsing Nelson. Unopposed in the primary, he defeated Democrat Shirley Aguilera-Logan in the general election with 3,263 votes (64.11%) to Aguilera-Logan's 1,827 (35.89%).

In 2012, Nelson ran in the non-partisan special election for the 19th Mississippi State Senate district (incumbent Merle Flowers had resigned) on November 6. Since no candidate received an absolute majority, there was a run-off between Nelson (who had received 8,307 votes in a four-way race) and fellow Republican David Parker, who had come in first with 10,396. Nelson lost the November 27 run-off, with 2432 votes (37.98%) to Parker's 3971 (62.02%).

On August 4, 2015, Nelson was unseated in the Republican primary by teacher Ashley Henley, with 799 votes (56.6%) to Nelson's 613 (43.4%). Henley was one of several challengers to incumbent legislators not supporting private voucher schools who defeated the incumbents with financial assistance from the political action committee of Empower Mississippi. At the time of his defeat, Nelson pointed out that Empower financed the majority of Henley's campaign, and that much of the PAC's funding in turn came from something called the Mississippi Federation for Children PAC, an organization headquartered in Virginia, which gave Empower $360,000 in March and April of that year, which allowed the mailing of eleven pieces urging voters not to vote for Nelson, but said nothing about Henley or her qualifications. “They took out four pro-public education advocates and I think it’s going to be pretty obvious what the implications are,” Nelson said. “...(We) were the swing votes in the [Republican-controlled] Mississippi House of Representatives on education issues and funding.”

== Personal life ==
Nelson is a member of the Rotary Club and Chamber of Commerce. He was formerly married to the former Katherine Baier, and is a Catholic. On February 15, 2019, he married Sally Burchfield Doty. In October 2020, he became Executive Vice-President of the Home Builders Association of Mississippi.
