= Zanzibar (novel) =

2002 novel by Giles Foden

- First edition
- Author: Giles Foden
- Language: English
- Genre: Fiction
- Published: 2002
- Publisher: Faber & Faber
- Publication place: UK
- Pages: 324
- ISBN: 9780571267361

Zanzibar is a 2002 novel by Giles Foden. It is about a marine biologist working in Zanzibar, who meets an American embassy employee while in Dar es Salaam, embroiling them both in a terrorist conspiracy. The book discusses the threat of al-Qaeda and Osama bin Laden before September 11 attacks.
