= Gary Staples =

American politician (1940–2021)

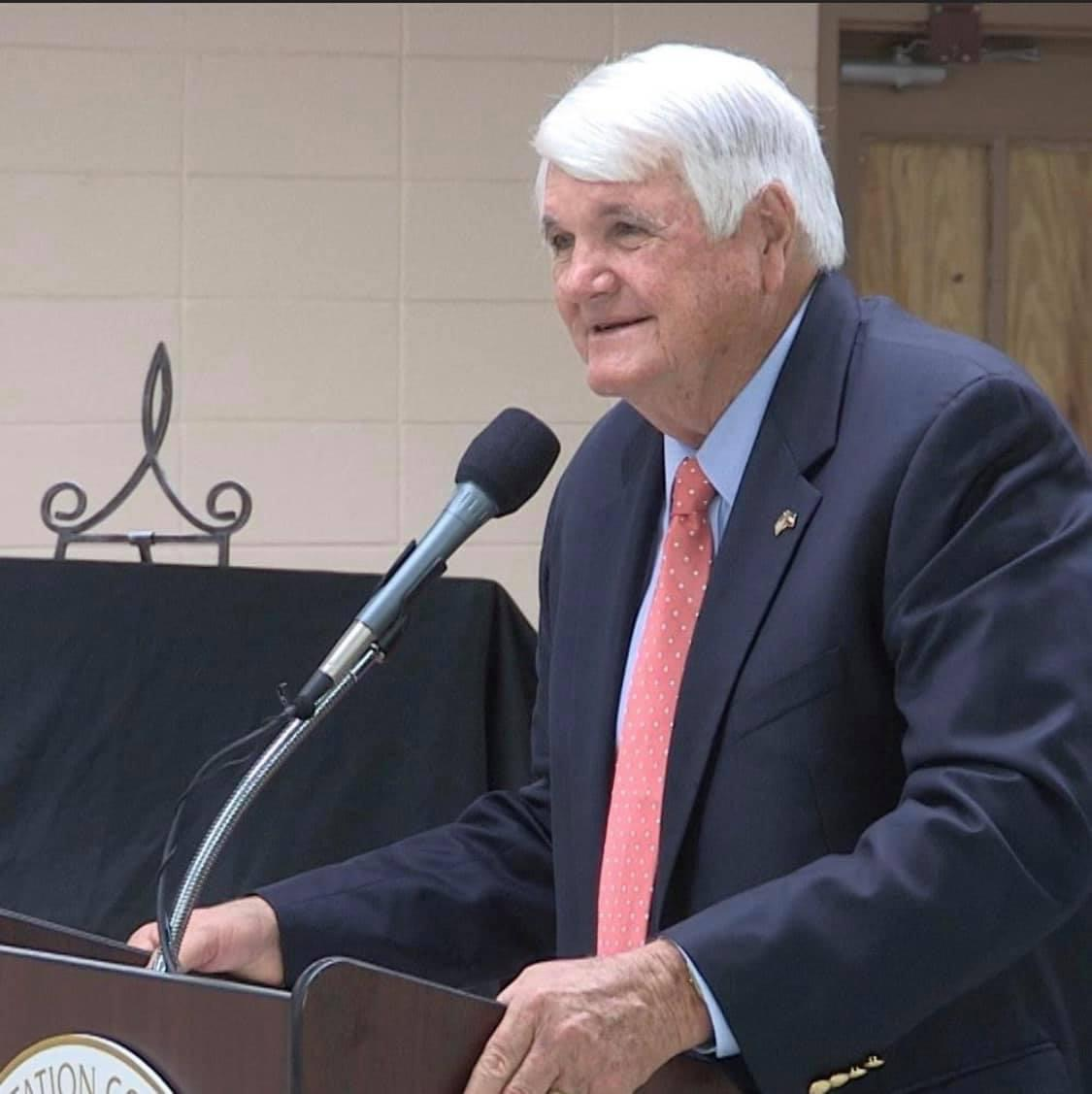

Member of the Mississippi House of Representatives from the 88th district
- In office January 3, 2004 – January 2, 2020
- Succeeded by: Ramona Blackledge

Personal details
- Born: January 16, 1940 Laurel, Mississippi, US
- Died: January 2, 2021 (aged 80) Laurel, Mississippi, US
- Party: Republican

Gary V. Staples (January 16, 1940 – January 2, 2021) was an American Republican politician. In 2004 he was elected as a member of the Mississippi House of Representatives from the 88th District. Ramona Blackledge defeated incumbent Gary Staples in the Republican primary runoff for Mississippi House of Representatives District 88 on August 27, 2019. He previously served from 1988 to 1992. Staples went to the University of Southern Mississippi and Jones County Junior College. He worked for BellSouth.

On January 2, 2021, Staples died from cancer at age 80.
