= Lane Taylor (politician) =

American politician

Member of the Mississippi Senate from the 18th district
- Incumbent
- Assumed office April 29, 2025
- Preceded by: Jenifer Branning

Personal details
- Born: Philadelphia, Mississippi, U.S.
- Party: Republican
- Spouse: Jordan Chambliss
- Children: 2
- Website: Legislative website Campaign website

Lane Taylor is an American businessman and politician serving as a member of the Mississippi State Senate from the 18th district. A Republican, he was first elected in an April 2025 nonpartisan special election to succeed Republican senator Jenifer Branning who left office after being elected to the Mississippi Supreme Court.

== Early life and education ==
Taylor is a native of Philadelphia, Mississippi. He attended Neshoba Central High School and East Central Community College.

== Career ==
Taylor worked as an insurance agent at the Mississippi Farm Bureau, then founded Lane Taylor Auction Company in 2015.

Following Jenifer Branning's election to the Supreme Court of Mississippi, Taylor was the first candidate to announce a campaign in the April 2025 nonpartisan special election to replace her in the Mississippi State Senate. He won the election outright with 56.9% of the vote.

== Personal life ==
Taylor and his wife, Jordan Chambliss, have two children and live in Neshoba County.

== Electoral history ==
2025 Mississippi Senate special election, district 18
Candidate	Votes	%
Lane Taylor	3,011	56.94%
Mark Forsman	1,379	26.08%
Lindsey Kidd	577	10.91%
Jackson Melton	208	3.93%
Marty Sistrunk	113	2.14%
Total votes	5,288	100.00%
