= Don Hartness =

Mississippi state senator

Member of the Mississippi State Senate from the 42nd district
- Member
- Assumed office January 6, 2026
- Preceded by: Robin Robinson

Personal details
- Party: Republican
- Education: Mississippi State University

Don Hartness is an American politician who was elected as a member of the Mississippi State Senate for the 42nd district. A member of the Republican Party, Hartness was elected in a special election in 2025.

== Biography ==
Hartness is from Ellisville, Mississippi. He went to Farragut High School in Knoxville, Tennessee and graduated from Mississippi State University.

He is an Army veteran and a former president of a nonprofit veterans’ organization. He is known as "The Flag Man," as he is often featured in news stories carrying the U.S. flag. He retired from a career in sales.

=== State senate ===
Hartness first ran for election in 2023 in the 42nd district, which was based in Jones County. He lost narrowly to State Rep. Robin Robinson, who was considered the more moderate of the two. Following court-ordered redistricting, he ran again in the 2025 special elections against Robinson, who was now the incumbent state senator. Hartness won in a landslide with over 70 percent of the vote. Analysts pointed to Robinson voting in favor of redistricting, which split up Jones County by placing Ellisville, home to previous state senator and far-right firebrand Chris McDaniel, in the nearby Democratic 34th district.

== Political positions ==
He supported the second version of the Flag of Mississippi before it was replaced due to its Confederate symbolism.

He has voiced support for Congressional term limits.

== Personal life ==
He is married with four children. He is Baptist.

== See also ==
- 2025 United States state legislative elections
