= Juan Barnett =

American politician

Member of the Mississippi State Senate from the 34th district
- In office January 5, 2016 – August 31, 2026
- Preceded by: Haskins Montgomery
- Succeeded by: Vacant

Personal details
- Born: February 21, 1970 (age 56) Heidelberg, Mississippi
- Party: Democratic
- Children: 4
- Education: University of West Alabama
- Occupation: Telecommunications technician, politician

Juan Barnett (born February 21, 1970) is an American politician who served in the Mississippi State Senate, representing the 34th district from 2016 to 2026.

Born in Heidelberg, Mississippi, Barnett served in the U.S. Army during the Gulf War and later graduated from the University of West Alabama. He worked in the telecommunications industry and was elected mayor of Heidelberg in 2001, serving until his election to the senate. An advocate of criminal justice reform and chair of the Corrections Committee, he has pushed legislation to reform the parole system and close the Mississippi State Penitentiary.

== Early life ==
Barnett was born on February 21, 1970, in Heidelberg, Mississippi. He graduated from Heidelberg High School and joined the U.S. Army. He was deployed to Iraq during the First Gulf War; his father was shot to death while he was overseas.

After his service, he enrolled in and graduated from Livingston University (now the University of West Alabama) in 1988. He works as a digital technician for AT&T and serves as Vice President of CWA Local 3509. He has experience working in the telecommunications industry in Indonesia.

== Political career ==
Barnett served as the mayor of Heidelberg from 2001 to 2016 and was vice president of the Mississippi Municipal League. He was the first Black mayor elected for Heidelberg.

He was elected to the Mississippi State Senate in 2015 following incumbent Haskins Montgomery's retirement. He won in a run-off with about 63 percent of the vote. He ran in the 2025 Mississippi State Senate special election uncontested following court-ordered redistricting.

Barnett is a member of the Mississippi-Israel Legislative Caucus in the Senate to strengthen ties between the state and Israel.

Barnett resigned from the Mississippi Senate in August 2026. Barnett suffered a stroke in February, missing much of the 2026 session as a result.

=== Political positions ===
He is an advocate for criminal justice reform. He has worked on legislation to expand early release, reform the parole system, and expand employment opportunities for incarcerated individuals. He has repeatedly pushed legislation as chair of the Corrections Committee to close the Mississippi State Penitentiary.

He voted to change the Mississippi State Flag, arguing the old flag was a dividing symbol.

== Personal life ==
He is married with four children and is of Baptist faith.

He is a member of Alpha Phi Alpha fraternity.
