= Ramona Blackledge =

American politician (born 1952)

Member of the Mississippi House of Representatives from the 88th district
- In office January 7, 2020 – January 31, 2020
- Preceded by: Gary Staples
- Succeeded by: Robin Robinson

Personal details
- Born: September 20, 1952 (age 73)
- Party: Republican
- Education: Mississippi State University

Ramona Blackledge (born September 20, 1952) is an American Republican politician. She briefly served in the Mississippi House of Representatives, representing the 88th district. She resigned a month after being sworn in because she was prohibited from receiving retirement pay while serving in the state legislature.

== Career ==
Blackledge served as a tax assessor-collector for Jones County. In August 2019, she defeated incumbent Gary Staples in a runoff Republican primary election for Mississippi House of Representatives District 88, and she won the general election that November.

== Resignation ==
Before Blackledge was elected, the Mississippi Public Employees Retirement System Board adopted a new regulation that would allow retired public employees to draw upon a portion of their state pensions while serving in the Mississippi Legislature. Four representatives elected to the state legislature in 2019, including Blackledge, expected to withdraw pensions while serving in accordance with this change. However, House Speaker Philip Gunn rejected the change and refused to allow the legislators to receive their pensions while serving in the House of Representatives and receiving a legislative salary. Blackledge resigned as the result of this decision.
