= Chris Massey (politician) =

American politician

Member of the Mississippi State Senate from the 1st district
- In office January 3, 2012 – January 7, 2020
- Preceded by: Doug E. Davis
- Succeeded by: Michael McLendon

Personal details
- Born: September 13, 1971 (age 54) Greenville, Mississippi, U.S.
- Party: Republican
- Spouse: Cathy Herron
- Occupation: Home builder

Chris Massey (born September 13, 1971) is a Republican member of the Mississippi Senate, representing the 1st District since 2012.

Massey was arrested in 2016 for Aggravated Assault with a shovel for an argument with two maintenance workers. He was found guilty and given 6 months Probation.
