= David Parker (Mississippi politician) =

American politician

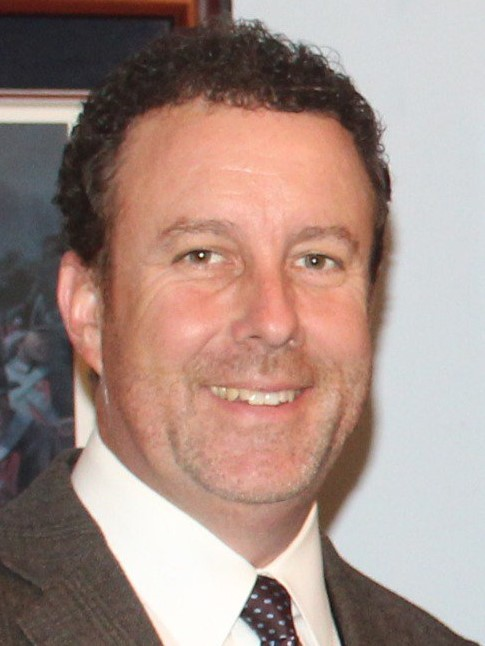

Member of the Mississippi State Senate from the 2nd district
- In office January 5, 2016 – January 6, 2026
- Preceded by: Bill Stone
- Succeeded by: Theresa Gillespie Isom

Member of the Mississippi State Senate from the 19th district
- In office December 11, 2012 – January 5, 2016
- Preceded by: Merle Flowers
- Succeeded by: Kevin Blackwell

Personal details
- Born: David Parker; September 11, 1969 (age 57) Memphis, Tennessee, U.S.
- Party: Republican
- Spouse: Ashleigh Beckett
- Children: 4
- Education: Christian Brothers University; Southern College of Optometry
- Occupation: Optometrist

David Parker (born 1969) is an American optometrist and politician. He served as a Republican member of the Mississippi State Senate for District 2, which includes part of DeSoto county, until 2026.

== Early life, education and career ==
David Parker was born on September 9, 1969, in Memphis, Tennessee. He was educated at Greenbrook Elementary and Southaven High School in Southaven, Mississippi. He graduated from Christian Brothers University on the pre-optometry track. He graduated from the Southern College of Optometry magna cum laude.

Parker works as an optometrist at his own business that he founded. He is a member of the American Optometric Association and the Mississippi Optometric Association.

== Political career ==
Parker won a special election in 2012 to replace retiring senator Merle Flowers in District 19 after defeating Rep. Pat Nelson. The district included parts of DeSoto County and was the most populous district in the state. Legislative redistricting created a new district in DeSoto county, resulting in Parker to run in District 2 for the Mississippi State Senate in 2015. He won the election. In 2019, his seat was considered "Safe Republican" by the Mississippi Center for Public Policy.

He voted to defund Common Core in 2014 on an amendment, which ultimately failed. In the aftermath of the Charleston church shooting in June 2015, Parker called for the Confederate battle flag to be removed from the flag of Mississippi, suggesting it was divisive. He was part of the legislative redistricting committee in the senate in 2021. He authored a proposal to reinstate the ballot initiative in the state.

He declined to run for the 1st Congressional District upon Alan Nunnelee's death.

In 2025, Parker opted not to run for re-election. Democrat Theresa Gillespie Isom won the seat.

== Personal life ==
Parker is married to Ashleigh Beckett and has four children. They reside in Olive Branch, Mississippi. He is a member of the United Methodist Church.
