= African-American Film Critics Association Awards 2006 =

Annual US film awards ceremony

4th African-American Film Critics Association Awards
- Date: December 22, 2006

Highlights
- Best Picture: Dreamgirls

The African-American Film Critics Association Awards 2006, honoring the best in filmmaking of 2006, were given on December 22, 2006.

Dreamgirls, directed by Bill Condon, won four awards; including Best Picture, Best Director and the Best Supporting Acting awards (Eddie Murphy and Jennifer Hudson).

== Top 10 Films ==
1. Dreamgirls
2. The Last King of Scotland
3. The Departed
4. Akeelah and the Bee
5. Catch a Fire
6. Idlewild
7. Bobby
8. The Devil Wears Prada
9. The Pursuit of Happyness
10. Inside Man

== Winners ==
- Best Actor:
  - Forest Whitaker - The Last King of Scotland
- Best Actress:
  - Helen Mirren - The Queen
- Best Director:
  - Bill Condon - Dreamgirls
- Best Picture:
  - Dreamgirls
- Best Supporting Actor:
  - Eddie Murphy - Dreamgirls
- Best Supporting Actress:
  - Jennifer Hudson - Dreamgirls
