= Doug E. Davis =

American politician

Member of the Mississippi State Senate from the 1st district
- In office January 4, 2005 – January 3, 2012
- Preceded by: Bobby Chamberlin
- Succeeded by: Chris Massey

Personal details
- Born: Douglas Edward Davis; June 25, 1977 (age 49) Memphis, Tennessee, U.S.
- Party: Republican
- Education: Mississippi College

Douglas Edward Davis (born June 25, 1977) is a Republican politician who served in the Mississippi State Senate, formerly representing the 1st District (DeSoto County).

== Personal Biography ==
He is the son of DeSoto County Chancery Clerk W. E. "Sluggo" Davis and Wanda Bouchillon Davis and the first cousin of former Southaven mayor Greg Davis. Davis is a graduate of Magnolia Heights High School and Mississippi College.

== Public life ==
Davis is a member of the DeSoto County Economic Development Council, the Hernando Rotary Club, Hernando Chamber of Commerce and is also chairman of the Northwest Mississippi District of the Chickasaw Council of the Boy Scouts of America.

== Political career ==
When Senator Bobby Chamberlin decided to retire from the state legislature, Davis entered the non-partisan December 14, 2004 special election to replace the senator. Since he won over a majority of the vote, 54.45%, a run-off against second highest voter getter was not necessary and he was declared the winner of the seat. Davis took office in 2005 and served until 2012.

In February 2013, Davis was appointed to the Mississippi Parole Board by Governor Phil Bryant and named Chair of the Parole Board in July 2013. Davis was then tabbed as the Chief of Staff for the Mississippi Secretary of State Delbert Hosemann in October 2013, a position where he currently serves.
