= Wilson Carswell =

Surgeon and AIDS researcher

Wilson Carswell OBE FRCS
- Born: John Wilson Carswell; 1937 (age 88–89)
- Education: King's College London (MBBS)
- Known for: Research on HIV/AIDS
- Relatives: Douglas Carswell (son)

John Wilson Carswell OBE FRCS (born 1937) is a Scottish physician who was one of the first medical researchers to identify HIV/AIDS in Uganda.

He graduated from the King's College London with an MBBS in 1961, and was elected a Fellow of the Royal College of Surgeons of England in 1967. He worked as a consultant surgeon at Mulago Hospital, Kampala from 1968 to 1987 where he became a leading AIDS researcher in the country. He later served as medical advisor to the Government of South Africa, and worked in public health in the United States and Asia.

His experiences in Uganda, where he met Idi Amin, were an inspiration for the character Dr. Garrigan in Giles Foden's novel The Last King of Scotland.

He married Margaret Jane Clark, with whom he had four children. His son Douglas Carswell was the first elected UK Independence Party Member of Parliament.
