= Theresa Gillespie Isom =

American politician

Member of the Mississippi State Senate from the 2nd district
- Incumbent
- Assumed office January 6, 2026
- Preceded by: David Parker

Personal details
- Born: March 3, 1953 (age 73) Memphis, Tennessee, U.S.
- Party: Democratic Party
- Education: University of St. Francis (BS); Union University (BSN); University of Tennessee, Knoxville (MS)
- Occupation: politician, healthcare administrator, nurse

Theresa Gillespie Isom is an American politician and former healthcare administrator. A Democrat, she was elected to the Mississippi State Senate, representing the 2nd District, which includes parts of DeSoto and Tunica counties. Isom won a special election on November 4, 2025, becoming the first African American and first female senator to represent DeSoto County. Her victory helped break a Republican supermajority in the state senate.

== Early life ==
A native of Memphis, Tennessee, Isom moved to Mississippi in 2005. She served as the director of nursing at the Tennessee College of Applied Technology. Isom also chaired the Tennessee Board of Regents Practical Nursing Coordinators. additionally, Isom served as the chief nursing officer for Methodist Hospital.

== Mississippi State Senate ==
=== 2025 election ===
Isom ran as the Democratic candidate for Mississippi State Senate District 2 in a special election held on November 4, 2025. The election was held after a federal court ordered Mississippi to create new, majority-Black legislative districts, ruling that the state's previous maps had diluted Black voting strength. The newly drawn District 2, which Isom sought, covers portions of DeSoto and Tunica counties. The seat was previously held by Republican David Parker, who retired following the redistricting.

Isom won the election, defeating Republican candidate Charlie Hoots by a margin of 63 percent to 37 percent. She’s both the first African American senator and the first female senator in DeSoto County's history. Isom's win, along with another Democratic victory the same night, broke the Republican supermajority in the Mississippi Senate for the first time in six years.

During her 2025 campaign, Isom's platform focused on healthcare and education. She advocated for the expansion of Medicaid in Mississippi and for the protection of rural hospitals. She also prioritized improving public schools, boosting public school funding, and making career and technical education more accessible. Other priorities included creating more jobs in underserved areas, hosting community job fairs, and helping families obtain affordable healthcare.

== Personal life ==
Isom is a member of the Alpha Kappa Alpha sorority. She is a Baptist, and she has one child.
