= Haskins Montgomery =

American politician

Member of the Mississippi Senate from the 36th district
- In office 2008–2016
- Succeeded by: Juan Barnett

Personal details
- Born: February 12, 1952 (age 74) Bay Springs, Mississippi
- Party: Democratic
- Children: 3
- Education: Mississippi State University
- Occupation: Businessman

Haskins Montgomery is a former Democratic member of the Mississippi Senate, representing the 34th District from 2008 to 2016. He represented Jasper, Jones, Scott and Smith Counties.

Montgomery served as an alderman and mayor of Bay Springs, Mississippi prior to his time in the senate. He decided to not run for re-election in 2015. He is married with three children.
