= Robin Robinson (politician) =

American politician

Member of the Mississippi Senate from the 42nd district
- In office January 2, 2024 – January 6, 2026
- Preceded by: Chris McDaniel
- Succeeded by: Don Hartness

Member of the Mississippi House of Representatives from the 88th district
- In office August 10, 2020 – January 2, 2024
- Preceded by: Ramona Blackledge
- Succeeded by: Chuck Blackwell

Personal details
- Born: September 12, 1956 (age 69) Laurel, Mississippi, U.S.
- Party: Republican
- Education: Jones County Junior College (AA); University of Southern Mississippi (BS)

Robin J. Robinson (born September 12, 1956) is an American politician and accountant who served as a member of the Mississippi State Senate from the 42nd district. She assumed office on January 2, 2024, and left on January 6, 2026. She previously served in the Mississippi House of Representatives, representing the 88th district from 2020 to 2024.

== Early life and education ==
Born in Laurel, Mississippi, Robinson attended Northeast Jones High School. She earned an Associate of Arts degree from Jones County Junior College and a Bachelor of Science in business administration from the University of Southern Mississippi.

== Career ==
Robinson worked in various roles at Sanderson Farms for 40 years. During her tenure, she worked as cost accountant, chief accountant, chief internal auditor, manager of human resources, manager of organization development, and member of the executive board. She was elected to a member of the Mississippi House of Representatives in an August 2020 special election. She was elected to the Mississippi State Senate in 2023.
