= Merle Flowers =

American politician

Member of the Mississippi State Senate from the 19th district
- In office January 6, 2004 – July 11, 2012
- Preceded by: Timothy L. Johnson
- Succeeded by: David Parker

Personal details
- Born: October 20, 1968 (age 57) Camden, Tennessee
- Children: 4
- Education: Auburn University; University of Mississippi
- Profession: Businessman

Merle Flowers (born October 20, 1968) is an American businessman and politician from the state of Mississippi. A member of the Republican Party, Flowers served in the Mississippi State Senate.

Flowers retired from the Mississippi Senate in 2012 to spend more time with his family. Flowers is Chairman of the Board for Methodist LeBonheur Healthcare Olive Branch Hospital. Flowers is former Scoutmaster of Boy Scout Troop 241 and father of 5 Palm Eagle Scout, Jackson Flowers. He is President of Flowers Properties, LLC in DeSoto County. He is a member of The Well Methodist Church in Lewisburg. Flowers serves on two statewide Boards; The Mississippi Development Bank and The Mississippi Business Finance Corporation.
