= Lord Smith =

Lord Smith may refer to:

- Rodney Smith, Baron Smith (1914–1998), British surgeon
- Chris Smith, Baron Smith of Finsbury (born 1951), British politician
- Peter Smith, Baron Smith of Leigh (born 1945), British politician
- Philip Smith, Baron Smith of Hindhead (born 1966), British politician
- Robert Smith, Baron Smith of Kelvin (born 1944), British businessman
- Trevor Smith, Baron Smith of Clifton (1937–2021), British academic and politician

== See also ==
- Anthony Hamilton-Smith, 3rd Baron Colwyn (born 1942)
- Arthur Smith-Barry, 1st Baron Barrymore (1843–1925)
- Charles Delacourt-Smith, Baron Delacourt-Smith (1917–1972)
- Donald Smith, 1st Baron Strathcona and Mount Royal (1820–1914)
- John Smith, Baron Kirkhill (born 1930)
- Randal Smith, 2nd Baron Bicester (1898–1968)
- Robert Dixon-Smith, Baron Dixon-Smith (born 1934)
- Robert Smith, 1st Baron Carrington (1752–1838)
- Vivian Smith, 1st Baron Bicester (1867–1956)
