= Empower Mississippi =

Mississippi lobbying group

- Type: Nonprofit
- Purpose: School choice advocacy
- Location: Ridgeland, Mississippi
- President: Grant Callen
- Website: empowerms.org

Empower Mississippi is a Mississippi lobbying group that supports private school voucher programs in the state. The group is a nonprofit 501(c)(4) political advocacy organization with an affiliated political action committee (Empower PAC) and 501(c)(3) arm (Empower Mississippi Foundation). Empower Mississippi has "successfully pushed a number of education reform policies through the Mississippi Legislature."

== Activities ==
Empower Mississippi is an independent, nonprofit advocacy organization. The group has worked to expand educational options in the state. The group's first activity was to support the Equal Opportunity for Students with Special Needs Act in 2013, which provides vouchers of up to $6,500 for educational savings accounts for parents of students with disabilities. Empower Mississippi's PAC has spent money in Republican state legislative primaries, seeking to elect candidates the group views as more likely to pass legislation expanding opportunity for Mississippians.

Since 2015, the group has been an influential lobbying force in the state, donating hundreds of thousands of dollars to conservative state legislators. In 2015, Empower Mississippi's PAC supported challengers who unseated four Republican House incumbents in DeSoto County. Empower Mississippi targeted the incumbents, including Republican representatives Wanda Jennings and Pat Nelson, because they opposed school choice measures backed by Empower Mississippi. That year, Empower Mississippi's PAC spent approximately $300,000 on 18 state legislative primaries. From 2015 to 2019, Mississippi Lieutenant Governor Tate Reeves received $45,000 from the group; in 2019, Reeves supported a successful last-minute amendment to a state budget bill that appropriated $2 million for the state's Education Scholarship Account private school voucher program.

Empower Mississippi supported a 2019 ruling by the Supreme Court of Mississippi, which upheld the constitutionality of the 2013 Mississippi Charter Schools Act, which allows students who live in failing school districts to apply to attend a charter school.

== See also ==
- Education in Mississippi
- Mississippi Center for Public Policy
