= Ladysmith (novel) =

1999 novel by Giles Foden

- First edition cover from 1999
- Author: Giles Foden
- Language: English
- Genre: Historical novel
- Publisher: Faber and Faber
- Publication date: 2 December 1999
- Publication place: United KingdomUK
- Media type: Print (Hardback & Paperback)
- Pages: 336 pp (UK paperback edition) & 304 pp. (US hardback edition)
- ISBN: 0-571-19733-7 (UK first paperback edition) & ISBN 0-375-40920-3 (US hardback edition)
- OCLC: 42407140

Ladysmith is Giles Foden’s second novel. It was published in 1999 by Faber and Faber.

== Plot summary ==
The time is November 1899 through February 1900; the place is Ladysmith, a small railway town in the British Colony of Natal near the border with the Boer Republics. The Boers have surprised the world with initial victories over the British Army and have now laid siege to Ladysmith. As they shell the town from the surrounding hills, people die, disease is rampant, structures collapse, starvation looms, there is panic about enemy agents, and yet the British muddle through.

The setting of Giles Foden’s novel is historically accurate, and a number of historical figures appear as characters; for example, the Boers arrest a young reporter named Winston Churchill as he struggles to reach the besieged town, and an Indian lawyer-turned-medical volunteer named Mohandas K. Gandhi becomes more committed to his philosophy of active non-violence.

The core of Ladysmith is a fictionalised version of a love story that Giles Foden found in the letters of his great-grandfather, who was a British soldier at Ladysmith. Bella, the Irish hotelkeeper's daughter, falls in love, first, with a British soldier and later with a Portuguese barber, thus defying convention and rebelling against her father.

== Release details ==
- 1999, UK, Faber and Faber, ISBN 0-571-19733-7, Pub date 2 December 1999, paperback
- 2000, UK, Faber and Faber, ISBN 0-571-20366-3, Pub date 3 November 2000, paperback
- 2000, UK, Alfred A. Knopf, ISBN 0-375-40920-3, Pub date ? April 2000, hardback
- 2001, USA, Vintage, ISBN 0-375-70837-5, Pub date ? August 2001, paperback
