= Michael McLendon =

American politician

Member of the Mississippi State Senate from the 1st district
- Incumbent
- Assumed office January 7, 2020
- Preceded by: Chris Massey

Personal details
- Born: Michael Warren McLendon; November 14, 1963 (age 62) Dallas, Texas, U.S.
- Party: Republican
- Children: 2
- Education: Northwest Mississippi Community College (attended); Memphis State University (BBA)
- Occupation: Politician, insurance producer

Michael McLendon (born November 14, 1963) is an American politician and insurance producer who has served in the Mississippi State Senate from the 1st district since 2020.

Born in Dallas, McLendon moved to and studied in Tennessee. After graduating from Memphis State University, he worked as an insurance agent for Farm Bureau Insurance before joining a Memphis-based firm as an insurance producer. He was elected to the Hernando City Council in 2013 and served in that position until his election to the Mississippi State Senate in 2019, when he narrowly ousted incumbent Chris Massey. He faced a competitive primary in 2025 but won by wide margins. While in office, he passed legislation that banned the teaching of critical race theory.

== Early life and education ==
McLendon was born on November 14, 1963, in Dallas, Texas. He later moved to Tennessee, where he attended Oakhaven Baptist Academy in Memphis. He graduated from Northwest Mississippi Community College and Memphis State University. While a student at Memphis State, he worked as an assistant golf professional at a golf course.

== Career ==
McLendon worked as an insurance agent for Farm Bureau Insurance of Mississippi for 19 years in a Hernando-based office. He later joined Lipscomb & Pitts Insurance in mid-2013, working in their Memphis office as an insurance producer. In the same year, he ran for the Hernando City Council for Ward 4 and unseated the incumbent councillor in the primary election by 20 votes; he was uncontested in the general election. He saw sworn into office by Bobby Chamberlin in July 2013.

=== Senate ===
In 2019, he ran for election to the Mississippi State Senate to represent District 1, which represents part of DeSoto county. McLendon faced off against incumbent Chris Massey in the Republican primary. The race centered on local issues: McLendon campaigned as an opponent to annexation attempts of unincorporated DeSoto county by municipal authorities of Olive Branch, Mississippi, while Massey was criticized for doing enough to stop the annexation attempts in the legislature. McLendon came second in the primary but won the runoff election against Massey. He won the general election uncontested. He ran uncontested during his re-election in 2023.

In 2025, McLendon's district was altered due to court-ordered redistricting (now including parts of Tate County), and special elections for the seat were set for September 2025. He announced his re-election for the seat in June 2025. He defeated Jon Stevenson, a Hernando businessman and DeSoto County GOP finance chairman, in a competitive primary election by wide margins. Stevenson was endorsed by multiple mayors in the district and was well-funded.

While in the senate, McLendon authored a bill that banned the teaching of critical race theory; the bill was later passed and signed by the governor. He has voted for bills that increased teacher pay and lowered taxes. For the 2026 session, he sits as the Chair of the Labor committee and the Vice Chair for the Highways and Transportation committee.

== Personal life ==
He married Victoria Blythe-McLendon, a former flight attendant whom he met at Memphis State, in 1989; he has two children with her. He is a Methodist.

McLendon was arrested in 2023 for driving under the influence but had the charged dismissed in 2024.
