= David Lee Jordan =

American politician

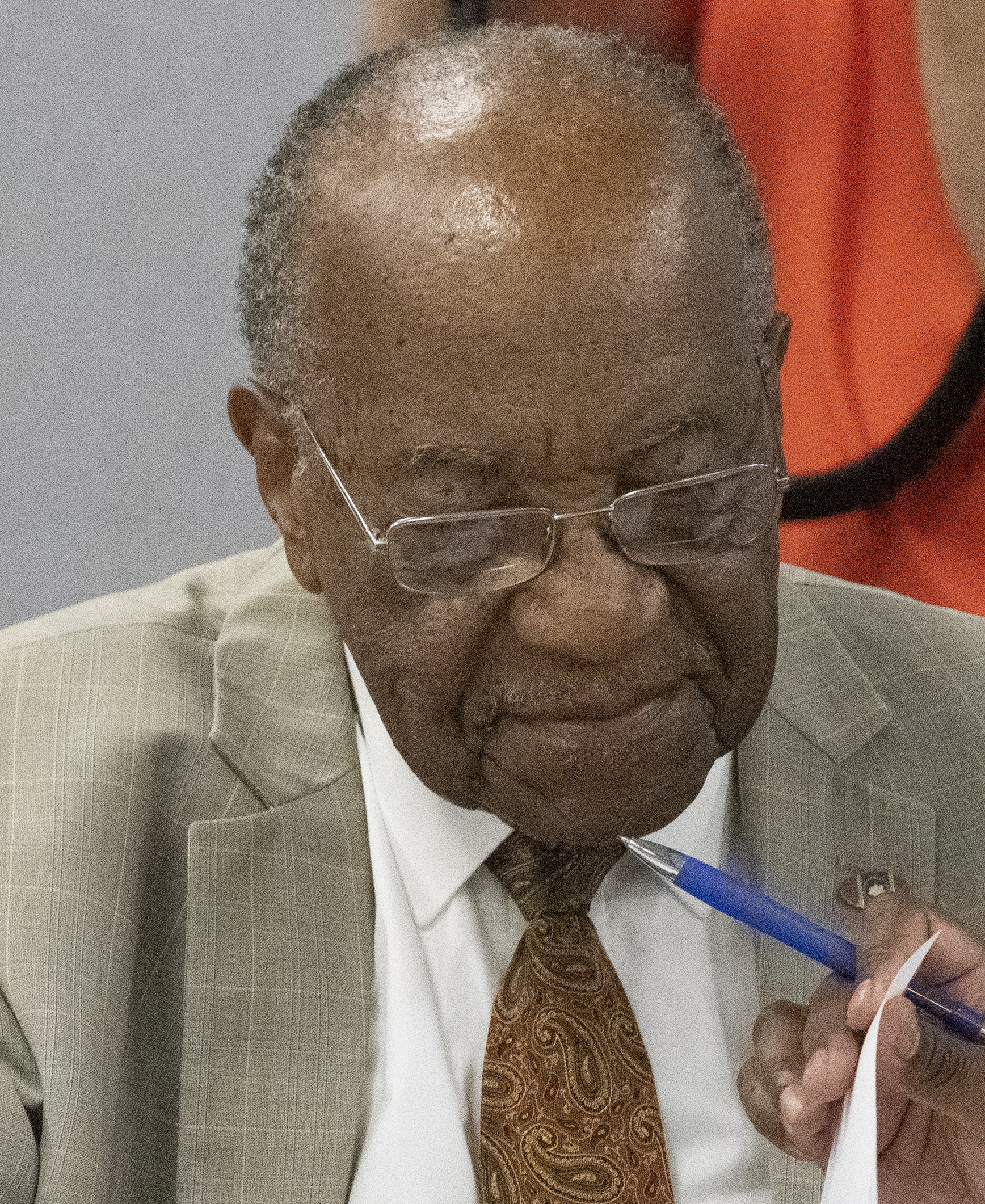

Member of the Mississippi State Senate from the 24th district
- In office January 5, 1993 – June 30, 2025
- Succeeded by: Justin Pope

Personal details
- Born: April 3, 1933 (age 93) Leflore County, Mississippi, U.S.
- Party: Democratic
- Spouse: Christine Bell Jordan
- Education: University of Wyoming; Mississippi Valley State University
- Occupation: Politician, educator

David Lee Jordan (born April 3, 1933) is an American politician who is a former Democratic member of the Mississippi State Senate, representing the 24th District from 1993 to 2025. Jordan is the son of a sharecropper who participated in the Civil Rights Movement, and worked for 33 years as a schoolteacher in Mississippi public schools. He retired in June 2025.

== Biography ==
David Lee Jordan was born on April 3, 1933, in Greenwood, Mississippi. Jordan spent his early life as a sharecropper alongside his family. He was able to attend school only after December each year. Jordan graduated from Broad Street High School. Jordan served in the U.S. Army Reserve from 1955 to 1961. He attended Mississippi Valley State University, graduating with a B. S. in natural science in 1959. He later attended the University of Wyoming, graduating with a M. S. in chemistry in 1969. In 1970 he became a science teacher at the W. C. Williams school in Greenwood. In 1975, he ran for the Mississippi House of Representatives against Bunky Huggins.

In 1985, he became part of the Greenwood City Council and was the first black person on the council. He was elected to the Mississippi State Senate in 1992. Jordan resigned from the Senate in the middle of the 2024-2028 term and was succeeded by Justin Pope.

== Personal life ==
Jordan married Christine Bell on June 9, 1954. They have four children.
