= Justin Pope (politician) =

American politician

Member of the Mississippi State Senate from the 24th district
- Incumbent
- Assumed office January 6, 2026
- Preceded by: David Lee Jordan

Personal details
- Born: Batesville, Mississippi, U. S.
- Party: Democratic
- Education: Mars Hill University (BS)

Justin Pope is an American politician who was elected as a member of the Mississippi State Senate for the 24th district. A member of the Democratic Party, Pope was elected in a special election in 2025.

== Biography ==
Justin Pope was born in Batesville, Mississippi. He attended South Panola High School in Batesville and graduated from Mars Hill University in North Carolina.

He was an educator at Mississippi Valley State University. He currently works as a hospital administrator.

He unsuccessfully ran for Panola County Chancery Clerk in 2023. He defeated Curressia Brown on a runoff election on December 2, 2025, to succeed David Lee Jordan in the Mississippi State Senate for the remainder of the 2024-2028 session.

He is Methodist and is married with three children.

== See also ==
- 2025 United States state legislative elections
