= The Last King of Scotland =

1998 novel by Giles Foden

- First edition
- Author: Giles Foden
- Language: English
- Genre: Novel
- Publisher: Faber and Faber
- Publication date: 1998
- Publication place: United Kingdom
- Media type: Print (hardback and paperback)
- ISBN: 0-571-19564-4
- OCLC: 40981851

The Last King of Scotland is a novel by English writer Giles Foden, published by Faber and Faber in 1998. Focusing on the rise of Ugandan President Idi Amin and his reign as dictator from 1971 to 1979, the novel, which interweaves fiction and historical fact, is written as the memoir of a fictional Scottish doctor in Amin's employ. Foden's novel received critical acclaim and numerous awards when it was published. In 2006, a loose eponymous film adaptation was released.

== Plot summary ==
The protagonist is a fictional character named Nicholas Garrigan, a young Scottish doctor who goes to work in Uganda out of a sense of idealism and adventure, arriving on the day of the 1971 Ugandan coup d'état. He relates how he came to be the personal physician and confidant of Amin, the president of Uganda during the Second Republic of Uganda. The novel focuses on Garrigan's relationship and fascination with the president, who soon grows into a brutal and ruthless dictator. Garrigan consciously and repeatedly acts against his better judgment, remaining in Amin's employment until he is far past the point of easy escape physically and morally. Mesmerized by Amin's charm and charisma, he is gradually drawn complicitly into the corruption and brutality of Amin's rule (including his personal participation in the severance of British relations with Uganda, the murder of Kay Amin, the events of Operation Entebbe and the murder of Dora Bloch, and the Uganda-Tanzania War) with fatal results for his friends and colleagues, which Garrigan treats with a mixture of physical disgust; nonchalant, fatalistic acceptance of living under a totalitarian regime; and self-serving denial of culpability.

== Development and inspiration ==
Drawing on his twenty years of living in Africa and his background as a journalist, Foden researched the events surrounding Amin's rise to power and downfall. He interviewed many of those who watched and participated in Amin's eight-year reign and evokes the form of a memoir by inserting fictional newspaper articles and journal entries, along with actual events.

In a 1998 interview with the online magazine Boldtype, Foden said he based parts of Garrigan's character on a real associate of Amin's named Bob Astles. As a British soldier who worked his way into Amin's favour, Astles was much more "proactive" than Garrigan, according to Foden, and he paid the price by spending six and a half years in a Ugandan jail after the fall of his protector.

Astles compromised himself by his direct association with Amin's security forces. While Amin was in power, Astles was alternately either favoured or punished; he was imprisoned and tortured on at least one occasion. Foden drew in part on a lengthy interview with Astles in The Times by the journalist Paul Vallely, who spoke to Astles in a Ugandan jail after smuggling a message in to Amin's henchman in a Bible.

Another real-life figure who has been mentioned in connection with Garrigan is Scottish doctor Wilson Carswell. Amin's personal physician was, in fact, a Ugandan doctor called Paul D'Arbela.

The title of the book refers to Amin's declaring himself the "King of Scotland". Foden claims that the book is an adaptation of William Shakespeare's Macbeth as a third-world dictator.

== Awards and nominations ==
- 1998 James Tait Black Memorial Prize (for fiction) (shortlist)
- 1998 Whitbread First Novel Award
- 1998 Winifred Holtby Memorial Prize
- 1999 Betty Trask Award
- 1999 Somerset Maugham Award

== Editions in print ==
- 1998: New York: Knopf; Distributed by Random House, hardback, ISBN 978-0-375-40360-6 (English)
- 1998: London: Faber Paperbacks, paperback, ISBN 978-0-571-19486-5 (English)
- 1998: Faber and Faber, paperback, ISBN 0-571-19564-4 (English)
- 1999: Vintage Books USA, paperback, ISBN 0-375-70331-4 (English)
- 1999: Random House USA, hardcover, ISBN 0-375-40360-4 (English)

== Stage adaptation ==
The book was adapted for the stage by Steve Waters in 2019, opening at the Crucible Theatre, Sheffield; Clare Brennan, writing for The Guardian, gave the play three stars out of five, describing it as "morally flawed", noting that the adaptation had rendered the protagonist, Garrigan, "even more passive than the novel, since we have no access to his interior life." She wrote that "since Garrigan is given no dramatic drive, the motor for the play’s progression is Amin’s increasing monstrousness. The dictator becomes the villain-hero of the action, and that while the book encourages the reader to self-reflect through Garrigan's complicity, "Waters’s adaptation allows us to remain comfortably in our seats, condemning, from a distance, the actions of others."
