= Paul Vallely =

British journalist (born 1951)

Paul Vallely CMG FRSA
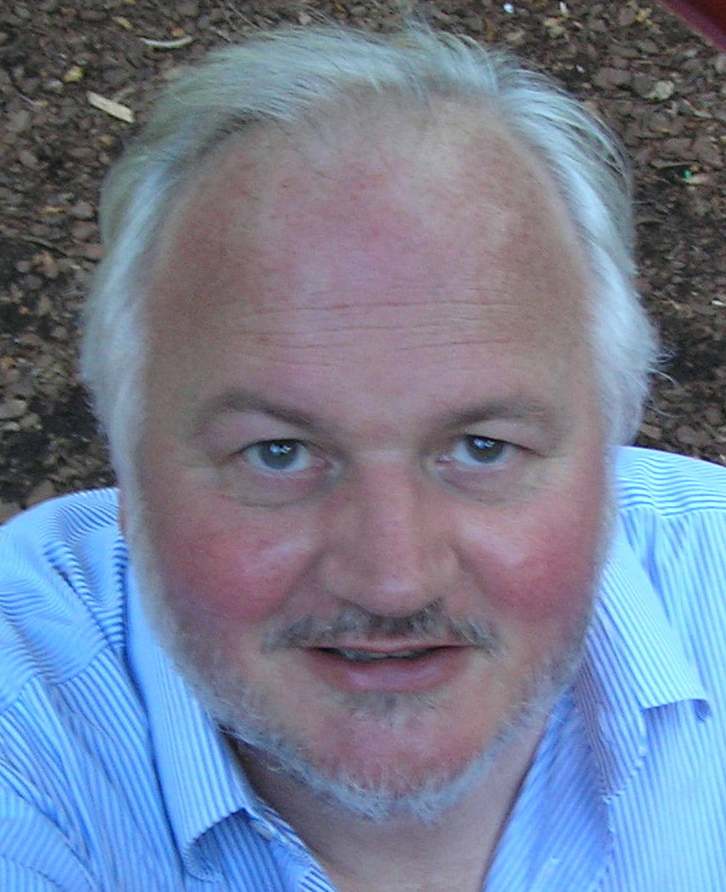

Personal details
- Born: 8 November 1951 (age 74) Middlesbrough, England
- Occupation: Writer, broadcaster & academic
- Website: paulvallely.com

Paul Vallely is a British writer on religion, ethics, Africa and development issues.

He is a Senior Fellow at the Global Development Institute at the University of Manchester and is a lay Ecumenical Canon of the Anglican Manchester Cathedral and a member of the Cathedral Council. He was visiting professor in Public Ethics at the University of Chester until 2019. He is a member of the Independent Commission into the Experience of Victims and Long-Term Prisoners chaired by the former Bishop of Liverpool, Rt Rev James Jones. He writes for The Guardian, Sunday Times and The Church Times.

His biography Pope Francis - Untying the Knots, published by Bloomsbury Publishing in 2013, has been translated into four other languages. It was greatly expanded in 2015, with nine additional chapters on the inner workings of the current papacy, as Pope Francis: The Struggle for the Soul of Catholicism. His latest book is a 750-page study of Philanthropy titled Philanthropy – from Aristotle to Zuckerberg.

== Career ==
Vallely was correspondent for The Times in Ethiopia during the great famine of 1984/85. He was commended as International Reporter of the Year for his reports which Bob Geldof described as "vivid, intelligent, moving and brave". Vallely was one of the few correspondents to leave the easy air routes to the feeding camps and strike off across country to find out what was really going on, according to Paddy Coulter, then Head of Media for the aid agency Oxfam. He uncovered a number of scandals the Marxist government were trying to keep hidden, was pronounced "an enemy of the revolution", arrested by the secret police and expelled from the country. He subsequently reported from across Africa, and elsewhere, covering wars and events in 30 different countries across the globe. In 1985 Vallely travelled with Bob Geldof across Africa to decide how to spend the £150m raised by Live Aid. He later ghost-wrote Geldof's autobiography, Is That It?.

He has worked for many British national newspapers including The Times, The Daily Telegraph, Sunday Correspondent, The Sunday Times (where he edited the News Review section), Independent on Sunday (where he was executive editor and then a weekly columnist) and The Independent where he was a leader-writer. Until April 2013 he was associate editor of The Independent. He still writes about ethical, cultural and political issues in the Independent on Sunday. (He was once referred to by Peter Wilby in New Statesman as The Independent's "resident saint"). He is also a columnist for The Church Times. He is a director and trustee of The Tablet the second-oldest surviving weekly journal in Britain. As a freelance he has written for The Independent, Sunday Times, the Guardian, the New York Times, the Church Times and Tablet magazine.

He is a Senior Research Fellow at the Global Development Institute, University of Manchester.

=== Books and writing ===
==== Writing on Africa ====
Vallely returned from covering the famine in Ethiopia in 1985 and wrote a book entitled Bad Samaritans – First World Ethics and Third World Debt (1990). The book set out to show that change was both a moral imperative and also in the self-interest of the rich nations. The book was described by Jonathan Porritt as "required reading for atheistic economists, economically ill-at-ease theologians and any thinking person in between". In it Vallely first floated the idea that the biblical concept of Jubilee could be applied to the forgiveness of the debt of developing nations and coined the phrase "from charity to justice" to describe the change that was required in relations between the rich and the poor. The slogan was taken up by campaigners from Jubilee 2000 to Make Poverty History and Live 8. Bob Geldof paid tribute to Vallely's influence in a lecture to the Bar Human Rights Committee Lecture, St. Paul's Cathedral in which he said: "In his book Bad Samaritans of 1990 Paul Vallely wrote correctly: 'For all his skill as a populist Bob Geldof could not shift the agenda from one of charity to one of justice.' Well maybe after 20 years we've finally got there."

In 2004/05 Vallely was co-author of the report of the Commission for Africa set up by the British prime minister, Tony Blair, of which Bob Geldof was a member. Vallely has chaired or been active in a number of prominent UK aid agencies, including Traidcraft, the Catholic Institute for International Relations (CIIR, later known as Progressio), Christian Aid and CAFOD. He has been an adviser to the Catholic bishops of England and Wales and was the author of their reports "Catholic Social teaching and the Big Society" and A place of redemption: a Christian approach to punishment and prison. (Catholic Bishop's Conference of England & Wales, 2004).

==== Writing on Pope Francis ====
Paul Vallely's biography Pope Francis - Untying the Knots examined the allegations made against Pope Francis when he was Fr Jorge Mario Bergoglio, leader of the Jesuits in Argentina, during the "Dirty War" conducted by the Argentine military dictatorship in the 1970s and '80s. Vallely concluded that Bergoglio did not actively betray two Jesuit priests, Franz Jalics and Orlando Yorio, into the hands of a military death squad, as some critics had alleged. But he did conclude that with regard to the two priests "Bergoglio behaved recklessly and has been trying to atone for his behaviour ever since." "Vallely produces evidence to show that Bergoglio, in those years, did set up an escape route for those escaping the military death squads which saved a significant number of people."

The book was highly acclaimed by reviewers. The Sunday Times described it as "head and shoulders above" other biographies. The Guardian described it as "riveting" and "tough-minded analysis". The Tablet said: "read this book forget the rest". The Jesuit magazine America Magazine described it as "meticulous". Thinking Faith, the online journal of the British Jesuits, said it was "a stroke of genius" describing it as "a contemporary biography with the cadences of a film script". Reuters said: "Paul Vallely's Untying the Knots fills the gaps left by 'instant books' on Pope Francis". The Times Literary Supplement wrote that the book was "formidable". And The Economist said: "This book demonstrates that Pope Francis is a tougher, more complex figure than meets the eye. A turbulent life has given the pontiff a subtle sense of the realities of power, and the courage to act on it. Anybody who reads this book will eagerly await his next move."

Vallely's inaugural professorial lecture "How Pope Francis will change Catholic Social Teaching" was delivered at the University of Chester, in conjunction with the Chester Theological Society on 1 May 2015.

==== Writing on Philanthropy ====
Vallely's most recent work has been a six-year long study of the history of Western philanthropy, a survey of the subject from the Ancient Greeks and Hebrews to modern times. Philanthropy – from Aristotle to Zuckerberg examines the successes and failures of contemporary philanthropy, examines its claims and contradictions and asks whether philanthropy is compatible with modern democracy. It also consider the relationship of philanthropy to political power, the place of philanthropy in the global economy and the democratisation of philanthropy through crowdfunding and other new avenues. The book critiques the excessive utilitarianism of much modern philanthrocapitalism and explores alternative approaches in extended interviews with top philanthropists and leading thinkers – including Rabbi Lord Jonathan Sacks; Jonathan Ruffer; Naser Haghamed of the world's largest Muslim charity, Islamic Relief; John Studzinski, Archbishop Rowan Williams; Lord David Sainsbury; Bob Geldof; Sir Trevor Pears; Rajiv Shah president of the Rockefeller Foundation; Ian Linden, formerly of the Tony Blair Faith Foundation; Sir Richard Branson; Chris Oecshli of the now spent-out Atlantic Philanthropies; Professor Ngaire Woods, Dean of Oxford's Blavatnik School of Government; Patrick Gaspard, president of George Soros's Open Society Foundations; Baroness Eliza Manningham-Buller, chair of the Wellcome Foundation; and Sir Lenny Henry and Kevin Cahill of Comic Relief. The book has been well-received internationally with the Literary Review declaring it "as awesome in breadth as it is meticulous in detail". The New Yorker declared it a "highly readable survey" which "is helpful in framing the major questions about philanthropy". The book been described by the Wall Street Journal as "a chronicle every bit as encyclopaedic as the title suggests".

== Honours and awards ==
Vallely was created a Companion of St Michael and St George "for services to journalism and to the developing world" on 17 June 2006.

In 2008 he was shortlisted for the Orwell Prize, a major prize in Britain for political writing.

== Publications ==
- With Geldof in Africa (with David Blundy), 1985;
- Is That It? (with Bob Geldof), 1986;
- Bad Samaritans: First World Ethics and Third World Debt, 1990;
- Promised Lands: Stories of Power and Poverty in the Third World, 1992;
- Daniel and the Mischief Boy (for children), 1993;
- The New Politics: Catholic Social Teaching for the 21st century, 1999;
- The Church and the New Age, 2000;
- Live Aid DVD sleeve notes 2004;
- A Place of Redemption: A Christian approach to Punishment and Prison (ed), 2004;
- The Fifth Crusade: George Bush and the Christianisation of the war in Iraq, 2004;
- Our Common Interest: report of the Prime Minister’s Commission for Africa (co-author) 2005;
- Live 8 Official Programme notes 2005;
- Live 8 DVD sleeve notes 2005;
- Geldof in Africa (with Bob Geldof), 2005;
- Hello World: the official Live 8 Book, 2005;
- "New Labour and the New World Order" in Remoralising Britain, 2008.
- Catholic Social Teaching and the Big Society, 2011
- Pope Francis: Untying the Knots, 2013
- Pope Francis: The Struggle for the Soul of Catholicism 2015
- Philanthropy – from Aristotle to Zuckerberg 2020
- Live Aid - The Definitive 40-Year Story 2025
