= Mississippi Center for Public Policy =

American free-market conservative think tank

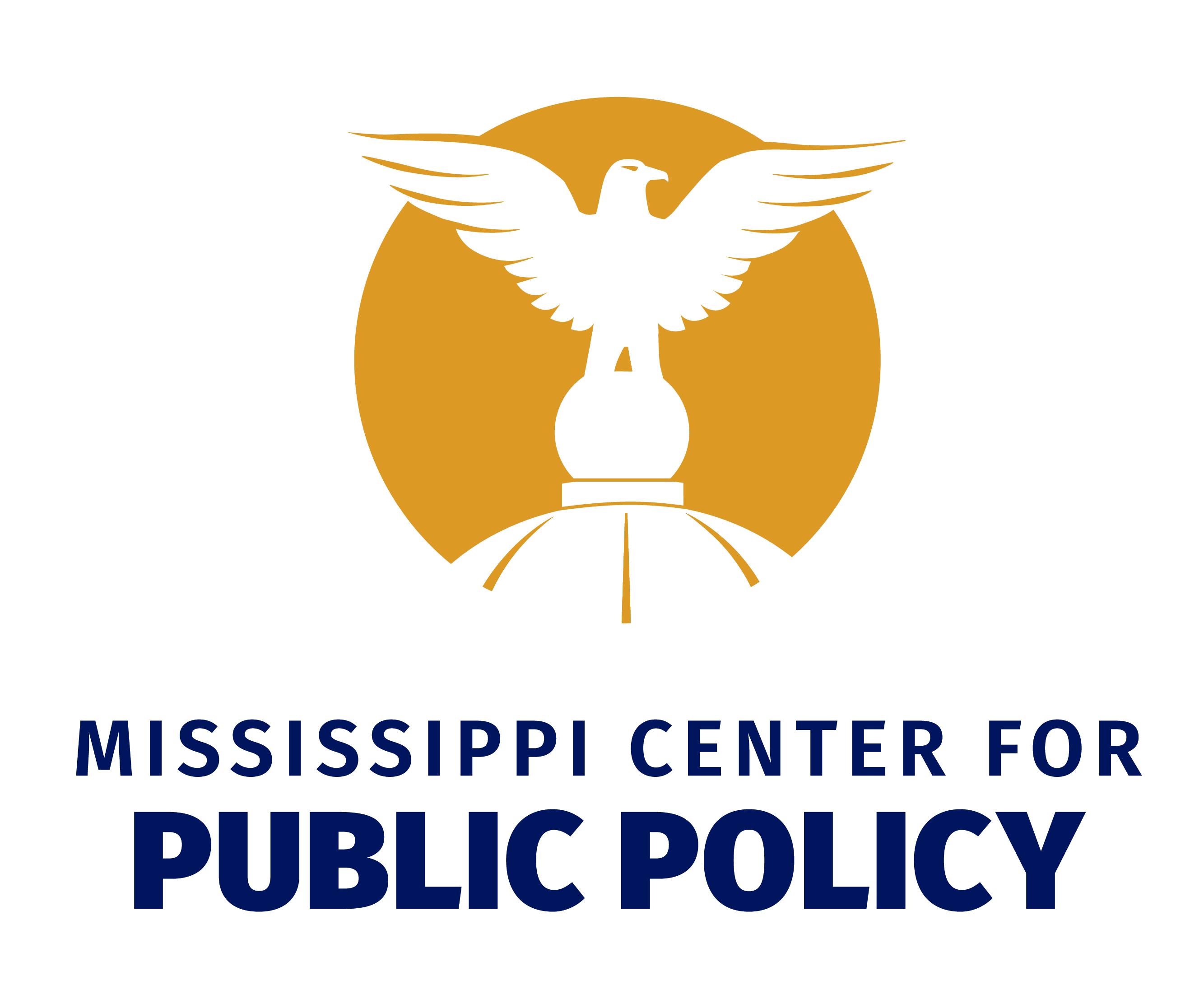
- Established: 1991
- President and CEO: Douglas Carswell
- Budget: Revenue: $763,000; Expenses: $842,000 (FYE September 2023)
- Subsidiaries: Mississippi Justice Institute
- Address: 520 George Street, Jackson, MS 39202
- Location: Jackson, Mississippi
- Website: www.mspolicy.org

The Mississippi Center for Public Policy (MCPP) is a free-market, conservative think tank located in Jackson, Mississippi. MCPP generally advocates for lower taxes, fewer government regulations, and free-market economics.

== Mississippi Justice Institute ==
The institute has a legal arm called the Mississippi Justice Institute.

In 2018, Aaron Rice became Director of the Mississippi Justice Institute. Former Directors include Shad White, who went on to become State Auditor of Mississippi, and D. Michael Hurst Jr., who became United States Attorney for the United States District Court for the Southern District of Mississippi.

In 2016, when the Southern Poverty Law Center filed a lawsuit challenging the constitutionality of Mississippi's public charter schools, the Mississippi Justice Institute intervened on behalf of parents whose children attend these charter schools. In 2019, the Supreme Court of Mississippi ruled in favor of charter school students and MJI, allowing charter schools to continue to receive taxpayer funding.

The Mississippi Justice Institute has filed multiple lawsuits challenging occupational licensing laws. In 2016 they filed suit on behalf of a taxicab driver and an Uber driver in Jackson, Mississippi, comparing the city's regulations on taxi cab companies to Jim Crow laws. In 2019, Mississippi Justice Institute sued the Mississippi Department of Cosmetology on behalf of Dipa Bhattarai, an eyebrow threader whose business was closed because she did not have the required occupational license. In 2020, MJI sued the Mississippi Department of Health on behalf of Donna Harris who was providing weight loss advice for clients. The state argued that she could not do that because she wasn't a registered dietician.

In the spring of 2020, the Mississippi Justice Institute filed two lawsuits against two mayors concerning COVID-19 pandemic related restrictions. Mississippi Justice Institute sued the city of Jackson, Mississippi after Mayor Chokwe Antar Lumumba issued an executive order restricting the right to openly carry a firearm because of the pandemic. A consent decree prohibits the city from attempting to restrict open carry again. MJI also sued the city of Greenville, Mississippi over an order prohibiting drive-in church services in the city.

In January 2021, Douglas Carswell was appointed as the president and CEO.

== Publications ==
- The High Road to Freedom (2019) - MCPP's policy recommendations.
