= Giles Foden =

English author

- Born: Giles William Thomas Foden; 11 January 1967 (age 59); Warwickshire, England
- Education: Yarlet Hall; Malvern College; Fitzwilliam College, Cambridge; St John's College, Cambridge
- Occupations: Writer; Professor of Creative Writing at the University of East Anglia
- Notable work: The Last King of Scotland (1998)
- Awards: Whitbread First Novel Award; Betty Trask Award; Somerset Maugham Award; Winifred Holtby Memorial Prize

Giles Foden (born 11 January 1967) is an English author, best known for his novel The Last King of Scotland (1998).

== Biography ==
Malvern College

Giles William Thomas Foden was born in Warwickshire in 1967, the son of Jonathan, an agricultural adviser, and Mary, a farmer. On his grandfather's death, the family sold their farm and in 1972 moved to Malawi in south-eastern Africa. Foden was educated at Yarlet Hall and Malvern College boarding schools, then at Fitzwilliam College, Cambridge, where he read English, and at St John's College, Cambridge.

Foden first worked as a journalist for Media Week magazine. He later became an assistant editor on The Times Literary Supplement and, between 1995 and 2006, was deputy literary editor at The Guardian. Formerly a Fellow in Creative and Performing Arts at Royal Holloway, University of London, and now Professor of Creative Writing at the University of East Anglia, he continues to contribute to The Guardian and other periodicals.

Foden's first novel, The Last King of Scotland (1998), is set during Idi Amin's rule of Uganda in the 1970s. It won the Whitbread First Novel Award, a Somerset Maugham Award, a Betty Trask Award and the Winifred Holtby Memorial Prize. The feature film, The Last King of Scotland (2006), starring Forest Whitaker, is based on Foden's novel with considerable differences, and Foden himself makes a brief cameo as a journalist at one of Amin's press conferences. His second novel, Ladysmith (1999), is set during the Anglo-Boer War in 1899 and tells the story of a young woman, Bella Kiernan, who becomes caught up in the Siege of Ladysmith. The book was inspired by letters written by Foden's great-grandfather, Arthur Foden, a British soldier in the Imperial Yeomanry in South Africa during the conflict.

Giles Foden edited The Guardian Century (1999), a collection of the best reportage and feature-writing published in the newspaper during the twentieth century, and he contributed a short story to The Weekenders: Travels in the Heart of Africa, a collection of short fiction set in Africa by various contemporary writers. Zanzibar (2002), is set in east Africa and explores the events surrounding the bombings of American embassies in 1998. Mimi and Toutou Go Forth: The Bizarre Battle for Lake Tanganyika, was published in 2004.

In 2009, he published his fourth novel, Turbulence, about the Weather forecasting for Operation Overlord. The same year he donated the short story "(One Last) Throw of the Dice" to Oxfam's Ox-Tales project, four collections of UK stories written by 38 authors. Foden's story was published in the Water collection. His latest book, Turbulence, is a novel about the military interest in meteorology in the Second World War.

== Selected bibliography ==
- 1998: The Last King of Scotland
- 1999: Ladysmith
- 2002: Zanzibar
- 2004: Mimi and Toutou Go Forth: The Bizarre Battle for Lake Tanganyika
- 2009: Turbulence

== Awards and prizes ==
- 1998: James Tait Black Memorial Prize (for fiction) (shortlist) for The Last King of Scotland
- 1998: Whitbread First Novel Award for The Last King of Scotland
- 1999: Betty Trask Award for The Last King of Scotland
- 1999: Somerset Maugham Award for The Last King of Scotland
- 1999: Winifred Holtby Memorial Prize for The Last King of Scotland
