= 2020 United States state legislative elections =

- November 3, 2020

86 legislative chambers 44 states
Party	Republican	Democratic	Coalition
Chambers before	59	39	1 (Note: The Alaska House of Representatives is controlled by a coalition of Democrats, Republicans, and independents. The minority caucus consists of Republicans who are not part of the majority coalition.)
Chambers after	61	37	1
Overall change	▲2	▼2	Steady
- Map of upper house elections: Democrats retained control Republicans gained control Republicans retained control Non-partisan legislature No regularly-scheduled elections

- Map of lower house elections: Democrats retained control Republicans gained control Republicans retained control Coalition retained control Non-partisan legislature No regularly-scheduled elections

The 2020 United States state legislative elections were held on November 3, 2020, for 86 state legislative chambers in 44 states. Across the fifty states, approximately 65 percent of all upper house seats and 85 percent of all lower house seats were up for election. Nine legislative chambers in the five permanently inhabited U.S. territories and the federal district of Washington, D.C. also held elections. The elections took place concurrently with several other federal, state, and local elections, including the presidential election, U.S. Senate elections, U.S. House elections, and gubernatorial elections.

Prior to the elections, Democrats held 15 trifectas (control of the governor's office and legislative chambers), Republicans held 21 trifectas, and 14 states have a divided government. Nationwide, Republicans controlled approximately 60 percent of the legislative chambers and 52 percent of the legislative seats. These elections had a major impact on the 2020 redistricting cycle, as many states held their final legislative elections prior to the decennial drawing of new congressional and state legislative districts.

Following the election, Republicans controlled redistricting in 20 state governments, totaling 188 House districts, whereas Democrats had control in states with a total of 73 districts. Overall, these elections saw the fewest partisan changes in state legislatures since 1944.

== Summary table ==
Regularly scheduled elections were held in 86 of the 99 state legislative chambers in the United States. Nationwide, regularly scheduled elections were held for 5,876 of the 7,383 legislative seats. Many legislative chambers held elections for all seats, but some legislative chambers that use staggered elections held elections for only a portion of the total seats in the chamber. The chambers not up for election either hold regularly scheduled elections in odd-numbered years, or have four-year terms and hold all regularly scheduled elections in presidential midterm election years.

Note that this table only covers regularly scheduled elections; additional special elections took place concurrently with these regularly scheduled elections.

State	Upper House				Lower House			
State	Seats up	Total	% up	Term	Seats up	Total	% up	Term
Alabama	0	35	0	4	0	105	0	4
Alaska	10	20	50	4	40	40	100	2
Arizona	30	30	100	2	60	60	100	2
Arkansas	17	35	49	2/4 (Note: The upper houses of Arkansas, Delaware, Florida, Hawaii, Illinois, Minnesota, New Jersey, and Texas use a 2-4-4 term length system.)	100	100	100	2
California	20	40	50	4	80	80	100	2
Colorado	18	35	51	4	65	65	100	2
Connecticut	36	36	100	2	151	151	100	2
Delaware	11	21	52	2/4	41	41	100	2
Florida	20	40	50	2/4	120	120	100	2
Georgia	56	56	100	2	180	180	100	2
Hawaii	13	25	52	2/4	51	51	100	2
Idaho	35	35	100	2	70	70	100	2
Illinois	20	59	34	2/4	118	118	100	2
Indiana	25	50	50	4	100	100	100	2
Iowa	25	50	50	4	100	100	100	2
Kansas	40	40	100	4	125	125	100	2
Kentucky	19	38	50	4	100	100	100	2
Louisiana	0	39	0	4	0	105	0	4
Maine	35	35	100	2	151	151	100	2
Maryland	0	47	0	4	0	141	0	4
Massachusetts	40	40	100	2	160	160	100	2
Michigan	0	38	0	4	110	110	100	2
Minnesota	67	67	100	2/4	134	134	100	2
Mississippi	0	52	0	4	0	122	0	4
Missouri	17	34	50	4	163	163	100	2
Montana	25	50	50	4	100	100	100	2
Nebraska	25 (Note: These figures represent the seats of Nebraska's unicameral legislature.)	49	51	4	N/A (unicameral)			
Nevada	10	21	48	4	42	42	100	2
New Hampshire	24	24	100	2	400	400	100	2
New Jersey	0	40	0	2/4	0	80	0	2
New Mexico	42	42	100	4	70	70	100	2
New York	63	63	100	2	150	150	100	2
North Carolina	50	50	100	2	120	120	100	2
North Dakota	23	47	49	4	47	94	50	4
Ohio	16	33	48	4	99	99	100	2
Oklahoma	24	48	50	4	101	101	100	2
Oregon	15	30	50	4	60	60	100	2
Pennsylvania	25	50	50	4	203	203	100	2
Rhode Island	38	38	100	2	75	75	100	2
South Carolina	46	46	100	4	124	124	100	2
South Dakota	35	35	100	2	70	70	100	2
Tennessee	16	33	48	4	99	99	100	2
Texas	16	31	52	2/4	150	150	100	2
Utah	15	29	52	4	75	75	100	2
Vermont	30	30	100	2	150	150	100	2
Virginia	0	40	0	4	0	100	0	2
Washington	25	49	51	4	98	98	100	2
West Virginia	17	34	50	4	100	100	100	2
Wisconsin	16	33	48	4	99	99	100	2
Wyoming	15	30	50	4	60	60	100	2
Total	1281	1972	65	N/A	4595	5411	85	N/A

== Electoral predictions ==
Louis Jacobson of The Cook Political Report predicted that Republican-held chambers that could potentially flip to Democratic control included both chambers in Arizona, the Florida Senate, both chambers in Georgia, the Iowa House, the Michigan House, the Minnesota Senate, both chambers in North Carolina, both chambers in Pennsylvania, and the Texas House. He predicted that Republicans could potentially gain control of the Maine Senate, the Minnesota House, and both chambers in New Hampshire, all of which were controlled by the Democratic Party. Additionally, Jacobson predicted that Republicans could win control of the Alaska House, which was currently controlled by a coalition of Democrats and Republicans.

Writing for Sabato's Crystal Ball, Chaz Nuttycombe highlighted the Alaska House and the New Hampshire Senate as the top pick-up opportunities for Republicans, and lists the Arizona House, the Arizona Senate, the Iowa House, the Michigan House, the Minnesota Senate, the North Carolina House, the North Carolina Senate, the Pennsylvania House, and the Texas House as the top pick-up opportunities for Democrats.

Most election predictors use:

- "Tossup": No advantage
- "Tilt": Advantage that is not quite as strong as "lean"
- "Lean": Slight advantage
- "Likely": Significant, but surmountable, advantage
- "Safe" or "Solid": Near-certain chance of victory

State	PVI	Chamber	Last election	Sabato May 7, 2020	Cook Nov. 2, 2020	Result
Alaska	R+9	Senate	R 13–7	Safe R	Lean R	R 13–7
Alaska	R+9	House of Representatives	Coal. 23–15–2	Tossup	Lean R (flip)	Coal. 21–17–2
Arizona	R+5	Senate	R 17–13	Tilt R	Tossup	R 16–14
Arizona	R+5	House of Representatives	R 31–29	Tilt R	Lean D (flip)	R 31–29
Arkansas	R+15	Senate	R 26–9	Safe R	Solid R	R 28–7
Arkansas	R+15	House of Representatives	R 76–24	Safe R	Solid R	R 78–22
California	D+12	State Senate	D 29–11	Safe D	Solid D	D 31–9
California	D+12	State Assembly	D 61–18–1	Safe D	Solid D	D 60–19–1
Colorado	D+1	Senate	D 19–16	Safe D	Likely D	D 20–15
Colorado	D+1	House of Representatives	D 41–24	Safe D	Solid D	D 41–24
Connecticut	D+6	State Senate	D 22–14	Likely D	Solid D	D 24–12
Connecticut	D+6	House of Representatives	D 97–54	Safe D	Solid D	D 97–54
Delaware	D+6	Senate	D 12–9	Safe D	Likely D	D 14–7
Delaware	D+6	House of Representatives	D 26–15	Safe D	Solid D	D 26–15
Florida	R+2	Senate	R 23–17	Safe R	Lean R	R 24–16
Florida	R+2	House of Representatives	R 73–47	Likely R	Likely R	R 78–42
Georgia	R+5	State Senate	R 35–21	Safe R	Lean R	R 34–22
Georgia	R+5	House of Representatives	R 105–75	Safe R	Lean R	R 103–77
Hawaii	D+18	Senate	D 24–1	Safe D	Solid D	D 24–1
Hawaii	D+18	House of Representatives	D 46–5	Safe D	Solid D	D 47–4
Idaho	R+19	Senate	R 28–7	Safe R	Solid R	R 28–7
Idaho	R+19	House of Representatives	R 56–14	Safe R	Solid R	R 58–12
Illinois	D+7	Senate	D 40–19	Safe D	Solid D	D 41–18
Illinois	D+7	House of Representatives	D 74–44	Safe D	Solid D	D 73–45
Indiana	R+9	Senate	R 40–10	Safe R	Solid R	R 39–11
Indiana	R+9	House of Representatives	R 67–33	Safe R	Solid R	R 71–29
Iowa	R+3	Senate	R 32–18	Safe R	Likely R	R 32–18
Iowa	R+3	House of Representatives	R 53–47	Tossup	Tossup	R 59–41
Kansas	R+13	Senate	R 31–9	Safe R	Likely R	R 29–11
Kansas	R+13	House of Representatives	R 84–41	Safe R	Likely R	R 86–39
Kentucky	R+15	Senate	R 28–10	Safe R	Solid R	R 30–8
Kentucky	R+15	House of Representatives	R 61–39	Safe R	Solid R	R 75–25
Maine	D+3	Senate	D 21–14	Likely D	Lean D	D 22–13
Maine	D+3	House of Representatives	D 89–56–6	Likely D	Likely D	D 80–67–4
Massachusetts	D+12	Senate	D 34–6	Safe D	Solid D	D 37–3
Massachusetts	D+12	House of Representatives	D 127–32–1	Safe D	Solid D	D 129–30–1
Michigan	D+1	House of Representatives	R 58–52	Lean R	Tossup	R 58–52
Minnesota	D+1	Senate	R 35–32	Tossup	Tossup	R 34–33
Minnesota	D+1	House of Representatives	D 75–59	Likely D	Lean D	D 70–64
Missouri	R+9	Senate	R 23–10	Safe R	Likely R	R 23–10
Missouri	R+9	House of Representatives	R 116–47	Safe R	Likely R	R 114–49
Montana	R+11	Senate	R 30–20	Safe R	Solid R	R 31–19
Montana	R+11	House of Representatives	R 58–42	Safe R	Solid R	R 67–33
Nevada	D+1	Senate	D 13–8	Safe D	Likely D	D 12–9
Nevada	D+1	Assembly	D 29–13	Safe D	Likely D	D 26–16
New Hampshire	D+1	Senate	D 14–10	Lean D	Lean D	R 14–10
New Hampshire	D+1	House of Representatives	D 234–166	Likely D	Lean D	R 213–187
New Mexico	D+3	Senate	D 26–16	Likely D	Solid D	D 27–15
New Mexico	D+3	House of Representatives	D 46–24	Likely D	Solid D	D 44–25–1
New York	D+11	State Senate	D 40–23	Likely D	Solid D	D 43–20
New York	D+11	State Assembly	D 105–44–1	Safe D	Solid D	D 105–43–1–1
North Carolina	R+3	Senate	R 29–21	Likely R	Tossup	R 28–22
North Carolina	R+3	House of Representatives	R 65–55	Likely R	Lean R	R 69–51
North Dakota	R+16	Senate	R 37–10	Safe R	Solid R	R 40–7
North Dakota	R+16	House of Representatives	R 79–15	Safe R	Solid R	R 80–14
Ohio	R+3	Senate	R 24–9	Safe R	Likely R	R 25–8
Ohio	R+3	House of Representatives	R 61–38	Safe R	Likely R	R 64–35
Oklahoma	R+20	Senate	R 38–9	Safe R	Solid R	R 38–9
Oklahoma	R+20	House of Representatives	R 77–23	Safe R	Solid R	R 82–19
Oregon	D+5	State Senate	D 18–12	Safe D	Likely D	D 18–12
Oregon	D+5	House of Representatives	D 38–22	Safe D	Likely D	D 37–23
Pennsylvania	EVEN	State Senate	R 28–21–1	Safe R	Lean R	R 28–21–1
Pennsylvania	EVEN	House of Representatives	R 110–93	Lean R	Tossup	R 113–90
Rhode Island	D+10	Senate	D 33–5	Safe D	Solid D	D 33–5
Rhode Island	D+10	House of Representatives	D 66–9	Safe D	Solid D	D 65–10
South Carolina	R+8	Senate	R 27–19	Safe R	Solid R	R 30–16
South Carolina	R+8	House of Representatives	R 80–44	Safe R	Solid R	R 81–43
South Dakota	R+14	Senate	R 30–5	Safe R	Solid R	R 32–3
South Dakota	R+14	House of Representatives	R 59–11	Safe R	Solid R	R 62–8
Tennessee	R+14	Senate	R 28–5	Safe R	Solid R	R 27–6
Tennessee	R+14	House of Representatives	R 73–26	Safe R	Solid R	R 73–26
Texas	R+8	Senate	R 19–12	Safe R	Likely R	R 18–13
Texas	R+8	House of Representatives	R 83–67	Lean R	Tossup	R 83–67
Utah	R+20	State Senate	R 23–6	Safe R	Solid R	R 23–6
Utah	R+20	House of Representatives	R 59–16	Safe R	Solid R	R 58–17
Vermont	D+15	Senate	D 22–6–2	Safe D	Solid D	D 21–7–2
Vermont	D+15	House of Representatives	D 95–43–7–5	Safe D	Solid D	D 92–46–7–5
Washington	D+7	State Senate	D 28–21	Safe D	Likely D	D 28–21
Washington	D+7	House of Representatives	D 57–41	Safe D	Solid D	D 57–41
West Virginia	R+19	Senate	R 20–14	Safe R	Likely R	R 23–11
West Virginia	R+19	House of Delegates	R 59–41	Safe R	Solid R	R 76–24
Wisconsin	EVEN	Senate	R 19–14	Safe R	Likely R	R 21–12
Wisconsin	EVEN	State Assembly	R 63–34	Safe R	Likely R	R 61–38
Wyoming	R+25	Senate	R 27–3	Safe R	Solid R	R 28–2
Wyoming	R+25	House of Representatives	R 50–9–1	Safe R	Solid R	R 51–7–1–1

== National results ==
Lower house results by party
Party	Seats before (Note: Counts seats that were vacant prior to the election towards the party that last held them)	Chambers before	Popular vote	%	Seats after	+/-	Chambers after	+/-
Republican	2,780	28	65,005,945	48.78%	2,926	▲146	29	▼1
Democratic	2,600	20	65,716,359	49.32%	2,454	▼146	19	▲1
Independent	23	0	665,710	0.50%	22	▼1	0	Steady
Progressive	7	0	20,362	0.02%	7	Steady	0	Steady
Libertarian	0	0	680,373	0.51%	1	▲1	0	Steady
Independence	1	0	109,184	0.08%	1	Steady	0	Steady
Green	0	0	108,405	0.08%	0	Steady	0	Steady
Others	0	1 (Note: The Alaska House of Representatives prior to the 2022 elections was controlled by a coalition of 15 Democrats, 2 Republicans, and 4 Independents.)	951,992	0.71%	0	Steady	1 (Note: The Alaska House of Representatives following the 2022 elections is controlled by a coalition of 19 Republicans, 2 Democrats, and 2 Independents.)	Steady
Total	5,411	49	133,258,330	100.00%	5,411	—	49	—

Upper house results by party (Note: Counts seats in the officially nonpartisan Nebraska legislature towards the party that endorsed each candidate)
Party	Seats before	Chambers before	Popular vote	%	Seats after	+/-	Chambers after	+/-
Republican	1,092	31	38,466,738	47.22%	1,097	▲5	32	▲1
Democratic	876	19	41,103,188	50.46%	872	▼4	18	▼1
Progressive	2	0	83,975	0.10%	2	Steady	0	Steady
Independent	2	0	336,876	0.41%	1	▼1	0	Steady
Libertarian	0	0	321,959	0.40%	0	Steady	0	Steady
Independence	0	0	120,546	0.15%	0	Steady	0	Steady
Green	0	0	82,860	0.10%	0	Steady	0	Steady
Others	0	0	942,801	1.16%	0	Steady	0	Steady
Total	1,972	50	81,458,943	100.00%	1,972	—	50	—

Due to the impact the redistricting cycle will have on partisan control of Congress and state legislatures, the Democrats, who had not been in control of a majority of state legislatures across the U.S. since 2010, had hoped to retake control of key chambers in advance. However, despite fundraising efforts and projections of several Republican-held chambers in competitive states flipping, the Democrats failed to flip any state chambers, which they attributed to gerrymandering in the wake of the 2010 elections, as well as state laws restricting voting, President Donald Trump being on the ballot, and the Democrats' campaigning methods. Instead, Republicans flipped both chambers in the New Hampshire General Court.

== Maps ==
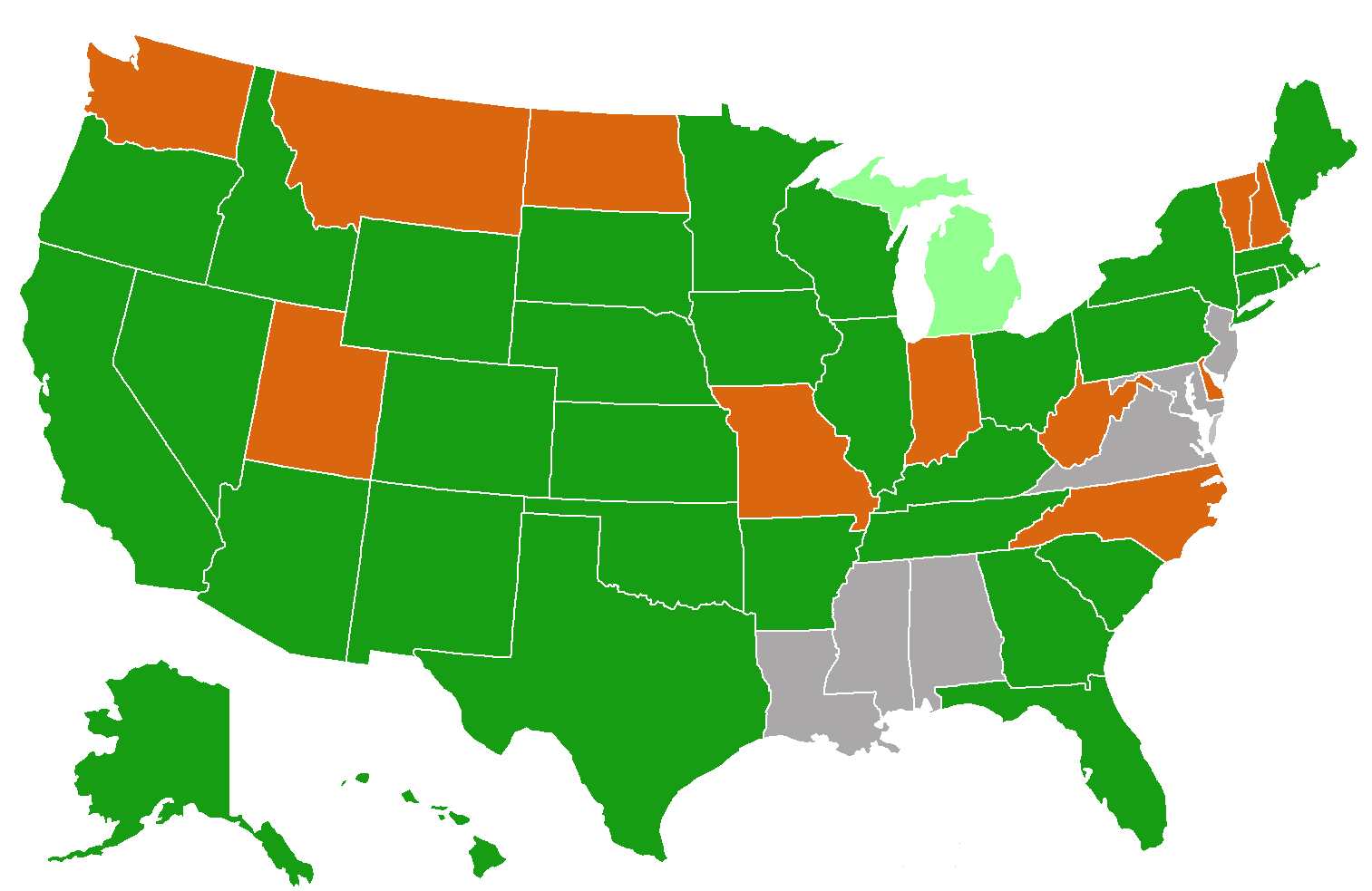
States holding regularly scheduled legislative and gubernatorial elections in 2020:
Governor and all legislative chambers
All legislative chambers
A portion of legislative chambers
None

Partisan control of state and territorial governments following the 2020 elections:
Democratic trifecta maintained
Republican trifecta maintained
Republican trifecta established
Divided government established
Divided government maintained
Officially non-partisan legislature

Upper house seats by party holding majority in each state
Republican 50–60% 60–70% 70–80% 80–90% 90–100%	Democratic 50–60% 60–70% 70–80% 80–90% 90–100%

Lower house seats by party holding majority in each state
Republican 50–60% 60–70% 70–80% 80–90%	Democratic 50–60% 60–70% 70–80% 80–90% 90–100%

Net changes to upper house seats after the 2020 elections
+1 Rep seat +2 Rep seats +3–4 Rep seats
+1 Dem seat +2 Dem seats +4 Dem seats

Net changes to lower house seats after the 2020 elections
+1 Rep seat +2 Rep seats +3–5 Rep seats
+6–14 Rep seats +18 Rep seats +47 Rep seats
+1 Dem seat +2 Dem seats
+1 Lib seat +2 Ind seats

== State summaries ==
=== Alaska ===
Senate results

House of Representatives results

Half of the seats of the Alaska Senate and all of the seats of the Alaska House of Representatives were up for election in 2020. The Alaska Senate is controlled by Republicans, while the Alaska House of Representatives is controlled by a coalition of Democrats, Republicans, and independents. The Alaska House of Representatives is currently the only state legislative chamber controlled by a cross-partisan coalition.

Alaska Senate
Party	Leader	Before	After	Change
Republican	Lyman Hoffman (Note: Hoffman led and caucused with the Republican majority despite being a Democrat himself.)	13	13	Steady
Democratic	Lyman Hoffman	1	1	Steady
Democratic	Tom Begich	6	6	Steady
Total		20	20	

Alaska House of Representatives
Party	Leader	Before	After	Change
Democratic	Bryce Edgmon	15 (Note: Coalition consisted of 15 Democrats, 5 Republicans, and 2 Independents.)	15 (Note: Coalition consisted of 15 Democrats, 2 Republicans, and 4 Independents.)	Steady
Independent	Bryce Edgmon	2	4	▲2
Republican	Lance Pruitt	6	2	▼3
Republican	Lance Pruitt	16	17	▼3
Independent; Republican		1	2	▲1
Total		40	40	

=== Arizona ===
Senate results

House of Representatives results

All of the seats of the Arizona Senate and the Arizona House of Representatives were up for election in 2020. Republicans have a government trifecta with control of the governorship and both state legislative chambers.

Arizona Senate
Party	Leader	Before	After	Change
Republican	Rick Gray	17	16	▼1
Democratic	David Bradley	13	14	▲1
Total		30	30	

Arizona House of Representatives
Party	Leader	Before	After	Change
Republican	Russell Bowers	31	31	Steady
Democratic	Charlene Fernandez	29	29	Steady
Total		60	60	

=== Arkansas ===
Half of the seats of the Arkansas Senate and all of the seats of the Arkansas House of Representatives were up for election in 2020. Republicans held control of both chambers, maintaining a government trifecta.

Arkansas Senate
Party	Leader	Before	After	Change
Republican	Bart Hester	26	28	▲2
Democratic	Keith Ingram	9	7	▼2
Total		35	35	

Arkansas House of Representatives
Party	Leader	Before	After	Change
Republican	Matthew Shepherd	76	78	▲2
Democratic	Fredrick Love	24	22	▼2
Total		100	100	

=== California ===
State Senate results

State Assembly results

Half of the seats of the California State Senate and all of the seats of the California State Assembly were up for election in 2020. Democrats held control of both chambers, maintaining a government trifecta.

California State Senate
Party	Leader	Before	After	Change
Democratic	Toni Atkins	29	31	▲2
Republican	Shannon Grove	11	9	▼2
Total		40	40	

California State Assembly
Party	Leader	Before	After	Change
Democratic	Anthony Rendon	61	60	▼1
Republican	Marie Waldron	18	19	▲1
Independent		1	1	Steady
Total		80	80	

=== Colorado ===
Senate results

House of Representatives results

Half of the seats of the Colorado Senate and all of the seats of the Colorado House of Representatives were up for election in 2020. Democrats held control of both chambers, maintaining a government trifecta.

Colorado Senate
Party	Leader	Before	After	Change
Democratic	Leroy Garcia	19	20	▲1
Republican	Chris Holbert	16	15	▼1
Total		35	35	

Colorado House of Representatives
Party	Leader	Before	After	Change
Democratic	KC Becker	41	41	Steady
Republican	Patrick Neville	24	24	Steady
Total		65	65	

=== Connecticut ===
Senate results

House of Representatives results

All of the seats of the Connecticut State Senate and the Connecticut House of Representatives were up for election in 2020. Democrats held control of both chambers, maintaining a government trifecta.

Connecticut State Senate
Party	Leader	Before	After	Change
Democratic	Martin Looney	22	24	▲2
Republican	Len Fasano	14	12	▼2
Total		36	36	

Connecticut House of Representatives
Party	Leader	Before	After	Change
Democratic	Matthew Ritter	97	97	Steady
Republican	Themis Klarides	54	54	Steady
Total	151	151		

=== Delaware ===
Senate results

House of Representatives results

Half of the seats of the Delaware Senate and all of the seats of the Delaware House of Representatives were up for election in 2020. Democrats held control of both chambers, maintaining a government trifecta.

Delaware Senate
Party	Leader	Before	After	Change
Democratic	David McBride	12	14	▲2
Republican	Gerald Hocker	9	7	▼2
Total		21	21	

Delaware House of Representatives
Party	Leader	Before	After	Change
Democratic	Peter Schwartzkopf	26	26	Steady
Republican	Daniel Short	15	15	Steady
Total		41	41	

=== Florida ===
Senate results

House of Representatives results

Half of the seats of the Florida Senate and all of the seats of the Florida House of Representatives were up for election in 2020. Republicans held control of both chambers, maintaining a government trifecta.

Florida Senate
Party	Leader	Before	After	Change
Republican	Kathleen Passidomo	23	24	▲1
Democratic	Audrey Gibson	17	16	▼1
Total		40	40	

Florida House of Representatives
Party	Leader	Before	After	Change
Republican	José R. Oliva	73	78	▲5
Democratic	Kionne McGhee	47	42	▼5
Total		120	120	

=== Georgia ===
Senate results

House of Representatives results

All of the seats of the Georgia State Senate and the Georgia House of Representatives were up for election in 2020. Republicans held control of both chambers, maintaining a government trifecta.

Georgia State Senate
Party	Leader	Before	After	Change
Republican	Butch Miller	35	34	▼1
Democratic	Steve Henson	21	22	▲1
Total		56	56	

Georgia House of Representatives
Party	Leader	Before	After	Change
Republican	David Ralston	105	103	▼2
Democratic	Bob Trammell	75	77	▲2
Total		180	180	

=== Hawaii ===
House of Representatives results

Half of the seats of the Hawaii Senate and all of the seats of the Hawaii House of Representatives were up for election in 2020. Democrats held control of both chambers, maintaining a government trifecta.

Hawaii Senate
Party	Leader	Before	After	Change
Democratic	Ron Kouchi	24	24	Steady
Republican	Kurt Fevella	1	1	Steady
Total		25	25	

Hawaii House of Representatives
Party	Leader	Before	After	Change
Democratic	Scott Saiki	46	47	▲1
Republican	Gene Ward	5	4	▼1
Total		51	51	

=== Idaho ===
Senate results

All of the seats of the Idaho Senate and the Idaho House of Representatives were up for election in 2020. Republicans held control of both chambers, maintaining a government trifecta.

Idaho Senate
Party	Leader	Before	After	Change
Republican	Chuck Winder	28	28	Steady
Democratic	Michelle Stennett	7	7	Steady
Total		35	35	

Idaho House of Representatives
Party	Leader	Before	After	Change
Republican	Scott Bedke	56	58	▲2
Democratic	Ilana Rubel	14	12	▼2
Total		70	70	

=== Illinois ===
Senate results

House of Representatives results

One third of the seats of the Illinois Senate and all of the seats of the Illinois House of Representatives were up for election in 2020. Democrats held control of both chambers, maintaining a government trifecta.

Illinois Senate
Party	Leader	Before	After	Change
Democratic	Don Harmon	40	41	▲1
Republican	Bill Brady	19	18	▼1
Total		59	59	

Illinois House of Representatives
Party	Leader	Before	After	Change
Democratic	Mike Madigan	74	73	▼1
Republican	Jim Durkin	44	45	▲1
Total		118	118	

=== Indiana ===
Half of the seats of the Indiana Senate and all of the seats of the Indiana House of Representatives were up for election in 2020. Republicans held control of both chambers, maintaining a government trifecta.

Indiana Senate
Party	Leader	Before	After	Change
Republican	Rodric Bray	40	39	▼1
Democratic	Greg Taylor	10	11	▲1
Total		50	50	

2020 Indiana House of Representatives Election

Indiana House of Representatives
Party	Leader	Before	After	Change
Republican	Todd Huston	67	71	▲4
Democratic	Phil GiaQuinta	33	29	▼4
Total		100	100	

=== Iowa ===
Senate results

House of Representatives results

Half of the seats of the Iowa Senate and all of the seats of the Iowa House of Representatives were up for election in 2020. Republicans held control of both chambers, maintaining a government trifecta.

Iowa Senate
Party	Leader	Before	After	Change
Republican	Charles Schneider	32	32	Steady
Democratic	Janet Petersen	18	18	Steady
Total		50	50	

Iowa House of Representatives
Party	Leader	Before	After	Change
Republican	Pat Grassley	53	59	▲6
Democratic	Todd Prichard	47	41	▼6
Total		100	100	

=== Kansas ===
Senate results

All of the seats of the Kansas Senate and the Kansas House of Representatives were up for election in 2020. Republicans held control of both chambers.

Kansas Senate
Party	Leader	Before	After	Change
Republican	Susan Wagle	29	29	Steady
Democratic	Anthony Hensley	11	11	Steady
Total		40	40	

Kansas House of Representatives
Party	Leader	Before	After	Change
Republican	Ron Ryckman Jr.	84	86	▲2
Democratic	Tom Sawyer	41	39	▼2
Total		125	125	

=== Kentucky ===
Half of the seats of the Kentucky Senate and all of the seats of the Kentucky House of Representatives were up for election in 2020. Republicans held control of both chambers. Because the Kentucky legislature can override gubernatorial vetoes with a simple majority vote, Republicans have a veto-proof majority in the state legislature.

Kentucky Senate
Party	Leader	Before	After	Change
Republican	Robert Stivers	28	30	▲2
Democratic	Morgan McGarvey	10	8	▼2
Total		38	38	

Kentucky House of Representatives
Party	Leader	Before	After	Change
Republican	David Osborne	61	75	▲14
Democratic	Joni Jenkins	39	25	▼14
Total		100	100	

=== Maine ===
All of the seats of the Maine Senate and the Maine House of Representatives were up for election in 2020. Democrats held control of both chambers, maintaining a government trifecta.

Maine Senate
Party	Leader	Before	After	Change
Democratic	Troy Jackson	21	22	▲1
Republican	Dana Dow	14	13	▼1
Total		35	35	

Maine House of Representatives
Party	Leader	Before	After	Change
Democratic	Sara Gideon	89	80	▼9
Republican	Kathleen Dillingham	57	67	▲10
Independent		5	4	▼1
Total		151	151	

=== Massachusetts ===
Senate results

All of the seats of the Massachusetts Senate and the Massachusetts House of Representatives were up for election in 2020. Democrats retained control of both chambers.

Massachusetts Senate
Party	Leader	Before	After	Change
Democratic	Karen Spilka	34	37	▲3
Republican	Bruce Tarr	6	3	▼3
Total		40	40	

Massachusetts House of Representatives
Party	Leader	Before	After	Change
Democratic	Robert DeLeo	127	129	▲2
Republican	Bradley Jones Jr.	32	30	▼2
Independent		1	1	Steady
Total		160	160	

=== Michigan ===
House of Representatives results

All of the seats of the Michigan House of Representatives were up for election in 2020. The Michigan Senate did not hold regularly scheduled elections in 2020. Republicans maintained control of the chamber.

Michigan House of Representatives
Party	Leader	Before	After	Change
Republican	Lee Chatfield	58	58	Steady
Democratic	Christine Greig	52	52	Steady
Total		110	110	

=== Minnesota ===
Senate results

House of Representatives results

All of the seats of the Minnesota Senate and the Minnesota House of Representatives were up for election in 2020. Republicans maintained control of the senate, while Democrats maintained control of the house of representatives.

Minnesota Senate
Party	Leader	Before	After	Change
Republican	Paul Gazelka	35	34	▼1
Democratic (DFL)	Susan Kent	32	33	▲1
Total		67	67	

Minnesota House of Representatives
Party	Leader	Before	After	Change
Democratic (DFL)	Melissa Hortman	75	70	▼5
Republican	Kurt Daudt	59	64	▲5
Total		134	134	

=== Missouri ===
Half of the seats of the Missouri Senate and all of the seats of the Missouri House of Representatives were up for election in 2020. Republicans held control of both chambers, maintaining a government trifecta.

Missouri Senate
Party	Leader	Before	After	Change
Republican	Caleb Rowden	24	24	Steady
Democratic	John Rizzo	10	10	Steady
Total		34	34	

Missouri House of Representatives
Party	Leader	Before	After	Change
Republican	Elijah Haahr	116	114	▼2
Democratic	Crystal Quade	47	49	▲2
Total		163	163	

=== Montana ===
Half of the seats of the Montana Senate and all of the seats of the Montana House of Representatives were up for election in 2020. Republicans held control of both chambers, and also gained a government trifecta by winning the gubernatorial election.

Montana Senate
Party	Leader	Before	After	Change
Republican	Fred Thomas	30	31	▲1
Democratic	Jon Sesso	20	19	▼1
Total		50	50	

Montana House of Representatives
Party	Leader	Before	After	Change
Republican	Greg Hertz	58	67	▲9
Democratic	Casey Schreiner	42	33	▼9
Total		100	100	

=== Nebraska ===
Nebraska is the only U.S. state with a unicameral legislature; half of the seats of the Nebraska Legislature were up for election in 2020. Nebraska is also unique in that its legislature is officially non-partisan and holds non-partisan elections, although the Democratic and Republican parties each endorse legislative candidates.

Nebraska Legislature
Party	Before	After	Change
Republican	30	32	▲2
Democratic	18	17	▼1
Independent	1	0	▼1
Total	49	49	

=== Nevada ===
Senate results

Half of the seats of the Nevada Senate and all of the seats of the Nevada Assembly were up for election in 2020. Democrats held control of both chambers, maintaining a government trifecta.

Nevada Senate
Party	Leader	Before	After	Change
Democratic	Nicole Cannizzaro	13	12	▼1
Republican	James Settelmeyer	8	9	▲1
Total		21	21	

Nevada Assembly
Party	Leader	Before	After	Change
Democratic	Jason Frierson	29	26	▼3
Republican	Robin L. Titus	13	16	▲3
Total		42	42	

=== New Hampshire ===
House of Representatives results

All of the seats of the New Hampshire Senate and the New Hampshire House of Representatives were up for election in 2020. Republicans gained control of both chambers, establishing a government trifecta.

New Hampshire Senate
Party	Leader	Before	After	Change
Republican	Chuck Morse	10	14	▲4
Democratic	Donna Soucy	14	10	▼4
Total		24	24	

New Hampshire House of Representatives
Party	Leader	Before	After	Change
Republican	Dick Hinch	166	213	▲47
Democratic	Steve Shurtleff	234	187	▼47
Total		400	400	

=== New Mexico ===
Senate results

All of the seats of the New Mexico Senate and the New Mexico House of Representatives were up for election in 2020. Democrats held control of both chambers, maintaining a government trifecta.

New Mexico Senate
Party	Leader	Before	After	Change
Democratic	Peter Wirth	26	27	▲1
Republican	Stuart Ingle	16	15	▼1
Total		42	42	

New Mexico House of Representatives
Party	Leader	Before	After	Change
Democratic	Brian Egolf	46	44	▼2
Republican	James G. Townsend	24	25	▲1
Independent		0	1	▲1
Total		70	70	

=== New York ===
State Senate results

State Assembly results

All of the seats of the New York State Senate and the New York State Assembly were up for election in 2020. Democrats held control of both chambers, maintaining a government trifecta.

New York State Senate
Party	Leader	Before	After	Change
Democratic	Andrea Stewart-Cousins	39	43	▲4
Republican	Rob Ortt	24	20	▼4
Total		63	63	

New York State Assembly
Party	Leader	Before	After	Change
Democratic	Carl Heastie	106	106 (Note: One Democratic Assemblywoman was forced to win re-election on the ballot line of a minor party due to paperowrk errors.)	Steady
Republican	William Barclay	43	43	Steady
Independence	Fred Thiele	1	1	Steady
Total		150	150	

=== North Carolina ===
Senate results

House of Representatives results

All of the seats of the North Carolina Senate and the North Carolina House of Representatives were up for election in 2020. Republicans retained control of both chambers.

North Carolina Senate
Party	Leader	Before	After	Change
Republican	Phil Berger	29	28	▼1
Democratic	Dan Blue	21	22	▲1
Total		50	50	

North Carolina House of Representatives
Party	Leader	Before	After	Change
Republican	Tim Moore	65	69	▲4
Democratic	Darren Jackson	55	51	▼4
Total		120	120	

=== North Dakota ===
Half of the seats of the North Dakota Senate and the North Dakota House of Representatives were up for election in 2020. Republicans retained control of both chambers, maintaining a government trifecta.

North Dakota Senate
Party	Leader	Before	After	Change
Republican	Rich Wardner	37	40	▲3
Democratic-NPL	Joan Heckaman	10	7	▼3
Total		47	47	

North Dakota House of Representatives
Party	Leader	Before	After	Change
Republican	Lawrence Klemin	79	80	▲1
Democratic-NPL	Joshua Boschee	15	14	▼1
Total		94	94	

=== Ohio ===
Senate results

House of Representatives results

Half of the seats of the Ohio Senate and all of the seats of the Ohio House of Representatives were up for election in 2020. Republicans retained control of both chambers, maintaining a government trifecta.

Ohio Senate
Party	Leader	Before	After	Change
Republican	Larry Obhof	24	25	▲1
Democratic	Kenny Yuko	9	8	▼1
Total		33	33	

Ohio House of Representatives
Party	Leader	Before	After	Change
Republican	Robert R. Cupp	61	64	▲3
Democratic	Emilia Sykes	38	35	▼3
Total		99	99	

=== Oklahoma ===
Half of the seats of the Oklahoma Senate and all of the seats of the Oklahoma House of Representatives were up for election in 2020. Republicans retained control of both chambers, maintaining a government trifecta.

Oklahoma Senate
Party	Leader	Before	After	Change
Republican	Greg Treat	39	39	Steady
Democratic	Kay Floyd	9	9	Steady
Total		48	48	

Oklahoma House of Representatives
Party	Leader	Before	After	Change
Republican	Charles McCall	77	82	▲5
Democratic	Emily Virgin	24	19	▼5
Total		101	101	

=== Oregon ===
Half of the seats of the Oregon State Senate and all of the seats of the Oregon House of Representatives were up for election in 2020. Democrats retained control of both chambers, maintaining a government trifecta.

Oregon State Senate
Party	Leader	Before	After	Change
Democratic	Rob Wagner	18	18	Steady
Republican	Herman Baertschiger Jr.	12	12	Steady
Total		30	30	

Oregon House of Representatives
Party	Leader	Before	After	Change
Democratic	Tina Kotek	38	37	▼1
Republican	Christine Drazan	22	23	▲1
Total		50	50	

=== Pennsylvania ===
State Senate results

House of Representatives results

Half of the seats of the Pennsylvania State Senate and all of the seats of the Pennsylvania House of Representatives were up for election in 2020. Republicans retained control of both chambers.

Pennsylvania State Senate
Party	Leader	Before	After	Change
Republican	Joe Scarnati	28	28	Steady
Democratic	Jay Costa	21	21	Steady
Independent		1	1	Steady
Total		50	50	

Pennsylvania House of Representatives
Party	Leader	Before	After	Change
Republican	Bryan Cutler	110	113	▲3
Democratic	Frank Dermody	93	90	▼3
Total		203	203	

=== Rhode Island ===
Senate results

All of the seats of the Rhode Island Senate and the Rhode Island House of Representatives were up for election in 2020. Democrats retained control of both chambers, maintaining a government trifecta.

Rhode Island Senate
Party	Leader	Before	After	Change
Democratic	Michael McCaffrey	33	33	Steady
Republican	Dennis Algiere	5	5	Steady
Total		38	38	

Rhode Island House of Representatives
Party	Leader	Before	After	Change
Democratic	Nicholas Mattiello	66	65	▼1
Republican	Blake Filippi	8	10	▲2
Independent		1	0	▼1
Total		75	75	

=== South Carolina ===
Senate results

House of Representatives results

All of the seats of the South Carolina Senate and the South Carolina House of Representatives were up for election in 2020. Republicans retained control of both chambers, maintaining a government trifecta.

South Carolina Senate
Party	Leader	Before	After	Change
Republican	Harvey S. Peeler Jr.	27	30	▲3
Democratic	Nikki G. Setzler	19	16	▼3
Total		46	46	

South Carolina House of Representatives
Party	Leader	Before	After	Change
Republican	Jay Lucas	79	81	▲2
Democratic	J. Todd Rutherford	45	43	▼2
Total		124	124	

=== South Dakota ===
All of the seats of the South Dakota Senate and the South Dakota House of Representatives were up for election in 2020. Republicans retained control of both chambers, maintaining a government trifecta.

South Dakota Senate
Party	Leader	Before	After	Change
Republican	Kris Langer	30	32	▲2
Democratic	Troy Heinert	5	3	▼2
Total		35	35	

South Dakota House of Representatives
Party	Leader	Before	After	Change
Republican	Steven Haugaard	59	62	▲3
Democratic	Jamie Smith	11	8	▼3
Total		70	70	

=== Tennessee ===
Senate results

House of Representatives results

Half of the seats of the Tennessee Senate and all of the seats of the Tennessee House of Representatives were up for election in 2020. Republicans retained control of both chambers, maintaining a government trifecta.

Tennessee Senate
Party	Leader	Before	After	Change
Republican	Randy McNally	28	27	▼1
Democratic	Jeff Yarbro	5	6	▲1
Total		33	33	

Tennessee House of Representatives
Party	Leader	Before	After	Change
Republican	Cameron Sexton	73	73	Steady
Democratic	Karen Camper	25	26	▲1
Independent	John DeBerry	1	0	Steady
Total		99	99	

=== Texas ===
Senate results

House of Representatives results

Half of the seats of the Texas Senate and all of the seats of the Texas House of Representatives were up for election in 2020. Republicans retained control of both chambers, maintaining a government trifecta.

Texas Senate
Party	Leader	Before	After	Change
Republican	Brian Birdwell	19	18	▼1
Democratic	John Whitmire	12	13	▲1
Total		31	31	

Texas House of Representatives
Party	Leader	Before	After	Change
Republican	Dennis Bonnen	83	83	Steady
Democratic	Chris Turner	67	67	Steady
Total		150	150	

=== Utah ===
Half of the seats of the Utah State Senate and all of the seats of the Utah House of Representatives were up for election in 2020. Republicans retained control of both chambers, maintaining a government trifecta.

Utah State Senate
Party	Leader	Before	After	Change
Republican	J. Stuart Adams	23	23	Steady
Democratic	Karen Mayne	6	6	Steady
Total		29	29	

Utah House of Representatives
Party	Leader	Before	After	Change
Republican	Brad Wilson	59	58	▼1
Democratic	Brian King	16	17	▲1
Total		75	75	

=== Vermont ===
All of the seats of the Vermont Senate and the Vermont House of Representatives were up for election in 2020. Democrats retained control of both chambers.

Vermont Senate
Party	Leader	Before	After	Change
Democratic	Becca Balint	22	21	▼1
Republican	Joe Benning	6	7	▲1
Progressive	Anthony Pollina	2	2	Steady
Total		30	30	

Vermont House of Representatives
Party	Leader	Before	After	Change
Democratic	Mitzi Johnson	95	92	▼3
Republican	Patricia McCoy	43	46	▲3
Progressive	Robin Chesnut-Tangerman	7	7	Steady
Independent		5	5	Steady
Total		150	150	

=== Washington ===
Half of the seats of the Washington State Senate and all of the seats of the Washington House of Representatives were up for election in 2020. Democrats retained control of both chambers, maintaining a government trifecta.

Washington State Senate
Party	Leader	Before	After	Change
Democratic	Karen Keiser	28	28	Steady
Democratic	John Braun	1 (Note: One Democrat caucused with the Republicans)	1	Steady
Republican	John Braun	20	20	Steady
Total		49	49	

Washington House of Representatives
Party	Leader	Before	After	Change
Democratic	Laurie Jinkins	57	57	Steady
Republican	J. T. Wilcox	41	41	Steady
Total		98	98	

=== West Virginia ===
Senate results

House of Delegates results

Half of the seats of the West Virginia Senate and all of the seats of the West Virginia House of Delegates were up for election in 2020. Republicans retained control of both chambers, maintaining a government trifecta.

West Virginia Senate
Party	Leader	Before	After	Change
Republican	Mitch Carmichael	20	23	▲3
Democratic	Roman Prezioso	14	11	▼3
Total		34	34	

West Virginia House of Delegates
Party	Leader	Before	After	Change
Republican	Roger Hanshaw	58	76	▲18
Democratic	Tim Miley	41	24	▼17
Independent		1	0	▼1
Total		100	100	

=== Wisconsin ===
Senate results

State Assembly results

Half of the seats of the Wisconsin Senate and all of the seats of the Wisconsin State Assembly were up for election in 2020. Republicans retained control of both chambers.

Wisconsin Senate
Party	Leader	Before	After	Change
Republican	Scott Fitzgerald (retired)	19	21	▲2
Democratic	Janet Bewley	14	12	▼2
Total		33	33	

Wisconsin State Assembly
Party	Leader	Before	After	Change
Republican	Robin Vos	63	61	▼2
Democratic	Gordon Hintz	36	38	▲2
Total		99	99	

=== Wyoming ===
Senate results

House of Representatives results

Half of the seats of the Wyoming Senate and all of the seats of the Wyoming House of Representatives were up for election in 2020. Republicans retained control of both chambers, maintaining a government trifecta.

Wyoming Senate
Party	Leader	Before	After	Change
Republican	Drew Perkins	27	28	▲1
Democratic	Chris Rothfuss	3	2	▼1
Total		30	30	

Wyoming House of Representatives
Party	Leader	Before	After	Change
Republican	Steve Harshman	50	51	▲1
Democratic	Cathy Connolly	9	7	▼2
Libertarian	—N/a	0	1	▲1
Independent	—N/a	1	1	Steady
Total		60	60	

== Territorial and federal district summaries ==
=== American Samoa ===
All of the seats of the American Samoa Senate and the American Samoa House of Representatives were up for election. Members of the senate serve four-year terms, while members of the house of representative serve two-year terms. Gubernatorial and legislative elections are conducted on a nonpartisan basis in American Samoa.

=== Guam ===
All of the seats of the unicameral Legislature of Guam were up for election. All members of the legislature serve a two-year term. Democrats retained control of the legislature.

Guam Legislature
Party	Leader	Before	After	Change
Democratic	Tina Rose Muña Barnes	10	8	▼2
Republican	Telo T. Taitague	5	7	▲2
Total		15	15	

=== Northern Mariana Islands ===
A portion of the seats of the Northern Mariana Islands Senate, and all of the seats of the Northern Mariana Islands House of Representatives, were up for election. Members of the senate serve either four-year terms, while members of the house serve two-year terms. Republicans maintained control of the upper house, but the House was evenly split with one independent caucusing with the nine Republicans and two independents caucusing with the eight Democrats. Control of the chamber was secured for the Democratic-led caucus when one Republican crossed party lines to elect Democrat-aligned Independent Edmund Villagomez as Speaker of the House.

Northern Mariana Islands Senate
Party	Leader	Before	After	Change
Republican	Victor Hocog	6	5	▼1
Independent	Paul Manglona	3	3	Steady
Democratic	Edith Guerrero	0	1	▲1
Total		9	9	

Northern Mariana Islands House of Representatives
Party	Leader	Before	After	Change
Republican	Blas Jonathan T. Attao	13	9	▼4
Democratic	Edmund Villagomez	3	8	▲5
Independent		3	3	Steady
Total		20	20	

=== Puerto Rico ===
Senate results

House of Representatives results

All of the seats of the Senate of Puerto Rico and the House of Representatives of Puerto Rico are up for election in 2020. Members of the Senate and the House of Representatives both serve four-year terms. The New Progressive Party lost control of both chambers, although the Popular Democratic Party only managed to gain majority control in the House due to the number of third-party candidates elected.

Puerto Rico Senate
Party	Leader	Before	After	Change
Popular Democratic	José Luis Dalmau	4	13	▲9
New Progressive	Thomas Rivera Schatz	21	9	▼12
Citizen's Victory Movement	Ana Irma Rivera Lassén	0	2	▲2
Puerto Rican Independence	María de Lourdes Santiago	1	1	Steady
Project Dignity	Joanne Rodríguez Veve	0	1	▲1
Independent		1	1	Steady
Total		27	27	

Puerto Rico House of Representatives
Party	Leader	Before	After	Change
Popular Democratic	Tatito Hernández	16	26	▲10
New Progressive	Carlos Johnny Méndez	34	21	▼13
Citizen's Victory Movement	Mariana Nogales Molinelli	0	2	▲2
Puerto Rican Independence	Denis Márquez Lebrón	1	1	Steady
Project Dignity	Lisie Burgos Muñiz	0	1	▲1
Total		51	51	

=== U.S. Virgin Islands ===
All of the seats of the unicameral Legislature of the Virgin Islands were up for election in 2020. All members of the legislature serve a two-year term. Democrats retained control of the legislature.

Virgin Islands Legislature
Party	Leader	Before	After	Change
Democratic	Novelle Francis	13	10	▼3
Independent		2	5	▲3
Total		15	15	

=== Washington, D.C. ===
Council results

The Council of the District of Columbia serves as the legislative branch of the federal district of Washington, D.C. Half of the council seats are up for election in 2020. Council members serve four-year terms. Democrats retained supermajority control of the council.

District of Columbia Council
Party	Leader	Before	After	Change
Democratic	Phil Mendelson	11	11	Steady
Independent		2	2	Steady
Total	13	13		

== Special elections ==
Various states held special elections for legislative districts throughout the year. Overall, Democrats flipped a total of seven seats, including 3 in Massachusetts, and one each in New Hampshire, Oregon, Kentucky, and South Carolina, while Republicans flipped one seat in Kentucky.

=== Alabama ===
District		Incumbent			This race	
Chamber	No.	Representative	Party	First elected	Results	Candidates
House	49	April Weaver	Republican	2010	Incumbent resigned May 12, 2020, to become a regional director for the U.S. Department of Health and Human Services. New member elected November 17, 2020. Republican hold.	▌ ✓ Russell Bedsole (Republican) 63.2%; ▌ Cheryl Patton (Democratic) 36.7%

=== Alaska ===
District		Incumbent			This race	
Chamber	No.	Representative	Party	First elected	Results	Candidates
Senate	M	Chris Birch	Republican	2018	Incumbent died August 7, 2019, of aortic dissection. New member elected November 3, 2020. Republican hold.	▌ ✓ Josh Revak (Republican) 57.6%; ▌ Andy Hollerman (Independent) 42.1%

=== Arkansas ===
District		Incumbent			This race	
Chamber	No.	Representative	Party	First elected	Results	Candidates
House	22	Mickey Gates	Republican	2014	Incumbent was removed from office October 11, 2019, after being charged with tax evasion. New member elected March 3, 2020. Republican hold.	▌ ✓ Richard McGrew (Republican) 68.3%; ▌ Judy Bowers (Libertarian) 31.7%
House	34	John Walker	Democratic	2010	Incumbent died October 28, 2019. New member elected March 3, 2020. Democratic hold.	▌ ✓ Joy Springer (Democratic) 77.9%; ▌ Roderick Talley (Independent) 22.1%
House	96	Grant Hodges	Republican	2014	Incumbent resigned July 10, 2020, to take a job with Northwest Arkansas Community College. New member elected November 3, 2020. Republican hold.	▌ ✓ Jill Bryant (Republican) 100.0%

=== California ===
District		Incumbent			This race	
Chamber	No.	Representative	Party	First elected	Results	Candidates
Senate	28	Jeff Stone	Republican	2014	Incumbent resigned November 1, 2019, after being appointed Western Regional Director of the U.S. Department of Labor. New member elected November 3, 2020. Republican hold.	▌ ✓ Melissa Melendez (Republican) 55.4%; ▌ Elizabeth Romero (Democratic) 44.6%

=== Connecticut ===
District		Incumbent			This race	
Chamber	No.	Representative	Party	First elected	Results	Candidates
House	48	Linda Orange	Democratic	1996	Incumbent died November 20, 2019, of pancreatic cancer. New member elected January 14, 2020. Democratic hold.	▌▌ ✓ Brian Smith (Democratic) 52.3%; ▌▌ Mark DeCaprio 47.7%
House	132	Brenda Kupchick	Republican	2010	Incumbent resigned November 22, 2019, after being elected First Selectwoman of Fairfield. New member elected January 14, 2020. Republican hold.	▌▌ ✓ Brian Farnen (Republican) 50.8%; ▌ Jennifer Leeper (Democratic) 49.2%
House	151	Fred Camillo	Republican	2008	Incumbent resigned December 2, 2019, after being elected First Selectman of Greenwich. New member elected January 21, 2020. Republican hold.	▌ ✓ Harry Arora (Republican) 54.4%; ▌ Cheryl Moss (Democratic) 45.6%

=== Florida ===
District		Incumbent			This race	
Chamber	No.	Representative	Party	First elected	Results	Candidates
Senate	20	Tom Lee	Republican	2012	Incumbent resigned November 3, 2020, to consider a run for Hillsborough County Clerk of Court. New member elected November 3, 2020. Republican hold.	▌ ✓ Danny Burgess (Republican) 54.8%; ▌ Kathy Lewis (Democratic) 45.2%

=== Georgia ===
District		Incumbent			This race	
Chamber	No.	Representative	Party	First elected	Results	Candidates
House	171	Jay Powell	Republican	2008	Incumbent died November 25, 2019. New member elected January 28, 2020. Republican hold.	▌ ✓ Joe Campbell (Republican) 58.2%; ▌ Jewell Howard 33.4% (Democratic); ▌ Tommy Akridge 8.4% (Republican)
Senate	13	Greg Kirk	Republican	2014	Incumbent died December 22, 2019, of bile duct cancer. New member elected March 3, 2020, after no one received over 50% of the vote on February 4, 2020. Republican hold.	▌ ✓ Carden Summers (Republican) 52.0%; ▌ Jim Quinn (Republican) 48.0%
Senate	4	Jack Hill	Republican	2008	Incumbent died April 6, 2020. New member elected August 11, 2020 after no one received over 50% of the vote on June 9, 2020. Republican hold.	▌ ✓ Billy Hickman (Republican) 56.3%; ▌ Scott Bohlke (Republican) 43.7%
Senate	39	Nikema Williams	Democratic	2017 (special)	Incumbent resigned January 3, 2021, to become a U.S. representative. New member elected December 1, 2020 after no one received over 50% of the vote on November 3, 2020. Democratic hold. (Note: Since Williams had already been made the party's nominee at the June 9, 2020 primary, this election was held as a Democratic Primary.)	▌ ✓ Sonya Halpern (Democratic) 80.8%; ▌ Linda Pritchett (Democratic) 19.2%

=== Hawaii ===
District		Incumbent			This race	
Chamber	No.	Representative	Party	First elected	Results	Candidates
Senate	16	Breene Harimoto	Democratic	2014	Incumbent died June 18, 2020, of pancreatic cancer. New member elected November 3, 2020. Democratic hold.	▌ ✓ Bennette Misalucha (Democratic) 52.7%; ▌ Kelly Puamailani Kitashima (Republican) 47.3%

=== Illinois ===
District		Incumbent			This race	
Chamber	No.	Representative	Party	First elected	Results	Candidates
Senate	6	John Cullerton	Democratic	1990	Incumbent resigned January 20, 2020 for personal reasons. New member elected November 3, 2020. Democratic hold.	▌ ✓ Sara Feigenholtz (Democratic)
Senate	11	Martin Sandoval	Democratic	2002	Incumbent resigned January 1, 2020 amid a corruption scandal. New member elected November 3, 2020. Democratic hold.	▌ ✓ Celina Villanueva (Democratic) 79.7%; ▌ Mary Ellen Brown (Democracy in America) 20.3%

=== Kentucky ===
District		Incumbent			This race	
Chamber	No.	Representative	Party	First elected	Results	Candidates
Senate	171	Dan Seum	Republican	1994	Incumbent resigned November 16, 2019, for personal reasons. New member elected January 14, 2020. Republican hold.	▌ ✓ Michael J. Nemes (Republican) 63.6%; ▌ Andrew Bailey (Democratic) 36.4%
House	67	Dennis Keene	Democratic	2004	Incumbent resigned December 16, 2019, to become the Kentucky Commissioner of Local Government. New member elected February 25, 2020. Democratic hold.	▌ ✓ Rachel Roberts (Democratic) 64.2%; ▌ Mary Jo Wedding (Republican) 35.8%
House	99	Rocky Adkins	Democratic	1986	Incumbent resigned December 10, 2019, to become senior advisor to Governor Andy Beshear. New member elected February 25, 2020. Republican gain.	▌ ✓ Richard White (Republican) 56.0%; ▌ Bill Redwine (Democratic) 44.0%
Senate	26	Ernie Harris	Republican	1994	Incumbent resigned on April 15, 2020 for personal reasons. New member elected December 1, 2020. Democratic gain.	▌ ✓ Karen Berg (Democratic) 57.0%; ▌ Bill Ferko (Republican) 43.0%

=== Louisiana ===
District		Incumbent			This race	
Chamber	No.	Representative	Party	First elected	Results	Candidates
House	54	Reggie Bagala	Republican	2019	Incumbent died April 9, 2020, of COVID-19. New member elected July 11, 2020. Republican hold.	▌ ✓ Joseph Orgeron (Republican) 54.6%; ▌ James Cantrelle (Republican) 19.6%; ▌ Donny Lerille (Republican) 10.9%; ▌ Kevin Duet (Republican) 9.3%; ▌ Phil Gilligan (Republican) 3.3%; ▌ Dave Carskadon (Republican) 2.4%

=== Maine ===
District		Incumbent			This race	
Chamber	No.	Representative	Party	First elected	Results	Candidates
House	128	Arthur Verow	Democratic	2018	Incumbent died December 19, 2019, of a heart attack. New member elected March 3, 2020. Democratic hold.	▌ ✓ Kevin O'Connell (Democratic) 58.0%; ▌ Garrel Craig (Republican) 42.0%

=== Massachusetts ===
District		Incumbent			This race	
Chamber	No.	Representative	Party	First elected	Results	Candidates
House	Middlesex 32	Paul A. Brodeur	Democratic	2010	Incumbent resigned November 15, 2019, to become Mayor of Melrose. New member elected March 3, 2020. Democratic hold.	▌ ✓ Kate Lipper-Garabedian (Democratic) 81.2%; ▌ Brandon Reid (Republican) 18.5%
Senate	Plymouth and Barnstable	Vinny deMacedo	Republican	2014	Incumbent resigned November 29, 2019, to take a job in higher education. New member elected May 11, 2020. Democratic gain.	▌ ✓ Susan Moran (Democratic) 56.2%; ▌ James McMahon (Republican) 43.7%
Senate	Hampden and Hampshire 2	Donald Humason Jr.	Republican	2012	Incumbent resigned January 5, 2020, to become Mayor of Westfield. New member elected May 11, 2020. Democratic gain.	▌ ✓ John Velis (Democratic) 64.2%; ▌ John Cain (Republican) 35.8%
House	Bristol 3	Shaunna O'Connell	Republican	2010	Incumbent resigned January 6, 2020, to become Mayor of Taunton. New member elected June 2, 2020. Democratic gain.	▌ ✓ Carol Doherty (Democratic) 57.0%; ▌ Bill Ferko (Republican) 42.8%
House	Middlesex 37	Jennifer Benson	Democratic	2008	Incumbent resigned January 8, 2020 to become President of Alliance for Business Leadership. New member elected June 2, 2020. Democratic hold.	▌ ✓ Danillo Sena (Democratic) 73.9%; ▌ Catherine Clark (Republican) 25.6%

=== Michigan ===
District		Incumbent			This race	
Chamber	No.	Representative	Party	First elected	Results	Candidates
House	34	Sheldon Neeley	Democratic	2014	Incumbent resigned November 11, 2019, to become Mayor of Flint. New member elected March 10, 2020. Democratic hold.	▌ ✓ Cynthia Neeley (Democratic) 91.8%; ▌ Adam Ford (Republican) 8.2%
House	4	Isaac Robinson	Democratic	2018	Incumbent died March 29, 2020, from breathing problems. New member elected November 3, 2020. Democratic hold.	▌ ✓ Abraham Aiyash (Democratic)

=== Minnesota ===
District		Incumbent			This race	
Chamber	No.	Representative	Party	First elected	Results	Candidates
House	30A	Nick Zerwas	Republican	2012	Incumbent resigned December 6, 2019, citing medical reasons. New member elected February 4, 2020. Republican hold.	▌ ✓ Paul Novotny (Republican) 63.4%; ▌ Chad Hobot (Democratic) 36.5%
House	60A	Diane Loeffler	Democratic	2004	Incumbent died November 16, 2019, of cancer. New member elected February 4, 2020. Democratic hold.	▌ ✓ Sydney Jordan (Democratic) 87.4%; ▌ Martin Super (Legal Marijuana Now) 11.5%; ▌ Write-in 1.1%

=== Mississippi ===
District		Incumbent			This race	
Chamber	No.	Representative	Party	First elected	Results	Candidates
House	88	Ramona Blackledge	Republican	2019	Incumbent resigned January 31, 2020 for personal reasons. New member elected June 23, 2020. Republican hold.	▌ ✓ Robin Robinson (Nonpartisan) 65.1%; ▌ Michael Walker (Nonpartisan) 33.0%; ▌ Jason Dykes (Nonpartisan) 1.9%
House	37	Gary Chism	Republican	1999	Incumbent resigned June 30, 2020, for personal reasons. New member elected October 13, 2020, after no one received over 50% of the vote on September 22, 2020. Republican hold.	▌ ✓ Lynn Wright (Nonpartisan) 63.4%; ▌ David Chism (Nonpartisan) 36.6%
House	66	Jarvis Dortch	Democratic	2015	Incumbent resigned July 2, 2020, to become executive director of the Mississippi American Civil Liberties Union. New member elected October 13, 2020, after no one received over 50% of the vote on September 22, 2020. Democratic hold.	▌ ✓ De'Keither Stamps (Nonpartisan) 61.5%; ▌ Bob Lee Jr. (Nonpartisan) 38.5%
Senate	15	Gary Jackson	Republican	2003	Incumbent resigned June 30, 2020, for health reasons. New member elected October 13, 2020, after no one received over 50% of the vote on September 22, 2020. Republican hold.	▌ ✓ Bart Williams (Nonpartisan) 53.5%; ▌ Joyce Meek Yates (Nonpartisan) 46.5%
Senate	39	Sally Doty	Republican	2011	Incumbent resigned July 16, 2020, after she was appointed executive director of the Mississippi Public Utilities Staff by Governor Tate Reeves. New member elected October 13, 2020, after no one received over 50% of the vote on September 22, 2020. Republican hold.	▌ ✓ Jason Barrett (Nonpartisan) 56.9%; ▌ Bob Lee Jr. (Nonpartisan) 43.1%
House	87	William Andrews III	Republican	2019	Incumbent resigned March 31, 2020. New member elected November 24, 2020, after no one received over 50% of the vote on November 3, 2020. Republican hold.	▌ ✓ Joseph Tubb (Nonpartisan) 58.3%; ▌ Bob Lee Jr. (Nonpartisan) 41.7%

=== New Hampshire ===
District		Incumbent			This race	
Chamber	No.	Representative	Party	First elected	Results	Candidates
House	Merrimack 24	Richard Marple	Republican	2018	Incumbent died December 13, 2019. New member elected March 10, 2020. Democratic gain.	▌ ✓ Kathleen Martins (Democratic) 51.0%; ▌ Elliot Axelman (Republican) 49.0%

=== New Jersey ===
District		Incumbent			This race	
Chamber	No.	Representative	Party	First elected	Results	Candidates
Senate	25	Anthony R. Bucco	Republican	1997	Incumbent died September 16, 2019, of a heart attack. New member elected November 3, 2020. Republican hold.	▌ ✓ Anthony M. Bucco (Republican) 54.0%; ▌ Rupande Mehta (Democratic) 46.0%
Assembly	25	Anthony M. Bucco	Republican	2009	Incumbent resigned October 24, 2019, after being appointed to the New Jersey Senate. New member elected November 3, 2020. Republican hold.	▌ ✓ Aura K. Dunn (Republican) 52.5%; ▌ Darcy Draeger (Democratic) 47.5%

=== Oklahoma ===
District		Incumbent			This race	
Chamber	No.	Representative	Party	First elected	Results	Candidates
Senate	28	Jason Smalley	Republican	2014	Incumbent resigned January 31, 2020, to take a private sector job with Motorola Solutions. New member elected outright after the November 3, 2020, general election was cancelled. Republican hold.	▌ ✓ Zack Taylor (Republican)

=== Oregon ===
District		Incumbent			This race	
Chamber	No.	Representative	Party	First elected	Results	Candidates
Senate	10	Jackie Winters	Republican	2002	Incumbent died May 29, 2019, of lung cancer. New member elected November 3, 2020. Democratic gain.	▌▌ ✓ Deb Patterson (Democratic) 48.5%; ▌ Denyc Boles (Republican) 47.8%; ▌ Taylor Rickey (Libertarian) 3.6%

=== Pennsylvania ===
District		Incumbent			This race	
Chamber	No.	Representative	Party	First elected	Results	Candidates
Senate	48	Mike Folmer	Republican	2006	Incumbent resigned September 18, 2019, after being charged with possession of child pornography. New member elected January 14, 2020. Republican hold.	▌ ✓ Dave Arnold (Republican) 64.7%; ▌ Michael Schroeder (Democratic) 35.3%
House	190	Movita Johnson-Harrell	Democratic	2019 (special)	Incumbent resigned December 13, 2019, after being charged with theft, perjury, and tampering with public records. New member elected February 25, 2020. Democratic hold.	▌ ✓ G. Roni Green (Democratic) 85.6%; ▌ Wanda Logan (Republican) 13.6%
House	8	Tedd Nesbit	Republican	2014	Incumbent resigned January 2, 2020, to join the Pennsylvania courts of common pleas from Mercer County. New member elected March 17, 2020. Republican hold.	▌ ✓ Timothy R. Bonner (Republican) 75.1%; ▌ Phil Heasley (Democratic) 24.9%
House	18	Gene DiGirolamo	Republican	1994	Incumbent resigned January 6, 2020, after being elected to the Bucks County Board of Commissioners. New member elected March 17, 2020. Republican hold.	▌ ✓ K.C. Tomlinson (Republican) 55.2%; ▌ Harold Hayes (Democratic) 44.8%
House	58	Justin Walsh	Republican	2016	Incumbent resigned December 26, 2019, to join the Pennsylvania courts of common pleas from Westmoreland County. New member elected March 17, 2020. Republican hold.	▌ ✓ Eric Davanzo (Republican) 52.6%; ▌ Robert Prah Jr. (Democratic) 40.6%; ▌ Ken Bach (Libertarian) 6.8%

=== Rhode Island ===
District		Incumbent			This race	
Chamber	No.	Representative	Party	First elected	Results	Candidates
House	56	Shelby Maldonado	Democratic	2014	Incumbent resigned December 16, 2019, to become the Hispanic Outreach Director for AIPAC. New member elected March 3, 2020. Democratic hold.	▌ ✓ Joshua Giraldo (Democratic) 99.6%

=== South Carolina ===
District		Incumbent			This race	
Chamber	No.	Representative	Party	First elected	Results	Candidates
House	115	Peter M. McCoy Jr.	Republican	2010	Incumbent resigned March 30, 2020, to become interim U.S. Attorney for the District of South Carolina. New member elected August 11, 2020. Democratic gain.	▌ ✓ Spencer Wetmore (Democratic) 59.5%; ▌ Josh Stokes (Republican) 39.3%; ▌ Eugene Platt (Green) 1.1%
House	107	Alan D. Clemmons	Republican	2002	Incumbent resigned July 17, 2020, to practice law. New member elected November 3, 2020. Republican hold.	▌ ✓ Case Brittain (Republican) 65.5%; ▌ Tony Cahill (Democratic) 32.7%; ▌ Wm Dettmering III (Libertarian) 1.8%

=== Texas ===
District		Incumbent			This race	
Chamber	No.	Representative	Party	First elected	Results	Candidates
House	28	John Zerwas	Republican	2006	Incumbent resigned September 30, 2019, to join the University of Texas System. New member elected January 28, 2020 after no one received over 50% of the vote on November 5, 2019. Republican hold.	▌ ✓ Gary Gates (Republican) 58.1%; ▌ Elizabeth Markowitz (Democratic) 41.9%
House	100	Eric Johnson	Democratic	2010 (special)	Incumbent resigned June 17, 2019, after being elected Mayor of Dallas. New member elected January 28, 2020 after no one received over 50% of the vote on November 5, 2019. Democratic hold.	▌ ✓ Lorraine Birabil (Democratic) 66.2%; ▌ James Armstrong III (Democratic) 33.8%
House	148	Jessica Farrar	Democratic	1994	Incumbent resigned September 30, 2019. New member elected January 28, 2020 after no one received over 50% of the vote on November 5, 2019. Democratic hold.	▌ ✓ Anna Eastman (Democratic) 65.4%; ▌ Luis LaRotta (Republican) 34.6%
Senate	14	Kirk Watson	Democratic	2006	Incumbent resigned April 30, 2020, to become the dean of the University of Houston's Hobby School of Public Affairs. New member elected July 14, 2020 after Rodriguez withdrew from the runoff. Democratic hold.	▌ ✓ Sarah Eckhardt (Democratic) 49.7%; ▌ Eddie Rodriguez (Democratic) 33.8%; ▌ Donald Zimmerman (Republican) 13.0%; ▌ Waller Thomas Burns II (Republican) 1.2%; ▌ Jeff Ridgeway (Independent) 1.2%; ▌ Pat Dixon (Libertarian) 1.1%
Senate	30	Pat Fallon	Republican	2018	Incumbent resigned January 3, 2021 to become a U.S. representative. New member elected December 19, 2020 after no one received over 50% of the vote on September 29, 2020. Republican hold.	▌ ✓ Drew Springer (Republican) 56.5%; ▌ James Armstrong III (Republican) 43.5%

=== Virginia ===
District		Incumbent			This race	
Chamber	No.	Representative	Party	First elected	Results	Candidates
House	29	Chris Collins	Republican	2015	Incumbent resigned June 28, 2020, after he was appointed to the Virginia General District Court. New member elected November 3, 2020. Republican hold.	▌ ✓ Bill Wiley (Republican) 63.7%; ▌ Irina Khanin (Democratic) 36.2%

=== Washington ===
District		Incumbent			This race	
Chamber	No.	Representative	Party	First elected	Results	Candidates
Senate	38	John McCoy	Democratic	2014 (Note: McCoy was appointed to the seat in 2013, but was later elected to a full term in 2014.)	Incumbent resigned April 17, 2020, citing health reasons. New member elected November 3, 2020. Democratic hold.	▌ ✓ June Robinson (Democratic) 58.8%; ▌ Bernard Moody (Republican) 41.1%

== See also ==
- 2020 United States presidential election
- 2020 United States Senate elections
- 2020 United States House of Representatives elections
- 2020 United States gubernatorial elections
