= Connecticut's 132nd House of Representatives district =

American legislative district

Connecticut's 132nd State House of Representatives district
Representative
Jennifer Leeper; D

Connecticut's 132nd House of Representatives district elects one member of the Connecticut House of Representatives. It encompasses parts of Fairfield and has been represented by Democrat Jennifer Leeper since 2021.

== List of representatives ==
List of representatives from Connecticut's 132nd State House district
Representative	Party	Years	District home	Note
James P. McLoughlin	Democratic	1967–1971	Bridgeport	Seat created
Robert G. Bruno	Republican	1971–1973	Bridgeport	
Joseph R. Fuse Jr.	Republican	1973–1975	Fairfield	
John R. Quinn	Democratic	1975–1983	Fairfield	
Susan Barrett	Democratic	1983–1985	Fairfield	
John G. Metsopoulos	Republican	1985–1995	Fairfield	
Carl Dickman	Republican	1995–2005	Fairfield	
Thomas J. Drew	Democratic	2005–2011	Fairfield	
Brenda Kupchick	Republican	2011–2019	Fairfield	Resigned to serve as first selectman of Fairfield
Brian Farnen	Republican	2020–2021	Fairfield	Elected in special election
Jennifer Leeper	Democratic	2021–	Fairfield	

== Recent elections ==
=== 2020 ===
2020 Connecticut State House of Representatives election, District 132
Party	Candidate	Votes	%
Democratic	Jennifer Leeper	7,388	49.32
Republican	Brian Farnen (incumbent)	6,885	45.96
Independent Party	Brian Farnen (incumbent)	459	3.06
Working Families	Jennifer Leeper	249	1.66
Total votes		14,981	100.00
Democratic gain from Republican			

=== 2018 ===
2018 Connecticut House of Representatives election, District 132
Party	Candidate	Votes	%
Republican	Brenda Kupchick (Incumbent)	6,533	54.6
Democratic	Caitlin Clarkson-Pereira	5,432	45.4
Total votes		11,965	100.00
Republican hold			

=== 2016 ===
2016 Connecticut House of Representatives election, District 132
Party	Candidate	Votes	%
Republican	Brenda Kupchick (Incumbent)	7,984	59.97
Democratic	Dru Georgiadis	5,330	40.03
Total votes		13,314	100.00
Republican hold			

=== 2014 ===
2014 Connecticut House of Representatives election, District 132
Party	Candidate	Votes	%
Republican	Brenda Kupchick (Incumbent)	5,233	58.2
Democratic	Kevin Coyner	3,233	36.0
Independent Party	Brenda Kupchick (Incumbent)	349	3.9
Working Families	Kevin Coyner	169	1.9
Total votes		8,984	100.00
Republican hold			

=== 2012 ===
2012 Connecticut House of Representatives election, District 132
Party	Candidate	Votes	%
Republican	Brenda Kupchick (Incumbent)	6,708	54.5
Democratic	Sue Brand	5,593	45.5
Total votes		12,301	100.00
Republican hold			
