= Penny Morales Shaw =

American attorney and politician (born 1966)

Member of the Texas House of Representatives from the 148th district
- Incumbent
- Assumed office January 12, 2021
- Preceded by: Anna Eastman

Personal details
- Born: Penelope Morales Shaw; March 17, 1966 (age 60) Houston, Texas, U.S.
- Party: Democratic
- Children: 4
- Education: Nova Southeastern University (JD)
- Occupation: Attorney
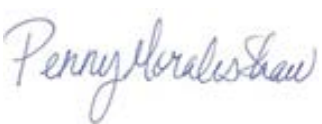
- Signature
- Website: Campaign website

Penny Morales Shaw (born March 17, 1966) is an American attorney and politician. She was elected to the Texas House of Representatives in 2020 to represent the 148th District, which includes parts of Spring Branch, Garden Oaks/Oak Forest, Carverdale, and Cypress-Fairbanks. She is a member of the Democratic Party.

== Early life and education ==
Morales Shaw is one of seven children, raised primarily in Houston, Texas while attending public schools. Her father was in the Air Force and her mother was a pharmacist technician. She cites her father's service for her advocacy for veterans affairs issues.

She obtained her Juris Doctor from the Shepard Broad College of Law at Nova Southeastern University in June 2000. Morales Shaw was widowed shortly after graduating from law school, raising four children while maintaining her law practice.

== Career ==
Morales Shaw practiced law and spent several years in Washington, D.C. as congressional advocate for passing laws, including International Violence Against Women Act. She also worked for the NAACP.

She is a local business owner and held a multi-state law practice.

== Elections ==
Morales Shaw ran for Harris County Commissioner Court in 2018, but lost with 48% of the vote in a close race.

Morales Shaw served as the Deputy Chief for Harris County Commissioner, Precinct 2 before running for public office.

She also ran for the Texas House of Representatives District 148th seat in a special election in November 2019, but only came out to 8% of the vote. Anna Eastman won the special election in January 2020.

In the primaries, none of the five democratic candidates received the threshold to move on for the November 2020 election. Morales Shaw and Eastman were the top two candidates and advance to a runoff election in July. In the democratic primary runoff, Shaw defeated Eastman in a close race only by less than 3 points (or 200 votes). Morales Shaw ran defeated Republican Luis LaRotta in the general election with 63% of the vote.

Following redistricting, Morales Shaw ran unopposed in the Democratic primary and defeated Republican Kay Smith with 55.5% of the vote in the November 2022 election. She is faced Smith again in the November 2024 election and won re-election with 54.9% of the vote.

In the November 2026 election, Morales Shaw won re-election against Republican nominee Amanda LaBrie.

== Texas House of Representatives ==
Morales Shaw took office on January 12, 2021. She was one of the Texas House Democratic members who walked out on the July legislative session, travelling to Washington, D.C. to advocate for federal voting rights legislation in response to state legislation following the 2020 election.

During the 87th Legislative Session, she was appointed to serve on the House Environmental Regulation Committee and the House Urban Affairs Committee. During the 88th Legislative Session, she served on the Defense & Veterans' Affairs, Environmental Regulation, and Local & Consent Calendars committees.

She is a member of the House Innovation & Technology Caucus, House LGBTQ Caucus, Legislative Study Group, Mexican-American Legislative Caucus (MALC), Texas Legislative Ports Caucus, Texas Women’s Health Caucus, and the House Caucus on Climate, Environment, and the Energy Industry.

Texas House of Representatives
Preceded by Anna Eastman	Member of the Texas House of Representatives from the 148th district 2021–present	Incumbent
