= Georgia's 171st House of Representatives district =

State district in Georgia, USA

Georgia's 171st State House of Representatives district
Representative
Joe Campbell; R–Camilla
- Demographics: 53.2% White; 39.1% Black; 5.8% Hispanic; 0.6% Asian
- Population: 53,068

District 171 elects one member of the Georgia House of Representatives. It contains the entirety of Decatur County and Mitchell County, as well as parts of Grady County.

== Members ==
- Jay Powell (2009–2019)
- Joe Campbell (since 2020)
