= Susan Barrett =

American politician

Member of the Connecticut House of Representatives from the 132nd district
- In office 1983–1985
- Preceded by: John R. Quinn
- Succeeded by: John G. Metsopoulos

Personal details
- Party: Democratic

Susan P. Barrett is an American politician who served in the Connecticut House of Representatives from 1983 to 1985, representing the 132nd district, which encompasses parts of Fairfield, as a Democrat.
