= Brenda Kupchick =

American politician (born 1964)

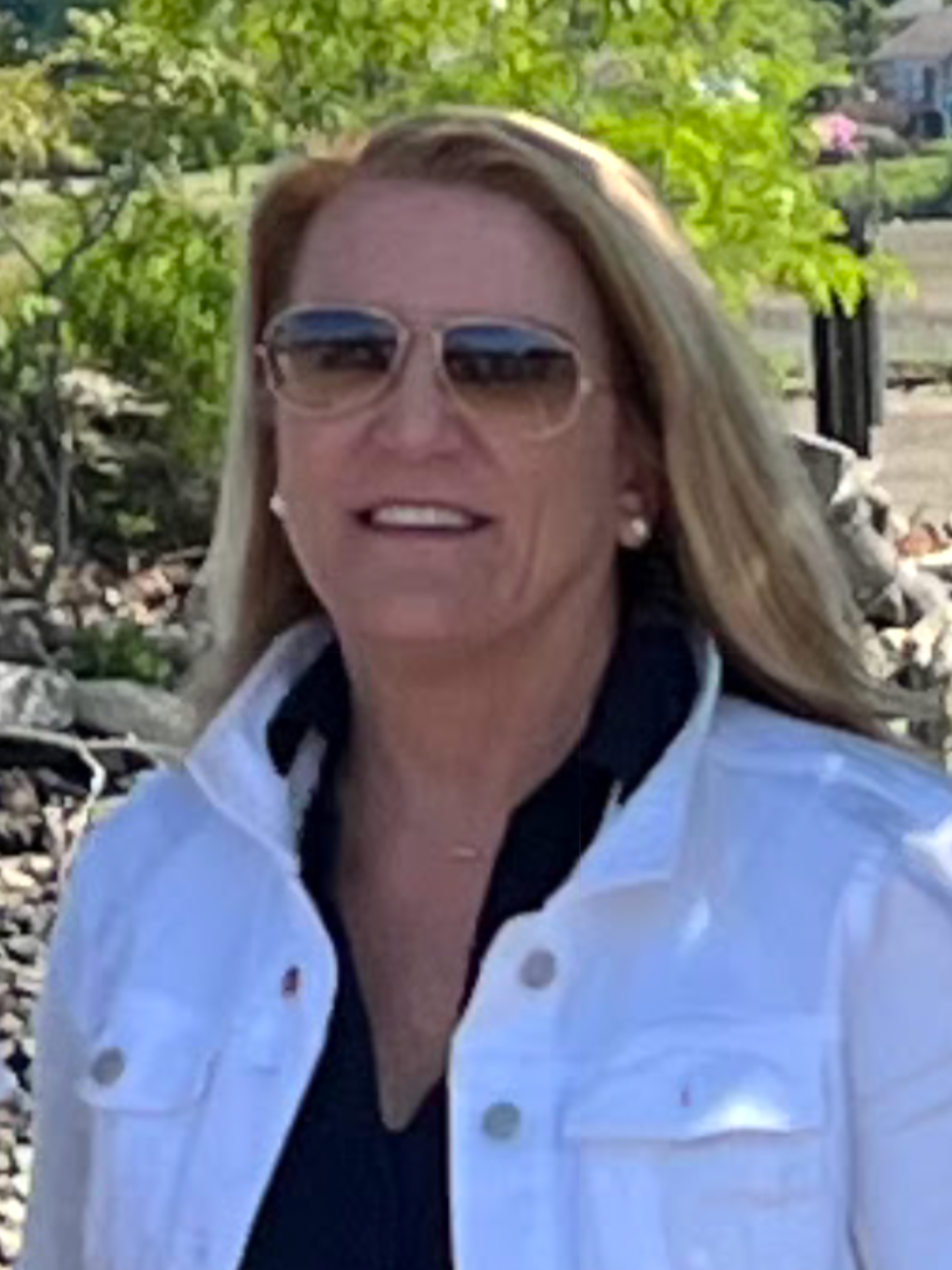
- Kupchick in 2023

First Selectman of Fairfield, Connecticut
- In office November 25, 2019 – November 27, 2023
- Preceded by: Michael Tetreau
- Succeeded by: Bill Gerber

Member of the Connecticut House of Representatives from the 132nd district
- In office January 5, 2011 – November 22, 2019
- Preceded by: Thomas J. Drew
- Succeeded by: Brian Farnen

Personal details
- Born: November 29, 1964 (age 61) Fairfield, Connecticut, U.S.
- Party: Republican

Brenda Kupchick (born November 29, 1964) is an American politician who served as the First Selectman of Fairfield, Connecticut from 2019 to 2023, and as a member of the Connecticut House of Representatives from the 132nd district from 2011 to 2019. She was Fairfield's second female First Selectman, after Jacquelyn Durrell, who served from 1983 to 1993.

== Career ==
Kupchick began her political involvement in 1999 when she was elected as a member of Fairfield's Representative town meeting. In 2002, she began working as a Constituent Services Representative for Congressman Chris Shays. In 2003, she was elected to Fairfield's Board of Education.

In 2010, Kupchick ran for State Representative in the 132nd district against incumbent Democrat Thomas Drew, who she defeated by just 21 votes. She was re-elected in 2012, 2014, 2016, and 2018.

In 2019, Kupchick ran for Fairfield First Selectman against incumbent Democrat Mike Tetreau, who was weakened by a public corruption scandal in his administration. Kupchick defeated Tetreau easily with almost 58% of the vote.

In 2023, Kupchick ran for re-election, facing Democrat Bill Gerber, who defeated her narrowly by just 36 votes.
