= Jessica Farrar =

American politician (born 1966)

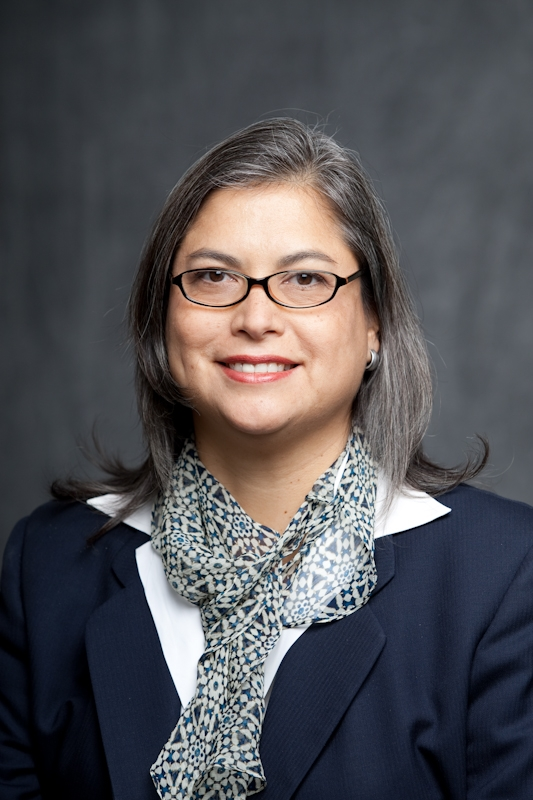

Chair of the Texas House Women's Health Caucus
- In office January 8, 2013 – January 24th, 2019
- Preceded by: Office established
- Succeeded by: Donna Howard

Member of the Texas House of Representatives from the 148th district
- In office January 10, 1995 – September 30, 2019
- Preceded by: Yolanda Navarro Flores
- Succeeded by: Anna Eastman

Personal details
- Born: November 26, 1966 (age 59) Houston, Texas, USA
- Party: Democratic
- Spouse: Marco Sanchez
- Education: University of Houston
- Profession: State Representative
- Website: www.jessicafarrar.org

Jessica Christina Farrar (born November 26, 1966) is an American politician and a former Democratic member of the Texas House of Representatives. She was first elected to the legislature in 1994 at the age of twenty-seven and was the longest serving Hispanic member of the House from Harris County, Texas. She served as the representative for House District 148. She resigned her House seat effective September 30, 2019.

Farrar served as the vice-chairman of the House Committee on Judiciary & Civil Jurisprudence and was a member on the House Committee on State Affairs. In addition, Representative Farrar served as the chairwoman of the Texas House Women's Health Caucus. During the 82nd Legislative session, she served as the head of the Texas House Democratic Caucus.

== Early life and education ==
Reared in Houston, Farrar graduated in 1984 from Lamar High School. She received a Bachelor of Architecture from the University of Houston and a Juris Doctor from the University of Texas School of Law in Austin.

== Texas House of Representatives ==
In the general election held on November 6, 2018, Farrar won her eighteenth consecutive term in the state House. With 32,147 votes (67.9 percent), she defeated the Republican candidate, Ryan Taylor McConnico (born July 15, 1989), who received 15,213 (32.1 percent).

=== Past committees ===
- 74th Legislative Session
  - Corrections
  - Criminal Jurisprudence
- 75th Legislative Session
  - Corrections
  - Criminal Jurisprudence
  - Rules & Resolutions
- 76th Legislative Session
  - Appropriations
  - Corrections
- 77th Legislative Session
  - Appropriations
  - Corrections – Vice Chair
- 78th Legislative Session
  - Corrections
  - County Affairs
- 79th Legislative Session
  - Agriculture & Livestock
  - State Affairs
- 80th Legislative Session
  - Juvenile Justice & Family Issues
  - State Affairs
- 81st Legislative Session
  - Environmental Regulation
  - Land & Resource Management – Vice Chair
- 82nd Legislative Session
  - Environmental Regulation – Vice Chair
  - Border and Intergovernmental Affairs – Member
- 83rd Legislative Session
  - House Committee on Judiciary and Civil Jurisprudence – Vice-Chair
  - House Committee on State Affairs – Member

=== Caucuses ===
- Texas Women's Health Caucus – founder and Chairwoman
- House Democratic Caucus – Member
- Texas Veterans' Caucus – Member
- Legislative Study Group – Member
- Texas Farm-to-Table Caucus – Member
- Education Caucus – Member
- Fine Arts Education Caucus – Member
- Young Texans Legislative Caucus – Member
- National Hispanic Caucus of State Legislators – Member
- Mexican American Legislative Caucus – Member

=== Notable legislation ===
Each legislative session, Farrar introduces a bill to abolish the death penalty in Texas.

In 2003, Farrar sponsored legislation that would prohibit employment discrimination based upon sexual orientation or gender identity.

In 2009, she proposed a bill that would recognize postpartum psychosis as a defense for mothers who kill their infants. Under the terms of the proposed legislation, if jurors concluded that a mother's "judgment was impaired as a result of the effects of giving birth or the effects of lactation following the birth," they would be allowed to convict her of the crime of infanticide, rather than murder. The maximum penalty for infanticide would be two years in prison. Farrar's introduction of this bill prompted liberal bioethics scholar Jacob M. Appel to call her "the bravest politician in America."

In 2011, Farrar introduced legislation that would prohibit peace officers from inquiring as to the immigration or nationality status of a witness or victim in a criminal investigation.

In March 2017, Farrar proposed a bill to fine men for masturbation and require consultations and medically-unnecessary examinations before vasectomies, colonoscopies, and the prescription of Viagra tablets. The bill is a response to what Farrar calls "the obstacles that Texas women face every day, that were placed there by legislatures making it very difficult for them to access health care." Farrar said that masturbation could be deemed "an act against an unborn child" and a "failure to preserve the sanctity of life."

=== The Killer Ds ===
In May 2003, Farrar helped to organize a group of House Democrats who left Texas for Ardmore, Oklahoma. The absence of fifty-two House Democrats prevented Republicans from obtaining a quorum and hence blocked passage of the redistricting plan during the 2003 regular session. The Killer Ds were followed by a group of eleven state senators, called the Texas Eleven, who fled the state in August 2003 for the same purposes.

== Community involvement ==
Farrar founded a non-profit mentorship and educational program for Latina college students known as Latinas on the Rise in 1998, and she serves on the board of directors. In 2001, she authored a bill to create the Greater Northside Management District, a group dedicated to promoting the economic development and quality of life for commercial property owners and to creating opportunities for new development in portions of Farrar's district. She also co-founded the Texas Women's Health Foundation in 2007, a non-partisan non-profit aimed at de-politicizing women's health issues, and she serves as an ex-officio member of its board.

Farrar also serves on the board of directors for Air Alliance Houston (formerly known as the Galveston-Houston Association for Smog Prevention), Avenue CDC, Rice Design Alliance, Women Action for New Direction Education Fund, and the National Advisory Committee of the National Latina Institute for Reproductive Health. She also serves on the Postpartum Support International's President's Advisory Council.

Texas House of Representatives
Preceded by Yolanda Navarro Flores	Texas State Representative for District 148 (Harris County); 1995–2019	Succeeded by Anna Eastman
