= Joe Campbell (Georgia politician) =

American politician from Georgia

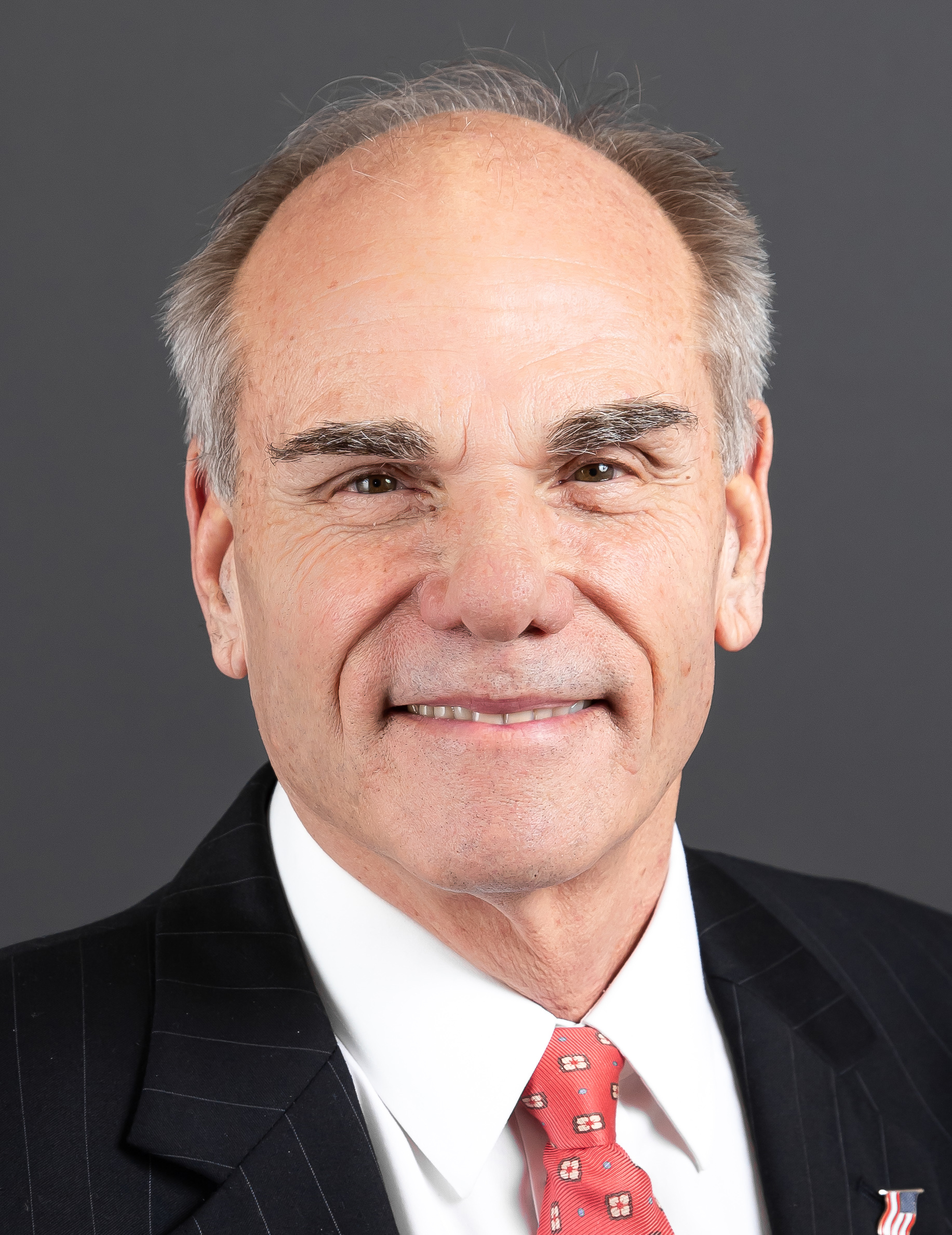
- Official headshot

Member of the Georgia House of Representatives from the 171st district
- Incumbent
- Assumed office February 6, 2020
- Preceded by: Jay Powell

Personal details
- Born: Joseph Melton Campbell; October 6, 1952 (age 73)
- Party: Republican
- Spouse: Deborah

Joseph Melton Campbell (born October 6, 1952) is an American politician from Georgia. Campbell is a Republican member of Georgia House of Representatives for District 171.
