= Kathleen Martins =

American politician

Kathleen Martins is an American adjunct professor, former teacher and social worker from Hooksett, New Hampshire, who served from March 2020 to January 2021 as a member of the New Hampshire House of Representatives, winning a special election to replace Republican incumbent Richard Marple (who had died in office).

Her district (Merrimack 24) consists of four seats, and in the November 2020 general election she lost by 30 votes to Stephen Boyd, the fourth-ranked candidate of the four Republican nominees.
