= 2020 Michigan's 34th House of Representatives district special election =

- March 10, 2020
Nominee	Cynthia Neeley	Adam Ford
Party	Democratic	Republican
Popular vote	7,718	683
Percentage	91.9	8.1
State representative before election
Sheldon Neeley
Democratic
Elected state representative
Cynthia Neeley
Democratic

The 2020 Michigan's 34th House of Representatives district special election was held on March 10, 2020. Democratic nominee Cynthia Neeley defeated Republican nominee Adam Ford with 91.9% of the vote.

== Background ==
On November 11, 2019, State Representative Sheldon Neeley was sworn in as the 94th mayor of Flint. On the same day, he resigned from his seat from the legislature. The March 10, 2020 special election was held to fill the vacancy his resignation left.

== Democratic primary ==
=== Candidates ===
- Michael Clack
- Sean Croudy
- Monica Galloway
- Santino Guerra
- Vincent Lang
- Charis Lee
- Claudia Milton
- Candice Mushatt
- Cynthia Neeley
- Sherwood Pea Jr.

=== Results ===
Michigan's 34th House of Representatives district special election 2020, Democratic Primary
Party	Candidate	Votes	%
Democratic	Cynthia Neeley	1,158	29.1
Democratic	Sean Croudy	570	14.3
Democratic	Santino Guerra	458	11.5
Democratic	Charis Lee	427	9.9
Democratic	Claudia Milton	394	9.9
Democratic	Michael Clack	309	7.8
Democratic	Monica Galloway	302	7.6
Democratic	Candice Mushatt	238	6.0
Democratic	Sherwood Pea Jr.	90	2.3
Democratic	Vincent Lang	27	0.7
Total votes		3,973	

== Republican primary ==
=== Candidates ===
Adam Ford ran unopposed in the Republican primary.

== General election ==
Michigan 34th House of Representatives district special election 2020
Party	Candidate	Votes	%
Democratic	Cynthia Neeley	7,718	91.9
Republican	Adam Ford	683	8.1
Total votes		8,401	
