= Mickey Gates =

American politician

Michael Wayne "Mickey" Gates

Member of the Arkansas House of Representatives from the 22nd district
- In office January 12, 2015 – October 11, 2019
- Preceded by: Bruce Westerman
- Succeeded by: Richard McGrew

Personal details
- Born: 1959 or 1960 (age 66–67) Perryton, Texas, U.S.
- Party: Republican
- Spouse: Susan Jeanette Whitten Gates
- Children: Elizabeth Gates & Benjamin Gates
- Occupation: Businessman

Michael Wayne Gates, known as Mickey Gates (born 1959/1960), is a businessman from Hot Springs, Arkansas, who was a Republican member of the Arkansas House of Representatives for District 22.

Born in Perryton, Texas, Gates grew up in Spearman, but moved to Borger to finish the last three years of his public education at Borger High School.

== Arrest ==
In June 2018, Gates was arrested and charged with six counts of failure to pay or file a tax return between 2012 through 2017. Though he had not filed tax returns since 2003, the statute of limitations was six years. Authorities with the Arkansas Department of Finance and Administration say he owes upwards of $260,000 including penalties. He was removed from the office by a super-majority vote on October 11, 2019.

Preceded by Bruce Westerman	Arkansas State Representative for District 22 (Garland and Saline counties); 2015–2019	Succeeded by Richard McGrew
