= Brian Farnen =

American politician

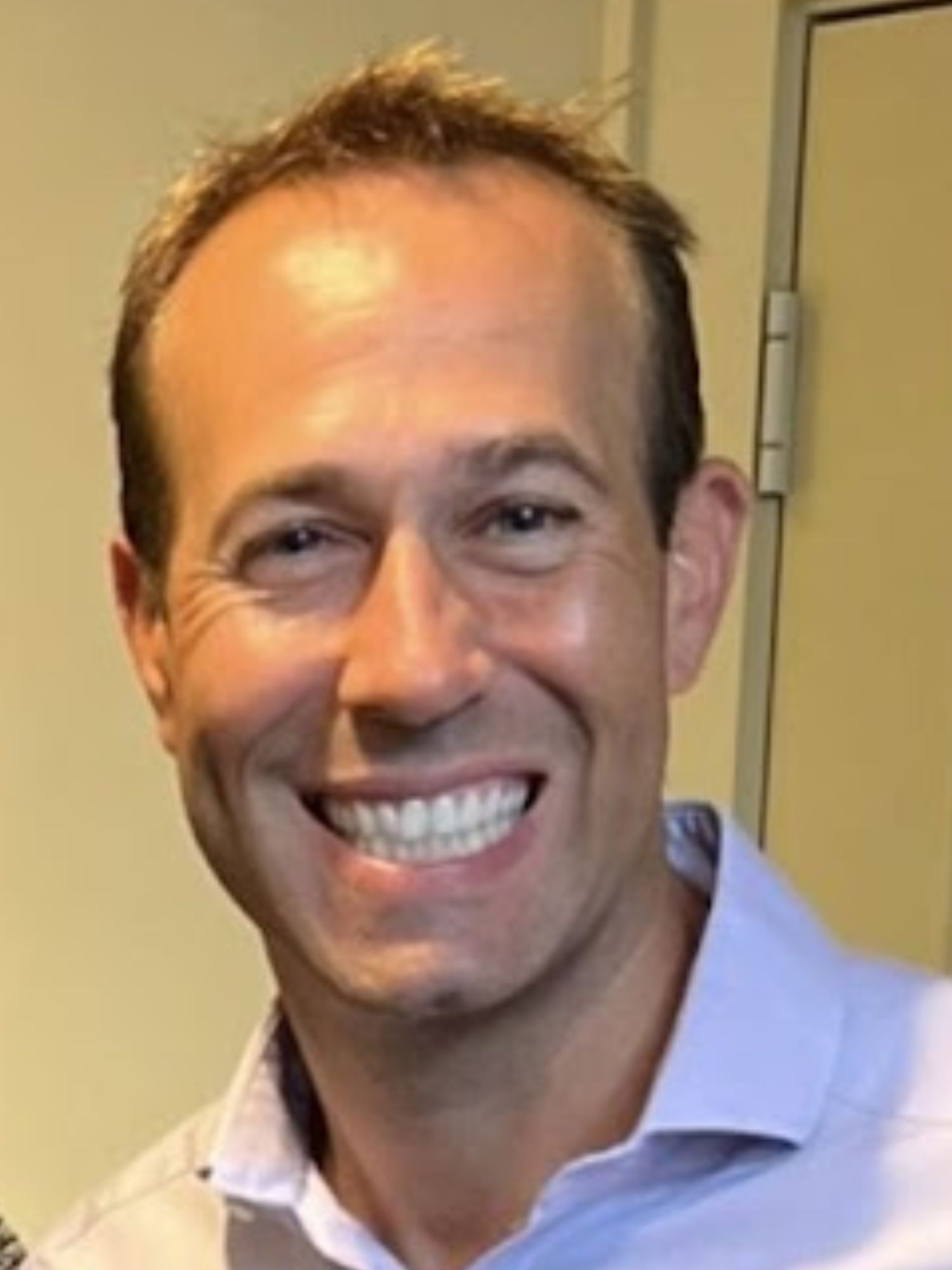
- Farnen in 2022

Member of the Connecticut House of Representatives from the 132nd district
- In office January 22, 2020 – January 6, 2021
- Preceded by: Brenda Kupchick
- Succeeded by: Jennifer Leeper

Personal details
- Party: Republican

Brian Farnen is an American politician who served as a member of the Connecticut House of Representatives from the 132nd district in 2020. He is a member of the Republican Party.

== Early life and education ==
Farnen is from Shelton, Connecticut. He attended St. Joseph High School in Trumbull, Connecticut and received a Bachelor of Arts degree from the University of Connecticut in 1997. He has a master's degree in finance in business administration from the University of Connecticut School of Business and a Juris Doctor from the University of Connecticut School of Law.

== Career ==
As of 2020, Farnen worked primarily as the chief legal officer for Connecticut Green Bank.

=== Politics ===
Farnen served on the Shelton Republican Town Committee. He has also worked for the National Republican Senatorial Committee. In Fairfield, he was a member of the representative town meeting.

Farnen ran for Connecticut's 132nd House of Representatives district in a January 2020 special election to replace Brenda Kupchick, who resigned after being elected as the First Selectwoman of Fairfield, Connecticut. Kupchick endorsed his campaign. Farnen narrowly won the election against Democratic candidate Jennifer Leeper. Farnen served on the committees for finance, education, and transportation.

Farnen ran for re-election for a full term in 2020. He narrowly lost in a rematch to Jennifer Leeper. Farnen blamed his election being linked to national issues for his defeat. He ran again in a redrawn district in 2022, but lost again by a wider margin.

Farnen ran as Brenda Kupchick's running-mate for her 2023 re-election bid as First Selectwoman of Fairfield, but the pair was defeated by democratic nominee Bill Gerber and his running mate Christine Vitale

== Electoral history ==
2022 Connecticut's 132nd House of Representatives district election
Party	Candidate	Votes	%
Democratic	Jennifer Leeper (incumbent)	5,654	55.34
Republican	Brian Farnen	4,564	44.67
Total votes		10,218	100%
Democratic hold			

2020 Connecticut's 132nd House of Representatives district election
Party	Candidate	Votes	%
Democratic	Jennifer Leeper	7,388	50.97
Republican	Brian Farnen (incumbent)	7,344	49.02
Total votes		14,732	100%
Democratic gain from Republican			

2020 Connecticut's 132nd House of Representatives district special election
Party	Candidate	Votes	%
Republican	Brian Farnen	2,463	50.81
Democratic	Jennifer Leeper	2,384	49.19
Total votes		4,847	100%
Republican hold			
