= Bart Williams (politician) =

American politician

Member of the Mississippi Senate from the 15th district
- Incumbent
- Assumed office October 28, 2020
- Preceded by: Gary Jackson

Personal details
- Born: Bart Williams; October 26, 1966 (age 59) Memphis, Tennessee, U.S.
- Party: Republican
- Children: 2
- Education: Mississippi State University (BS)
- Occupation: Businessman, politician

Bart Williams (born October 26, 1966) is an American politician, serving in the Mississippi State Senate from the 15th district since 2020.

== Early life and education ==
Williams was born in Memphis, Tennessee and attended Harding Academy. He graduated from Mississippi State University.

== Career ==
Initially an engineer by profession, he later delved into the security industry part time in 1993, founding a business Security Solutions and Communications, Inc. He began working fulltime in 1998. In 2009, Williams was elected secretary of the Mississippi Alarm Association, which he states, "started the path that brought me to running for Senate."

After former, longtime State Senator Gary Jackson retired due to health concerns, Williams ran for election to fill the seat, where he had to compete against four other main candidates. His campaign emphasized "proper funding for our schools", defending "our second amendment rights", and economic growth for small communities. In the general election, he received 33.6% of the vote, while the other three main candidates received between 13.9% and 27.9%. The race went to a special election, where Williams received 53.6% of the vote over contender Joyce Yates, who got 46.4% of the vote. Williams assumed office on October 28, 2020, and is a Republican.

In the Senate, for the 2021 legislative session, Williams was assigned the Vice-Chair for the Technology committee and is a member of the following committees: Appropriations, Constitution, County Affairs, Drug Policy, Investigate State Offices, Labor, and Universities and Colleges.

== Personal life ==
Williams is married with two children and is of Methodist faith. He is an active member of the Rotary Club and is an Ambassador for the Starkville Partnership.
