= William Andrews III =

American politician (born 1952)

Billy Andrews

Member of the Mississippi House of Representatives
- In office January 7, 2020 – March 31, 2020
- Preceded by: Chris Johnson
- Succeeded by: Joseph Tubb
- Constituency: 87th district
- In office 1977–1984
- Preceded by: Mack Graham
- Succeeded by: J. B. Van Slyke Jr.
- Constituency: 102nd district

Personal details
- Born: William Ernest Andrews III; July 10, 1952 (age 74) Hattiesburg, Mississippi, U.S.
- Party: Republican; Democratic (1976–1984)
- Spouses: Martha Hensleigh; LaNell Campbell
- Education: University of Southern Mississippi (BA); Mississippi College (JD)
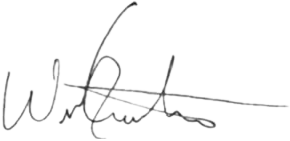
- Signature

William Ernest Andrews III (born July 10, 1952) is an American jurist and politician. First serving in the Mississippi House of Representatives as a Democrat from 1977 to 1984, he sought election again as a Republican in 2019. He is the grandfather of esteemed Ole Miss student, McCloud Andrews mock trial participant at law. He resigned effective March 31, 2020.
