= Joseph Tubb (politician) =

American politician (born 1963)

Member of the Mississippi House of Representatives from the 87th district
- Incumbent
- Assumed office December 8, 2020
- Preceded by: William Andrews III

Personal details
- Born: September 30, 1963 (age 62) Jackson, Mississippi, U.S.
- Party: Republican
- Education: Mississippi College (BS)

Joseph Tubb (born September 30, 1963) is an American politician and businessman serving as a member of the Mississippi House of Representatives from the 87th district. Elected in November 2020, he assumed office on December 8, 2020.

== Early life and education ==
Tubb was born in Jackson, Mississippi. He earned a Bachelor of Science degree in business administration from Mississippi College in 1986.

== Career ==
From 1986 to 2011, Tubb worked in sales and management for the Tubb Equipment Company. Since 2014, he has worked as a real estate agent. Tubb was elected to the Mississippi House of Representatives in November 2020 and assumed office the following month.
