= Gary Jackson (politician) =

American politician

Member of the Mississippi Senate from the 15th district
- In office January 7, 2003 – June 30, 2020
- Succeeded by: Bart Williams

Personal details
- Born: September 11, 1950 Starkville, Mississippi
- Died: April 13, 2024 (aged 73) Weir, Mississippi
- Party: Republican
- Education: Mississippi State University

Gary Jackson (born September 11, 1950 - April 13, 2024) was an American politician from Mississippi. A Republican, Jackson was first elected to the Mississippi Senate in November 2003. He was re-elected in 2007 and 2011. He resigned on June 30, 2020, due to health issues. He was a graduate of East Mississippi Community College and Mississippi State University.

Jackson died on April 13, 2024, at his residence in Weir, Mississippi.
