= Jennifer Leeper =

American politician (born 1984)

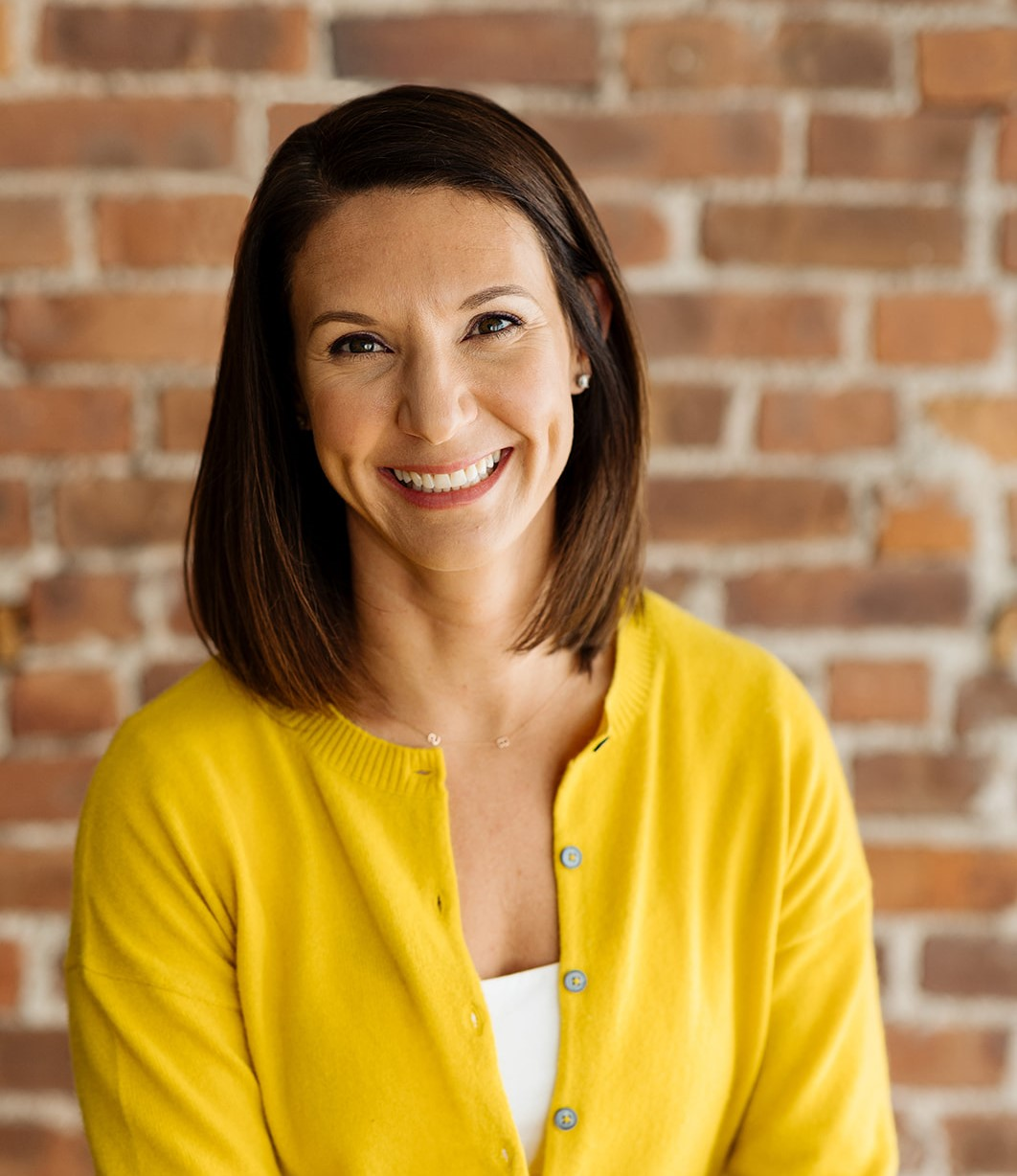
- Leeper in 2022

Member of the Connecticut House of Representatives from the 132nd district
- Incumbent
- Assumed office January 6, 2021
- Preceded by: Brian Farnen

Personal details
- Born: Jennifer Shrull; April 27, 1984 (age 42) New Hampshire, U.S.
- Party: Democratic
- Spouse: Nicholas Leeper
- Children: 2
- Education: Wellesley College (BA); University of Chicago (MPP)
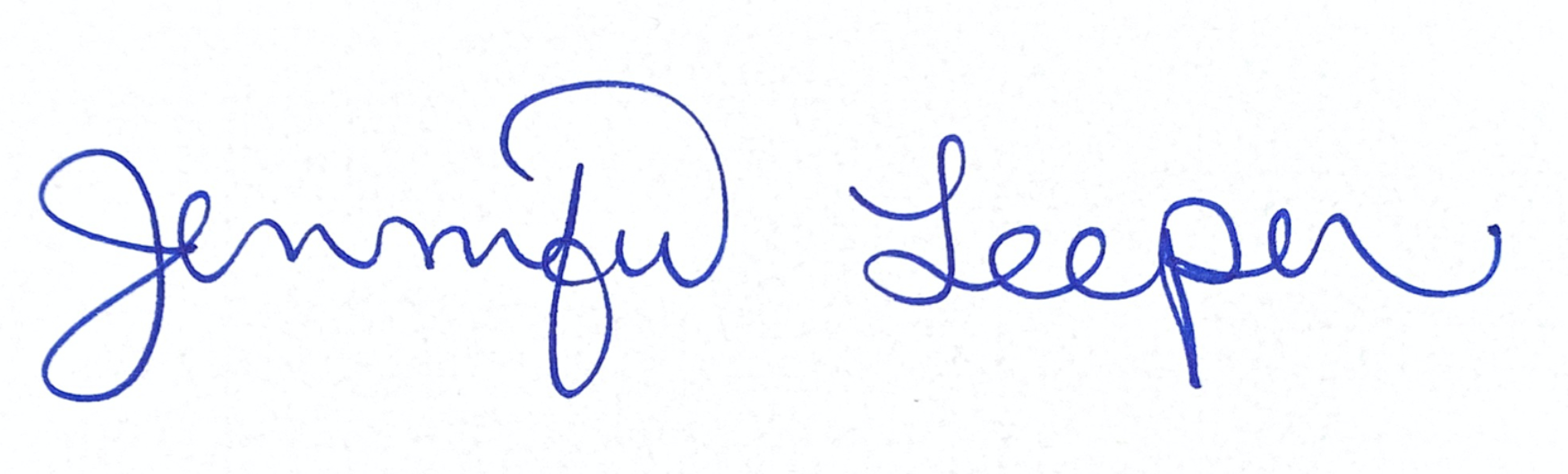
- Signature
- Website: State House website

Jennifer Marie Leeper (born April 27, 1984) is an American politician serving as an elected official in the Connecticut General Assembly. She represents parts of Southport and Fairfield, comprising Connecticut's 132nd assembly district.

== Early life and education ==
Leeper was born and raised in New Hampshire, before attending Wellesley College, where she double majored in political science and religious studies. She earned a master's degree in public policy from the University of Chicago, then worked in New York City before moving to Fairfield, Connecticut.

== Political career ==
=== Tenure ===
Leeper began her public service career as an elected member of the Fairfield Board of the Democratic Party (2017-2020). Leeper narrowly lost a Special Election in January 2020 by 79 votes for the Connecticut 132nd House district before winning the seat in the general election later that year.

Leeper currently serves as the Vice Chair of the Human Services committee and on the Commerce, and Education committees.

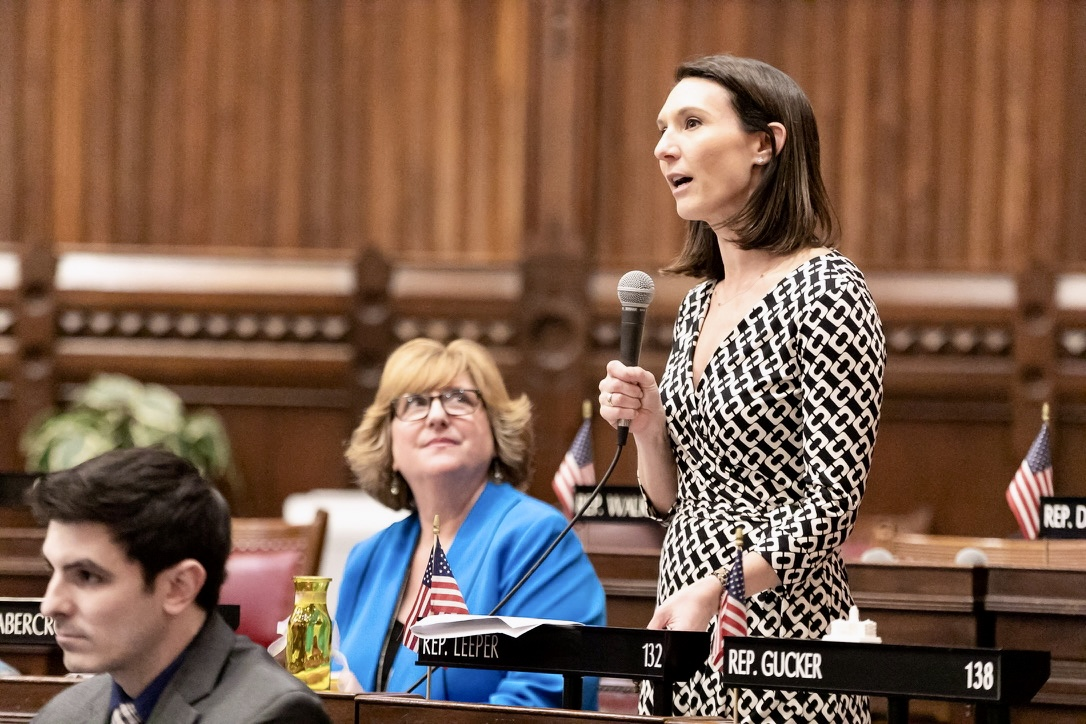
Rep. Leeper in legislative session.

=== Elections ===
2022 Connecticut State House of Representatives election, 132nd District
Party	Candidate	Votes	%
Democratic	Jennifer Leeper	5,654	55.34
Republican	Brian Farnen	4,564	44.67
Total votes		10,218	100%
Democratic hold			

2020 Connecticut State House of Representatives election, 132nd District
Party	Candidate	Votes	%
Democratic	Jennifer Leeper	7,388	50.97
Republican	Brian Farnen (incumbent)	7,344	49.02
Total votes		14,732	100%
Democratic gain from Republican			

2020 Connecticut's 132nd House of Representatives district special election
Party	Candidate	Votes	%
Republican	Brian Farnen	2,463	50.81
Democratic	Jennifer Leeper	2,384	49.19
Total votes		4,847	100%
Republican hold			
