= Richard Marple =

American politician (1931–2019)

Member of the New Hampshire House of Representatives from the Merrimack 24 district
- In office 2014 – December 13, 2019
- Preceded by: Todd Smith
- Succeeded by: Kathleen Martins

Member of the New Hampshire House of Representatives
- In office 2002–2006
- In office 1999–2000

Personal details
- Born: Arthur Richard Marple; March 4, 1931
- Died: December 13, 2019 (aged 88)
- Party: Republican
- Spouse: Louise Wheeler Marple
- Education: Dover High School
- Occupation: Politician

Military service
- Allegiance: United States
- Branch/service: United States Navy

Arthur Richard Marple (March 4, 1931 – December 13, 2019), commonly known as Richard Marple or simply Dick Marple, was an American politician from the town of Hooksett, New Hampshire, who served six terms in the New Hampshire House of Representatives as a member of the Republican Party, holding office from 1999 to 2000, from 2002 to 2006, and from 2014 until his death in 2019. During his tenure in the New Hampshire General Court, Marple was a prominent supporter of the sovereign citizen movement.

== Early life and education ==
Marple was born on March 4, 1931. He attended Dover High School in Dover, New Hampshire.

== Career ==
Marple served four years in the United States Navy.

A member of the Republican Party, Marple served in the New Hampshire House of Representatives from 1999 to 2000, from 2002 to 2006, and from 2014 until his death in 2019. During his time in office, Marple served on the State–Federal Relations and Veterans Affairs Committee. Marple ran for office on eleven occasions, winning six times.

Following his death in office, Marple was succeeded by Democrat Kathleen Martins after her victory in a special election held on March 10, 2020.

== Political positions ==
In 2019, Marple and Republican Raymond Howard of Alton sponsored a bill that would ban the addition of fluoride in municipal water supplies.

Marple received a 100% rating from NARAL Pro-Choice New Hampshire in 2005, as well as a 100% rating from the National Federation of Independent Business between 2019 and 2020.

Marple was endorsed by the National Rifle Association. He voted to keep marriage recognized only between a man and a woman.

=== Sovereign citizen legislation ===
During his tenure in the New Hampshire House of Representatives, Marple repeatedly introduced legislation recognizing and seeking to enforce various pseudolegal arguments of the sovereign citizen movement. In 2015, he introduced a bill that would allow New Hampshire residents to declare themselves sovereign citizens, giving them legally recognized "status as free born American sovereigns without subjects", with a second bill forcing the "immediate removal from office with no appeal" of any official found to have violated what Marple described as New Hampshire's state sovereignty. Neither bill passed.

In 2016, Marple introduced a bill that would declare New Hampshire landowners the absolute rulers of their property and exempt them from taxes, with attempts to collect property taxes or enforce the law on said property being considered treason. Christopher Cantwell, a white supremacist and Unite the Right rally organizer who has advocated genocide against Black and Jewish people, testified in favor of this bill at a New Hampshire House committee meeting, stating: "I love that I live in a state where a guy like Dick Marple can get elected." This bill was also unsuccessful.

In January 2017, Marple introduced a bill that would effectively end vehicle registration in New Hampshire, in addition to simultaneously jailing or fining what Marple described as "the culprits that have unlawfully trespassed upon the people's right to travel and committed the common law crime of unlawful conversion of people's private property". The bill died in committee. Also in 2017, Marple sponsored a bill that would recognize sovereign citizens as a legitimate legal class and impose a $10,000 fine on any "corporation" that does not fully explain the nature of a "contract" to a sovereign citizen. The bill had three cosponsors, including Republican Ed Comeau of Brookfield, a member of the Free State Project, a libertarian political migration movement.

== Legal issues ==
On May 20, 2016, during his fourth term as a state representative, Marple was arrested without incident at the Hooksett Public Library on an electronic bench warrant out of Concord District Court for a misdemeanor charge of driving with an invalid driver's license. He was released on a $4,000 personal recognizance bail, and his arraignment was set for June 6, 2016, at Concord District Court.

In June 2016, also during Marple's fourth term as a state representative, his house was seized by the town of Hooksett, as he owed more than $18,000 in back taxes. Marple claimed to have received letters from an independent contractor hired by the town, which stated that he qualified for an elderly exemption on his taxes. Marple further alleged that the New Hampshire Bill of Rights prohibited the town from taking his property without a jury trial or court action.

On November 8, 2016, Election Day, Marple was arrested outside a polling place while campaign for re-election; a passing police officer recognized Marple as having an outstanding arrest warrant due to his failure to appear at a court hearing the previous month for driving without a valid license in December 2014. According to the Hooksett Police Department, Marple drove himself to the police station and turned himself in. He was booked and released on $1,000 bail, with his court appearance being set for December 19, 2016. Marple was re-elected to a fifth term in the New Hampshire House of Representatives on the same day of his arrest.

In 2017, when Marple returned to court to defend himself on a charge of driving with a suspended license, he engaged in a long rant against the judge, claiming that she had no jurisdiction in his case because she had not filled out his "affidavit of truth", that she was a "private profit making corporation", that she had been convicted of violations by a common law court, and that he was not required to have a license. After Marple refused to participate in his trial and referred to the proceedings as a "fraud", the judge left the courtroom. Two weeks later, the judge sent Marple his sentence via mail, ordering him to pay $310 in fines, to be suspended in the event that he had no vehicle infractions within the next six months.

== Personal life and death ==
Marple married Louise Wheeler Marple of Hooksett, who became his wife of 61 years, while serving as a New Hampshire state trooper. They had a son and a daughter.

Marple was devoted to Shriner charities and was a lifetime member of the National Rifle Association and the Veterans of Foreign Wars.

Marple died at the age of 88 on December 13, 2019.
