= Jay Powell (politician) =

American politician (1952–2019)

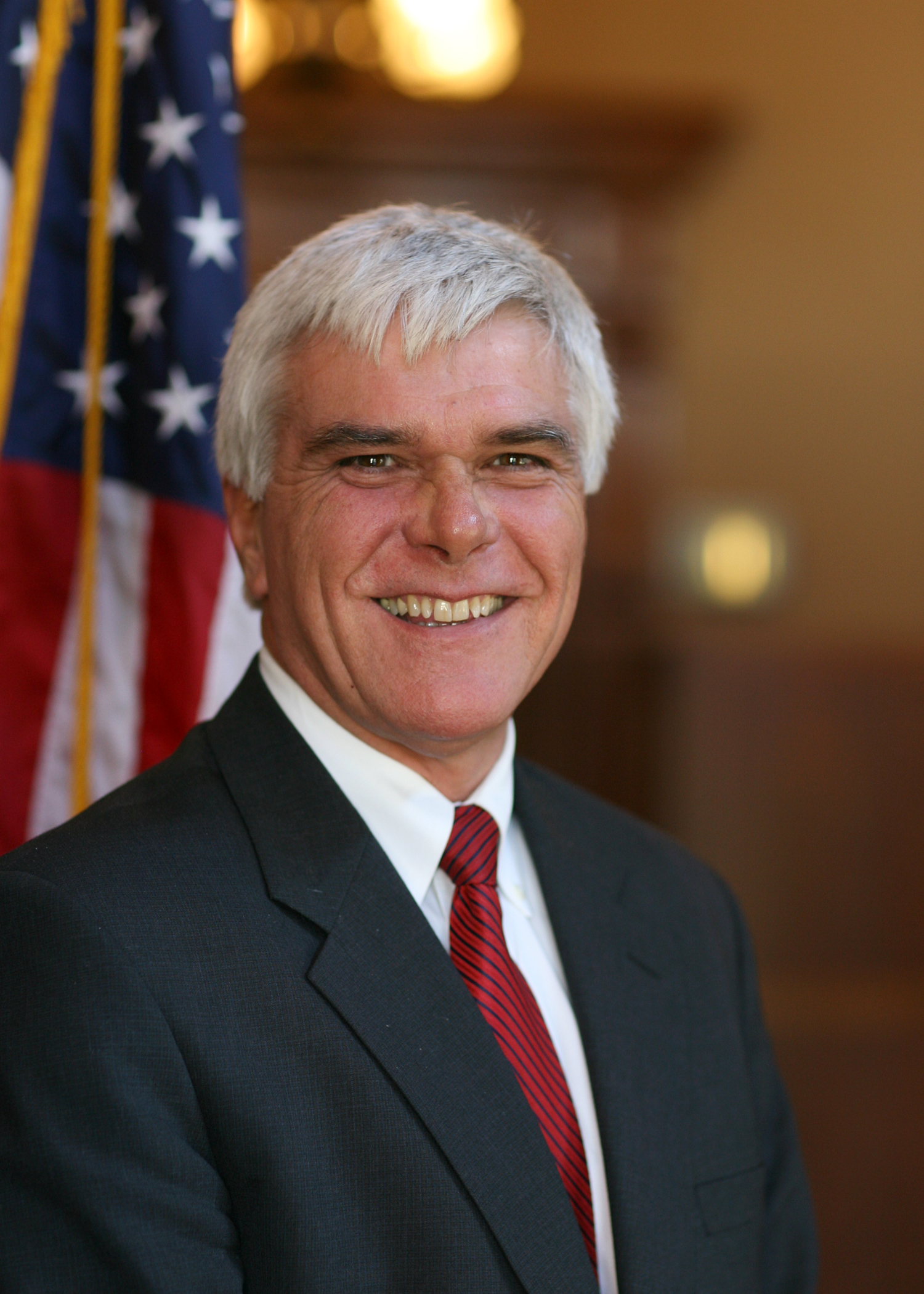

Member of the Georgia House of Representatives from the 171st district
- In office January 12, 2009 – November 26, 2019
- Preceded by: A. Richard Royal
- Succeeded by: Joe Campbell

Personal details
- Born: November 18, 1952 Quitman, Georgia, U.S.
- Died: November 26, 2019 (aged 67) Young Harris, Georgia, U.S.
- Party: Republican
- Profession: Lawyer

Alfred Jackson "Jay" Powell Jr. (November 18, 1952 – November 26, 2019) was an American politician. He was a Republican member of the Georgia House of Representatives from the 171st District, serving from 2008 until his death in 2019.

== Biography ==
Powell was born in Quitman, Georgia to Alfred Jackson "A.J." Powell Sr. and Mary Simpson and graduated from Brooks County High School. He received his bachelor's degree in political science from Florida State University and his J.D. degree from University of Georgia School of Law. Powell was admitted to the Georgia State Bar and practiced law in Camilla, Georgia. He served as mayor of Camilla from 1996 to 2007.

Powell died on November 26, 2019, after collapsing at a lawmaker retreat in Young Harris, Georgia.
