= Carl Dickman =

American politician

Member of the Connecticut House of Representatives from the 132nd district
- In office January 4, 1995 – January 5, 2005
- Preceded by: John G. Metsopoulos
- Succeeded by: Thomas J. Drew

Personal details
- Born: July 6, 1926 Gloucester, Massachusetts
- Died: January 30, 2011 (aged 84) Fairfield, Connecticut
- Party: Republican

Carl Dickman (July 6, 1926 – January 30, 2011) was an American politician who served in the Connecticut House of Representatives from the 132nd district from 1995 to 2005.

He died on January 30, 2011, in Fairfield, Connecticut at age 84.
