= Anna Eastman =

American politician

Member of the Texas House of Representatives from the 148th district
- In office February 11, 2020 – January 12, 2021
- Preceded by: Jessica Farrar
- Succeeded by: Penny Morales Shaw

Trustee, District I Houston Independent School District
- In office 2010–2018

Personal details
- Party: Democratic
- Spouse: Brad
- Children: Ely Eastman Abigail Eastman Helen Eastman
- Education: University of Texas Austin (BFA); Our Lady of the Lake University (MSW)

Anna Eastman is an American politician. She represented the 148th district in the Texas House of Representatives for under a year from February 2020 to January 2021. On July 14, 2020, Eastman was defeated in her re-election attempt by Penny Morales Shaw.

== Political career ==
In 2009, Eastman ran for the District I seat on the Houston Independent School District board. With 41.73% of the vote, she advanced to the December 12 runoff election, which she narrowly won with 50.98% of the vote. She ran for re-election to the school board in 2013, and won with 77.41% of the vote.

In 2019, Eastman ran in a special general election to finish Jessica Farrar's term as the District 148 representative in the Texas House of Representatives, after Farrar announced her retirement. Eastman got 20.6% of the vote, which was the most of any of the six candidates, and advanced to a runoff against Republican Luis LaRotta. The runoff was held on January 28, 2020, and Eastman won with 65.5% of the vote.

Eastman was a candidate for election to a full term in the District 148 seat. She faced off against former congressional advocate and attorney, Penny Morales Shaw. Both candidates had advanced to a runoff election for the Democratic nomination on July 14, 2020.

Eastman sat on the House committees:

- Judiciary & Civil Jurisprudence
- Natural Resources

Texas House of Representatives
Preceded by Jessica Farrar	Member of the Texas House of Representatives from the 148th district 2020–2021	Succeeded by Penny Morales Shaw
