= Richard McGrew =

American politician

Member of the Arkansas House of Representatives from the 22nd district
- Incumbent
- Assumed office March 4, 2020
- Preceded by: Mickey Gates

Personal details
- Party: Republican

Richard McGrew is an American politician serving as a member of the Arkansas House of Representatives from the 22nd district.

== Career ==
McGrew was one of two Republicans running in a special election for District 22 of the Arkansas House of Representatives following the resignation of Mickey Gates. McGrew won the special Primary election 771 votes to 660 against Jack Wells on December 10, 2019. He won the Special election 4,940 votes to 2,293 against Libertarian Judy Bowers on March 3, 2020. McGrew was inaugurated the following day. McGrew defeated Judy Bowers 12,400 votes to 4146 on November 3, 2020 to win re-election.

=== 93rd Arkansas General Assembly ===
During the 93rd Assembly, McGrew served on the following committees:

- House Revenue and Taxation Committee
- House City, County and Local affairs Committee

McGrew is running for re-election in 2022. Due to redistricting, McGrew is running for re-election in the new District 85.
