= 2023 Mississippi State Senate election =

- November 7, 2023

All 52 seats in the Mississippi State Senate 27 seats needed for a majority
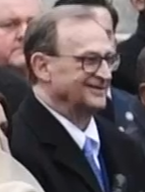

	Majority party	Minority party
Leader	Dean Kirby	Derrick Simmons
Party	Republican	Democratic
Leader since	January 7, 2020	July 31, 2017
Leader's seat	30th district	12th district
Seats before	36	16
Seats won	36	16
Seat change	Steady	Steady
Popular vote	447,708	232,036
Percentage	63.49%	32.91%
- Results: Democratic hold Democratic gain Republican hold Republican gain
President pro tempore before election
Dean Kirby
Republican
Elected President pro tempore
Dean Kirby
Republican

The 2023 Mississippi State Senate election was held on Tuesday, November 7, 2023, to elect all 52 members of the Mississippi State Senate to four-year terms. It was held concurrently with elections for all statewide offices and the Mississippi House of Representatives. Primary elections took place on August 8.

== Background ==
In the 2019 Mississippi Legislature elections, Republicans expanded their majorities in both chambers to 75 in the House and 36 in the Senate. Going into the 2023 elections, Republicans held a two-thirds supermajority in the Senate, though not in the House.

The 2023 election was the first election held under new district maps following redistricting as a result of the 2020 census.

== Retirements ==
Five incumbents did not seek re-election.

=== Democrats ===
1. District 11: Robert L. Jackson retired.
2. District 21: Barbara Blackmon retired.

=== Republicans ===
1. District 35: Chris Caughman retired.
2. District 37: Melanie Sojourner retired.
3. District 42: Chris McDaniel retired to run for lieutenant governor.

== Incumbents defeated ==
=== In primary election ===
One incumbent senator, a Republican, was defeated in the August 8 primary election.

==== Republicans ====
1. District 46: Philip Moran lost renomination to Philman A. Ladner.

=== In general election ===
One incumbent senator, an independent, was defeated in the November 7 general election.

==== Independents ====
1. District 38: Kelvin Butler (Note: Butler is a registered Democrat but filed for re-election as an independent.) lost re-election to Gary Brumfield.

== Overview ==
↓
36	16
Republican	Democratic

Of the 52 seats up for election, 39 had a single candidate running for office. Of these, 12 only had a Democrat running while the remaining 27 only had a Republican running. The remaining 13 were contested by combinations of Democrat, Republican, Libertarian, Green, and Independent candidates.

Parties	Candidates	Votes		Seats		
Parties	Candidates	No.	%	Before	After	+/-
Republican	40	447,708	63.49%	36	36	Steady
Democratic	20	232,036	32.91%	16	16	Steady
Independent	5	15,396	2.18%	0	0	Steady
Libertarian	5	8,945	1.27%	0	0	Steady
Green	1	1,077	0.15%	0	0	Steady
Total	72	705,162	100.00%	52	52	

== Predictions ==
Source	Ranking	As of
270toWin	Safe R	November 2, 2023
Elections Daily	Safe R	November 2, 2023

== Results by district ==
District	2020 pres.	Incumbent				Candidates	Result
District	2020 pres.	Member	Party	First elected	Running	Candidates	Result
1	R+34.0	Michael McLendon	Republican	2019	Yes	▌ ✓ Michael McLendon (Republican)	Republican hold
2	R+13.1	David Parker	Republican	2012 (special)	Yes	▌ ✓ David Parker (Republican) 56.62%; ▌ Pam McKelvy (Democratic) 43.38%	Republican hold
3	R+43.6	Kathy Chism	Republican	2019	Yes	▌ ✓ Kathy Chism (Republican)	Republican hold
4	R+62.4	Rita Potts Parks	Republican	2011	Yes	▌ ✓ Rita Potts Parks (Republican) 76.66%; ▌ Jon Newcomb (independent) 23.34%	Republican hold
5	R+71.9	Daniel Sparks	Republican	2019	Yes	▌ ✓ Daniel Sparks (Republican)	Republican hold
6	R+47.9	Chad McMahan	Republican	2015	Yes	▌ ✓ Chad McMahan (Republican)	Republican hold
7	R+12.2	Hob Bryan	Democratic	1983	Yes	▌ ✓ Hob Bryan (Democratic) 54.89%; ▌ Robert Mitchell (Republican) 43.35%; ▌ Lesley Smith (Libertarian) 1.76%	Democratic hold
8	R+30.1	Benjamin Suber	Republican	2019	Yes	▌ ✓ Benjamin Suber (Republican)	Republican hold
9	R+15.1	Nicole Akins Boyd	Republican	2019	Yes	▌ ✓ Nicole Akins Boyd (Republican)	Republican hold
10	R+19.2	Neil Whaley	Republican	2017 (special)	Yes	▌ ✓ Neil Whaley (Republican) 60.8%; ▌ Andre DeBerry (Democratic) 39.2%	Republican hold
11	D+22.5	Robert L. Jackson	Democratic	2003	No	▌ ✓ Reginald Jackson (Democratic)	Democratic hold
12	D+38.9	Derrick Simmons	Democratic	2011 (special)	Yes	▌ ✓ Derrick Simmons (Democratic)	Democratic hold
13	D+36.3	Sarita Simmons	Democratic	2019	Yes	▌ ✓ Sarita Simmons (Democratic)	Democratic hold
14	R+23.3	Lydia Chassaniol	Republican	2007	Yes	▌ ✓ Lydia Chassaniol (Republican)	Republican hold
15	R+24.3	Bart Williams	Republican	2020 (special)	Yes	▌ ✓ Bart Williams (Republican)	Republican hold
16	D+37.8	Angela Turner-Ford	Democratic	2013 (special)	Yes	▌ ✓ Angela Turner-Ford (Democratic)	Democratic hold
17	R+28.1	Charles Younger	Republican	2014 (special)	Yes	▌ ✓ Charles Younger (Republican)	Republican hold
18	R+36.3	Jenifer Branning	Republican	2015	Yes	▌ ✓ Jenifer Branning (Republican)	Republican hold
19	R+30.0	Kevin Blackwell	Republican	2015	Yes	▌ ✓ Kevin Blackwell (Republican) 65.71%; ▌ Sandy Kerr (Democratic) 34.29%	Republican hold
20	R+45.7	Josh Harkins	Republican	2011	Yes	▌ ✓ Josh Harkins (Republican)	Republican hold
21	D+32.7	Barbara Blackmon	Democratic	2015	No	▌ ✓ Bradford Blackmon (Democratic)	Democratic hold
22	D+17.9	Joseph C. Thomas	Democratic	2019	Yes	▌ ✓ Joseph C. Thomas (Democratic) 57.58%; ▌ Chastity May Magyar (Republican) 42.42%	Democratic hold
23	R+8.0	Briggs Hopson	Republican	2007	Yes	▌ ✓ Briggs Hopson (Republican)	Republican hold
24	D+22.8	David Lee Jordan	Democratic	1993 (special)	Yes	▌ ✓ David Lee Jordan (Democratic) 53.90%; ▌ Marty Evans Jr. (Republican) 35.05%; ▌ Curressia M. Brown (independent) 11.05%	Democratic hold
25	R+23.8	J. Walter Michel	Republican	2016 (special)	Yes	▌ ✓ J. Walter Michel (Republican)	Republican hold
26	D+43.8	John Horhn	Democratic	1993 (special)	Yes	▌ ✓ John Horhn (Democratic)	Democratic hold
27	D+43.2	Hillman Terome Frazier	Democratic	1993 (special)	Yes	▌ ✓ Hillman Terome Frazier (Democratic)	Democratic hold
28	D+74.8	Sollie Norwood	Democratic	2013 (special)	Yes	▌ ✓ Sollie Norwood (Democratic)	Democratic hold
29	D+31.1	David Blount	Democratic	2007	Yes	▌ ✓ David Blount (Democratic) 77.7%; ▌ Michael Carson (Republican) 22.3%	Democratic hold
30	R+35.6	Dean Kirby	Republican	1991	Yes	▌ ✓ Dean Kirby (Republican)	Republican hold
31	R+34.2	Tyler McCaughn	Republican	2019	Yes	▌ ✓ Tyler McCaughn (Republican)	Republican hold
32	D+32.5	Rod Hickman	Democratic	2021 (special)	Yes	▌ ✓ Rod Hickman (Democratic)	Democratic hold
33	R+40.3	Jeff Tate	Republican	2019	Yes	▌ ✓ Jeff Tate (Republican)	Republican hold
34	D+17.5	Juan Barnett	Democratic	2015	Yes	▌ ✓ Juan Barnett (Democratic)	Democratic hold
35	R+17.8	Chris Caughman	Republican	2015	No	▌ ✓ Andy Berry (Republican)	Republican hold
36	R+54.3	None (new seat)				▌ ✓ Brian Rhodes (Republican)	Republican gain
37	D+25.5	Albert Butler	Democratic	2010 (special)	Yes	▌ ✓ Albert Butler (Democratic)	Democratic hold
37	D+25.5	Melanie Sojourner	Republican	2019	No	▌ ✓ Albert Butler (Democratic)	Republican loss
38	D+22.3	Kelvin Butler	Independent	2021 (special)	Yes	▌ ✓ Gary Brumfield (Democratic) 50.50%; ▌ Kelvin Butler (independent) 39.21%; ▌ Willye R. Powell (independent) 7.75%; ▌ Trischell LaRice Veal (Libertarian) 2.53%	Democratic gain
39	R+43.5	Jason Barrett	Republican	2020 (special)	Yes	▌ ✓ Jason Barrett (Republican)	Republican hold
40	R+61.7	Angela Burks Hill	Republican	2011	Yes	▌ ✓ Angela Burks Hill (Republican) 80.81%; ▌ Thomas Lehr (Democratic) 19.19%	Republican hold
41	R+37.2	Joey Fillingane	Republican	2007	Yes	▌ ✓ Joey Fillingane (Republican)	Republican hold
42	R+63.1	Chris McDaniel	Republican	2007	No	▌ ✓ Robin Robinson (Republican)	Republican hold
43	R+53.8	Dennis DeBar	Republican	2015	Yes	▌ ✓ Dennis DeBar (Republican)	Republican hold
44	R+42.3	John A. Polk	Republican	2011	Yes	▌ ✓ John A. Polk (Republican)	Republican hold
45	R+31.4	Chris Johnson	Republican	2019	Yes	▌ ✓ Chris Johnson (Republican)	Republican hold
46	R+60.7	Philip Moran	Republican	2011	Lost renomination	▌ ✓ Philman A. Ladner (Republican)	Republican hold
47	R+64.7	Mike Seymour	Republican	2015	Yes	▌ ✓ Mike Seymour (Republican) 86.09%; ▌ George "Tony" Uram (independent) 13.91%	Republican hold
48	R+11.0	Mike Thompson	Republican	2019	Yes	▌ ✓ Mike Thompson (Republican) 71.1%; ▌ Mathew Adams (Libertarian) 28.9%	Republican hold
49	R+16.7	Joel Carter	Republican	2017 (special)	Yes	▌ ✓ Joel Carter (Republican) 69.91%; ▌ Glen A. Lewis (Libertarian) 30.09%	Republican hold
50	R+26.2	Scott DeLano	Republican	2019	Yes	▌ ✓ Scott DeLano (Republican)	Republican hold
51	R+25.9	Jeremy England	Republican	2019	Yes	▌ ✓ Jeremy England (Republican) 75.9%; ▌ Lynn M. Bowker (Libertarian) 13.8%; ▌ Artis R. Burney (Green) 10.3%	Republican hold
52	R+28.8	Brice Wiggins	Republican	2011	Yes	▌ ✓ Brice Wiggins (Republican)	Republican hold

== See also ==
- 2023 United States state legislative elections
- 2023 Mississippi House of Representatives election
