= List of new members of the 116th United States Congress =

The 116th United States Congress began on January 3, 2019. There were nine new senators (two Democrats, seven Republicans) and a minimum of 89 new representatives (59 Democrats, 29 Republicans, with one open seat pending), as well as one new delegate (a Democrat), at the start of its first session. Additionally, three senators (one Democrat, two Republicans) and eight representatives (two Democrats, six Republicans) took office on various dates in order to fill vacancies during the 117th Congress before it ended on January 3, 2021.

The co-presidents of the House Democratic freshman class were Colin Allred of Texas and Haley Stevens of Michigan, while the president of the House Republican freshman class was Mark Green of Tennessee. Additionally, the Democratic Freshmen Leadership Representatives were Katie Hill of California and Joe Neguse of Colorado, and the Republican's freshmen liaison was Guy Reschenthaler of Pennsylvania. Veronica Escobar of Texas replaced Hill upon her resignation in November 2019.

== Senate ==
=== Took office January 3, 2019 ===
State	Image	Senator	Seniority	Switched party	Prior background	Birth year	Ref
Arizona (Class 3)		Martha McSally (R)	4th (95th overall)	No; Appointed; replaced Jon Kyl (R)	U.S. House of Representatives (Note: Elected to the 114th Congress, serving from 2015 to 2019 in Arizona's 2nd district.); U.S. Air Force Colonel	1966	
Arizona (Class 1)		Kyrsten Sinema (D)	2nd (93rd overall)	Yes (Note: Sinema became an independent in December 2022, during the 117th Congress.); Open seat; replaced Jeff Flake (R)	U.S. House of Representatives (Note: Elected to the 113th Congress, serving from 2013 to 2019 in Arizona's 9th district.); Arizona Senate; Arizona House of Representatives	1976	
Indiana		Mike Braun (R)	7th (98th overall)	Yes; Defeated Joe Donnelly (D)	Indiana House of Representatives	1954	
Missouri		Josh Hawley (R)	8th (99th overall)	Yes; Defeated Claire McCaskill (D)	Missouri Attorney General	1979	
Nevada		Jacky Rosen (D)	5th (96th overall)	Yes; Defeated Dean Heller (R)	U.S. House of Representatives (Note: Elected to the 115th Congress, serving from 2017 to 2019 in Nevada's 3rd district.)	1957	
North Dakota		Kevin Cramer (R)	3rd (94th overall)	Yes; Defeated Heidi Heitkamp (D)	U.S. House of Representatives (Note: Elected to the 113th Congress, serving from 2013 to 2019 in North Dakota's at-large district.); North Dakota Public Service Commission; Chair of the North Dakota Republican Party	1961	
Tennessee		Marsha Blackburn (R)	1st (92nd overall)	No; Open seat; replaced Bob Corker (R)	U.S. House of Representatives (Note: Elected to the 108th Congress, serving from 2003 to 2019 in Tennessee's 7th district.); Tennessee Senate; Chair of the Williamson County Republican Party	1952	
Utah		Mitt Romney (R)	6th (97th overall)	No; Open seat; replaced Orrin Hatch (R)	Governor of Massachusetts; Co-founder of Bain Capital; CEO of Bain & Company	1947	

=== Took office during the 116th Congress ===
State	Image	Senator	Took office	Switched party	Prior background	Birth year	Ref
Florida		Rick Scott (R)	January 8, 2019 (Note: Scott was duly elected in November 2018, but chose to delay the start of his service in the Senate by a few days until the end of his term as Governor of Florida.)	Yes; Defeated Bill Nelson (D)	Governor of Florida; Co-founder of Columbia Hospital Corporation; U.S. Navy Petty Officer	1952	
Georgia		Kelly Loeffler (R)	January 6, 2020	No; Appointed; replaced Johnny Isakson (R)	CEO of Bakkt	1970	
Arizona (Class 3)		Mark Kelly (D)	December 2, 2020	Yes; Defeated Martha McSally (R)	NASA astronaut U.S. Navy Captain	1964	

== House of Representatives ==
=== Took office January 3, 2019 ===
District	Image	Representative	Switched party	Prior background	Birth year	Ref
Arizona 2		Ann Kirkpatrick (D)	Yes; Open seat; replaced Martha McSally (R)	U.S. House of Representatives (Note: Previously elected to the 111th Congress, serving from 2009 to 2011; elected again to the 113th Congress, serving from 2013 to 2017.); Arizona House of Representatives	1950	
Arizona 9		Greg Stanton (D)	No; Open seat; replaced Kyrsten Sinema (D)	Mayor of Phoenix; Phoenix City Council	1970	
California 10		Josh Harder (D)	Yes; Defeated Jeff Denham (R)	Venture capital investor	1986	
California 21		TJ Cox (D)	Yes; Defeated David Valadao (R)	Chemical engineer	1963	
California 25		Katie Hill (D)	Yes; Defeated Steve Knight (R)	Social services administrator	1987	
California 39		Gil Cisneros (D)	Yes; Open seat; replaced Ed Royce (R)	Philanthropist; U.S. Navy Lieutenant Commander	1971	
California 45		Katie Porter (D)	Yes; Open seat; replaced Mimi Walters (R)	Lawyer; Professor	1974	
California 48		Harley Rouda (D)	Yes; Defeated Dana Rohrabacher (R)	Lawyer; Businessman	1961	
California 49		Mike Levin (D)	Yes; Open seat; replaced Darrell Issa (R)	Attorney	1978	
Colorado 2		Joe Neguse (D)	No; Open seat; replaced Jared Polis (D)	Colorado Director of Regulatory Agencies; Regents of the University of Colorado	1984	
Colorado 6		Jason Crow (D)	Yes; Defeated Mike Coffman (R)	Lawyer; U.S. Army Ranger	1979	
Connecticut 5		Jahana Hayes (D)	No; Open seat; replaced Elizabeth Esty (D)	Educator	1973	
Florida 6		Mike Waltz (R)	No; Open seat; replaced Ron DeSantis (R)	U.S. Army Special Forces	1974	
Florida 15		Ross Spano (R)	No; Open seat; replaced Dennis Ross (R)	Florida House of Representatives	1966	
Florida 17		Greg Steube (R)	No; Open seat; replaced Tom Rooney (R)	Florida Senate; Florida House of Representatives; U.S. Army Judge Advocate General's Corps	1978	
Florida 26		Debbie Mucarsel-Powell (D)	Yes; Defeated Carlos Curbelo (R)	Academic administrator	1971	
Florida 27		Donna Shalala (D)	Yes; Open seat; replaced Ileana Ros-Lehtinen (R)	U.S. Secretary of Health and Human Services; Asst. Sec. of Housing and Urban Development; President of the Clinton Foundation; President of the University of Miami	1941	
Georgia 6		Lucy McBath (D)	Yes; Defeated Karen Handel (R)	Gun control advocate	1960	
Hawaii 1		Ed Case (D)	No; Open seat; replaced Colleen Hanabusa (D)	U.S. House of Representatives (Note: Previously elected to the 107th Congress, serving from 2002 to 2007.); Hawaii House of Representatives	1952	
Idaho 1		Russ Fulcher (R)	No; Open seat; replaced Raúl Labrador (R)	Idaho Senate	1962	
Illinois 4		Chuy García (D)	No; Open seat; replaced Luis Gutiérrez (D)	Cook County Board of Commissioners; Illinois Senate; Chicago City Council	1956	
Illinois 6		Sean Casten (D)	Yes; Defeated Peter Roskam (R)	Co-founder of Recycled Energy Development; Scientist	1971	
Illinois 14		Lauren Underwood (D)	Yes; Defeated Randy Hultgren (R)	Senior advisor at the U.S. HHS Department; Registered nurse	1986	
Indiana 4		Jim Baird (R)	No; Open seat; replaced Todd Rokita (R)	Indiana House of Representatives; U.S. Army First Lieutenant	1945	
Indiana 6		Greg Pence (R)	No; Open seat; replaced Luke Messer (R)	Businessman; U.S. Marine Corps First Lieutenant	1956	
Iowa 1		Abby Finkenauer (D)	Yes; Defeated Rod Blum (R)	Iowa House of Representatives	1988	
Iowa 3		Cindy Axne (D)	Yes; Defeated David Young (R)	Businesswoman	1965	
Kansas 2		Steve Watkins (R)	No; Open seat; replaced Lynn Jenkins (R)	U.S. Army Captain	1976	
Kansas 3		Sharice Davids (D)	Yes; Defeated Kevin Yoder (R)	Attorney; Mixed martial artist	1980	
Maine 2		Jared Golden (D)	Yes; Defeated Bruce Poliquin (R)	Maine House of Representatives; U.S. Marine Corps	1982	
Maryland 6		David Trone (D)	No; Open seat; replaced John Delaney (D)	Co-founder of Total Wine & More	1955	
Massachusetts 3		Lori Trahan (D)	No; Open seat; replaced Niki Tsongas (D)	Businesswoman; Chief of staff to Representative Marty Meehan	1973	
Massachusetts 7		Ayanna Pressley (D)	No; Defeated Mike Capuano (D) in a primary	Boston City Council; Senior aide to Senator John Kerry	1974	
Michigan 8		Elissa Slotkin (D)	Yes; Defeated Mike Bishop (R)	Assistant Secretary of Defense (ISA); Central Intelligence Agency	1976	
Michigan 9		Andy Levin (D)	No; Open seat; replaced Sander Levin (D)	Deputy Director of the Michigan DELEG; Trade union organizer	1960	
Michigan 11		Haley Stevens (D)	Yes; Open seat; replaced Dave Trott (R)	Chief of staff to the Pres. Auto Industry Task Force	1983	
Michigan 13		Rashida Tlaib (D)	No; Open seat; replaced Brenda Jones (D) (Note: Elected in the special election to replace John Conyers.)	Michigan House of Representatives	1976	
Minnesota 1		Jim Hagedorn (R)	Yes; Open seat; replaced Tim Walz (DFL)	Bureau of Engraving and Printing official Financial Management Service official Legislative aide to Representative Arlan Stangeland	1962	
Minnesota 2		Angie Craig (DFL)	Yes; Defeated Jason Lewis (R)	Journalist	1972	
Minnesota 3		Dean Phillips (DFL)	Yes; Defeated Erik Paulsen (R)	President of Phillips Distilling Company; Co-owner of Talenti	1969	
Minnesota 5		Ilhan Omar (DFL)	No; Open seat; replaced Keith Ellison (DFL)	Minnesota House of Representatives; Policy aide to City Councilor Andrew Johnson	1982	
Minnesota 8		Pete Stauber (R)	Yes; Open seat; replaced Rick Nolan (DFL)	St. Louis County Commission; Hermantown City Council; Duluth Police Department; Professional ice hockey player	1966	
Mississippi 3		Michael Guest (R)	No; Open seat; replaced Gregg Harper (R)	Madison and Rankin Counties District Attorney	1970	
Nevada 3		Susie Lee (D)	No; Open seat; replaced Jacky Rosen (D)	President of Nevada Communities In Schools	1966	
Nevada 4		Steven Horsford (D)	No; Open seat; replaced Ruben Kihuen (D)	U.S. House of Representatives (Note: Previously elected to the 113th Congress, serving from 2013 to 2015.); Majority Leader of the Nevada Senate	1973	
New Hampshire 1		Chris Pappas (D)	No; Open seat; replaced Carol Shea-Porter (D)	Executive Council of New Hampshire; New Hampshire House of Representatives	1980	
New Jersey 2		Jeff Van Drew (D)	Yes (Note: Van Drew switched to the Republican Party in January 2020.); Open seat; replaced Frank LoBiondo (R)	New Jersey Senate; New Jersey General Assembly; Cape May County Board of Chosen Freeholders	1953	
New Jersey 3		Andy Kim (D)	Yes; Defeated Tom MacArthur (R)	U.S. National Security Council	1982	
New Jersey 7		Tom Malinowski (D)	Yes; Defeated Leonard Lance (R)	Assistant Secretary of State (D/HR/L); Human Rights Watch; U.S. National Security Council	1965	
New Jersey 11		Mikie Sherrill (D)	Yes; Open seat; replaced Rodney Frelinghuysen (R)	Assistant U.S. Attorney; U.S. Navy Lieutenant	1972	
New Mexico 1		Deb Haaland (D)	No; Open seat; replaced Michelle Lujan Grisham (D)	Chair of the Democratic Party of New Mexico	1960	
New Mexico 2		Xochitl Torres Small (D)	Yes; Open seat; replaced Steve Pearce (R)	Law clerk	1984	
New York 11		Max Rose (D)	Yes; Defeated Dan Donovan (R)	Army National Guard Captain	1986	
New York 14		Alexandria Ocasio-Cortez (D)	No; Defeated Joe Crowley (D) in a primary (Note: Crowley ran in the general election as nominee of Working Families and was subsequently defeated by Ocasio-Cortez.)	Activist	1989	
New York 19		Antonio Delgado (D)	Yes; Defeated John Faso (R)	Attorney	1977	
New York 22		Anthony Brindisi (D)	Yes; Defeated Claudia Tenney (R)	New York State Assembly	1978	
North Dakota at-large		Kelly Armstrong (R)	No; Open seat; replaced Kevin Cramer (R)	Chair of the North Dakota Republican Party; North Dakota Senate	1976	
Ohio 16		Anthony Gonzalez (R)	No; Open seat; replaced Jim Renacci (R)	Professional football player	1984	
Oklahoma 5		Kendra Horn (D)	Yes; Defeated Steve Russell (R)	Lawyer	1976	
Pennsylvania 4		Madeleine Dean (D)	New seat	Pennsylvania House of Representatives	1959	
Pennsylvania 6		Chrissy Houlahan (D)	Yes; Open seat; replaced Ryan Costello (R)	COO of AND1; U.S. Air Force Reserve Captain	1967	
Pennsylvania 9		Dan Meuser (R)	No; Open seat; replaced Lou Barletta (R)	Pennsylvania Secretary of Revenue	1964	
Pennsylvania 13		John Joyce (R)	No; Open seat; replaced Bill Shuster (R)	Dermatologist	1957	
Pennsylvania 14		Guy Reschenthaler (R)	New seat	Pennsylvania State Senate; U.S. Navy Judge Advocate General's Corps	1983	
South Carolina 1		Joe Cunningham (D)	Yes; Replaced Mark Sanford (R), who was defeated in a primary	Marine engineer Construction attorney	1982	
South Carolina 4		William Timmons (R)	No; Open seat; replaced Trey Gowdy (R)	South Carolina Senate; Air National Guard Captain	1984	
South Dakota at-large		Dusty Johnson (R)	No; Open seat; replaced Kristi Noem (R)	Chief of staff to Governor Dennis Daugaard; South Dakota Public Utilities Commission	1976	
Tennessee 2		Tim Burchett (R)	No; Open seat; replaced Jimmy Duncan (R)	Mayor of Knox County; Tennessee Senate; Tennessee House of Representatives	1964	
Tennessee 6		John Rose (R)	No; Open seat; replaced Diane Black (R)	Tennessee Commissioner of Agriculture	1965	
Tennessee 7		Mark Green (R)	No; Open seat; replaced Marsha Blackburn (R)	Tennessee Senate; U.S. Army Major	1964	
Texas 2		Dan Crenshaw (R)	No; Open seat; replaced Ted Poe (R)	U.S. Navy SEAL	1984	
Texas 3		Van Taylor (R)	No; Open seat; replaced Sam Johnson (R)	Texas Senate; Texas House of Representatives; U.S. Marine Corps Major	1972	
Texas 5		Lance Gooden (R)	No; Open seat; replaced Jeb Hensarling (R)	Texas House of Representatives	1982	
Texas 6		Ron Wright (R)	No; Open seat; replaced Joe Barton (R)	Tarrant County Tax Assessor-Collector; Chief of staff to Representative Joe Barton; Arlington City Council	1953	
Texas 7		Lizzie Fletcher (D)	Yes; Defeated John Culberson (R)	Attorney	1975	
Texas 16		Veronica Escobar (D)	No; Open seat; replaced Beto O'Rourke (D)	El Paso County Judge; El Paso County Commission	1969	
Texas 21		Chip Roy (R)	No; Open seat; replaced Lamar Smith (R)	Chief of staff to Senator Ted Cruz	1972	
Texas 29		Sylvia Garcia (D)	No; Open seat; replaced Gene Green (D)	Texas Senate; Harris County Commission; Houston City Controller	1950	
Texas 32		Colin Allred (D)	Yes; Defeated Pete Sessions (R)	Professional football player Lawyer	1983	
Utah 4		Ben McAdams (D)	Yes; Defeated Mia Love (R)	Mayor of Salt Lake County; Utah State Senate	1974	
Virginia 2		Elaine Luria (D)	Yes; Defeated Scott Taylor (R)	U.S. Navy Commander	1975	
Virginia 5		Denver Riggleman (R)	No; Open seat; replaced Tom Garrett (R)	National Security Agency contractor U.S. Air Force ISR Agency	1970	
Virginia 6		Ben Cline (R)	No; Open seat; replaced Bob Goodlatte (R)	Virginia House of Delegates	1972	
Virginia 7		Abigail Spanberger (D)	Yes; Defeated Dave Brat (R)	Central Intelligence Agency	1979	
Virginia 10		Jennifer Wexton (D)	Yes; Defeated Barbara Comstock (R)	Senate of Virginia	1968	
Washington 8		Kim Schrier (D)	Yes; Open seat; replaced Dave Reichert (R)	Pediatrician	1968	
West Virginia 3		Carol Miller (R)	No; Open seat; replaced Evan Jenkins (R)	West Virginia House of Delegates	1950	
Wisconsin 1		Bryan Steil (R)	No; Open seat; replaced Paul Ryan (R)	University of Wisconsin Board of Regents	1981	

==== Non-voting members ====
District	Image	Delegate	Switched party	Prior background	Birth year	Ref
Guam at-large		Michael San Nicolas (D)	No; Defeated Madeleine Bordallo (D) in a primary	Legislature of Guam	1981	

=== Took office during the 116th Congress ===
District	Image	Representative	Took office	Switched party	Prior background	Birth year	Ref
Pennsylvania 12		Fred Keller (R)	May 21, 2019	No; Succeeded Tom Marino (R)	Pennsylvania House of Representatives	1965	
North Carolina 3		Greg Murphy (R)	September 17, 2019	No; Succeeded Walter B. Jones Jr. (R)	North Carolina House of Representatives; Urologist	1963	
North Carolina 9		Dan Bishop (R)	September 17, 2019	No; Succeeded Robert Pittenger (R) (Note: Pittenger directly preceded Bishop after the disputed election.)	North Carolina Senate; North Carolina House of Representatives; Mecklenburg County Commission	1964	
Maryland 7		Kweisi Mfume (D)	May 5, 2020	No; Succeeded Elijah Cummings (D)	President of the NAACP; U.S. House of Representatives (Note: Previously elected to the 100th Congress, serving from 1987 to 1996.); Baltimore City Council	1948	
California 25		Mike Garcia (R)	May 19, 2020	Yes; Succeeded Katie Hill (D)	Business development manager U.S. Navy Lieutenant Commander	1976	
Wisconsin 7		Tom Tiffany (R)	May 19, 2020	No; Succeeded Sean Duffy (R)	Wisconsin Senate; Wisconsin State Assembly	1957	
New York 27		Chris Jacobs (R)	July 21, 2020	No; Succeeded Chris Collins (R)	New York State Senate; Erie County Clerk; Secretary of State of New York	1966	
Georgia 5		Kwanza Hall (D)	December 3, 2020	No; Succeeded John Lewis (D)	Atlanta City Council	1971	

== See also ==
- List of United States representatives in the 116th Congress
- List of United States senators in the 116th Congress

== Notes ==
Preceded by New members of the 115th Congress	New members of the 116th Congress; 2019–2021	Succeeded by New members of the 117th Congress
