= Jason Barrett =

Jason Barrett may refer to:

- Jason Barrett (actor) (born 1976), Jamaican-British actor and mixed martial artist
- Jason Barrett (West Virginia politician) (born 1982), member of the West Virginia State Senate
- Jason Barrett (Mississippi politician) (born 1978), member of the Mississippi State Senate
