= Sampson Jackson =

American politician (born 1953)

Sampson Jackson II

Member of the Mississippi State Senate from the 32nd district
- In office January 7, 1992 – June 30, 2021
- Preceded by: Eddie Briggs
- Succeeded by: Rod Hickman

Personal details
- Born: January 30, 1953 (age 73) Preston, Mississippi, U.S.
- Party: Democratic
- Spouse: Patricia Diane Hayes
- Occupation: Businessman, farmer

Sampson Jackson II (born January 30, 1953) was a Democratic member of the Mississippi Senate who represented the 32nd District from 1992 until his resignation in 2021. He was succeeded by Rod Hickman following a 2021 special election.
