= Tammy Witherspoon =

American politician (born 1968)

Mayor of Magnolia
- Incumbent
- Assumed office June 31, 2021
- Preceded by: Anthony Witherspoon

Member of the Mississippi State Senate from the 38th district
- In office January 5, 2016 – June 30, 2021
- Preceded by: Kelvin Butler
- Succeeded by: Kelvin Butler

Personal details
- Born: December 10, 1968 (age 57) McComb, Mississippi
- Party: Democratic

Tammy Witherspoon (born December 10, 1968) is an American politician, currently serving as mayor of Magnolia, Mississippi. She previously served in the Mississippi State Senate from the 38th district from 2016 to 2021.
