= Philman Ladner =

Mississippi politician

Member of the Mississippi State Senate from the 46th district
- Incumbent
- Assumed office January 2, 2024
- Preceded by: Philip Moran

Personal details
- Party: Republican
- Occupation: Businessman

Philman Ladner is a Mississippi state senator, representing the 46th district in the Mississippi State Senate since 2024. His county covers Harrison and Hancock county.

== Biography ==
Ladner attended St. Stanislaus College in Bay St. Louis. He is the manager of a family-owned business. He trains race horses and buys and sells cattle.

A Republican, Ladner ran for election in 2023 for the Mississippi State Senate to represent the 46th district. He ran against incumbent Phillip Moran in the Republican primary. In a political upset, he won 54% to 46% and ran uncontested in the general election; Moran was the only senator incumbent to lose in the 2023 elections. In the months leading up to the election, Moran was embroiled in controversy for concealing assets to avoid liability in a lawsuit related to a sexual assault case against his son.

In the senate, he is a member of the following committees: Wildlife, Fisheries and Parks, Agriculture, Finance, Gaming, Municipalities, Ports and Marine Resources, Public Property, and Tourism.

He is a member of the Harrison County Republican Club and Hancock County Republican Women's Club.

He is married and has four children. He is of Catholic faith. He resides in Pass Christian, Mississippi.
