= Andy Berry =

Mississippi politician

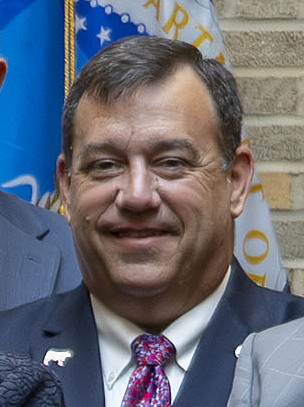
- Berry in 2026

Member of the Mississippi State Senate from the 11th district
- Incumbent
- Assumed office January 2, 2024
- Preceded by: Chris Caughman

Personal details
- Born: Jackson, Mississippi, U.S.
- Party: Republican
- Occupation: Cattle farmer

Andy Berry is a Mississippi state senator, representing the 35th district in the Mississippi State Senate since 2024. His district covers parts or all of Copiah, Jefferson Davis, Lawrence, and Simpson.

== Biography ==
Berry was born in Jackson, Mississippi. He attended Simpson County Academy, Copiah Lincoln Community College, and Mississippi State University. He has worked for the Mississippi Cattlemen's Association and the affiliated Mississippi Beef Council.

A Republican, Berry ran for election to the Mississippi State Senate upon the retirement of Chris Caughman. He was uncontested in the primary and general election. In the state senate, he is on the following committees: Agriculture. County Affairs, Economic and Workforce Development, Environment Prot, Cons and Water Res, Finance, Forestry, Highways and Transportation, Investigate State Offices, and Judiciary, Division B.

He is married to Jennifer Berry and is of Baptist faith.
