= 2018 United States House of Representatives elections in Mississippi =

- November 6, 2018

All 4 Mississippi seats to the United States House of Representatives
	Majority party	Minority party	Third party
Party	Republican	Democratic	Independent
Last election	3	1	0
Seats won	3	1	0
Seat change	Steady	Steady	Steady
Popular vote	471,162	398,770	48,104
Percentage	50.18%	42.47%	5.12%
Swing	▼7.40%	▲4.42%	▲3.80%

Republican
40–50%
50–60%
60–70%
70–80%
80–90%
Democratic
40–50%
50–60%
60–70%
70–80%
80–90%
Independent
40–50%

The 2018 United States House of Representatives elections in Mississippi were held on Tuesday, November 6, to elect the four U.S. representatives from the U.S. state of Mississippi; one from each of the state's four congressional districts. Primaries were held on June 5, 2018. The elections and primaries coincided with the elections and primaries of other federal and state offices.

== Overview ==
2018 United States House of Representatives elections in Mississippi
Party	Votes	Percentage	Seats	+/–
Republican	471,162	50.18%	3	-
Democratic	398,770	42.47%	1	-
Independents	48,104	5.12%	0	-
Reform	20,867	2.22%	0	-
Totals	938,903	100.00%	4	—

=== District ===
Results of the 2018 United States House of Representatives elections in Mississippi by district:

District	Republican		Democratic		Others		Total		Result
District	Votes	%	Votes	%	Votes	%	Votes	%	Result
District 1	158,245	66.90%	76,601	32.39%	1,675	0.71%	236,521	100%	Republican hold
District 2	0	0.00%	158,921	71.79%	62,458	28.21%	221,379	100%	Democratic hold
District 3	160,284	62.30%	94,461	36.72%	2,526	0.98%	257,271	100%	Republican hold
District 4	152,633	68.22%	68,787	30.75%	2,312	1.03%	223,732	100%	Republican hold
Total	471,162	50.18%	398,770	42.47%	68,971	7.35%	938,903	100%	

Popular vote
Republican	50.18%
Democratic	42.47%
Other	7.34%

House seats
Republican	75%
Democratic	25%

== District 1 ==
2018 Mississippi's 1st congressional district election

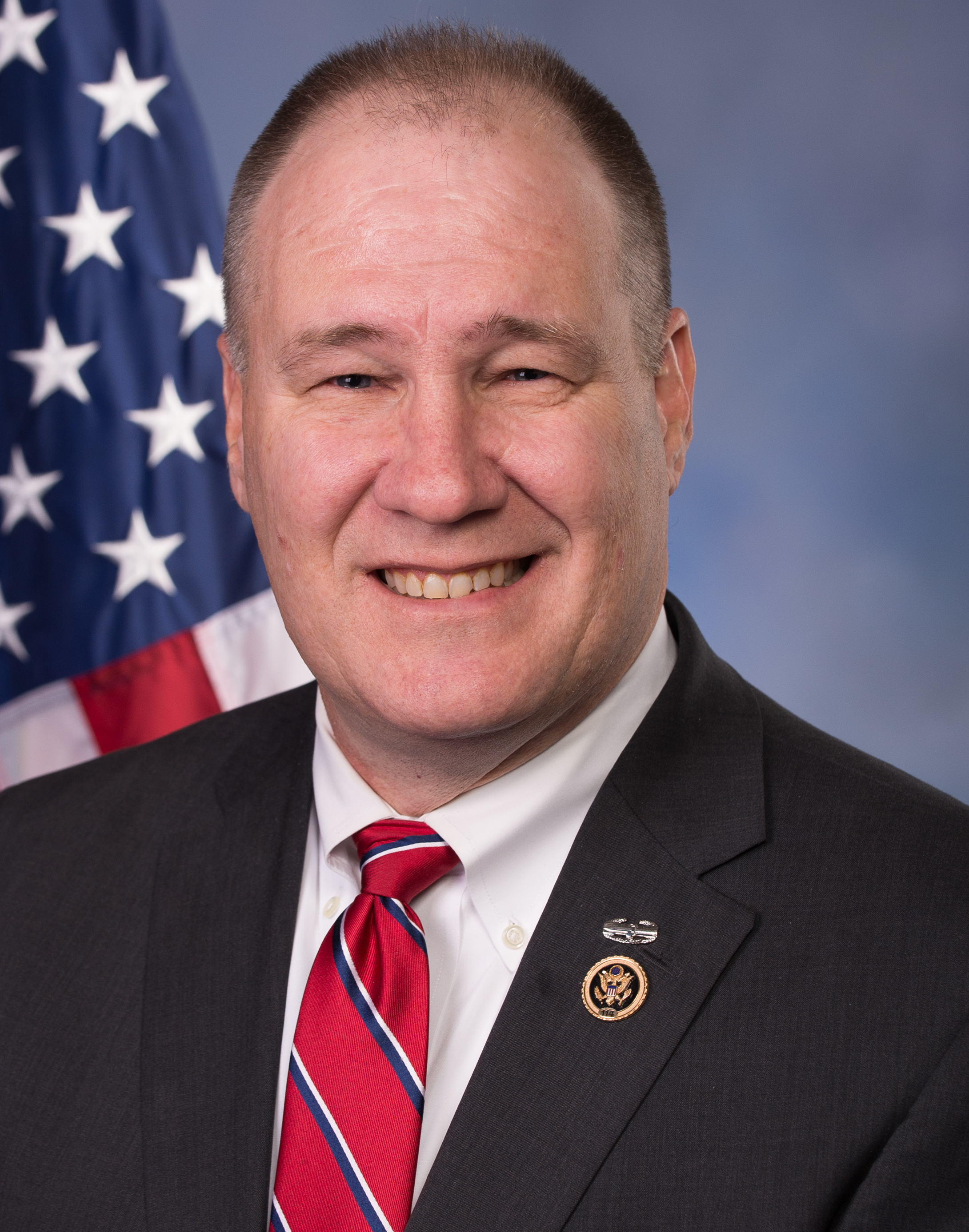

Nominee	Trent Kelly	Randy Wadkins
Party	Republican	Democratic
Popular vote	158,245	76,601
Percentage	66.9%	32.4%
- County results Kelly: 50–60% 60–70% 70–80% 80–90% Wadkins: 50–60%
U.S. Representative before election
Trent Kelly
Republican
Elected U.S. Representative
Trent Kelly
Republican

The incumbent was Republican Trent Kelly, who had represented the district since 2015. Kelly was re-elected with 69% of the vote in 2016.

=== Democratic primary ===
- Randy Wadkins, professor

==== Primary results ====
Democratic primary results
Party	Candidate	Votes	%
Democratic	Randy Wadkins	11,692	100.0
Total votes		11,692	100.0

=== Republican primary ===
- Trent Kelly, incumbent

==== Primary results ====
Republican primary results
Party	Candidate	Votes	%
Republican	Trent Kelly (incumbent)	30,151	100.0
Total votes		30,151	100.0

=== General election ===
==== Predictions ====
Source	Ranking	As of
The Cook Political Report	Safe R	November 5, 2018
Inside Elections	Safe R	November 5, 2018
Sabato's Crystal Ball	Safe R	November 5, 2018
RCP	Safe R	November 5, 2018
Daily Kos	Safe R	November 5, 2018
538	Safe R	November 7, 2018
CNN	Safe R	October 31, 2018
Politico	Safe R	November 4, 2018

==== Polling ====
Poll source	Date(s) administered	Sample size	Margin of error	Trent Kelly (R)	Randy Wadkins (D)	Undecided
Triumph Campaigns	July 30–31, 2018	525	± 3.5%	57%	28%	15%

==== Results ====
2018 Mississippi's 1st congressional district election
Party	Candidate	Votes	%
Republican	Trent Kelly (incumbent)	158,245	66.9
Democratic	Randy Wadkins	76,601	32.4
Reform	Tracella Lou O'Hara Hill	1,675	0.7
Total votes		236,521	100.0
Republican hold			

==== By county ====
County	Trent Kelly Republican		Randy Wadkins Democratic		Tracella Lou O'Hara Hill Reform		Margin		Total
County	#	%	#	%	#	%	#	%	Total
Alcorn	8,233	80.71%	1,908	18.70%	60	0.59%	6,325	62.00%	10,201
Benton	1,618	57.85%	1,160	41.47%	19	0.68%	458	16.37%	2,797
Calhoun	3,332	71.36%	1,303	27.91%	34	0.73%	2,029	43.46%	4,669
Chickasaw	3,372	56.45%	2,545	42.61%	56	0.94%	827	13.85%	5,973
Choctaw	2,171	71.86%	827	27.38%	23	0.76%	1,344	44.49%	3,021
Clay	3,508	45.50%	4,149	53.81%	53	0.69%	-641	-8.31%	7,710
DeSoto	33,118	65.22%	17,258	33.99%	401	0.79%	15,860	31.23%	50,777
Itawamba	6,094	88.43%	756	10.97%	41	0.59%	5,338	77.46%	6,891
Lafayette	9,357	56.81%	7,018	42.61%	97	0.59%	2,339	14.20%	16,472
Lee	18,188	71.04%	7,254	28.33%	161	0.63%	10,934	42.71%	25,603
Lowndes	10,832	54.59%	8,852	44.61%	158	0.80%	1,980	9.98%	19,842
Marshall	5,388	47.40%	5,880	51.72%	100	0.88%	-492	-4.33%	11,368
Monroe	7,894	66.66%	3,865	32.64%	83	0.70%	4,029	34.02%	11,842
Oktibbeha (part)	792	60.50%	509	38.88%	8	0.61%	283	21.62%	1,309
Pontotoc	8,019	82.64%	1,629	16.79%	55	0.57%	6,390	65.86%	9,703
Prentiss	5,765	79.56%	1,433	19.78%	48	0.66%	4,332	59.78%	7,246
Tate	5,781	66.57%	2,847	32.78%	56	0.64%	2,934	33.79%	8,684
Tippah	5,579	80.18%	1,322	19.00%	57	0.82%	4,257	61.18%	6,958
Tishomingo	4,982	81.13%	1,117	18.19%	42	0.68%	3,865	62.94%	6,141
Union	6,974	83.63%	1,304	15.64%	61	0.73%	5,670	67.99%	8,339
Webster	3,197	81.14%	724	18.38%	19	0.48%	2,473	62.77%	3,940
Winston	4,051	57.58%	2,941	41.81%	43	0.61%	1,110	15.78%	7,035
Totals	158,245	66.91%	76,601	32.39%	1,675	0.71%	81,644	34.52%	236,521

== District 2 ==
2018 Mississippi's 2nd congressional district election

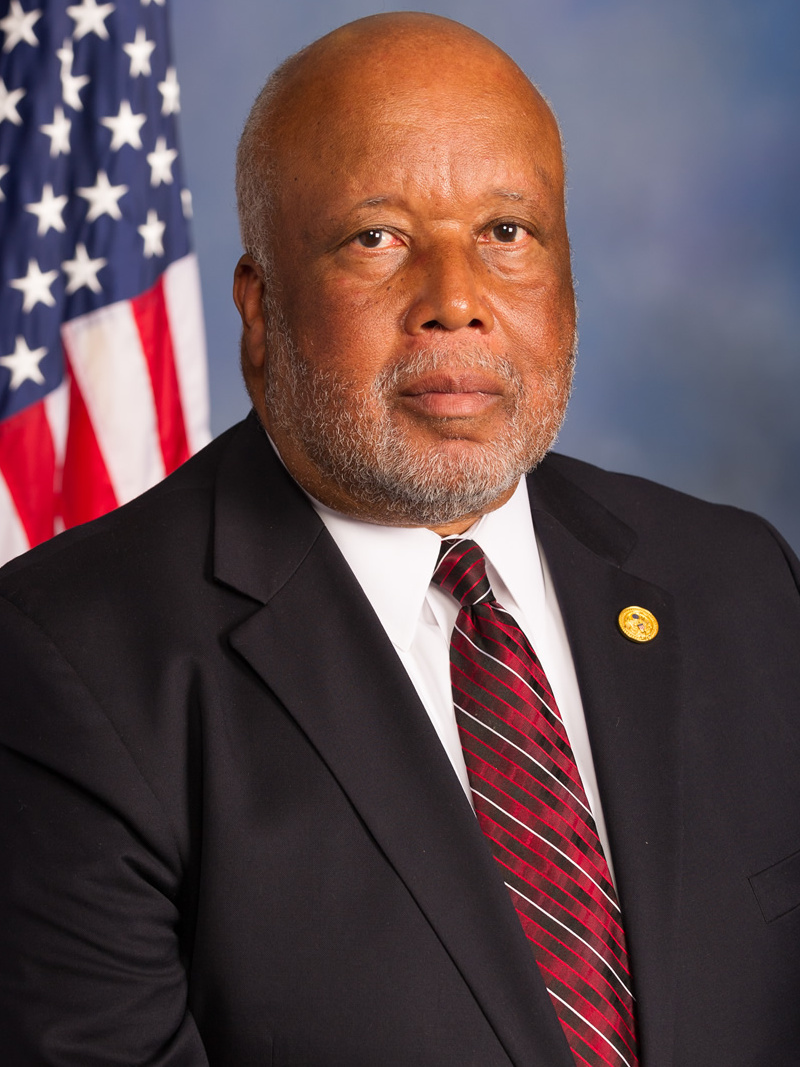

Nominee	Bennie Thompson	Troy Ray	Irving Harris
Party	Democratic	Independent	Reform
Popular vote	158,921	48,104	14,354
Percentage	71.8%	21.7%	6.5%
- County results Thompson: 40–50% 50–60% 60–70% 70–80% 80–90% Ray: 40–50%
U.S. Representative before election
Bennie Thompson
Democratic
Elected U.S. Representative
Bennie Thompson
Democratic

The incumbent was Democrat Bennie Thompson, who had represented the district since 1993. He was re-elected with 67% of the vote in 2016.

=== Democratic primary ===
- Bennie Thompson, incumbent

==== Primary results ====
Democratic primary results
Party	Candidate	Votes	%
Democratic	Bennie Thompson (incumbent)	31,203	100.0
Total votes		31,203	100.0

=== General election ===
==== Predictions ====
Source	Ranking	As of
The Cook Political Report	Safe D	November 5, 2018
Inside Elections	Safe D	November 5, 2018
Sabato's Crystal Ball	Safe D	November 5, 2018
RCP	Safe D	November 5, 2018
Daily Kos	Safe D	November 5, 2018
538	Safe D	November 7, 2018
CNN	Safe D	October 31, 2018
Politico	Safe D	November 4, 2018

==== Polling ====
Poll source	Date(s) administered	Sample size	Margin of error	Bennie Thompson (D)	Irving Harris (REF)	Undecided
Triumph Campaigns	July 30–31, 2018	525	± 3.5%	51%	22%	27%

==== Results ====
2018 Mississippi's 2nd congressional district election
Party	Candidate	Votes	%
Democratic	Bennie Thompson (incumbent)	158,921	71.8
Independent	Troy Ray	48,104	21.7
Reform	Irving Harris	14,354	6.5
Total votes		221,379	100.0
Democratic hold			

==== By county ====
County	Bennie Thompson Democratic		Troy Ray Independent		Irving Harris Reform		Margin		Total
County	#	%	#	%	#	%	#	%	Total
Attala	2,919	49.48%	2,406	40.79%	574	9.73%	513	8.70%	5,899
Bolivar	7,898	75.42%	2,117	20.22%	457	4.36%	5,781	55.20%	10,472
Carroll	1,738	43.45%	1,842	46.05%	420	10.50%	-104	-2.60%	4,000
Claiborne	2,895	86.06%	275	8.17%	194	5.77%	2,620	77.88%	3,364
Coahoma	4,987	80.13%	939	15.09%	298	4.79%	4,048	65.04%	6,224
Copiah	6,164	60.98%	2,710	26.81%	1,235	12.22%	3,454	34.17%	10,109
Grenada	4,166	58.20%	2,412	33.70%	580	8.10%	1,754	24.50%	7,158
Hinds (part)	52,703	79.84%	10,110	15.32%	3,198	4.84%	42,593	64.52%	66,011
Holmes	4,829	86.51%	590	10.57%	163	2.92%	4,239	75.94%	5,582
Humphreys	2,552	81.02%	414	13.14%	184	5.84%	2,138	67.87%	3,150
Issaquena	344	65.77%	135	25.81%	44	8.41%	209	39.96%	523
Jefferson	2,717	84.85%	203	6.34%	282	8.81%	2,435	76.05%	3,202
Leake	3,313	54.36%	2,113	34.67%	668	10.96%	1,200	19.69%	6,094
Leflore	6,357	75.64%	1,599	19.03%	448	5.33%	4,758	56.62%	8,404
Madison (part)	7,491	81.59%	1,289	14.04%	401	4.37%	6,202	67.55%	9,181
Montgomery	1,962	54.20%	1,327	36.66%	331	9.14%	635	17.54%	3,620
Panola	6,514	61.08%	3,329	31.22%	821	7.70%	3,185	29.87%	10,664
Quitman	1,803	76.24%	393	16.62%	169	7.15%	1,410	59.62%	2,365
Sharkey	1,365	80.44%	246	14.50%	86	5.07%	1,119	65.94%	1,697
Sunflower	5,776	79.25%	1,180	16.19%	332	4.56%	4,596	63.06%	7,288
Tallahatchie	2,839	68.08%	1,044	25.04%	287	6.88%	1,795	43.05%	4,170
Tunica	1,980	80.68%	345	14.06%	129	5.26%	1,635	66.63%	2,454
Warren	8,288	55.77%	5,171	34.80%	1,401	9.43%	3,117	20.98%	14,860
Washington	10,461	77.19%	2,483	18.32%	609	4.49%	7,978	58.87%	13,553
Yalobusha	2,495	57.82%	1,520	35.23%	300	6.95%	975	22.60%	4,315
Yazoo	4,365	62.18%	1,912	27.24%	743	10.58%	2,453	34.94%	7,020
Totals	158,921	71.79%	48,104	21.73%	14,354	6.48%	110,817	50.06%	221,379

== District 3 ==
2018 Mississippi's 3rd congressional district election

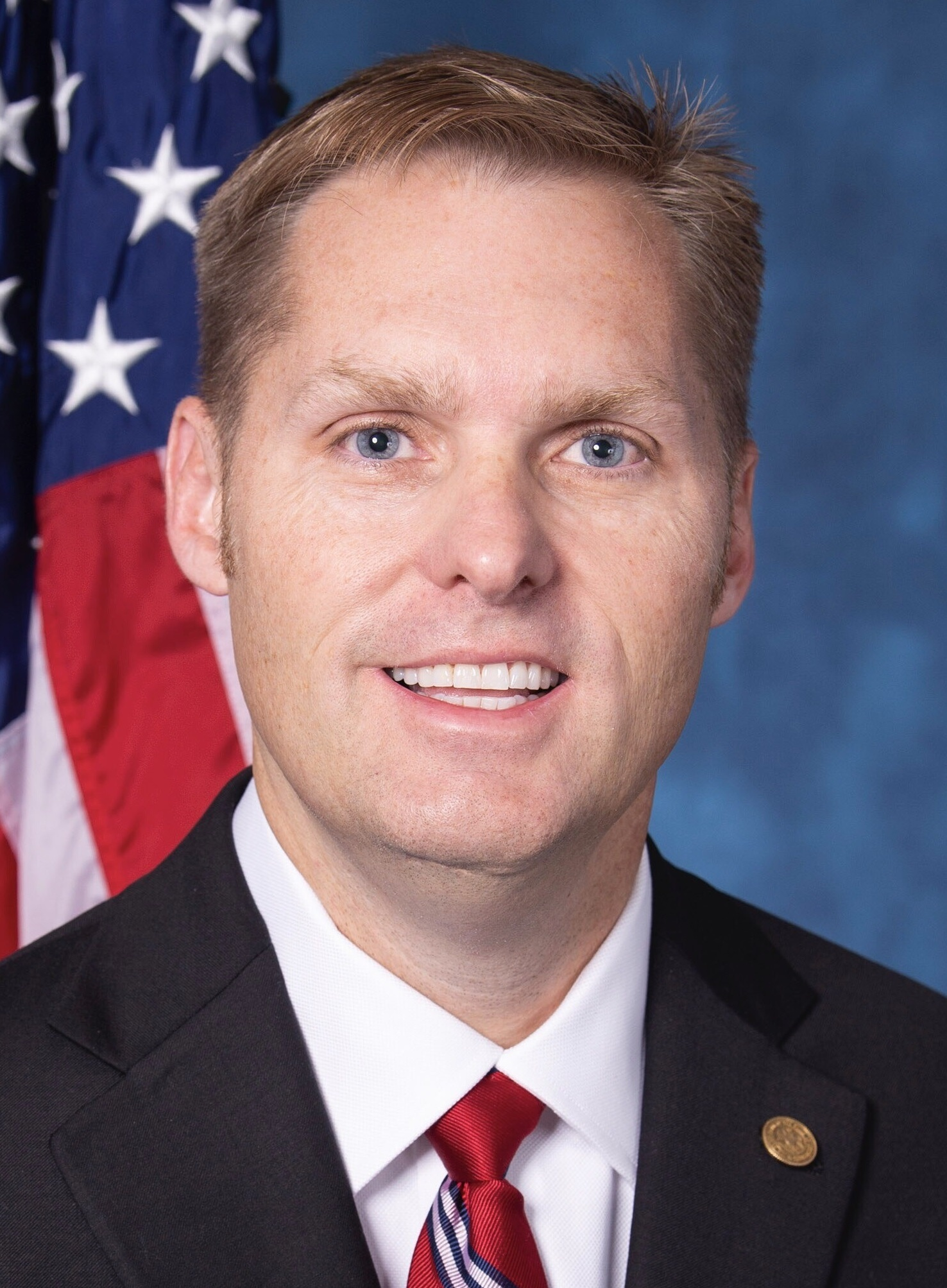

Nominee	Michael Guest	Michael Evans
Party	Republican	Democratic
Popular vote	160,284	94,461
Percentage	62.3%	36.7%
- County results Guest: 50–60% 60–70% 70–80% Evans: 50–60% 60–70% 70–80%
U.S. Representative before election
Gregg Harper
Republican
Elected U.S. Representative
Michael Guest
Republican

The incumbent was Republican Gregg Harper, who had represented the district since 2009. He was re-elected with 66% of the vote in 2016.

In January 2018, Harper announced that he would retire from Congress and not run for re-election in 2018.

=== Democratic primary ===
- Michael Aycox
- Michael Evans, state representative

==== Primary results ====
Democratic primary results
Party	Candidate	Votes	%
Democratic	Michael Evans	17,016	69.3
Democratic	Michael Aycox	7,525	30.7
Total votes		24,541	100.0

=== Republican primary ===
- Sally Doty, state senator
- Morgan Dunn, small business owner
- Michael Guest, district attorney of Madison County and Rankin County
- Whit Hughes, businessman
- Perry Parker, businessman
- Katherine Tate, education consultant

==== Debate ====
2018 Mississippi's 3rd congressional district Republican primary debate
No.	Date	Host	Moderator	Link	Republican	Republican	Republican	Republican	Republican	Republican
Key: P Participant A Absent N Not invited I Invited W Withdrawn										
Key: P Participant A Absent N Not invited I Invited W Withdrawn					Sally Doty	Morgan Dunn	Michael Guest	Whit Hughes	Perry Parker	Katherine Tate
1	Apr. 19, 2018	Americans for Prosperity Mississippi	Geoff Pender	YouTube	P	P	P	P	P	P

==== Primary results ====
Republican primary results
Party	Candidate	Votes	%
Republican	Michael Guest	29,157	44.8
Republican	Whit Hughes	14,464	22.2
Republican	Perry Parker	10,562	16.2
Republican	Sally Doty	6,608	10.2
Republican	Morgan Dunn	3,820	5.9
Republican	Katherine Tate	416	0.6
Total votes		65,027	100.0

==== Runoff results ====
Republican primary runoff results
Party	Candidate	Votes	%
Republican	Michael Guest	31,121	65.1
Republican	Whit Hughes	16,691	34.9
Total votes		47,812	100.0

=== General election ===
==== Predictions ====
Source	Ranking	As of
The Cook Political Report	Safe R	November 5, 2018
Inside Elections	Safe R	November 5, 2018
Sabato's Crystal Ball	Safe R	November 5, 2018
RCP	Safe R	November 5, 2018
Daily Kos	Safe R	November 5, 2018
538	Safe R	November 7, 2018
CNN	Safe R	October 31, 2018
Politico	Safe R	November 4, 2018

==== Polling ====
Poll source	Date(s) administered	Sample size	Margin of error	Michael Guest (R)	Michael Evans (D)	Undecided
Triumph Campaigns	July 30–31, 2018	525	± 3.5%	56%	27%	17%

==== Results ====
2018 Mississippi's 3rd congressional district election
Party	Candidate	Votes	%
Republican	Michael Guest	160,284	62.3
Democratic	Michael Evans	94,461	36.7
Reform	Matthew Holland	2,526	1.0
Total votes		257,271	100.0
Republican hold			

==== By county ====
County	Michael Guest Republican		Michael Evans Democratic		Matthew Holland Reform		Margin		Total
County	#	%	#	%	#	%	#	%	Total
Adams	4,535	41.99%	6,156	57.00%	109	1.01%	-1,621	-15.01%	10,800
Amite	3,318	61.71%	2,000	37.20%	59	1.10%	1,318	24.51%	5,377
Clarke (part)	3,625	68.41%	1,640	30.95%	34	0.64%	1,985	37.46%	5,299
Covington	4,098	59.58%	2,674	38.88%	106	1.54%	1,424	20.70%	6,878
Franklin	2,038	64.05%	1,097	34.48%	47	1.48%	941	29.57%	3,182
Hinds (part)	6,009	51.93%	5,440	47.01%	123	1.06%	569	4.92%	11,572
Jasper	2,931	45.59%	3,416	53.13%	82	1.28%	-485	-7.54%	6,429
Jefferson Davis	1,921	39.60%	2,872	59.20%	58	1.20%	-951	-19.60%	4,851
Kemper	979	27.70%	2,541	71.90%	14	0.40%	-1,562	-44.20%	3,534
Lauderdale	14,046	60.70%	8,952	38.69%	142	0.61%	5,094	22.01%	23,140
Lawrence	3,233	63.47%	1,810	35.53%	51	1.00%	1,423	27.93%	5,094
Lincoln	8,705	69.73%	3,664	29.35%	115	0.92%	5,041	40.38%	12,484
Madison (part)	22,221	71.30%	8,692	27.89%	254	0.81%	13,529	43.41%	31,167
Neshoba	5,085	63.29%	2,860	35.60%	89	1.11%	2,225	27.69%	8,034
Newton	4,994	68.73%	2,212	30.44%	60	0.83%	2,782	38.29%	7,266
Noxubee	889	22.51%	3,026	76.61%	35	0.89%	-2,137	-54.10%	3,950
Oktibbeha (part)	6,292	48.51%	6,544	50.45%	135	1.04%	-252	-1.94%	12,971
Pike	6,559	51.40%	6,051	47.42%	150	1.18%	508	3.98%	12,760
Rankin	39,779	77.00%	11,346	21.96%	536	1.04%	28,433	55.04%	51,661
Scott	4,683	59.28%	3,148	39.85%	69	0.87%	1,535	19.43%	7,900
Simpson	5,861	65.43%	3,009	33.59%	87	0.97%	2,852	31.84%	8,957
Smith	4,527	75.51%	1,383	23.07%	85	1.42%	3,144	52.44%	5,995
Walthall	2,994	58.45%	2,069	40.39%	59	1.15%	925	18.06%	5,122
Wilkinson	962	33.78%	1,859	65.27%	27	0.95%	-897	-31.50%	2,848
Totals	160,284	62.30%	94,461	36.72%	2,526	0.98%	65,823	25.59%	257,271

== District 4 ==
2018 Mississippi's 4th congressional district election

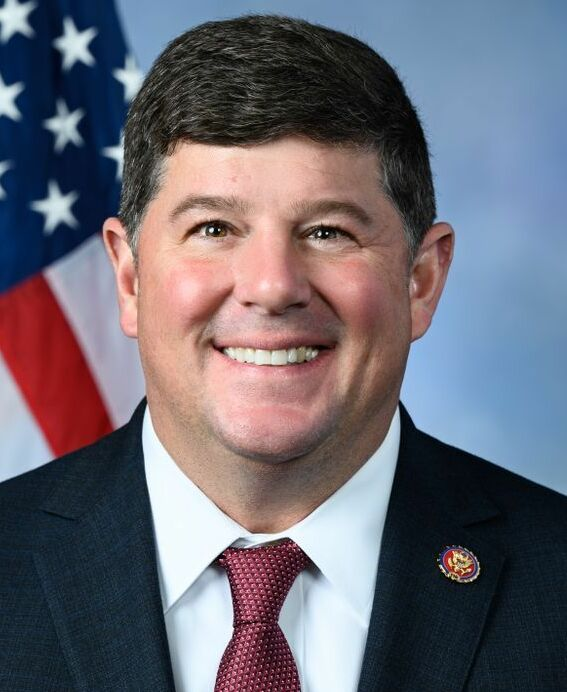

Nominee	Steven Palazzo	Jeramey Anderson
Party	Republican	Democratic
Popular vote	152,633	68,787
Percentage	68.2%	30.8%
- County results Palazzo: 50–60% 60–70% 70–80% 80–90% Anderson: 50–60%
U.S. Representative before election
Steven Palazzo
Republican
Elected U.S. Representative
Steven Palazzo
Republican

The incumbent is Republican Steven Palazzo, who has represented the district since 2011. He was re-elected with 65% of the vote in 2016.

=== Democratic primary ===
- Jeramey Anderson, state representative

==== Primary results ====
Democratic primary results
Party	Candidate	Votes	%
Democratic	Jeramey Anderson	14,560	100.0
Total votes		14,560	100.0

=== Republican primary ===
- Steven Palazzo, incumbent
- E. Brian Rose, entrepreneur and author

==== Primary results ====
Republican primary results
Party	Candidate	Votes	%
Republican	Steven Palazzo (incumbent)	30,270	70.5
Republican	E. Brian Rose	12,664	29.5
Total votes		42,934	100.0

=== General election ===
==== Predictions ====
Source	Ranking	As of
The Cook Political Report	Safe R	November 5, 2018
Inside Elections	Safe R	November 5, 2018
Sabato's Crystal Ball	Safe R	November 5, 2018
RCP	Safe R	November 5, 2018
Daily Kos	Safe R	November 5, 2018
538	Safe R	November 7, 2018
CNN	Safe R	October 31, 2018
Politico	Safe R	November 4, 2018

==== Polling ====
Poll source	Date(s) administered	Sample size	Margin of error	Steven Palazzo (R)	Jeramey Anderson (D)	Undecided
Triumph Campaigns	July 30–31, 2018	525	± 3.5%	54%	37%	10%

==== Results ====
2018 Mississippi's 4th congressional district election
Party	Candidate	Votes	%
Republican	Steven Palazzo (incumbent)	152,633	68.2
Democratic	Jeramey Anderson	68,787	30.7
Reform	Lajena Sheets	2,312	1.0
Total votes		223,732	100.0
Republican hold			

==== By county ====
County	Steven Palazzo Republican		Jeramey Anderson Democratic		Lajena Sheets Reform		Margin		Total
County	#	%	#	%	#	%	#	%	Total
Clarke (part)	355	44.65%	430	54.09%	10	1.26%	-75	-9.43%	795
Forrest	12,932	56.89%	9,598	42.23%	200	0.88%	3,334	14.67%	22,730
George	6,290	87.00%	881	12.19%	59	0.82%	5,409	74.81%	7,230
Greene	3,047	80.54%	710	18.77%	26	0.69%	2,337	61.78%	3,783
Hancock	10,355	74.41%	3,402	24.45%	159	1.14%	6,953	49.96%	13,916
Harrison	31,729	61.63%	19,059	37.02%	691	1.34%	12,670	24.61%	51,479
Jackson	26,490	66.34%	12,985	32.52%	455	1.14%	13,505	33.82%	39,930
Jones	15,658	70.40%	6,385	28.71%	198	0.89%	9,273	41.69%	22,241
Lamar	15,171	76.03%	4,601	23.06%	181	0.91%	10,570	52.97%	19,953
Marion	6,114	68.16%	2,804	31.26%	52	0.58%	3,310	36.90%	8,970
Pearl River	12,833	80.50%	2,967	18.61%	142	0.89%	9,866	61.89%	15,942
Perry	3,003	75.23%	947	23.72%	42	1.05%	2,056	51.50%	3,992
Stone	4,067	75.50%	1,272	23.61%	48	0.89%	2,795	51.88%	5,387
Wayne	4,589	62.15%	2,746	37.19%	49	0.66%	1,843	24.96%	7,384
Totals	152,633	68.22%	68,787	30.75%	2,312	1.03%	83,846	37.48%	223,732
