= Rod Hickman =

American politician

Member of the Mississippi State Senate from the 32nd district
- Incumbent
- Assumed office December 8, 2021
- Preceded by: Sampson Jackson

Personal details
- Born: Rodgrick Glenard Hickman; 1988 or 1989 (age 37–38) Shuqualak, Mississippi
- Party: Democratic
- Education: Noxubee County High School
- Alma mater: University of Mississippi (BA); University of Mississippi School of Law (JD)
- Occupation: Politician; lawyer; professor

Rodgrick Glenard Hickman is an American politician, serving in the Mississippi State Senate from the 32nd district since 2021. A Democrat, he won a special election to replace retiring state senator Sampson Jackson.

Born in Shuqualak, Mississippi, he graduated from the University of Mississippi with a Bachelor of Arts and a Juris Doctor from the University of Mississippi School of Law. He is an attorney at his own law practice, an adjunct law professor at Tougaloo College and the Mississippi University for Women, and a part-time prosecutor for Noxubee County, Mississippi.

== Early life and education ==
Hickman was born in Shuqualak, Mississippi. He graduated from Noxubee County High School in 2007. In high school, he was a board member for a smoking prevention and cessation organization.

He graduated from the University of Mississippi with a Bachelor of Arts and later a Juris Doctor magna cum laude from its School of Law. He served as an editor for the Mississippi Law Journal and on the executive board of the National Black Law Students Association.

== Career ==
After graduating from law school, he worked at a law firm specializing in employment law and premises liability litigation. He currently works as an attorney at his own practice. He is a law professor at Tougaloo College and the Mississippi University for Women.

In 2019, he was elected as the first Black County Attorney for Noxubee County, Mississippi. He was appointed municipal prosecutor for his hometown of Shuqualak in January 2020.

He won a special election runoff in 2021 for District 32 in the Mississippi State Senate to replace retiring Senator Sampson Jackson, who he received an endorsement from. Hickman was re-elected in 2023 without opposition in either the primary or general election.

== Personal life ==
He has one child and is Christian. He lives in Macon, Mississippi.

Hickman is a member of the NAACP, Magnolia Bar Association, National Bar Association, and the Alpha Phi Alpha fraternity.

== Electoral history ==
=== 2021 ===
2021 Mississippi Senate 32nd district special election
Party	Candidate	Votes	%
Nonpartisan	Rod Hickman	1,843	25.78%
Nonpartisan	Minh Duong	1,611	22.53%
Nonpartisan	Keith Jackson	936	13.09%
Nonpartisan	Kim Houston	913	12.77%
Nonpartisan	Stan Copeland	771	10.78%
Nonpartisan	James Creer	548	7.66%
Nonpartisan	Justin Creer	300	4.20%
Nonpartisan	W.J. Coleman	138	1.93%
Nonpartisan	Bradley Sudduth	90	1.26%
Total votes		7,150	100%

2021 Mississippi Senate 32nd district special runoff election
Party	Candidate	Votes	%
Nonpartisan	Rod Hickman	4,302	59.75%
Nonpartisan	Minh Duong	2,898	40.25%
Total votes		7,200	100%

=== 2023 ===
2023 Mississippi Senate 32nd district Democratic primary election
Party	Candidate	Votes	%
Democratic	Rod Hickman (incumbent)	7,917	100.0%
Total votes		7,917	100.0%

2023 Mississippi Senate 32nd district election
Party	Candidate	Votes	%
Democratic	Rod Hickman (incumbent)	12,200	100.0%
Total votes		12,200	100.0%
Democratic hold			
