= Chris Caughman =

American politician

Member of the Mississippi State Senate from the 35th district
- In office January 5, 2016 – January 2, 2024
- Preceded by: Perry Lee
- Succeeded by: Andy Berry

Personal details
- Born: October 14, 1967 (age 58) Mendenhall, Mississippi, U.S.
- Party: Republican

Chris Caughman (born October 14, 1967) is an American politician who served in the Mississippi State Senate, representing the 35th district from 2016 to 2024.
