= Gary Brumfield =

Mississippi politician

Member of the Mississippi State Senate from the 38th district
- Incumbent
- Assumed office January 2, 2024
- Preceded by: Kelvin Butler

Personal details
- Party: Democratic
- Education: Southwest Mississippi Community College (AA); Dallas Baptist University (BA); Anderson University (MMin)
- Occupation: Senior pastor

Gary Brumfield is a Mississippi politician, representing the 38th district in the Mississippi State Senate since 2024. His district represents Adams, Amite, Pike, Walthall, and Wilkinson counties.

== Early life and education ==
Brumfield attended McComb High School, graduating in 1988. He graduated from Southwest Mississippi Community College in 1992 with an Associate degree in industrial electricity and robotics. He graduated from Dallas Baptist University with a dual Bachelor's degree in Christian ministry and business management in 2008. He graduated with a Master of Ministry in 2022 from Anderson University. He is a senior pastor for a church in Pike County, Mississippi. He is the president of the Southwest Mississippi Minister's Union.

== Political career ==
A Democrat, Brumfield ran for office to the 38th district for the Mississippi State Senate in 2023. He ran uncontested in the Democratic primary. Incumbent Kelvin Butler, a former Democrat who filed as an independent, faced off against Brumfield in the general election. Brumfield won the election 50.5% to 39.2%, making Butler the only senator to lose reelection in the 2023 cycle. In the senate, Brumfield serves on the Ethics, Corrections, Economic and Workforce Development, Finance, Forestry, Highways and Transportation, Ports and Marine Resources, Technology, and Wildlife, Fisheries, and Park.

He is married and has three children. He is of Baptist faith.
