= List of United States representatives in the 116th Congress =

This is a complete list of United States representatives during the 116th United States Congress, which ran from January 3, 2019, through January 3, 2021, ordered by seniority.

== Seniority list ==
U.S. House of Representatives seniority
Rank	Representative	Party	District	Seniority date	Previous service	Notes
1	Don Young	R	Alaska at-large	March 6, 1973		Dean of the United States House of Representatives
2	Jim Sensenbrenner	R	Wisconsin 5	January 3, 1979		
3	Hal Rogers	R	Kentucky 5	January 3, 1981		
4	Chris Smith	R	New Jersey 4	January 3, 1981		
5	Steny Hoyer	D	Maryland 5	May 19, 1981		Majority Leader
6	Marcy Kaptur	D	Ohio 9	January 3, 1983		
7	Pete Visclosky	D	Indiana 1	January 3, 1985		
8	Peter DeFazio	D	Oregon 4	January 3, 1987		Chair: United States House of Representatives Committee on Transportation and Infrastructure
9	John Lewis	D	Georgia 5	January 3, 1987		Died on July 17, 2020.
10	Fred Upton	R	Michigan 6	January 3, 1987		
11	Nancy Pelosi	D	California 12	June 2, 1987		Speaker of the United States House of Representatives
12	Frank Pallone	D	New Jersey 6	November 8, 1988		Chair: United States House of Representatives Committee on Energy and Commerce
13	Eliot Engel	D	New York 16	January 3, 1989		Chair: United States House of Representatives Committee on Foreign Affairs
14	Nita Lowey	D	New York 17	January 3, 1989		Chair: United States House of Representatives Committee on Appropriations
15	Richard Neal	D	Massachusetts 1	January 3, 1989		Chair: United States House of Representatives Committee on Ways and Means
16	José E. Serrano	D	New York 15	March 20, 1990		
17	David Price	D	North Carolina 4	January 3, 1997	1987–1995	
18	Rosa DeLauro	D	Connecticut 3	January 3, 1991		
19	Collin Peterson	D	Minnesota 7	January 3, 1991		Chair: United States House of Representatives Committee on Agriculture
20	Maxine Waters	D	California 43	January 3, 1991		
21	Jerry Nadler	D	New York 10	November 3, 1992		Chair: Judiciary
22	Jim Cooper	D	Tennessee 5	January 3, 2003	1983–1995	
23	Sanford Bishop	D	Georgia 2	January 3, 1993		
24	Ken Calvert	R	California 42	January 3, 1993		
25	Jim Clyburn	D	South Carolina 6	January 3, 1993		Majority Whip
26	Anna Eshoo	D	California 18	January 3, 1993		
27	Alcee Hastings	D	Florida 20	January 3, 1993		
28	Eddie Bernice Johnson	D	Texas 30	January 3, 1993		Chair: United States House of Representatives Committee on Science, Space and Technology
29	Peter T. King	R	New York 2	January 3, 1993		
30	Carolyn Maloney	D	New York 12	January 3, 1993		
31	Lucille Roybal-Allard	D	California 40	January 3, 1993		
32	Bobby Rush	D	Illinois 1	January 3, 1993		
33	Bobby Scott	D	Virginia 3	January 3, 1993		Chair: United States House of Representatives Committee on Education and the Workforce labor
34	Nydia Velázquez	D	New York 7	January 3, 1993		Chair: United States House of Representatives Committee on Small Business
35	Bennie Thompson	D	Mississippi 2	April 13, 1993		Chair: United States House of Representatives Committee on Homeland Security
36	Frank Lucas	R	Oklahoma 3	May 10, 1994		
37	Lloyd Doggett	D	Texas 35	January 3, 1995		
38	Mike Doyle	D	Pennsylvania 18	January 3, 1995		
39	Sheila Jackson Lee	D	Texas 18	January 3, 1995		
40	Walter B. Jones Jr.	R	North Carolina 3	January 3, 1995		Died on February 10, 2019.
41	Zoe Lofgren	D	California 19	January 3, 1995		
42	Mac Thornberry	R	Texas 13	January 3, 1995		Ranking Member: Armed Services
43	Elijah Cummings	D	Maryland 7	April 16, 1996		Chair: Oversight and Government Reform; Died on October 17, 2019.
44	Earl Blumenauer	D	Oregon 3	May 21, 1996		
45	Robert Aderholt	R	Alabama 4	January 3, 1997		
46	Kevin Brady	R	Texas 8	January 3, 1997		Ranking Member: Ways and Means
47	Danny K. Davis	D	Illinois 7	January 3, 1997		
48	Diana DeGette	D	Colorado 1	January 3, 1997		
49	Kay Granger	R	Texas 12	January 3, 1997		Ranking Member: Appropriations
50	Ron Kind	D	Wisconsin 3	January 3, 1997		
51	Jim McGovern	D	Massachusetts 2	January 3, 1997		Chair: Rules
52	Bill Pascrell	D	New Jersey 9	January 3, 1997		
53	Brad Sherman	D	California 30	January 3, 1997		
54	John Shimkus	R	Illinois 15	January 3, 1997		
55	Adam Smith	D	Washington 9	January 3, 1997		Chair: Armed Services
56	Gregory Meeks	D	New York 5	February 3, 1998		
57	Barbara Lee	D	California 13	April 7, 1998		
58	Steve Chabot	R	Ohio 1	January 3, 2011	1995–2009	Ranking Member: Small Business
59	John B. Larson	D	Connecticut 1	January 3, 1999		
60	Grace Napolitano	D	California 32	January 3, 1999		
61	Jan Schakowsky	D	Illinois 9	January 3, 1999		
62	Mike Simpson	R	Idaho 2	January 3, 1999		
63	Mike Thompson	D	California 5	January 3, 1999		
64	Greg Walden	R	Oregon 2	January 3, 1999		Ranking Member: Energy and Commerce
65	Lacy Clay	D	Missouri 1	January 3, 2001		
66	Susan Davis	D	California 53	January 3, 2001		
67	Sam Graves	R	Missouri 6	January 3, 2001		Ranking Member: Transportation and Infrastructure
68	James Langevin	D	Rhode Island 2	January 3, 2001		
69	Rick Larsen	D	Washington 2	January 3, 2001		
70	Betty McCollum	D	Minnesota 4	January 3, 2001		
71	Adam Schiff	D	California 28	January 3, 2001		Chair: Intelligence
72	Stephen F. Lynch	D	Massachusetts 8	October 16, 2001		
73	Joe Wilson	R	South Carolina 2	December 18, 2001		
74	Rob Bishop	R	Utah 1	January 3, 2003		Ranking Member: Natural Resources
75	Michael C. Burgess	R	Texas 26	January 3, 2003		
76	John Carter	R	Texas 31	January 3, 2003		
77	Tom Cole	R	Oklahoma 4	January 3, 2003		
78	Mario Díaz-Balart	R	Florida 25	January 3, 2003		
79	Raúl Grijalva	D	Arizona 3	January 3, 2003		Chair: Natural Resources
80	Steve King	R	Iowa 4	January 3, 2003		
81	Devin Nunes	R	California 22	January 3, 2003		
82	Mike Rogers	R	Alabama 3	January 3, 2003		Ranking Member: Homeland Security
83	Dutch Ruppersberger	D	Maryland 2	January 3, 2003		
84	Tim Ryan	D	Ohio 13	January 3, 2003		
85	Linda Sánchez	D	California 38	January 3, 2003		
86	David Scott	D	Georgia 13	January 3, 2003		
87	Mike Turner	R	Ohio 10	January 3, 2003		
88	G. K. Butterfield	D	North Carolina 1	July 20, 2004		
89	Emanuel Cleaver	D	Missouri 5	January 3, 2005		
90	Mike Conaway	R	Texas 11	January 3, 2005		Ranking Member: Agriculture
91	Jim Costa	D	California 16	January 3, 2005		
92	Henry Cuellar	D	Texas 28	January 3, 2005		
93	Jeff Fortenberry	R	Nebraska 1	January 3, 2005		
94	Virginia Foxx	R	North Carolina 5	January 3, 2005		Ranking Member: Education and Labor
95	Louie Gohmert	R	Texas 1	January 3, 2005		
96	Al Green	D	Texas 9	January 3, 2005		
97	Brian Higgins	D	New York 26	January 3, 2005		
98	Dan Lipinski	D	Illinois 3	January 3, 2005		
99	Kenny Marchant	R	Texas 24	January 3, 2005		
100	Michael McCaul	R	Texas 10	January 3, 2005		Ranking Member: Foreign Affairs
101	Patrick McHenry	R	North Carolina 10	January 3, 2005		Ranking Member: Financial Services
102	Cathy McMorris Rodgers	R	Washington 5	January 3, 2005		
103	Gwen Moore	D	Wisconsin 4	January 3, 2005		
104	Debbie Wasserman Schultz	D	Florida 23	January 3, 2005		
105	Doris Matsui	D	California 6	March 8, 2005		
106	Albio Sires	D	New Jersey 8	November 7, 2006		
107	Gus Bilirakis	R	Florida 12	January 3, 2007		
108	Vern Buchanan	R	Florida 16	January 3, 2007		
109	Kathy Castor	D	Florida 14	January 3, 2007		
110	Yvette Clarke	D	New York 9	January 3, 2007		
111	Steve Cohen	D	Tennessee 9	January 3, 2007		
112	Joe Courtney	D	Connecticut 2	January 3, 2007		
113	Hank Johnson	D	Georgia 4	January 3, 2007		
114	Jim Jordan	R	Ohio 4	January 3, 2007		Ranking Member: Oversight and Government Reform
115	Doug Lamborn	R	Colorado 5	January 3, 2007		
116	Dave Loebsack	D	Iowa 2	January 3, 2007		
117	Kevin McCarthy	R	California 23	January 3, 2007		Minority Leader
118	Jerry McNerney	D	California 9	January 3, 2007		
119	Ed Perlmutter	D	Colorado 7	January 3, 2007		
120	John Sarbanes	D	Maryland 3	January 3, 2007		
121	Adrian Smith	R	Nebraska 3	January 3, 2007		
122	Peter Welch	D	Vermont at-large	January 3, 2007		
123	John Yarmuth	D	Kentucky 3	January 3, 2007		Chair: Budget
124	Bob Latta	R	Ohio 5	December 11, 2007		
125	Rob Wittman	R	Virginia 1	December 11, 2007		
126	André Carson	D	Indiana 7	March 11, 2008		
127	Jackie Speier	D	California 14	April 8, 2008		
128	Steve Scalise	R	Louisiana 1	May 3, 2008		Minority Whip
129	Marcia Fudge	D	Ohio 11	November 18, 2008		
130	Gerry Connolly	D	Virginia 11	January 3, 2009		
131	Brett Guthrie	R	Kentucky 2	January 3, 2009		
132	Jim Himes	D	Connecticut 4	January 3, 2009		
133	Duncan D. Hunter	R	California 50	January 3, 2009		Resigned on January 13, 2020.
134	Blaine Luetkemeyer	R	Missouri 3	January 3, 2009		
135	Ben Ray Luján	D	New Mexico 3	January 3, 2009		
136	Tom McClintock	R	California 4	January 3, 2009		
137	Pete Olson	R	Texas 22	January 3, 2009		
138	Chellie Pingree	D	Maine 1	January 3, 2009		
139	Bill Posey	R	Florida 8	January 3, 2009		
140	Phil Roe	R	Tennessee 1	January 3, 2009		Ranking Member: Veterans' Affairs
141	Kurt Schrader	D	Oregon 5	January 3, 2009		
142	Glenn Thompson	R	Pennsylvania 15	January 3, 2009		
143	Paul Tonko	D	New York 20	January 3, 2009		
144	Mike Quigley	D	Illinois 5	April 7, 2009		
145	Judy Chu	D	California 27	July 14, 2009		
146	John Garamendi	D	California 3	November 3, 2009		
147	Ted Deutch	D	Florida 22	April 13, 2010		Chair: Ethics
148	Tom Graves	R	Georgia 14	June 8, 2010		Resigned on October 4, 2020.
149	Tom Reed	R	New York 23	November 2, 2010		
150	Tim Walberg	R	Michigan 7	January 3, 2011	2007–2009	
151	Bill Foster	D	Illinois 11	January 3, 2013	2008–2011	
152	Kweisi Mfume	D	Maryland 7	April 28, 2020	1987–1996	
153	Justin Amash	R	Michigan 3	January 3, 2011		Switched to Independent on July 4, 2019. Switched to Libertarian on May 1, 2020.
154	Karen Bass	D	California 37	January 3, 2011		
155	Mo Brooks	R	Alabama 5	January 3, 2011		
156	Larry Bucshon	R	Indiana 8	January 3, 2011		
157	David Cicilline	D	Rhode Island 1	January 3, 2011		
158	Rick Crawford	R	Arkansas 1	January 3, 2011		
159	Scott DesJarlais	R	Tennessee 4	January 3, 2011		
160	Sean Duffy	R	Wisconsin 7	January 3, 2011		Resigned on September 23, 2019.
161	Jeff Duncan	R	South Carolina 3	January 3, 2011		
162	Chuck Fleischmann	R	Tennessee 3	January 3, 2011		
163	Bill Flores	R	Texas 17	January 3, 2011		
164	Bob Gibbs	R	Ohio 7	January 3, 2011		
165	Paul Gosar	R	Arizona 4	January 3, 2011		
166	Morgan Griffith	R	Virginia 9	January 3, 2011		
167	Andy Harris	R	Maryland 1	January 3, 2011		
168	Vicky Hartzler	R	Missouri 4	January 3, 2011		
169	Jaime Herrera Beutler	R	Washington 3	January 3, 2011		
170	Bill Huizenga	R	Michigan 2	January 3, 2011		
171	Bill Johnson	R	Ohio 6	January 3, 2011		
172	Bill Keating	D	Massachusetts 9	January 3, 2011		
173	Mike Kelly	R	Pennsylvania 16	January 3, 2011		
174	Adam Kinzinger	R	Illinois 16	January 3, 2011		
175	Billy Long	R	Missouri 7	January 3, 2011		
176	Tom Marino	R	Pennsylvania 12	January 3, 2011		Resigned on January 23, 2019.
177	David McKinley	R	West Virginia 1	January 3, 2011		
178	Steven Palazzo	R	Mississippi 4	January 3, 2011		
179	Cedric Richmond	D	Louisiana 2	January 3, 2011		
180	Martha Roby	R	Alabama 2	January 3, 2011		
181	David Schweikert	R	Arizona 6	January 3, 2011		
182	Austin Scott	R	Georgia 8	January 3, 2011		
183	Terri Sewell	D	Alabama 7	January 3, 2011		
184	Steve Stivers	R	Ohio 15	January 3, 2011		
185	Scott Tipton	R	Colorado 3	January 3, 2011		
186	Daniel Webster	R	Florida 11	January 3, 2011		
187	Frederica Wilson	D	Florida 24	January 3, 2011		
188	Steve Womack	R	Arkansas 3	January 3, 2011		Ranking Member: Budget
189	Rob Woodall	R	Georgia 7	January 3, 2011		
190	Mark Amodei	R	Nevada 2	September 13, 2011		
191	Suzanne Bonamici	D	Oregon 1	January 31, 2012		
192	Suzan DelBene	D	Washington 1	November 6, 2012		
193	Thomas Massie	R	Kentucky 4	November 6, 2012		
194	Donald Payne Jr.	D	New Jersey 10	November 6, 2012		
195	Dina Titus	D	Nevada 1	January 3, 2013	2009–2011	
196	Andy Barr	R	Kentucky 6	January 3, 2013		
197	Joyce Beatty	D	Ohio 3	January 3, 2013		
198	Ami Bera	D	California 7	January 3, 2013		
199	Susan Brooks	R	Indiana 5	January 3, 2013		Ranking Member: Ethics
200	Julia Brownley	D	California 26	January 3, 2013		
201	Cheri Bustos	D	Illinois 17	January 3, 2013		
202	Tony Cárdenas	D	California 29	January 3, 2013		
203	Matt Cartwright	D	Pennsylvania 8	January 3, 2013		
204	Joaquin Castro	D	Texas 20	January 3, 2013		
205	Chris Collins	R	New York 27	January 3, 2013		Resigned on October 1, 2019.
206	Doug Collins	R	Georgia 9	January 3, 2013		Ranking Member: Judiciary
207	Paul Cook	R	California 8	January 3, 2013		Resigned on December 7, 2020.
208	Rodney Davis	R	Illinois 13	January 3, 2013		
209	Lois Frankel	D	Florida 21	January 3, 2013		
210	Tulsi Gabbard	D	Hawaii 2	January 3, 2013		
211	Denny Heck	D	Washington 10	January 3, 2013		
212	George Holding	R	North Carolina 2	January 3, 2013		
213	Richard Hudson	R	North Carolina 8	January 3, 2013		
214	Jared Huffman	D	California 2	January 3, 2013		
215	Hakeem Jeffries	D	New York 8	January 3, 2013		Democratic Caucus Chair
216	David Joyce	R	Ohio 14	January 3, 2013		
217	Joe Kennedy III	D	Massachusetts 4	January 3, 2013		
218	Dan Kildee	D	Michigan 5	January 3, 2013		
219	Derek Kilmer	D	Washington 6	January 3, 2013		
220	Annie Kuster	D	New Hampshire 2	January 3, 2013		
221	Doug LaMalfa	R	California 1	January 3, 2013		
222	Alan Lowenthal	D	California 47	January 3, 2013		
223	Sean Patrick Maloney	D	New York 18	January 3, 2013		
224	Mark Meadows	R	North Carolina 11	January 3, 2013		Resigned on March 30, 2020.
225	Grace Meng	D	New York 6	January 3, 2013		
226	Markwayne Mullin	R	Oklahoma 2	January 3, 2013		
227	Scott Perry	R	Pennsylvania 10	January 3, 2013		
228	Scott Peters	D	California 52	January 3, 2013		
229	Mark Pocan	D	Wisconsin 2	January 3, 2013		
230	Tom Rice	R	South Carolina 7	January 3, 2013		
231	Raul Ruiz	D	California 36	January 3, 2013		
232	Chris Stewart	R	Utah 2	January 3, 2013		
233	Eric Swalwell	D	California 15	January 3, 2013		
234	Mark Takano	D	California 41	January 3, 2013		
235	Juan Vargas	D	California 51	January 3, 2013		
236	Marc Veasey	D	Texas 33	January 3, 2013		
237	Filemon Vela Jr.	D	Texas 34	January 3, 2013		
238	Ann Wagner	R	Missouri 2	January 3, 2013		
239	Jackie Walorski	R	Indiana 2	January 3, 2013		
240	Randy Weber	R	Texas 14	January 3, 2013		
241	Brad Wenstrup	R	Ohio 2	January 3, 2013		
242	Roger Williams	R	Texas 25	January 3, 2013		
243	Ted Yoho	R	Florida 3	January 3, 2013		
244	Robin Kelly	D	Illinois 2	April 9, 2013		
245	Jason Smith	R	Missouri 8	June 4, 2013		
246	Katherine Clark	D	Massachusetts 5	December 10, 2013		
247	Bradley Byrne	R	Alabama 1	December 17, 2013		
248	Alma Adams	D	North Carolina 12	November 4, 2014		
249	Donald Norcross	D	New Jersey 1	November 4, 2014		
250	Ann Kirkpatrick	D	Arizona 2	January 3, 2019	2009–2011; 2013–2017	
251	Ed Case	D	Hawaii 1	January 3, 2019	2002–2007	
252	Ralph Abraham	R	Louisiana 5	January 3, 2015		
253	Pete Aguilar	D	California 31	January 3, 2015		
254	Rick W. Allen	R	Georgia 12	January 3, 2015		
255	Brian Babin	R	Texas 36	January 3, 2015		
256	Don Beyer	D	Virginia 8	January 3, 2015		
257	Mike Bost	R	Illinois 12	January 3, 2015		
258	Brendan Boyle	D	Pennsylvania 2	January 3, 2015		
259	Ken Buck	R	Colorado 4	January 3, 2015		
260	Buddy Carter	R	Georgia 1	January 3, 2015		
261	Mark DeSaulnier	D	California 11	January 3, 2015		
262	Debbie Dingell	D	Michigan 12	January 3, 2015		
263	Tom Emmer	R	Minnesota 6	January 3, 2015		
264	Ruben Gallego	D	Arizona 7	January 3, 2015		
265	Garret Graves	R	Louisiana 6	January 3, 2015		
266	Glenn Grothman	R	Wisconsin 6	January 3, 2015		
267	Jody Hice	R	Georgia 10	January 3, 2015		
268	French Hill	R	Arkansas 2	January 3, 2015		
269	Will Hurd	R	Texas 23	January 3, 2015		
270	John Katko	R	New York 24	January 3, 2015		
271	Brenda Lawrence	D	Michigan 14	January 3, 2015		
272	Ted Lieu	D	California 33	January 3, 2015		
273	Barry Loudermilk	R	Georgia 11	January 3, 2015		
274	John Moolenaar	R	Michigan 4	January 3, 2015		
275	Alex Mooney	R	West Virginia 2	January 3, 2015		
276	Seth Moulton	D	Massachusetts 6	January 3, 2015		
277	Dan Newhouse	R	Washington 4	January 3, 2015		
278	Gary Palmer	R	Alabama 6	January 3, 2015		
279	John Ratcliffe	R	Texas 4	January 3, 2015		Resigned on May 22, 2020.
280	Kathleen Rice	D	New York 4	January 3, 2015		
281	David Rouzer	R	North Carolina 7	January 3, 2015		
282	Elise Stefanik	R	New York 21	January 3, 2015		
283	Norma Torres	D	California 35	January 3, 2015		
284	Mark Walker	R	North Carolina 6	January 3, 2015		
285	Bonnie Watson Coleman	D	New Jersey 12	January 3, 2015		
286	Bruce Westerman	R	Arkansas 4	January 3, 2015		
287	Lee Zeldin	R	New York 1	January 3, 2015		
288	Trent Kelly	R	Mississippi 1	June 2, 2015		
289	Darin LaHood	R	Illinois 18	September 10, 2015		
290	Warren Davidson	R	Ohio 8	June 7, 2016		
291	James Comer	R	Kentucky 1	November 8, 2016		
292	Dwight Evans	D	Pennsylvania 3	November 8, 2016		
293	Brad Schneider	D	Illinois 10	January 3, 2017	2013–2015	
294	Jodey Arrington	R	Texas 19	January 3, 2017		
295	Don Bacon	R	Nebraska 2	January 3, 2017		
296	Jim Banks	R	Indiana 3	January 3, 2017		
297	Nanette Barragán	D	California 44	January 3, 2017		
298	Jack Bergman	R	Michigan 1	January 3, 2017		
299	Andy Biggs	R	Arizona 5	January 3, 2017		
300	Lisa Blunt Rochester	D	Delaware at-large	January 3, 2017		
301	Anthony Brown	D	Maryland 4	January 3, 2017		
302	Ted Budd	R	North Carolina 13	January 3, 2017		
303	Salud Carbajal	D	California 24	January 3, 2017		
304	Liz Cheney	R	Wyoming at-large	January 3, 2017		Republican Conference Chairwoman
305	Lou Correa	D	California 46	January 3, 2017		
306	Charlie Crist	D	Florida 13	January 3, 2017		
307	Val Demings	D	Florida 10	January 3, 2017		
308	Neal Dunn	R	Florida 2	January 3, 2017		
309	Adriano Espaillat	D	New York 13	January 3, 2017		
310	Drew Ferguson	R	Georgia 3	January 3, 2017		
311	Brian Fitzpatrick	R	Pennsylvania 1	January 3, 2017		
312	Matt Gaetz	R	Florida 1	January 3, 2017		
313	Mike Gallagher	R	Wisconsin 8	January 3, 2017		
314	Vicente Gonzalez	D	Texas 15	January 3, 2017		
315	Josh Gottheimer	D	New Jersey 5	January 3, 2017		
316	Clay Higgins	R	Louisiana 3	January 3, 2017		
317	Trey Hollingsworth	R	Indiana 9	January 3, 2017		
318	Pramila Jayapal	D	Washington 7	January 3, 2017		
319	Mike Johnson	R	Louisiana 4	January 3, 2017		
320	Ro Khanna	D	California 17	January 3, 2017		
321	Raja Krishnamoorthi	D	Illinois 8	January 3, 2017		
322	David Kustoff	R	Tennessee 8	January 3, 2017		
323	Al Lawson	D	Florida 5	January 3, 2017		
324	Roger Marshall	R	Kansas 1	January 3, 2017		
325	Brian Mast	R	Florida 18	January 3, 2017		
326	Donald McEachin	D	Virginia 4	January 3, 2017		
327	Paul Mitchell	R	Michigan 10	January 3, 2017		Switched to Independent on December 14, 2020.
328	Stephanie Murphy	D	Florida 7	January 3, 2017		
329	Tom O'Halleran	D	Arizona 1	January 3, 2017		
330	Jimmy Panetta	D	California 20	January 3, 2017		
331	Jamie Raskin	D	Maryland 8	January 3, 2017		
332	Francis Rooney	R	Florida 19	January 3, 2017		
333	John Rutherford	R	Florida 4	January 3, 2017		
334	Lloyd Smucker	R	Pennsylvania 11	January 3, 2017		
335	Darren Soto	D	Florida 9	January 3, 2017		
336	Thomas Suozzi	D	New York 3	January 3, 2017		
337	Ron Estes	R	Kansas 4	April 11, 2017		
338	Jimmy Gomez	D	California 34	June 6, 2017		
339	Ralph Norman	R	South Carolina 5	June 20, 2017		
340	Greg Gianforte	R	Montana at-large	June 21, 2017		
341	John Curtis	R	Utah 3	November 7, 2017		
342	Conor Lamb	D	Pennsylvania 17	March 13, 2018		
343	Debbie Lesko	R	Arizona 8	April 24, 2018		
344	Michael Cloud	R	Texas 27	June 30, 2018		
345	Troy Balderson	R	Ohio 12	August 7, 2018		
346	Kevin Hern	R	Oklahoma 1	November 6, 2018		
347	Joseph Morelle	D	New York 25	November 6, 2018		
348	Mary Gay Scanlon	D	Pennsylvania 5	November 6, 2018		
349	Susan Wild	D	Pennsylvania 7	November 6, 2018		
350	Steven Horsford	D	Nevada 4	January 3, 2019	2013–2015	
351	Colin Allred	D	Texas 32	January 3, 2019		
352	Kelly Armstrong	R	North Dakota at-large	January 3, 2019		
353	Cindy Axne	D	Iowa 3	January 3, 2019		
354	Jim Baird	R	Indiana 4	January 3, 2019		
355	Anthony Brindisi	D	New York 22	January 3, 2019		
356	Tim Burchett	R	Tennessee 2	January 3, 2019		
357	Sean Casten	D	Illinois 6	January 3, 2019		
358	Gil Cisneros	D	California 39	January 3, 2019		
359	Ben Cline	R	Virginia 6	January 3, 2019		
360	TJ Cox	D	California 21	January 3, 2019		
361	Angie Craig	D	Minnesota 2	January 3, 2019		
362	Dan Crenshaw	R	Texas 2	January 3, 2019		
363	Jason Crow	D	Colorado 6	January 3, 2019		
364	Joe Cunningham	D	South Carolina 1	January 3, 2019		
365	Sharice Davids	D	Kansas 3	January 3, 2019		
366	Madeleine Dean	D	Pennsylvania 4	January 3, 2019		
367	Antonio Delgado	D	New York 19	January 3, 2019		
368	Veronica Escobar	D	Texas 16	January 3, 2019		
369	Abby Finkenauer	D	Iowa 1	January 3, 2019		
370	Russ Fulcher	R	Idaho 1	January 3, 2019		
371	Chuy García	D	Illinois 4	January 3, 2019		
372	Sylvia Garcia	D	Texas 29	January 3, 2019		
373	Jared Golden	D	Maine 2	January 3, 2019		
374	Anthony Gonzalez	R	Ohio 16	January 3, 2019		
375	Lance Gooden	R	Texas 5	January 3, 2019		
376	Mark Green	R	Tennessee 7	January 3, 2019		
377	Michael Guest	R	Mississippi 3	January 3, 2019		
378	Deb Haaland	D	New Mexico 1	January 3, 2019		
379	Jim Hagedorn	R	Minnesota 1	January 3, 2019		
380	Josh Harder	D	California 10	January 3, 2019		
381	Jahana Hayes	D	Connecticut 5	January 3, 2019		
382	Katie Hill	D	California 25	January 3, 2019		Resigned on November 3, 2019.
383	Kendra Horn	D	Oklahoma 5	January 3, 2019		
384	Chrissy Houlahan	D	Pennsylvania 6	January 3, 2019		
385	Dusty Johnson	R	South Dakota at-large	January 3, 2019		
386	John Joyce	R	Pennsylvania 13	January 3, 2019		
387	Andy Kim	D	New Jersey 3	January 3, 2019		
388	Susie Lee	D	Nevada 3	January 3, 2019		
389	Andy Levin	D	Michigan 9	January 3, 2019		
390	Mike Levin	D	California 49	January 3, 2019		
391	Elaine Luria	D	Virginia 2	January 3, 2019		
392	Tom Malinowski	D	New Jersey 7	January 3, 2019		
393	Ben McAdams	D	Utah 4	January 3, 2019		
394	Lucy McBath	D	Georgia 6	January 3, 2019		
395	Dan Meuser	R	Pennsylvania 9	January 3, 2019		
396	Carol Miller	R	West Virginia 3	January 3, 2019		
397	Debbie Mucarsel-Powell	D	Florida 26	January 3, 2019		
398	Joe Neguse	D	Colorado 2	January 3, 2019		
399	Alexandria Ocasio-Cortez	D	New York 14	January 3, 2019		
400	Ilhan Omar	D	Minnesota 5	January 3, 2019		
401	Lizzie Fletcher	D	Texas 7	January 3, 2019		
402	Chris Pappas	D	New Hampshire 1	January 3, 2019		
403	Greg Pence	R	Indiana 6	January 3, 2019		
404	Dean Phillips	D	Minnesota 3	January 3, 2019		
405	Katie Porter	D	California 45	January 3, 2019		
406	Ayanna Pressley	D	Massachusetts 7	January 3, 2019		
407	Guy Reschenthaler	R	Pennsylvania 14	January 3, 2019		
408	Denver Riggleman	R	Virginia 5	January 3, 2019		
409	John Rose	R	Tennessee 6	January 3, 2019		
410	Max Rose	D	New York 11	January 3, 2019		
411	Harley Rouda	D	California 48	January 3, 2019		
412	Chip Roy	R	Texas 21	January 3, 2019		
413	Kim Schrier	D	Washington 8	January 3, 2019		
414	Donna Shalala	D	Florida 27	January 3, 2019		
415	Mikie Sherrill	D	New Jersey 11	January 3, 2019		
416	Elissa Slotkin	D	Michigan 8	January 3, 2019		
417	Abigail Spanberger	D	Virginia 7	January 3, 2019		
418	Ross Spano	R	Florida 15	January 3, 2019		
419	Greg Stanton	D	Arizona 9	January 3, 2019		
420	Pete Stauber	R	Minnesota 8	January 3, 2019		
421	Bryan Steil	R	Wisconsin 1	January 3, 2019		
422	Greg Steube	R	Florida 17	January 3, 2019		
423	Haley Stevens	D	Michigan 11	January 3, 2019		
424	Van Taylor	R	Texas 3	January 3, 2019		
425	William Timmons	R	South Carolina 4	January 3, 2019		
426	Rashida Tlaib	D	Michigan 13	January 3, 2019		
427	Xochitl Torres Small	D	New Mexico 2	January 3, 2019		
428	Lori Trahan	D	Massachusetts 3	January 3, 2019		
429	David Trone	D	Maryland 6	January 3, 2019		
430	Lauren Underwood	D	Illinois 14	January 3, 2019		
431	Jeff Van Drew	D	New Jersey 2	January 3, 2019		Switched to Republican on December 19, 2019.
432	Michael Waltz	R	Florida 6	January 3, 2019		
433	Steve Watkins	R	Kansas 2	January 3, 2019		
434	Jennifer Wexton	D	Virginia 10	January 3, 2019		
435	Ron Wright	R	Texas 6	January 3, 2019		
	Fred Keller	R	Pennsylvania 12	May 21, 2019		
	Dan Bishop	R	North Carolina 9	September 10, 2019		
	Greg Murphy	R	North Carolina 3	September 10, 2019		
	Mike Garcia	R	California 25	May 12, 2020		
	Tom Tiffany	R	Wisconsin 7	May 12, 2020		
	Chris Jacobs	R	New York 27	June 23, 2020		
	Kwanza Hall	D	Georgia 5	December 1, 2020		

== Delegates ==
Rank	Delegate	Party	District	Seniority date (previous service, if any)	Notes
1	Eleanor Holmes Norton	D	District of Columbia at-large	January 3, 1991	
2	Gregorio Sablan	I	Northern Mariana Islands at-large	January 3, 2009	
3	Stacey Plaskett	D	United States Virgin Islands at-large	January 3, 2015	
4	Amata Coleman Radewagen	R	American Samoa at-large	January 3, 2015	
5	Jenniffer González	NPP/R	Puerto Rico at-large	January 3, 2017	
6	Michael San Nicolas	D	Guam at-large	January 3, 2019	

== See also ==
- List of current United States representatives
- List of United States congressional districts
- List of United States senators in the 116th Congress
- Seniority in the United States House of Representatives
