= Sally Doty =

American politician

Member of the Mississippi State Senate from the 39th district
- In office January 10, 2012 – July 16, 2020
- Preceded by: Cindy Hyde-Smith
- Succeeded by: Jason Barrett

Personal details
- Born: December 22, 1966 (age 59) Kosciusko, Mississippi, U.S.
- Party: Republican
- Children: 3
- Education: Mississippi University for Women; Mississippi College School of Law (JD)
- Occupation: Attorney
- Website: sallydoty.com

Sally Doty (born December 22, 1966) is an American attorney and politician who served as the Republican member of the Mississippi Senate, representing the 39th District from 2012 to 2020.

== Early life and education ==
Born in Kosciusko, Mississippi, Doty graduated from Kosciusko High School in 1984. She is a graduate of Mississippi University for Women and earned a Juris Doctor from the Mississippi College School of Law.

Doty chaired the Mississippi Senate Energy Committee. She served as one of five Senators appointed by the Lieutenant Governor to the Joint Legislative Budget Committee. She served as Vice-Chair of Judiciary A, and is a member of the following committees: Finance, Economic Development, Banking and Financial Institutions, Public Health, Highways and Transportation, Public Property, and Drug Policy.

In the spring of 2018, Doty was a candidate in the Republican primary for the United States House of Representatives to fill the seat held by retiring Rep. Gregg Harper (MS-3).

Doty was appointed by Gov. Tate Reeves to the executive director position of the Mississippi Public Utilities Staff; she resigned from her senate seat on July 16, 2020. She was later appointed director of the office of broadband, known as BEAM, for Mississippi.
