= Philip Moran =

American politician

Member of the Mississippi State Senate from the 46th district
- In office January 3, 2012 – January 2, 2024
- Preceded by: David Baria
- Succeeded by: Philman Ladner

Personal details
- Born: Philip Edward Moran; March 6, 1961 (age 65) Bay St. Louis, Mississippi, U.S.
- Party: Republican
- Spouse: Sheila Morris
- Education: Mississippi State University

Philip Edward Moran (born March 6, 1961) is an American politician. A member of the Republican Party, he served in the Mississippi State Senate from 2012 to 2024. He lives in Kiln, Mississippi with his wife, Sheila.
