= List of United States senators in the 116th Congress =

This is a complete list of United States senators during the 116th United States Congress listed by seniority from January 3, 2019, to January 3, 2021. It is a historical listing and will contain people who have not served the entire two-year Congress should anyone resign, die, or be expelled.

In this Congress, Kyrsten Sinema is the most junior senior senator and Maria Cantwell is the most senior junior senator.

Order of service is based on the commencement of the senator's first term. Behind this is former service as a senator (only giving the senator seniority within their new incoming class), service as vice president, a House member, a cabinet secretary, or a governor of a state. The final factor is the population of the senator's state.

== Terms of service ==
Class	Terms of service of senators that expired or will expire in years
Class 2	Terms of service of senators that expired in 2021 (Alabama, Alaska, Arkansas, Colorado, Delaware, Georgia, Iowa, Idaho, Illinois, Kansas, Kentucky, Louisiana, Massachusetts, Maine, Michigan, Minnesota, Mississippi, Montana, North Carolina, Nebraska, New Hampshire, New Jersey, New Mexico, Oklahoma, Oregon, Rhode Island, South Carolina, South Dakota, Tennessee, Texas, Virginia, West Virginia, and Wyoming.)
Class 3	Terms of service of senators that expired in 2023 (Alabama, Alaska, Arizona, Arkansas, California, Colorado, Connecticut, Delaware, Florida, Georgia, Hawaii, Idaho, Illinois, Iowa, Indiana, Kansas, Kentucky, Louisiana, Massachusetts, Maine, Michigan, Minnesota, Mississippi, North Carolina, North Dakota, New Hampshire, New Mexico, Nevada, New York, Oklahoma, Oregon, South Carolina, South Dakota, Tennessee, Utah, Washington and Wisconsin.)
Class 1	Terms of service of senators that expired in 2025 (Arizona, California, Connecticut, Delaware, Florida, Hawaii, Indiana, Maine, Maryland, Massachusetts, Michigan, Minnesota, Mississippi, Missouri, Montana, Nebraska, Nevada, New Jersey, New Mexico, New York, North Dakota, Ohio, Pennsylvania, Rhode Island, Tennessee, Texas, Utah, Vermont, Virginia, Washington, West Virginia, Wisconsin, and Wyoming.)

== U.S. Senate seniority list ==
Rank	Historical rank	Senator	Party	State	Seniority date	Other factors
1	1692	Patrick Leahy	Democratic	Vermont	January 3, 1975	
2	1743	Chuck Grassley	Republican	Iowa	January 3, 1981	
3	1766	Mitch McConnell	Republican	Kentucky	January 3, 1985	
4	1775	Richard Shelby	Republican	Alabama	January 3, 1987	
5	1801	Dianne Feinstein	Democratic	California	November 10, 1992	
6	1812	Patty Murray	Democratic	Washington	January 3, 1993	
7	1816	Jim Inhofe	Republican	Oklahoma	November 17, 1994	
8	1827	Ron Wyden	Democratic	Oregon	February 6, 1996	
9	1830	Pat Roberts	Republican	Kansas	January 3, 1997	Former member of the U.S. House of Representatives (16 years)
10	1831	Dick Durbin	Democratic	Illinois	January 3, 1997	Former member of the U.S. House of Representatives (14 years)
11	1835	Jack Reed	Democratic	Rhode Island	January 3, 1997	Former member of the U.S. House of Representatives (6 years)
12	1842	Susan Collins	Republican	Maine	January 3, 1997	Maine 38th in population (1990)
13	1843	Mike Enzi	Republican	Wyoming	January 3, 1997	Wyoming 50th in population (1990)
14	1844	Chuck Schumer	Democratic	New York	January 3, 1999	Former member of the U.S. House of Representatives (18 years)
15	1846	Mike Crapo	Republican	Idaho	January 3, 1999	Former member of the U.S. House of Representatives (6 years)
16	1855	Tom Carper	Democratic	Delaware	January 3, 2001	Former member of the U.S. House of Representatives (10 years)
17	1856	Debbie Stabenow	Democratic	Michigan	January 3, 2001	Former member of the U.S. House of Representatives (4 years)
18	1859	Maria Cantwell	Democratic	Washington	January 3, 2001	Former member of the U.S. House of Representatives (2 years)
19	1873	John Cornyn	Republican	Texas	December 1, 2002	
20	1867	Lisa Murkowski	Republican	Alaska	December 20, 2002	
21	1869	Lindsey Graham	Republican	South Carolina	January 3, 2003	Former member of the U.S. House of Representatives
22	1871	Lamar Alexander	Republican	Tennessee	January 3, 2003	Former cabinet member
23	1876	Richard Burr	Republican	North Carolina	January 3, 2005	Former member of the U.S. House of Representatives (10 years)
24	1879	John Thune	Republican	South Dakota	January 3, 2005	Former member of the U.S. House of Representatives (6 years)
25	1880	Johnny Isakson (Note: In Georgia, Johnny Isakson (R) resigned December 31, 2019. He was replaced by Kelly Loeffler (R), who was appointed by Governor Brian Kemp.)	Republican	Georgia	January 3, 2005	Former member of the U.S. House of Representatives (5 years, 10 months)
26	1885	Bob Menendez	Democratic	New Jersey	January 18, 2006	
27	1886	Ben Cardin	Democratic	Maryland	January 3, 2007	Former member of the U.S. House of Representatives (20 years)
28	1887	Bernie Sanders	Independent	Vermont	January 3, 2007	Former member of the U.S. House of Representatives (16 years) (Note: Although Sanders was a candidate for the 2016 Democratic presidential nomination, and votes with the Democrats for organizational purposes, he has been elected and classified as an Independent throughout his time in Congress.)
29	1888	Sherrod Brown	Democratic	Ohio	January 3, 2007	Former member of the U.S. House of Representatives (14 years)
30	1889	Bob Casey Jr.	Democratic	Pennsylvania	January 3, 2007	Pennsylvania 6th in population (2000)
31	1893	Amy Klobuchar	Democratic	Minnesota	January 3, 2007	Minnesota 21st in population (2000)
32	1894	Sheldon Whitehouse	Democratic	Rhode Island	January 3, 2007	Rhode Island 43rd in population (2000)
33	1895	Jon Tester	Democratic	Montana	January 3, 2007	Montana 44th in population (2000)
34	1896	John Barrasso	Republican	Wyoming	June 25, 2007	
35	1897	Roger Wicker	Republican	Mississippi	December 31, 2007	
36	1899	Tom Udall	Democratic	New Mexico	January 3, 2009	Former member of the U.S. House of Representatives
37	1901	Jeanne Shaheen	Democratic	New Hampshire	January 3, 2009	Former governor (6 years)
38	1902	Mark Warner	Democratic	Virginia	January 3, 2009	Former governor (4 years)
39	1903	Jim Risch	Republican	Idaho	January 3, 2009	Former governor (7 months)
40	1905	Jeff Merkley	Democratic	Oregon	January 3, 2009	
41	1909	Michael Bennet	Democratic	Colorado	January 21, 2009	
42	1910	Kirsten Gillibrand	Democratic	New York	January 26, 2009	
43	1916	Joe Manchin	Democratic	West Virginia	November 15, 2010	Former governor
44	1917	Chris Coons	Democratic	Delaware	November 15, 2010	
45	1919	Roy Blunt	Republican	Missouri	January 3, 2011	Former member of the U.S. House of Representatives (14 years); Missouri 17th in population (2000)
46	1920	Jerry Moran	Republican	Kansas	January 3, 2011	Former member of the U.S. House of Representatives (14 years); Kansas 32nd in population (2000)
47	1921	Rob Portman	Republican	Ohio	January 3, 2011	Former member of the U.S. House of Representatives (12 years)
48	1922	John Boozman	Republican	Arkansas	January 3, 2011	Former member of the U.S. House of Representatives (9 years)
49	1923	Pat Toomey	Republican	Pennsylvania	January 3, 2011	Former member of the U.S. House of Representatives (6 years)
50	1924	John Hoeven	Republican	North Dakota	January 3, 2011	Former governor
51	1925	Marco Rubio	Republican	Florida	January 3, 2011	Florida 4th in population (2000)
52	1926	Ron Johnson	Republican	Wisconsin	January 3, 2011	Wisconsin 18th in population (2000)
53	1927	Rand Paul	Republican	Kentucky	January 3, 2011	Kentucky 25th in population (2000)
54	1928	Richard Blumenthal	Democratic	Connecticut	January 3, 2011	Connecticut 29th in population (2000)
55	1929	Mike Lee	Republican	Utah	January 3, 2011	Utah 34th in population (2000)
56	1932	Brian Schatz	Democratic	Hawaii	December 27, 2012	
57	1933	Tim Scott	Republican	South Carolina	January 2, 2013	
58	1934	Tammy Baldwin	Democratic	Wisconsin	January 3, 2013	Former member of the U.S. House of Representatives (14 years)
59	1937	Chris Murphy	Democratic	Connecticut	January 3, 2013	Former member of the U.S. House of Representatives (6 years); Connecticut 29th in population (2010)
60	1938	Mazie Hirono	Democratic	Hawaii	January 3, 2013	Former member of the U.S. House of Representatives (6 years); Hawaii 42nd in population (2010)
61	1939	Martin Heinrich	Democratic	New Mexico	January 3, 2013	Former member of the U.S. House of Representatives (4 years)
62	1940	Angus King	Independent	Maine	January 3, 2013	Former governor (8 years)
63	1941	Tim Kaine	Democratic	Virginia	January 3, 2013	Former governor (4 years)
64	1942	Ted Cruz	Republican	Texas	January 3, 2013	Texas 2nd in population (2010)
65	1943	Elizabeth Warren	Democratic	Massachusetts	January 3, 2013	Massachusetts 15th in population (2010)
66	1944	Deb Fischer	Republican	Nebraska	January 3, 2013	Nebraska 38th in population (2010)
67	1948	Ed Markey	Democratic	Massachusetts	July 16, 2013	
68	1949	Cory Booker	Democratic	New Jersey	October 31, 2013	
69	1951	Shelley Moore Capito	Republican	West Virginia	January 3, 2015	Former member of the U.S. House of Representatives (14 years)
70	1952	Gary Peters	Democratic	Michigan	January 3, 2015	Former member of the U.S. House of Representatives (6 years); Michigan 9th in population (2010)
71	1953	Bill Cassidy	Republican	Louisiana	January 3, 2015	Former member of the U.S. House of Representatives (6 years); Louisiana 25th in population (2010)
72	1954	Cory Gardner	Republican	Colorado	January 3, 2015	Former member of the U.S. House of Representatives (4 years); Colorado 22nd in population (2010)
73	1955	James Lankford	Republican	Oklahoma	January 3, 2015	Former member of the U.S. House of Representatives (4 years); Oklahoma 28th in population (2010)
74	1956	Tom Cotton	Republican	Arkansas	January 3, 2015	Former member of the U.S. House of Representatives (2 years); Arkansas 32nd in population (2010)
75	1957	Steve Daines	Republican	Montana	January 3, 2015	Former member of the U.S. House of Representatives (2 years); Montana 44th in population (2010)
76	1958	Mike Rounds	Republican	South Dakota	January 3, 2015	Former governor
77	1959	David Perdue	Republican	Georgia	January 3, 2015	Georgia 8th in population (2010)
78	1960	Thom Tillis	Republican	North Carolina	January 3, 2015	North Carolina 10th in population (2010)
79	1961	Joni Ernst	Republican	Iowa	January 3, 2015	Iowa 30th in population (2010)
80	1962	Ben Sasse	Republican	Nebraska	January 3, 2015	Nebraska 38th in population (2010)
81	1963	Dan Sullivan	Republican	Alaska	January 3, 2015	Alaska 47th in population (2010)
82	1964	Chris Van Hollen	Democratic	Maryland	January 3, 2017	Former member of the U.S. House of Representatives (14 years)
83	1965	Todd Young	Republican	Indiana	January 3, 2017	Former member of the U.S. House of Representatives (6 years)
84	1966	Tammy Duckworth	Democratic	Illinois	January 3, 2017	Former member of the U.S. House of Representatives (4 years)
85	1967	Maggie Hassan	Democratic	New Hampshire	January 3, 2017	Former governor
86	1968	Kamala Harris	Democratic	California	January 3, 2017	California 1st in population (2010)
87	1969	John Neely Kennedy	Republican	Louisiana	January 3, 2017	Louisiana 25th in population (2010)
88	1970	Catherine Cortez Masto	Democratic	Nevada	January 3, 2017	Nevada 35th in population (2010)
89	1972	Tina Smith	Democratic	Minnesota	January 3, 2018	Minnesota 21st in population (2010)
90	1973	Doug Jones	Democratic	Alabama	January 3, 2018	Alabama 23rd in population (2010)
91	1974	Cindy Hyde-Smith	Republican	Mississippi	April 2, 2018	
92	1975	Marsha Blackburn	Republican	Tennessee	January 3, 2019	Former member of the U.S. House of Representatives (16 years)
93	1976	Kyrsten Sinema	Democratic	Arizona	January 3, 2019	Former member of the U.S. House of Representatives (6 years); Arizona 16th in population (2010)
94	1977	Kevin Cramer	Republican	North Dakota	January 3, 2019	Former member of the U.S. House of Representatives (6 years); North Dakota 48th in population (2010)
95	1978	Martha McSally (Note: In Arizona, John McCain (R) had died August 25, 2018 from the previous Congress. Governor Doug Ducey appointed former U.S. Senator Jon Kyl (R) as McCain's replacement on September 4, 2018, but Kyl only agreed to serve until December 31, 2018. In the regular November 2018 election to replace Jeff Flake (R), who had declined to run for reelection, Martha McSally (R) lost to Kyrsten Sinema (D), but was instead appointed by Governor Ducey to replace Kyl at the start of this Congress. Sinema and McSally were sworn in on the same day. In the 2020 special election required by Arizona law to finish McCain's term, McSally lost to Mark Kelly (D), who was sworn in as her replacement on December 2, 2020.)	Republican	Arizona	January 3, 2019	Former member of the U.S. House of Representatives (4 years)
96	1979	Jacky Rosen	Democratic	Nevada	January 3, 2019	Former member of the U.S. House of Representatives (2 years)
97	1980	Mitt Romney	Republican	Utah	January 3, 2019	Former governor
98	1981	Mike Braun	Republican	Indiana	January 3, 2019	Indiana 15th in population (2010)
99	1982	Josh Hawley	Republican	Missouri	January 3, 2019	Missouri 18th in population (2010)
100	1983	Rick Scott (Note: In Florida, Gov. Rick Scott (R) delayed his US Senate swearing-in.)	Republican	Florida	January 8, 2019	
	1984	Kelly Loeffler	Republican	Georgia	January 6, 2020	
	1985	Mark Kelly	Democratic	Arizona	December 2, 2020	

The most senior senators by class were Dianne Feinstein (D-California) from Class 1, Mitch McConnell (R-Kentucky) from Class 2, and Patrick Leahy (D-Vermont) from Class 3.

== See also ==
- Seniority in the United States Senate
- 116th United States Congress
- List of United States representatives in the 116th Congress
