= Kelvin Butler =

American politician from Mississippi (born 1956)

Kelvin E. Butler

Member of the Mississippi Senate from the 38th district
- In office 2021–2024
- Preceded by: Tammy Witherspoon
- Succeeded by: Gary Brumfield
- In office 2004–2016
- Preceded by: Robert Johnson III
- Succeeded by: Tammy Witherspoon

Personal details
- Born: April 8, 1956 (age 70) Magnolia, Mississippi, U.S.
- Party: Democratic (before 2023); Independent (2023–present)
- Education: Meadows Draughon Business College
- Occupation: Businessman

Kelvin E. Butler (born April 8, 1956) is an American politician who served as a member of the Mississippi Senate, representing the 38th district.

== Early life and career ==
Kelvin Butler was born on August 8, 1956, in Magnolia, Mississippi. He received his associate's degree at the now-defunct Meadows Draughon Business College in New Orleans in 1975.

In 1999, Butler was an unsuccessful candidate for the Mississippi House of Representatives from District 98. Butler first served in the Mississippi Senate from District 38 from 2004 to 2016. He regained his former seat when he won a special election in 2021 to replace Tammy Witherspoon. Prior to his time as a State Senator, he had served as an alderman of the City of Magnolia.

While Butler was elected as a Democrat, he filed for re-election in 2023 as an independent but lost the general election to Democrat Gary Brumfield.

=== Organizations ===
Butler has been a member of the following organizations:

- Vice President, Operation Manhood Incorporated, 1999–present
- Member, Magnolia South Pike Chamber of Commerce, 1995–present
- Deacon, New Zion Baptist Church, 1994–present
- Member, Masonic Lodge #234, 1990–present
- Member, International Union of Electrical Workers, 1984–present
- Coach, Dixie Youth Baseball, 1998–1999

== Personal ==
Butler is a Baptist. He is widowed and he has three children named Kelvin Jr., Kendric, and Destiny.
