= Jason Barrett (Mississippi politician) =

American politician

Member of the Mississippi State Senate from the 39th district
- Incumbent
- Assumed office October 28, 2020
- Preceded by: Sally Doty

Personal details
- Born: Jason Todd Barrett; March 19, 1978 (age 48) Thomasville, Georgia, U.S.
- Party: Republican
- Children: 2
- Education: University of Georgia; Mississippi College School of Law
- Occupation: Attorney

Jason Todd Barrett (born March 19, 1978) is an American politician, serving in the Mississippi State Senate from the 39th district since 2020.

== Early life and education ==
Barrett was born in Thomasville, Georgia, where he attended Thomas County Central High School. He graduated from the University of Georgia in 2000 and received his J.D. degree from Mississippi College School of Law in 2007. He was admitted to the Mississippi State Bar shortly after in October 2007.

== Career ==
Barrett served as a teacher and coach before becoming an attorney with his own practice, Barrett Law Firm located in Brookhaven, Mississippi, which is where he resides.

When former State Senator Sally Doty resigned due to an appointment by Governor Tate Reeves, Barrett ran for special election to the seat against main contender Bill Sones Sr., along with seven other minor candidates. The two went to a runoff, after Barrett secured 20.1% of the vote and Sones received 31.5% of the vote. In the general election, Barrett won with approximately 57% of the vote. Barrett assumed office on October 28, 2020, and is a Republican.

== Political positions ==
Barrett campaigned on how he was a "conservative Republican who will protect your constitutional rights and support fully funding public education" as well as how he was anti-abortion. Further, he stated his support for "accessible, affordable health care" and on helping rural hospitals.

== Personal life ==
Barrett is married with two children and is of Baptist faith.
