= Elections in Mississippi =

Elections are held every year in the US state of Mississippi.

US presidential elections are held every 4 years, most recently in 2024. Elections to the House of Representatives are every 2 years, most recently in 2026. Gubernatorial elections are held every 4 years, most recently in 2023, together with general elections for all members of the state legislature. The two US senate seats are elected for overlapping 6 year terms. The Class 1 senate seat was most recently contested in 2024, the Class 2 senate seat was contested in 2026.

In a 2020 study, Mississippi was ranked as the 4th hardest state for citizens to vote in.

Following the passage of a 2020 ballot measure if a candidate in a general election for a statewide seat (except for US Senate elections) fails to receive a majority of the vote in the general election a runoff election is held.

== Elections since 2000 ==
=== 2000 ===
- United States presidential election
- United States Senate election
- United States House of Representatives elections

=== 2002 ===
- United States Senate election
- United States House of Representatives elections

=== 2003 ===
- General election
- Gubernatorial election

=== 2004 ===
- United States presidential election
- United States House of Representatives elections

=== 2006 ===
- United States House of Representatives elections
- United States Senate election

=== 2007 ===
- Primary election
- General election
- Gubernatorial election

=== 2008 ===
- United States presidential election
- Democratic primary
- Republican primary
- 1st congressional district special election
- United States House of Representatives elections
- United States Senate election
- United States Senate special election

=== 2010 ===
- United States House of Representatives elections

=== 2011 ===
- Gubernatorial election

=== 2012 ===
- United States presidential election
- United States Senate election
- United States House of Representatives elections

=== 2014 ===
- United States House of Representatives elections
- United States Senate election

=== 2015 ===
- 1st congressional district special election
- Gubernatorial election

=== 2016 ===
- United States presidential election
- United States House of Representatives elections

=== 2018 ===
- United States Senate election
- United States Senate special election
- United States House of Representatives elections

=== 2019 ===
- Gubernatorial election

=== 2020 ===
- United States presidential election
- United States Senate election
- Democratic primary
- United States House of Representatives elections

=== 2022 ===
- United States House of Representatives elections

=== 2023 ===
- Gubernatorial election

=== 2024 ===
- United States Senate election
- United States House of Representatives elections

=== 2026 ===
- United States Senate election
- United States House of Representatives elections

=== 2027 ===
- Gubernatorial election

== See also ==
- Political party strength in Mississippi
- United States presidential elections in Mississippi
