= Green Party of Mississippi =

- Founded: 2002
- Ideology: Green politics
- Political position: Left-wing
- National affiliation: Green Party of the United States
- Colors: Green

The Green Party of Mississippi is a state political party in Mississippi, United States. It is the Mississippi affiliate of the Green Party of the United States. The Green Party was officially recognized by the state government in April 2002 and granted ballot access.

== History ==
=== Origins ===
In the lead-up to the 2000 United States presidential election, numerous groups across the state of Mississippi formed in support of the candidate from the Green Party, Ralph Nader. In December 1999, the first such group appeared in the town of Oxford, with more appearing the following year along the Mississippi Gulf Coast and in Cleveland, DeSoto County, Hattiesburg, Jackson, Starkville, and Tupelo. The state office for Nader estimated the total number of volunteers in Mississippi to be 235. Nader received over 8,000 votes from Mississippians.

Volunteers for Nader, particularly from the Gulf Coast's "Gulf Coast for Nader" organization, announced their intention to formally seek the formation of a Mississippi Green Party, recognized by the Secretary of State. In order to run candidates under a state party name, the organization had to form an executive committee with officers and members from each of Mississippi's congressional districts, among other requirements.

=== Foundation and early history ===
On April 22, 2002, the Green Party of Mississippi announced that it had registered as an official political party. Upon recognition, the party gained state press attention for its opposition to the state's usage of capital punishment and the Iraq War.

During the 2003 Mississippi elections, the party ran one candidate: Sherman Lee Dillon, a local folk musician, for governor. The first Green to hold office in Mississippi was elected on November 8, 2004, when John M. Wages Jr. ran unopposed for election commissioner in the third supervisor district of Lee County.

During the 2007 Mississippi elections, the party faced scrutiny when Governor Haley Barbour, Attorney General Jim Hood, and Secretary of State Eric Clark called for the removal of Melvin Brown, a Green Party candidate for the Mississippi House of Representatives, after the party did not submit Brown's letter of intent. Brown remained on the ballot for the general election, however.

=== Recent years ===
In 2011, the party campaigned at the Mississippi State Capitol in support of net metering, a mechanism which gives homeowners who produce renewable energy credit for the electricity they produce. Campaigners said that Mississippi had fallen behind other states on this policy.

In October 2016, Green Party presidential candidate Jill Stein visited Oxford at an event sponsored by the state chapter.

== Presidential election results ==
Year	Nominee	Votes	%
1996	Ralph Nader	Not on ballot	0.00%
2000	Ralph Nader	8,126	0.80%
2004	David Cobb	1,073	0.10%
2008	Cynthia McKinney	1,034	0.08%
2012	Jill Stein	1,588	0.12%
2016	Jill Stein	3,731	0.31%
2020	Howie Hawkins	1,498	0.11%
