= 2007 Mississippi elections =

A general election was held in Mississippi on November 6, 2007, to elect to four-year terms for all members of the Mississippi State Legislature (122 representatives, 52 senators), the offices of Governor of Mississippi, Lieutenant Governor, Secretary of State, Attorney General, State Auditor, State Treasurer, Commissioner of Agriculture and Commerce, and Commissioner of Insurance, plus all three members of the Mississippi Transportation Commission and Mississippi Public Service Commission.

The election was generally a success for Republicans, as they held all their statewide elected offices, and won the open Secretary of State and Insurance Commissioner seats, leaving Attorney General Jim Hood the only statewide elected Democratic officeholder. However, Democrats regained control of the State Senate and maintained their majority in the House of Representatives, won a 2-1 majority on the Public Service Commission, and held their 2-1 majority on the Transportation Commission.

== Mississippi State Legislature ==
All 122 representatives and 52 senators of the Mississippi State Legislature are elected for four-year terms with no staggering of terms. The state legislature draws up separate district maps for the Mississippi House of Representatives and the Mississippi Senate, usually after the federal U.S. Census. There are no term limits for members of both houses of the legislature.

=== Results for the Mississippi Senate ===
Party	Votes	Seats	Loss/gain	Share of vote (%)
Democratic	171,993	28	+3	
Republican	161,042	24	-3	
Constitution	10,881	0	0	
Independent	3,818	0	0	
Total	347,734	52	0	100.0%

=== Results for House of Representatives ===
Party	Votes	Seats	Loss/gain	Share of vote (%)
Democratic		75	0	
Republican		47	0	
Constitution		0	0	
Independent		0	0	
Total		122	0	

== Statewide officer elections ==
According to the state constitution, a statewide officer must win both the majority of electoral votes and the majority of the popular vote to be elected.

The number of electoral votes equals the number of Mississippi House of Representatives districts, currently set at 122. A plurality of votes in each House District is required to win the electoral vote for that District. In the event of a tie between the two candidates with the highest votes, the electoral vote is split between them.

In the event an officeholder does not win both the majority electoral and majority popular vote, the House of Representatives shall choose the winner. The Democrats held a large edge (73–46 with three vacancies) in the House, thus ensuring that any contested race would go to the Democratic candidate.

== Governor ==
Mississippi Gubernatorial election, 2007
- November 6, 2007
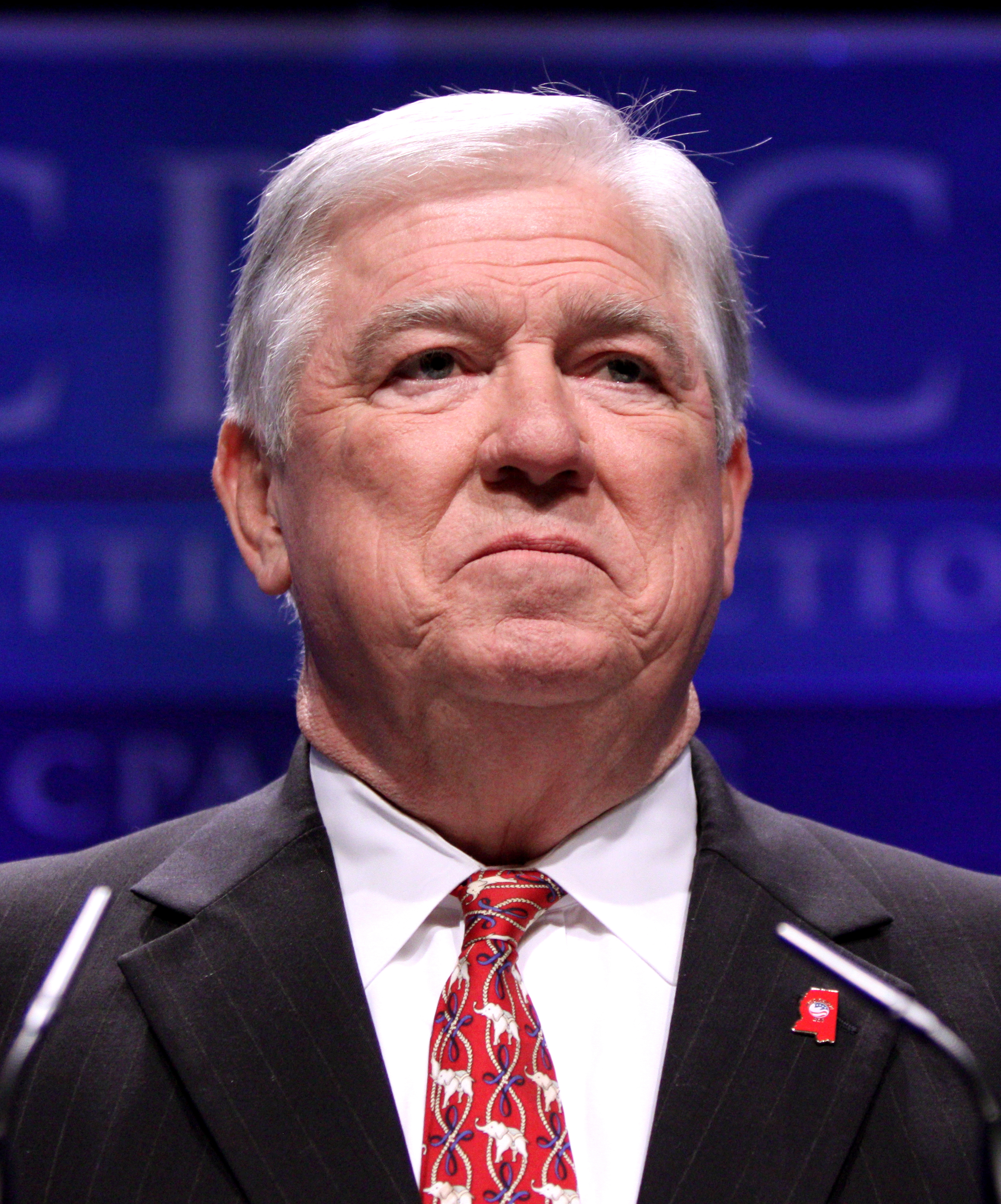

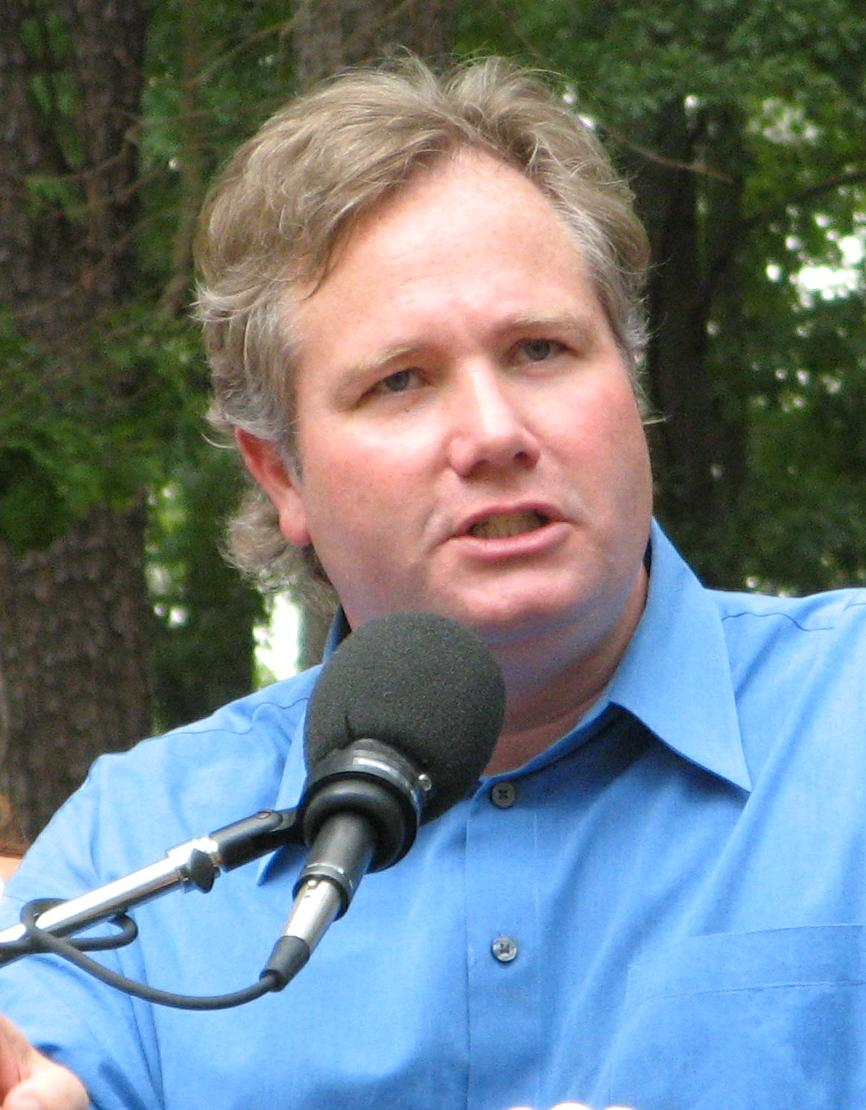
Nominee	Haley Barbour	John Arthur Eaves Jr.
Party	Republican	Democratic
Electoral vote	78	44
Popular vote	430,807	313,232
Percentage	57.90%	42.10%
- County results Barbour: 50–60% 60–70% 70–80% Eaves: 50–60% 60–70% 70–80%
Governor before election
Haley Barbour
Republican
Elected Governor
Haley Barbour
Republican

=== Democratic primary ===
==== Candidates ====
- William Compton, Jr.
- John Arthur Eaves, Jr.
- Louis Fondren
- Fred T. Smith

==== Results ====
Democratic primary results
Party	Candidate	Votes	%
Democratic	John Arthur Eaves, Jr.	314,012	70.3
Democratic	William Compton	52,343	11.7
Democratic	Fred Smith	49,170	11.0
Democratic	Louis Fondren	31,197	7.0
Total votes		446,722	100

=== Republican primary ===
==== Candidates ====
- Haley Barbour, incumbent
- Frederick Jones

==== Results ====
Republican primary results
Party	Candidate	Votes	%
Republican	Haley Barbour (incumbent)	184,036	93.1
Republican	Frederick Jones	13,611	6.9
Total votes		197,647	100

=== General election ===
==== Results ====
2007 Mississippi Governor election
Party	Candidate	Votes	%
Republican	Haley Barbour	430,807	57.9
Democratic	John Arthur Eaves Jr.	313,232	42.1
Total votes		744,039	100.0

== Lieutenant governor ==
Mississippi Lieutenant Gubernatorial election, 2007
- November 6, 2007
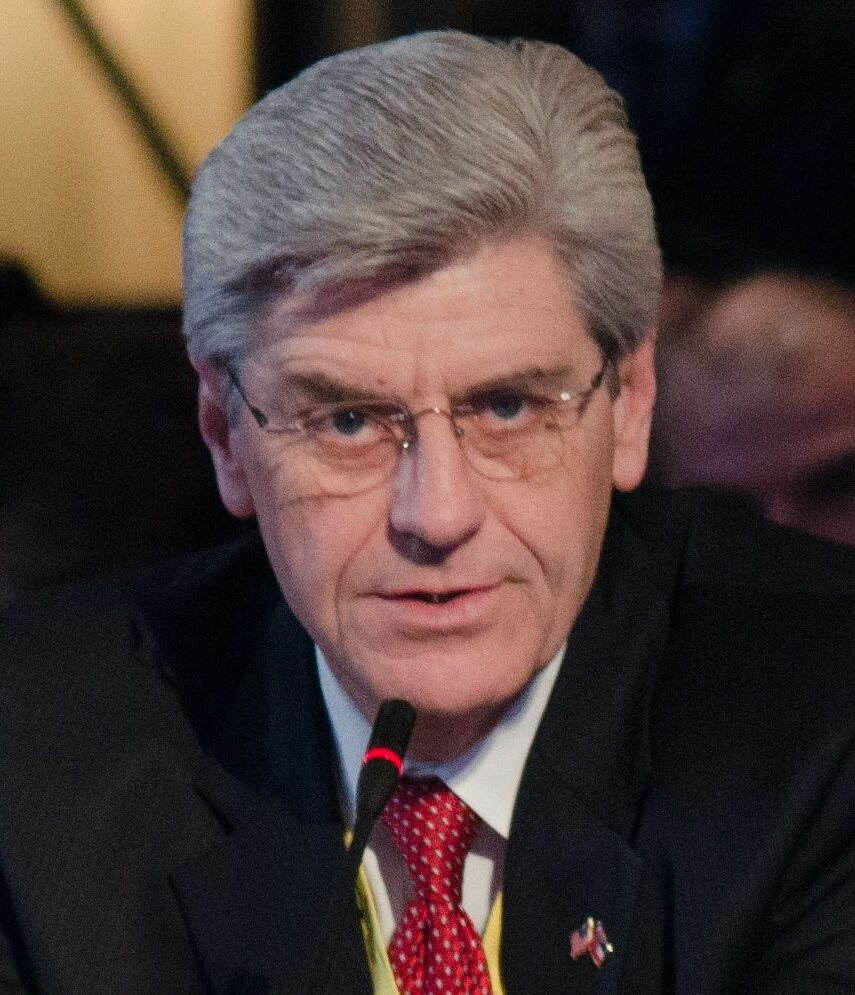

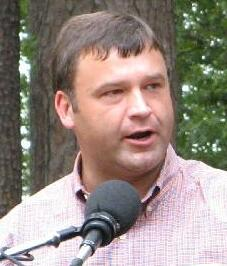
Nominee	Phil Bryant	Jamie Franks
Party	Republican	Democratic
Popular vote	432,152	305,409
Percentage	58.6%	41.4%
- County results Bryant: 50–60% 60–70% 70–80% 80–90% Franks: 50–60% 60–70% 70–80%
Lieutenant Governor before election
Amy Tuck
Republican
Elected Lieutenant Governor
Phil Bryant
Republican

=== Democratic nomination ===
==== Candidates ====
- Jamie Franks

==== Results ====
Democratic primary results
Party	Candidate	Votes	%
Democratic	Jamie Franks	288,942	100
Total votes		288,942	100.0

=== Republican primary ===
==== Candidates ====
- Phil Bryant, State Auditor
- Charlie Ross, state senator

==== Results ====
Republican primary results
Party	Candidate	Votes	%
Republican	Phil Bryant	112,140	57.3
Republican	Charlie Ross	83,660	42.7
Total votes		195,800	100.0

=== General election ===
==== Results ====
2007 Mississippi Lieutenant Governor election
Party	Candidate	Votes	%
Republican	Phil Bryant	432,152	58.6
Democratic	Jamie Franks	305,409	41.4
Total votes		737,561	100.0

== Secretary of State ==
Mississippi Secretary of State election, 2007
- November 6, 2007
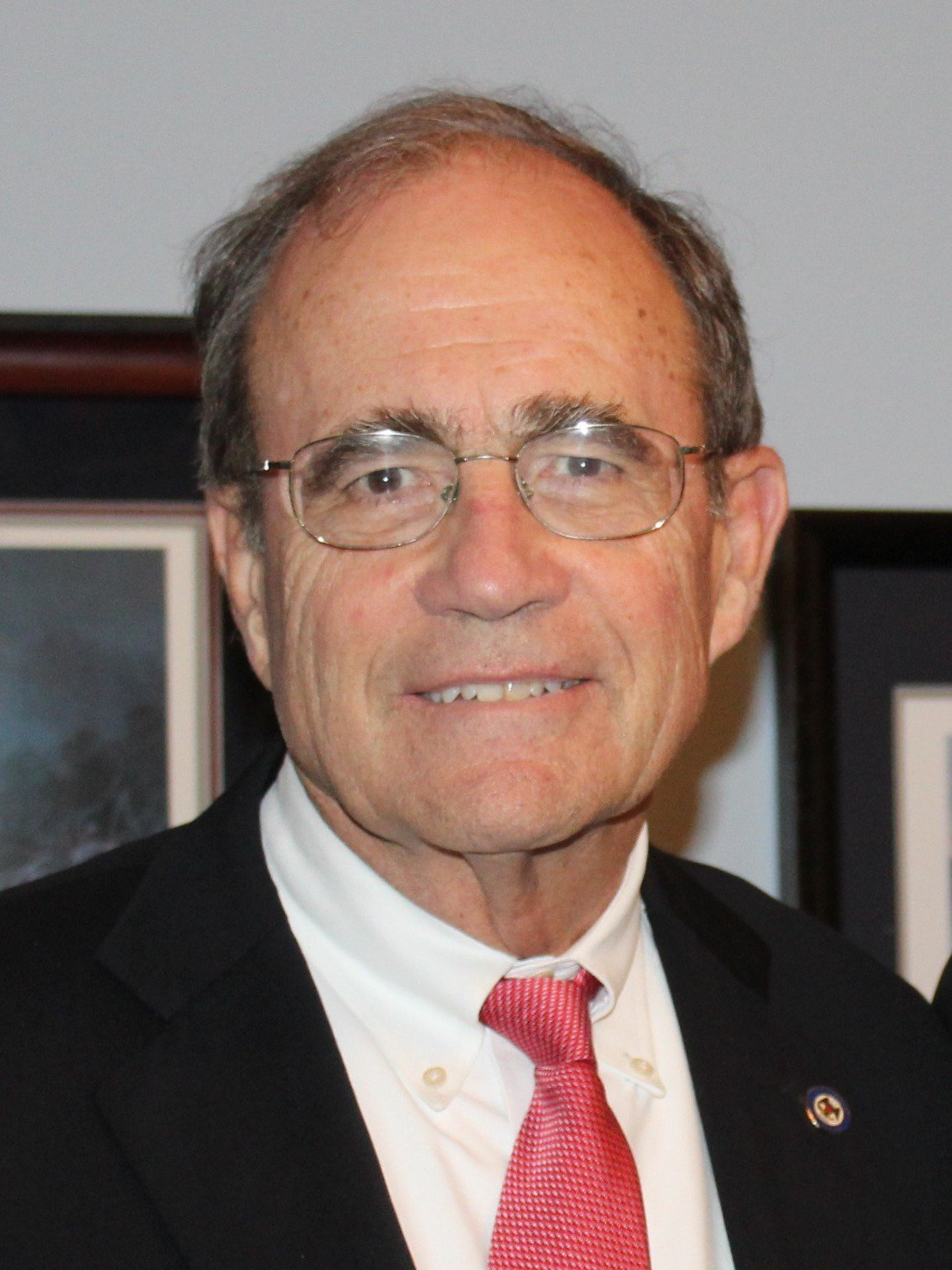

Nominee	Delbert Hosemann	Robert Smith
Party	Republican	Democratic
Popular vote	425,228	304,917
Percentage	58.2%	41.8%
- County results Hosemann: 50–60% 60–70% 70–80% 80–90% Smith: 50–60% 60–70% 70–80% 80–90%
Secretary of State before election
Eric Clark
Democratic
Elected Secretary of State
Delbert Hosemann
Republican

=== Democratic primary ===
==== Candidates ====
- Robert H. Smith
- Jabari A. Toins
- John Windsor

==== Results ====
Democratic primary results
Party	Candidate	Votes	%
Democratic	Robert H. Smith	307,991	72.2
Democratic	John O. Windsor	81,464	19.2
Democratic	Jabari A. Toins	34,409	8.1
Total votes		423,864	100.0

=== Republican primary ===
==== Candidates ====
- Delbert Hosemann, lawyer
- Mike Lott, state representative
- Jeffrey Rupp
- Gene Sills

==== Results ====
Republican primary results
Party	Candidate	Votes	%
Republican	Delbert Hosemann	102,093	53.8
Republican	Mike Lott	64,879	34.2
Republican	Jeffrey Rupp	17,838	9.4
Republican	Gene Sills	4,982	2.6
Total votes		189,792	100.0

=== General election ===
==== Results ====
2007 Mississippi Secretary of State election
Party	Candidate	Votes	%
Republican	Delbert Hosemann	425,228	58.2
Democratic	Robert Smith	304,917	41.8
Total votes		730,145	100.0

== Attorney general ==
Mississippi Attorney General election, 2007
- November 6, 2007
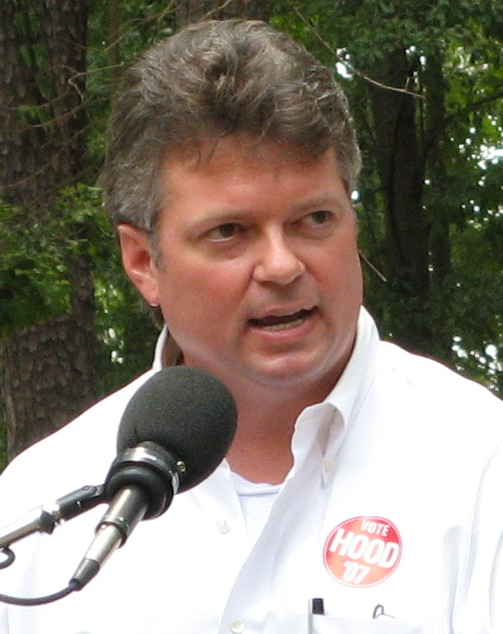

Nominee	Jim Hood	Al Hopkins
Party	Democratic	Republican
Popular vote	439,668	295,791
Percentage	59.8%	40.2%
- County results: Hood: 50–60% 60–70% 70–80% 80–90% Hopkins: 50–60% 60–70%
Attorney General before election
Jim Hood
Democratic
Elected Attorney General
Jim Hood
Democratic

=== Democratic nomination ===
==== Candidate ====
- Jim Hood, the incumbent Democratic Attorney General, ran unopposed.

==== Results ====
Democratic primary results
Party	Candidate	Votes	%
Democratic	Jim Hood	316,781	100
Total votes		316,781	100.0

=== Republican nomination ===
==== Candidate ====
- Al Hopkins, the Republican candidate, ran unopposed.

==== Results ====
Republican primary results
Party	Candidate	Votes	%
Republican	Al Hopkins	132,910	100
Total votes		132,910	100.0

=== General election ===
==== Results ====
2007 Mississippi Attorney General election
Party	Candidate	Votes	%
Democratic	Jim Hood (incumbent)	439,668	59.8
Republican	Al Hopkins	295,791	40.2
Total votes		735,459	100.0

== State Auditor ==
Mississippi State Auditor election, 2007
- November 6, 2007
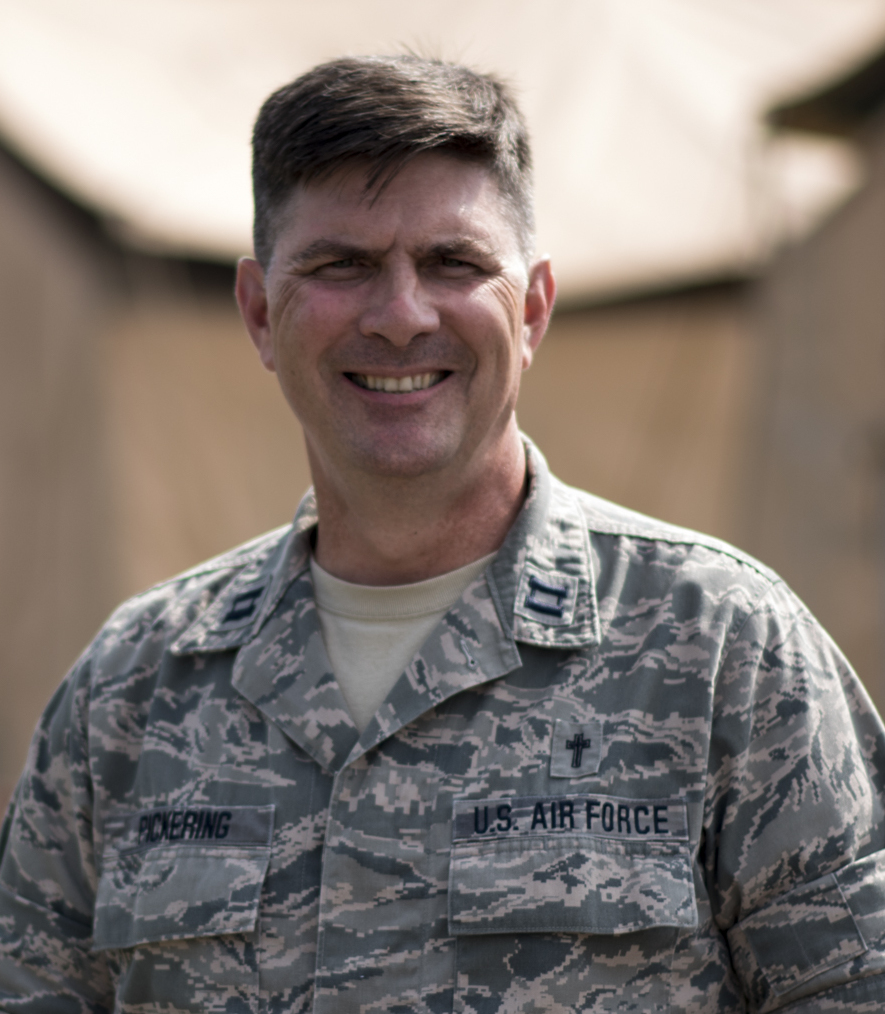

Nominee	Stacey Pickering	Mike Sumrall
Party	Republican	Democratic
Popular vote	399,721	327,033
Percentage	55.0%	45.0%
- County results Pickering: 50–60% 60–70% 70–80% Sumrall: 50–60% 60–70% 70–80% 80–90%
State Auditor before election
Phil Bryant
Republican
Elected State Auditor
Stacey Pickering
Republican

=== Democratic primary ===
==== Candidates ====
- Todd Brand
- Jacob Ray
- Mike Sumrall

==== Results ====
Democratic primary results
Party	Candidate	Votes	%
Democratic	Mike Sumrall	196,108	46.6
Democratic	Todd Brand	152,246	36.2
Democratic	Jacob Ray	72,404	17.2
Total votes		420,758	100.0

==== Runoff ====
Democratic primary runoff results
Party	Candidate	Votes	%
Democratic	Mike Sumrall	164,980	52.9
Democratic	Todd Brand	146,807	47.1
Total votes		311,787	100.0

=== Republican nomination ===
==== Candidate ====
- Stacey Pickering

==== Results ====
Republican primary results
Party	Candidate	Votes	%
Republican	Stacey Pickering	129,561	100
Total votes		129,561	100.0

=== General election ===
==== Results ====
2007 Mississippi State Auditor election
Party	Candidate	Votes	%
Republican	Stacey Pickering	399,721	55.0
Democratic	Mike Sumrall	327,033	45.0
Total votes		726,754	100.0

== State Treasurer ==
Mississippi State Treasurer election, 2007
- November 6, 2007
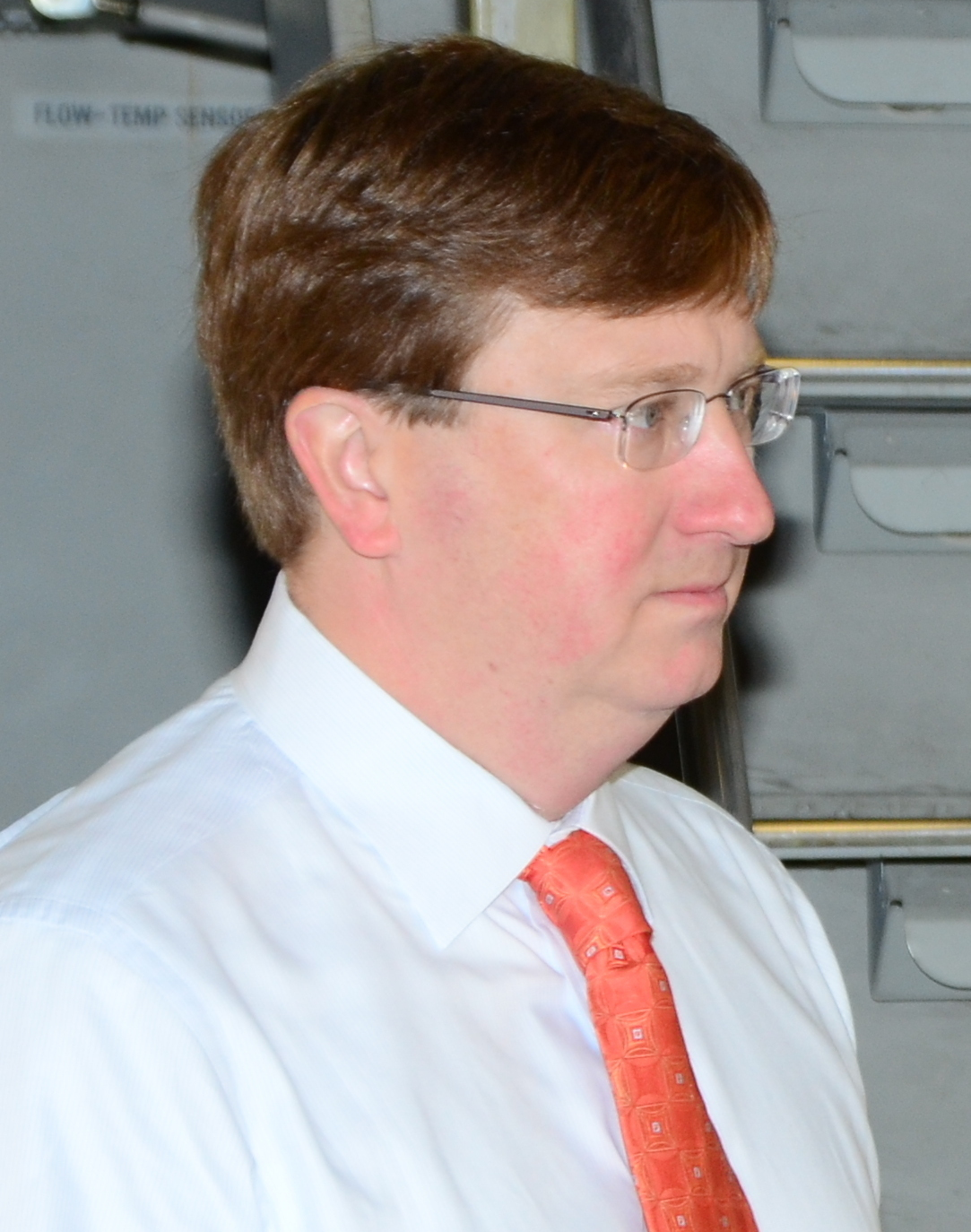

Nominee	Tate Reeves	Shawn O'Hara
Party	Republican	Democratic
Popular vote	436,833	284,789
Percentage	60.5%	39.5%
- County results Reeves: 50–60% 60–70% 70–80% 80–90% O'Hara: 50–60% 60–70% 70–80%
State Treasurer before election
Tate Reeves
Republican
Elected State Treasurer
Tate Reeves
Republican

=== Democratic nomination ===
==== Candidate ====
- Shawn O'Hara

==== Results ====
Democratic primary results
Party	Candidate	Votes	%
Democratic	Shawn O'Hara	278,819	100
Total votes		278,819	100.0

=== Republican nomination ===
==== Candidate ====
- Tate Reeves, incumbent

==== Results ====
Republican primary results
Party	Candidate	Votes	%
Republican	Tate Reeves	136,145	100
Total votes		136,145	100.0

=== General election ===
==== Results ====
2007 Mississippi State Treasurer election
Party	Candidate	Votes	%
Republican	Tate Reeves (incumbent)	436,833	60.5
Democratic	Shawn O'Hara	284,789	39.5
Total votes		721,622	100.0

== Commissioner of Agriculture and Commerce ==
Mississippi Commissioner of Agriculture and Commerce election, 2007
- November 6, 2007

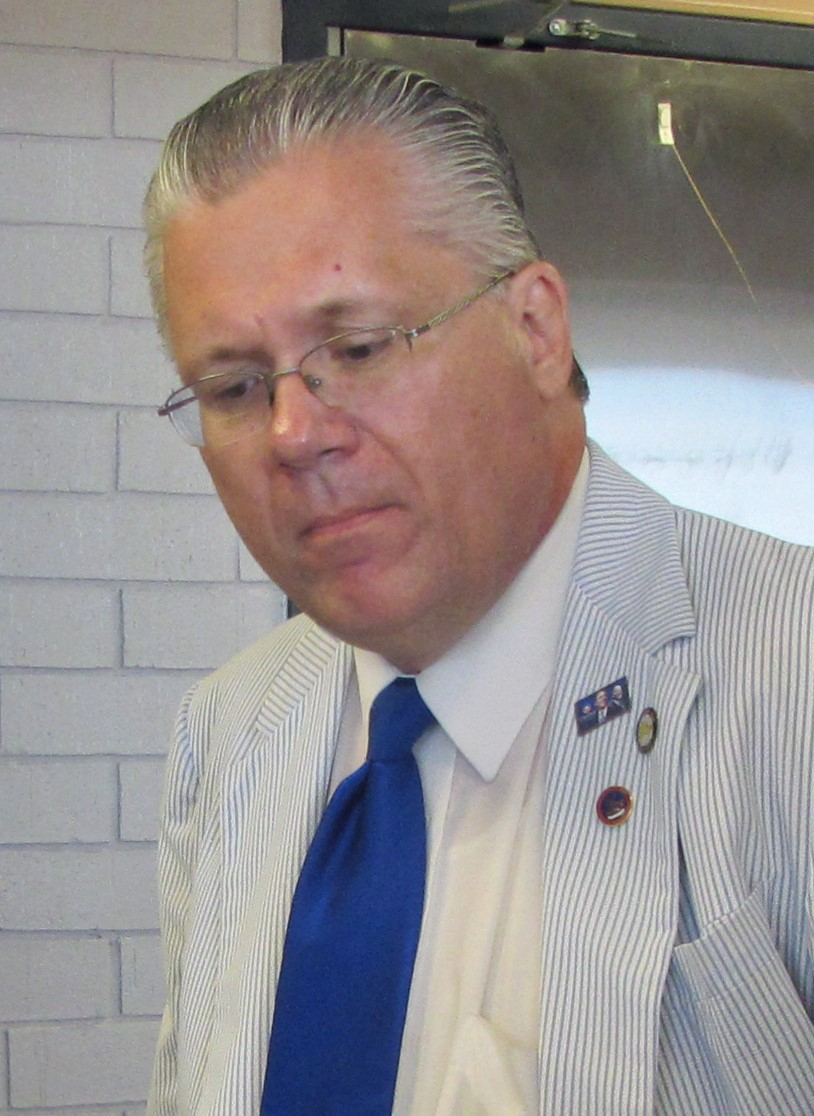
Nominee	Lester Spell	Ricky Cole
Party	Republican	Democratic
Popular vote	371,191	308,693
Percentage	51.0%	42.4%
- County results Spell: 40–50% 50–60% 60–70% Cole: 40–50% 50–60% 60–70% 70–80%
Commissioner of Agriculture and Commerce before election
Lester Spell
Republican
Elected Commissioner of Agriculture and Commerce
Lester Spell
Republican

Lester Spell was elected as a Democrat in 2003, but changed his party affiliation to Republican ahead of the 2007 elections.

=== Democratic nomination ===
==== Candidate ====
- Rickey Cole

==== Results ====
Democratic primary results
Party	Candidate	Votes	%
Democratic	Rickey Cole	284,923	100
Total votes		284,923	100.0

=== Republican primary ===
==== Candidate ====
- Max Phillips
- Lester Spell, incumbent

==== Results ====
Republican primary results
Party	Candidate	Votes	%
Republican	Lester Spell	102,422	54.5
Republican	Max Phillips	85,478	45.5
Total votes		187,900	100.0

=== General election ===
==== Results ====
2007 Mississippi Commissioner of Agriculture and Commerce election
Party	Candidate	Votes	%
Republican	Lester Spell (incumbent)	371,191	51.0
Democratic	Ricky Cole	308,693	42.4
Constitution	Paul Riley	47,647	6.6
Total votes		727,531	100.0

== Commissioner of Insurance ==
Mississippi Commissioner of Insurance election, 2007
- November 6, 2007
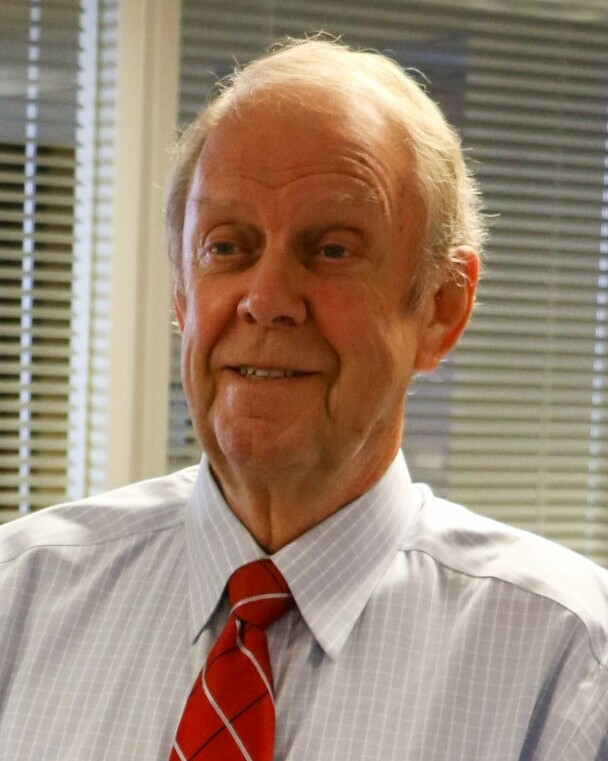

Nominee	Mike Chaney	Gary Anderson
Party	Republican	Democratic
Popular vote	415,242	319,287
Percentage	56.5%	43.5%
- County results Chaney: 50–60% 60–70% 70–80% Anderson: 50–60% 60–70% 70–80% 80–90%
Commissioner of Insurance before election
George Dale
Democratic
Elected Commissioner of Insurance
Mike Chaney
Republican

=== Democratic primary ===
==== Candidates ====
- Gary Anderson
- George Dale

==== Results ====
Democratic primary results
Party	Candidate	Votes	%
Democratic	Gary Anderson	242,941	51.3%
Democratic	George Dale	230,782	48.7
Total votes		473,723	100.0

=== Republican primary ===
==== Candidates ====
- Mike Chaney, state senator
- Ronnie D. English

==== Results ====
Republican primary results
Party	Candidate	Votes	%
Republican	Mike Chaney	137,685	79.0
Republican	Ronnie D. English	36,646	21.0
Total votes		174,331	100.0

=== General election ===
==== Results ====
2007 Mississippi Commissioner of Insurance election
Party	Candidate	Votes	%
Republican	Mike Chaney	415,242	56.5
Democratic	Gary Anderson	319,287	43.5
Total votes		734,529	100.0

== Public Service Commission ==
Mississippi Public Service Commissioner, Northern District election, 2007
- November 6, 2007
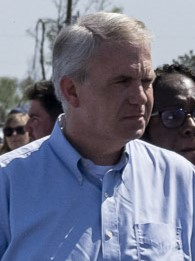

Nominee	Brandon Presley	Mabel Murphree
Party	Democratic	Republican
Popular vote	134,405	97,892
Percentage	51.9%	42.1
- County results Presley: 50–60% 60–70% 70–80% Murphree: 50–60% 60–70%
Northern District Commissioner before election
Bo Robinson
Democratic
Elected Northern District Commissioner
Brandon Presley
Democratic

=== Northern District ===
Incumbent Democrat Bo Robinson, a member of the commission since 1989, decided against running for another term.

==== Candidates ====
- Brandon Presley, mayor of Nettleton, Mississippi
- Michael F. Parker
- Rick Clifton

==== Results ====
Democratic primary results
Party	Candidate	Votes	%
Democratic	Brandon Presley	92,885	51.9
Democratic	Michael F. Parker	55,681	31.1
Democratic	Rick Clifton	30,444	17.0
Total votes		179,010	100.0

==== Candidates ====
- Mabel Murphree

==== Results ====
2007 Mississippi Public Service Commissioner, Northern District election
Party	Candidate	Votes	%
Democratic	Brandon Presley	134,405	57.9
Republican	Mabel Murphree	97,892	42.1
Total votes		232,297	100.0

Mississippi Public Service Commissioner, Central District election, 2007
- November 6, 2007

Nominee	Lynn Posey	Charles Barbour	Lee Dilworth
Party	Democratic	Republican	Reform
Popular vote	122,417	112,782	6,833
Percentage	50.6%	46.6%	2.8%
- County results Posey: 50–60% 60–70% 70–80% 80–90% >90% Barbour: 50–60% 60–70%
Central District Commissioner before election
Nielsen Cochran
Republican
Elected Central District Commissioner
Lynn Posey
Democratic

=== Central District ===
Incumbent Republican Nielsen Cochran, a member of the commission since 1983, decided against running for reelection.

==== Candidates ====
- Addie Green, union leader for IUE Local 698 Union in Clinton, Mississippi
- Lynn Posey, state senator from Union Church
- John C. Rush, Sr.

==== Results ====
Democratic primary results
Party	Candidate	Votes	%
Democratic	Lynn Posey	53,258	43.1
Democratic	Addie Green	41,917	33.9
Democratic	John C. Rush, Sr.	28,502	23.0
Total votes		123,677	100.0

==== Runoff results ====
Democratic primary runoff results
Party	Candidate	Votes	%
Democratic	Lynn Posey	49,435	59.8
Democratic	Addie Green	33,199	40.2
Total votes		82,634	100.0

==== Candidates ====
- Charles Barbour, nephew of Gov. Haley Barbour and Hinds County supervisor
- Jimmy Foster, former mayor of Pearl, Mississippi

==== Results ====
Republican primary results
Party	Candidate	Votes	%
Republican	Charles Barbour	37,858	62.2
Republican	Jimmy Foster	22,984	37.8
Total votes		60,842	100.0

==== Results ====
2007 Mississippi Public Service Commissioner, Central District election
Party	Candidate	Votes	%
Democratic	Lynn Posey	122,417	50.6
Republican	Charles Barbour	112,782	46.6
Reform	Lee Dilworth	6,833	2.8
Total votes		242,032	100.0

Mississippi Public Service Commissioner, Southern District election, 2007
- November 6, 2007

Nominee	Leonard Bentz	Mike Collier
Party	Republican	Democratic
Popular vote	139,124	109,737
Percentage	55.9%	44.1%
- County results Bentz: 50–60% 60–70% 70–80% Collier: 50–60% 60–70%
Southern District Commissioner before election
Leonard Bentz
Republican
Elected Southern District Commissioner
Leonard Bentz
Republican

=== Southern District ===
In 2004, incumbent Republican Michael Callahan, who was first elected in 1999 and switched parties in 2004, abruptly resigned from his post in November 2005 to take over as CEO of a trade association. In April 2005, Leonard Bentz, a Republican state representative from Biloxi, was appointed to the post.

==== Candidates ====
- James M. Buckhaults, a former Ellisville, Mississippi alderman
- Mike Collier, retired insurance agent

==== Results ====
Democratic primary results
Party	Candidate	Votes	%
Democratic	Mike Collier	69,218	53.8
Democratic	James M. Buckhaults	59,394	46.2
Total votes		128,612	100.0

==== Candidates ====
- Leonard Bentz, incumbent
- Ray Crawford

==== Results ====
Republican primary results
Party	Candidate	Votes	%
Republican	Leonard Bentz	51,633	76.8
Republican	Ray Crawford	15,567	23.2
Total votes		67,200	100.0

==== Results ====
2007 Mississippi Public Service Commissioner, Southern District election
Party	Candidate	Votes	%
Republican	Leonard Bentz (incumbent)	139,124	55.9
Democratic	Mike Collier	109,737	44.1
Total votes		248,861	100.0

== Transportation Commission ==
Mississippi Transportation Commissioner, Northern District election, 2007
- November 6, 2007
Nominee	Bill R. Minor
Party	Democratic
Popular vote	196,558
Percentage	100%
- County results Minor: >90%
Northern District Commissioner before election
Bill R. Minor
Democratic
Elected Northern District Commissioner
Bill R. Minor
Democratic

=== Northern District ===
Incumbent Democrat Bill Minor ran for reelection. He won in the primary and was unopposed in the general election.

==== Candidates ====
- James K. Hurt
- Larry Lee
- William "Bill" R. Minor, incumbent

==== Results ====
Democratic primary results
Party	Candidate	Votes	%
Democratic	Bill Minor	105,767	57.4
Democratic	James K. Hurt	49,487	26.8
Democratic	Larry Lee	29,158	15.8
Total votes		184,412	100.0

==== Results ====
Democratic primary results
Party	Candidate	Votes	%
Democratic	Bill Minor (incumbent)	196,558	100.0
Total votes		196,558	100.0

=== Central District ===
Incumbent Republican Dick Hall ran for reelection. He was unopposed in the primary and won in the general election.

Mississippi Transportation Commissioner, Central District election, 2007
- November 6, 2007
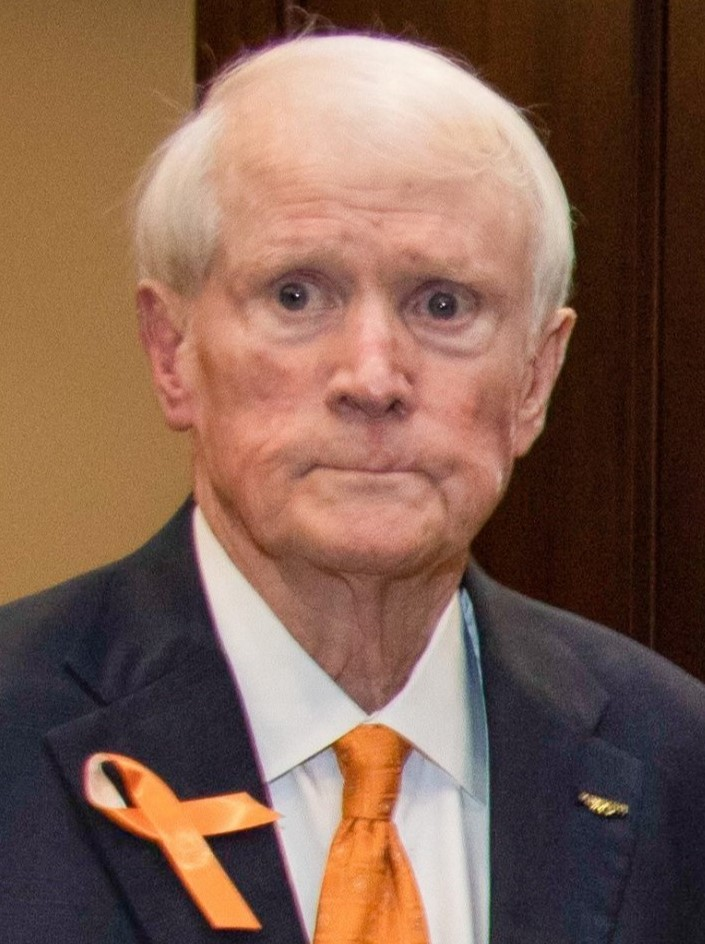

Nominee	Dick Hall	Rudolph Warnock
Party	Republican	Democratic
Popular vote	126,145	115,534
Percentage	52.2%	47.8%
- County results Hall: 50–60% 60–70% 70–80% Warnock: 50–60% 60–70% 70–80% 80–90%
Central District Commissioner before election
Dick Hall
Republican
Elected Central District Commissioner
Dick Hall
Republican

==== Candidates ====
- Rudolph "Rudy" Warnock, Jr., civil engineer for Madison County

==== Results ====
Democratic primary results
Party	Candidate	Votes	%
Democratic	Rudolph "Rudy" Warnock, Jr.	69,756	100.0
Total votes		196,558	100.0

==== Candidates ====
- Dick Hall, incumbent

==== Results ====
2007 Mississippi Transportation Commissioner, Central District election
Party	Candidate	Votes	%
Republican	Dick Hall (incumbent)	126,145	52.2
Democratic	Rudolph Warnock	115,534	47.8
Total votes		241,679	100.0

=== Southern District ===
Incumbent Democrat Wayne Brown ran for reelection. He won in the primary and the general election.

Mississippi Transportation Commissioner, Southern District election, 2007
- November 6, 2007

Nominee	Wayne Brown	Larry Benefield
Party	Democratic	Republican
Popular vote	133,029	120,293
Percentage	52.5%	47.5%
- County results Brown: 50–60% 60–70% 70–80% Benefield: 50–60% 60–70%
Southern District Commissioner before election
Wayne Brown
Democratic
Elected Southern District Commissioner
Wayne Brown
Democratic

==== Candidates ====
- Wayne Brown, incumbent
- Paul B. Stewart
- Chad Toney

==== Results ====
Democratic primary results
Party	Candidate	Votes	%
Democratic	Wayne Brown (incumbent)	79,531	58.2
Democratic	Paul B. Stewart	31,799	23.3
Democratic	Chad Toney	25,350	18.5
Total votes		136,680	100.0

==== Candidates ====
- Larry Benefield, supervisor for Harrison County
- Dwayne R. Bonner
- E. Spencer Garrett
- Arlin Regan

==== Results ====
Republican primary results
Party	Candidate	Votes	%
Republican	Larry Benefield	46,544	63.3
Republican	Arlin Regan	9,848	13.4
Republican	E. Spencer Garrett	8,722	11.9
Republican	Dwayne R. Bonner	8,423	11.5
Total votes		73,537	100.0

==== Results ====
2007 Mississippi Transportation Commissioner, Southern District election
Party	Candidate	Votes	%
Democratic	Wayne Brown (incumbent)	133,029	52.5
Republican	Larry Benefield	120,293	47.5
Total votes		253,322	100.0
