= 2027 Mississippi Commissioner of Agriculture and Commerce election =

- November 2, 2027
Party	Republican	Democratic
Incumbent commissioner
Andy Gipson
Republican

The 2027 Mississippi Commissioner of Agriculture and Commerce election will be held on November 2, 2027, to elect the Mississippi Commissioner of Agriculture and Commerce to a four-year term. Primary elections will be held on August 3, 2027. Incumbent Republican commissioner Andy Gipson is retiring to run for governor.

== Republican primary ==
=== Candidates ===
==== Declared ====
- Kyle Cockrell, farmers market owner
- Vince Mangold, state representative from the 53rd district (2016–present)

==== Declined ====
- Andy Gipson, incumbent commissioner (running for governor)
