= Deer Island Coastal Preserve =

US island

Coordinates: 30°22′33″N 88°50′57″W

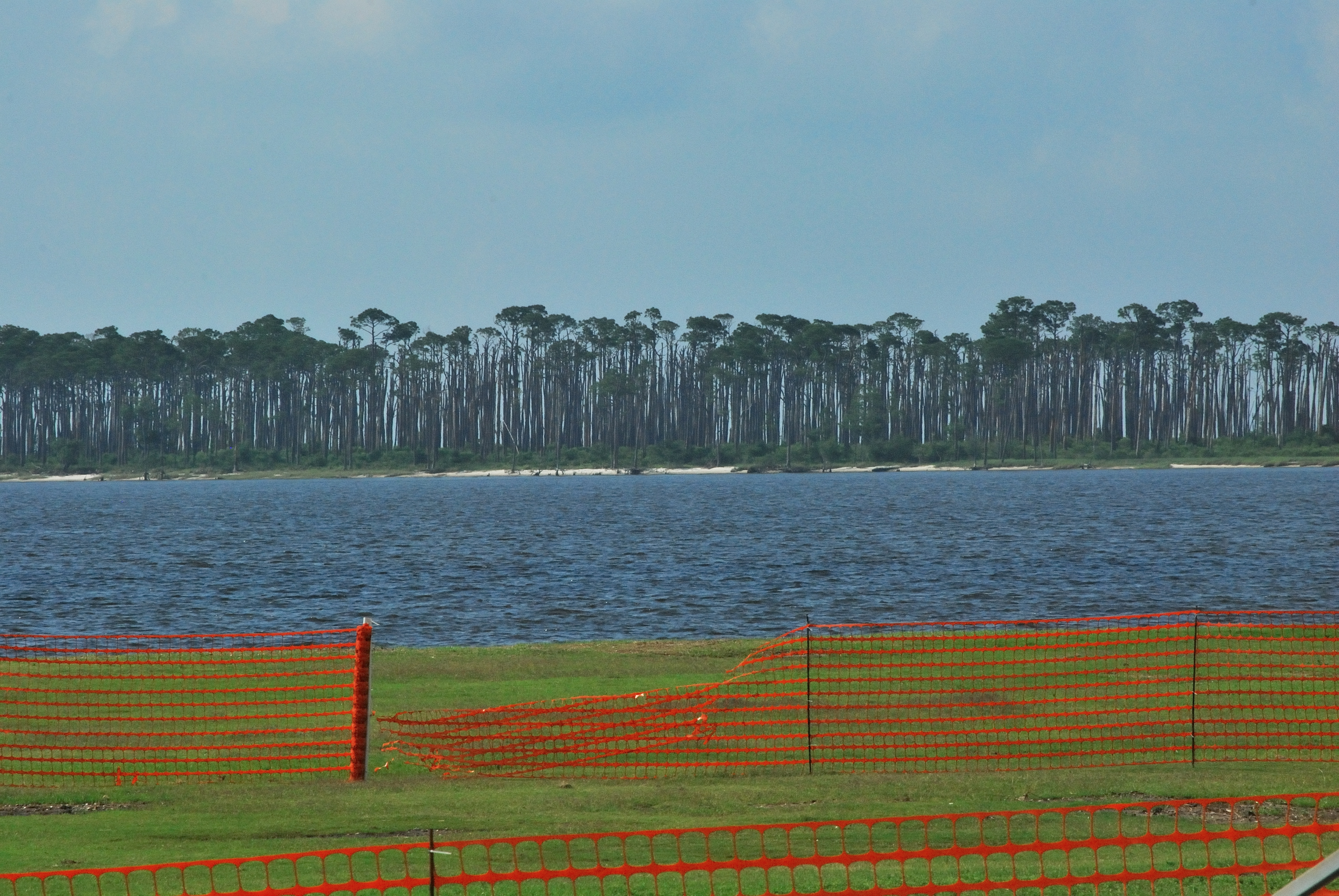
Deer Island as seen from Point Cadet

Deer Island Coastal Preserve is on Deer Island, an island off the coast of Biloxi, Mississippi that was once part of the mainland and is not a barrier island. It is the closest island to the Mississippi Gulf Coast, and consists of approximately 400 acres (1.6 km^{2}). It contains a historical marker.

== History ==
Deer island is home to 10 endangered species of plants and animals.

For several years, local casinos tried to develop the island. However, the majority of the island was acquired by the State of Mississippi on May 24, 2002, which intends to preserve its current undeveloped state, organized by former Mississippi Secretary of State Eric Clark.

Former Mississippi Secretary of State Eric Clark was able to organize the acquisition by the state of about 16,000 acres of coastal wetlands and helped establish Deer Island Coastal Preserve. A historical marker commemorates the preserve's establishment, erected by the State of Mississippi.

In 2011, TITANTubes, sometimes referred to as geotubes, were utilized as low profile dune cores to protect the island.

== See also ==
- Eric Clark Coastal Preserve, in Jackson County, Mississippi
