= Wayne Burkes =

American politician (1929–2020)

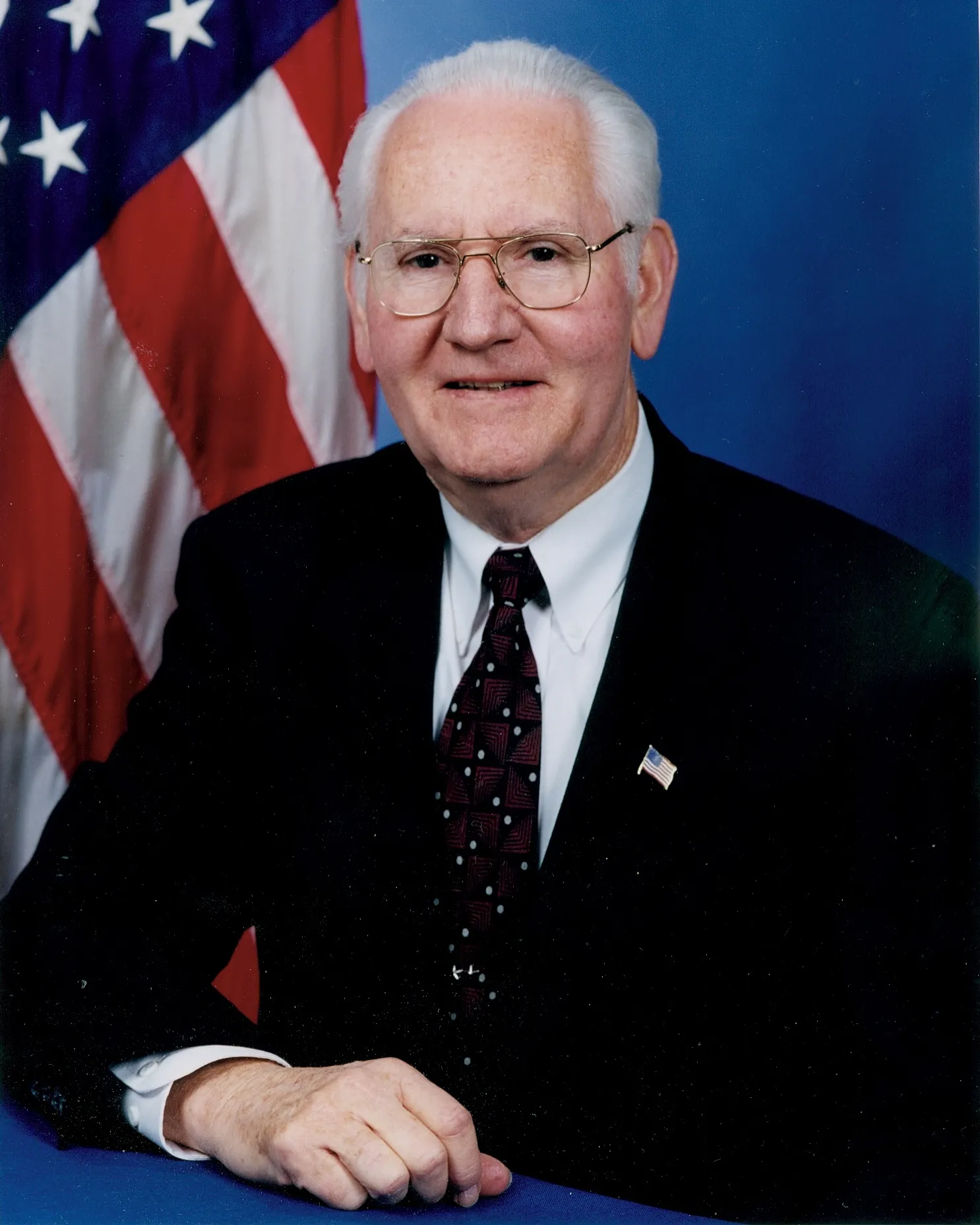

Commissioner for the Mississippi Transportation Commission for the Central District
- In office 1989–1998
- Preceded by: Sam Waggoner
- Succeeded by: Dick Hall

Member of the Mississippi Senate from the 29th district
- In office January 1980 – 1989
- Succeeded by: Richard White

Member of the Mississippi House of Representatives from the 31-I district
- In office January 1976 – January 1980

Personal details
- Born: December 26, 1929 Neshoba County, Mississippi, U.S.
- Died: May 5, 2020 (aged 90) Kosciusko, Mississippi, U.S.
- Party: Republican Party (from 1995)
- Other political affiliations: Democratic Party (before 1995)

Wayne Oliver Burkes (December 6, 1929 – May 5, 2020) was an American politician, Baptist minister, and military officer.

== Early life and education ==
Burkes was born in Neshoba County, Mississippi near Philadelphia, Mississippi on December 6, 1929. He graduated from Arlington High School. He graduated from Mississippi College with a Bachelor of Science in 1955, Master of Education in 1974, and an honorary Legum Doctor degree. He also studied at the New Orleans Baptist Theological Seminary, earning a Master of Divinity in 1966.

He did graduate work at the University of Southern Mississippi, and is a graduate of the U.S. Air Force Pilot Training School, the Industrial College of the Armed Forces, the Air University's Air War College, and the Transportation Executive Institute of the University of Virginia. He served in the Mississippi Air National Guard as a pilot from 1956 to 1989 and retired as a lieutenant general.

He worked as an underwriter for Allstate Insurance before becoming an ordained pastor in Bolton, Mississippi in 1966, a position he would hold until 1989. He also worked at Hinds Community College from 1969 to 1976.

== Career and later life ==
Burkes served as a Democrat in the Mississippi House of Representatives from 1976 to 1980 and in the Mississippi Senate from 1980 to 1989. In 1989, he was elected Highway Commissioner of the Central District of Mississippi.

In 1995, he switched to the Republican Party to run for reelection, becoming the first ever serious GOP candidate for Highway/Transportation Commissioner in the state and only the second ever and was reelected overwhelmingly.

He was nominated by President Bill Clinton for a seat on the Surface Transportation Board (STB), and served from 1999 to 2002. He continued to serve as vice-chairman before resigning on March 20, 2003. Burkes ran for Mississippi State Treasurer in 2003, but lost to future Governor Tate Reeves in the Republican primary.

Burkes died on May 5, 2020.
