= 2003 Mississippi elections =

A general election was held in Mississippi on November 4, 2003, to elect to four-year terms all members of the state legislature (122 representatives, 52 senators), the offices of governor, lieutenant governor, attorney general, state treasurer, state auditor, secretary of state, commissioner of agriculture and commerce, and commissioner of insurance, plus all three members of the Transportation Commission and all three members of the Public Service Commission.

== Results for the state legislature ==
All 122 representatives and all 52 senators are elected for four-year terms with no term limits. The state legislature draws up separate district map for the House of Representatives and for the Senate every 10 years following each census.

== Background for statewide elections ==
According to Article 5, Sections 140-41 of the state constitution, the governor and the other seven statewide officers are elected if they receive a majority of electoral votes and a majority of the direct total popular vote. A candidate wins an electoral vote by winning a plurality of the votes in a state house district. With 122 House Districts, a majority of electoral votes is 62. When no candidate receives both majorities, the House of Representatives decides the election between the two persons receiving the highest number of popular votes. (Note: The electoral vote system was repealed via a public referendum in 2020.)

== Governor ==
Incumbent Democrat Ronnie Musgrove faced Republican challenger Haley Barbour as well as the Constitution Party's John Thomas Cripps, the Green Party's Sherman Lee Dillon, and the Reform Party's Shawn O'Hara. In 1999, Lieutenant Governor Musgrove, won the gubernatorial election against Republican Mike Parker, a former U.S. representative, in a close election that necessitated the Mississippi House of Representatives to decide the outcome because of a tie in the electoral votes. Musgrove lost his re-election bid in 2003 to Barbour after a competitive race.

Results for governor's race
Party	Candidate	Popular votes	Pop. vote %	Electoral votes	Electoral vote %
Republican	Haley Barbour	470,404	52.59%	76	62.30%
Democrat	Ronnie Musgrove	409,787	45.81%	46	37.70%
Constitution	John Thomas Cripps	6,317	0.71%	0	0.00%
Reform	Shawn O'Hara	4,070	0.46%	0	0.00%
Green	Sherman Lee Dillon	3,909	0.44%	0	0.00%
Total		894,487	100.00%	122	100.0%

== Lieutenant governor ==
Mississippi Lieutenant Gubernatorial election, 2003
- November 4, 2003
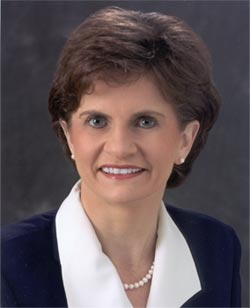

Nominee	Amy Tuck	Barbara Blackmon
Party	Republican	Democratic
Electoral vote	84	38
Popular vote	542,129	329,454
Percentage	60.98%	37.06%
- County results Tuck: 40–50% 50–60% 60–70% 70–80% 80–90% Blackmon: 40–50% 50–60% 60–70% 70–80% 80–90%
Lieutenant Governor before election
Amy Tuck
Republican
Elected Lieutenant Governor
Amy Tuck
Republican

=== Democratic primary ===
==== Candidates ====
- Barbara Blackmon, state senator
- Troy D. Brown Sr., business owner
- James L. Roberts Jr., judge on the Mississippi Supreme Court

==== Results ====
Democratic primary results
Party	Candidate	Votes	%
Democratic	Barbara Blackmon	283,177	53.7%
Democratic	James L. Roberts, Jr.	194,204	36.9%
Democratic	Troy D. Brown, Sr.	49,515	9.4%
Total votes		526,896	100.0

=== Republican nomination ===
==== Candidate ====
- Amy Tuck, incumbent

=== General election ===
Amy Tuck, elected to the office in 1999 as a Democrat, had switched to the Republican Party in December 2002 after taking positions on several issues, like re-districting, that opposed the state Democratic Party's stances. In her race for reelection, her challenger was Democratic state senator Barbara Blackmon, who was the first black woman to run for a statewide race. Tuck defeated Blackmon in the election.

==== Results ====
Results for lieutenant governor's race
Party	Candidate	Popular votes	Pop. vote %	Electoral votes	Electoral vote %
Republican	Amy Tuck	542,129	60.98%	84	68.85%
Democrat	Barbara Blackmon	329,454	37.06%	38	31.15%
Reform	Anna Reives	17,481	1.97%	0	0.00%
Total		889,064	100.00%	122	100.00%

== Attorney general ==
Mississippi Attorney General election, 2003
- November 4, 2003
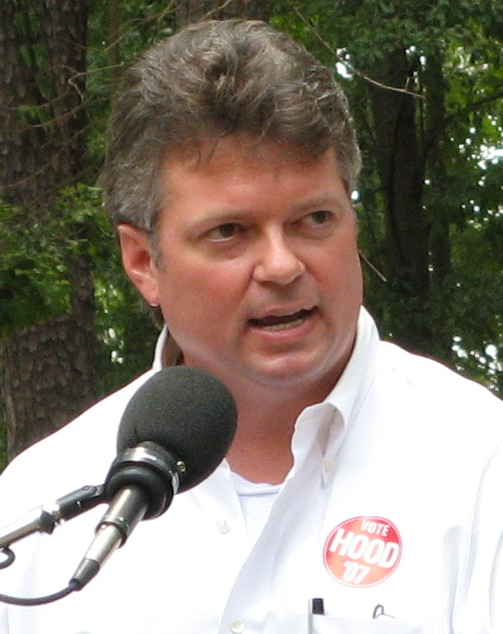

Nominee	Jim Hood	Scott Newton
Party	Democratic	Republican
Electoral vote	100	22
Popular vote	548,046	326,042
Percentage	62.69%	37.30%
- County results Hood: 50–60% 60–70% 70–80% 80–90% Newton: 50–60% 60–70%
Attorney General before election
Mike Moore
Democratic
Elected Attorney General
Jim Hood
Democratic

=== Democratic nomination ===
==== Candidate ====
- Jim Hood, district attorney of Northern Mississippi

=== Republican nomination ===
==== Candidate ====
- Scott Newton, former FBI agent

=== General election ===
Mike Moore, a Democrat who had served four terms starting in 1988, declined to run for re-election. Moore's protégé Jim Hood faced Republican Scott Newton. Newton ran many ads attacking Hood on being soft on crime and especially criticized Hood's handling of a rape case, while Hood focused on Newton's supposed inexperience. Hood won the election over Newton.

==== Results ====
Results for attorney general's race
Party	Candidate	Popular votes	Pop. vote %	Electoral votes	Electoral vote %
Democrat	Jim Hood	548,046	62.69%	100	81.97%
Republican	Scott Newton	326,042	37.30%	22	18.03%
Total		874,088	100.00%	122	100.0%

== State Treasurer ==
Mississippi State Treasurer election, 2003
- November 4, 2003
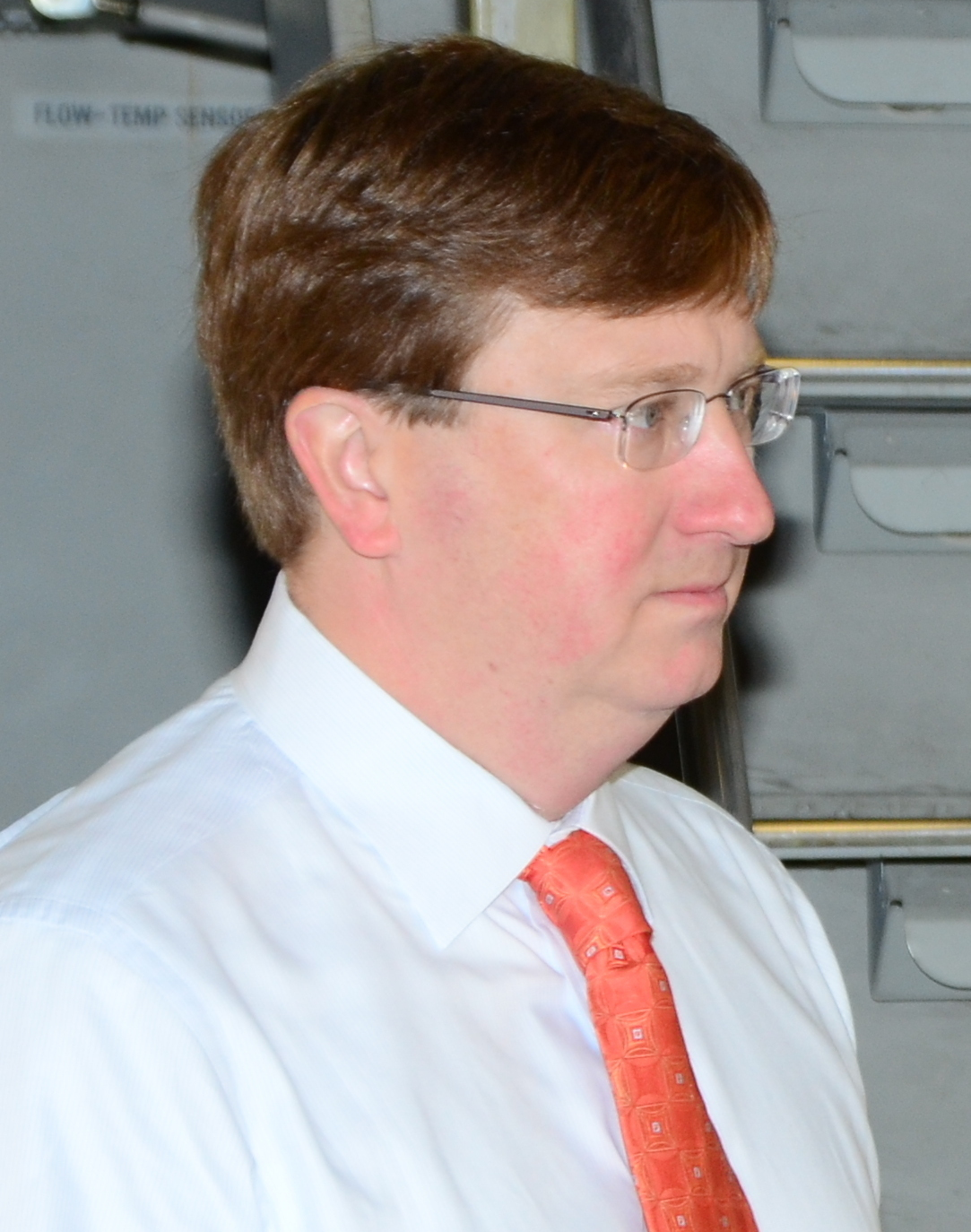

Nominee	Tate Reeves	Gary Anderson
Party	Republican	Democratic
Electoral vote	66	56
Popular vote	447,860	403,307
Percentage	51.80%	46.64%
- County results Reeves: 40–50% 50–60% 60–70% 70–80% Anderson: 40–50% 50–60% 60–70% 70–80% 80–90%
State Treasurer before election
Marshall Bennett
Democratic
Elected State Treasurer
Tate Reeves
Republican

=== Democratic primary ===
==== Candidates ====
- Gary Anderson
- Cindy Ayers Elliott
- Robert H. Smith

==== Results ====
Democratic primary results
Party	Candidate	Votes	%
Democratic	Gary Anderson	197,320	40.1%
Democratic	Robert H. Smith	173,866	35.3%
Democratic	Cindy Ayers Eliott	121,468	24.7%
Total votes		492,654	100.0

==== Runoff ====
Democratic runoff results
Party	Candidate	Votes	%
Democratic	Gary Anderson	189,388	53.3%
Democratic	Robert H. Smith	165,661	46.7%
Total votes		355,049	100.0

=== Republican primary ===
==== Candidates ====
- Wayne Burkes
- Andrew Ketchings
- Tate Reeves, banker

==== Results ====
Republican primary results
Party	Candidate	Votes	%
Republican	Tate Reeves	81,263	48.6%
Republican	Wayne Burkes	51,896	31.1%
Republican	Andrew Ketchings	33,969	20.3%
Total votes		167,128	100.0

==== Runoff ====
Republican runoff results
Party	Candidate	Votes	%
Republican	Tate Reeves	49,466	69.0%
Republican	Wayne Burkes	22,206	31.0%
Total votes		71,672	100.0

=== General election ===
Four-term Democrat Marshall Bennett resigned in early 2003 to join a New York City law firm and was replaced by Peyton Prospere, who was appointed by Governor Musgrove to complete the term. With Prospere not seeking election in his own right, Gary Anderson ran for the Democrats. The Republicans chose 29-year-old banker Tate Reeves. In a close race, Reeves won over Anderson.

==== Results ====
Results for state treasurer's race
Party	Candidate	Popular votes	Pop. vote %	Electoral votes	Electoral vote %
Republican	Tate Reeves	447,860	51.80%	66	54.10%
Democrat	Gary Anderson	403,307	46.64%	56	45.90%
Reform	Lee Dilworth	13,507	1.56%	0	0.00%
Total		864,674	100.00%	122	100.0%

== State Auditor ==
Mississippi State Auditor election, 2003
- November 4, 2003
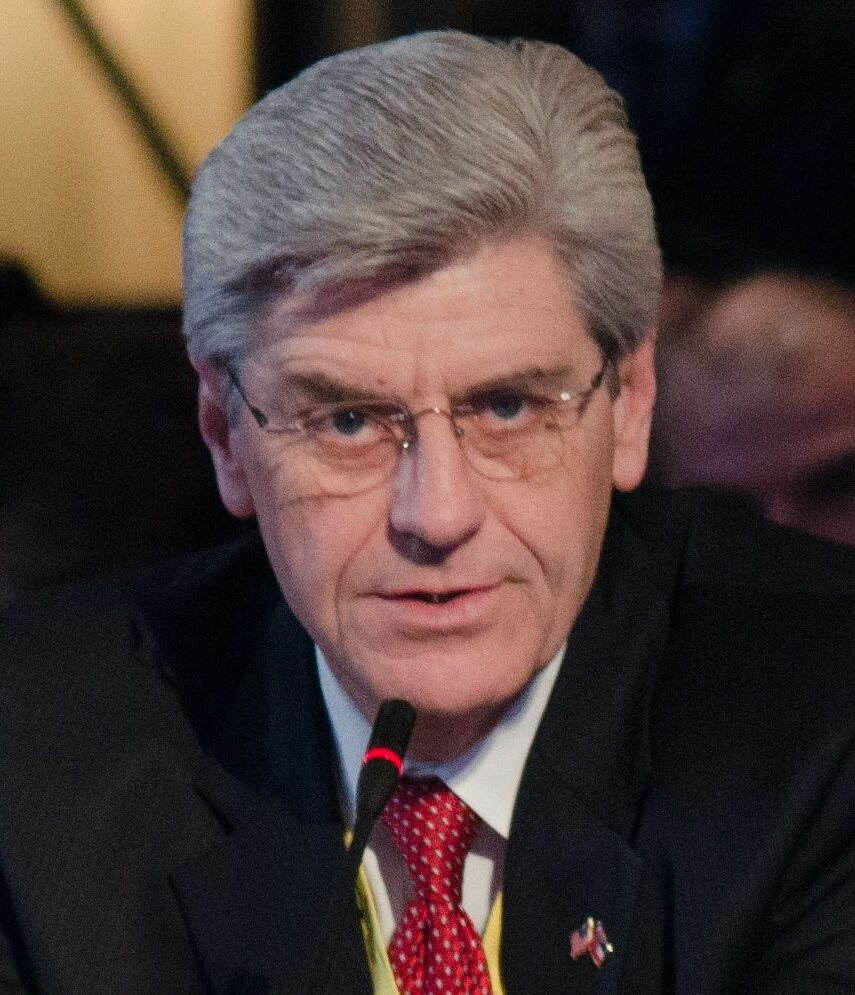

Nominee	Phil Bryant	Billy Blackburn
Party	Republican	Reform
Electoral vote	119	3
Popular vote	587,212	182,292
Percentage	76.31%	23.69%
- County results Bryant: 50–60% 60–70% 70–80% 80–90% >90% Blackburn: 50–60%
State Auditor before election
Phil Bryant
Republican
Elected State Auditor
Phil Bryant
Republican

=== Reform nomination ===
==== Candidate ====
- Billy Blackburn

=== Republican nomination ===
==== Candidate ====
- Phil Bryant, incumbent

=== General election ===
Republican Phil Bryant, first appointed by Gov. Kirk Fordice in 1996 to fill an unexpired term and then won in 1999, won over Reform Party candidate Billy Blackburn.

==== Results ====
Results for state auditor's race
Party	Candidate	Popular votes	Pop. vote %	Electoral votes	Electoral vote %
Republican	Phil Bryant	587,212	76.31%	119	97.54%
Reform	Billy Blackburn	182,292	23.69%	3	2.46%
Total		769,504	100.00%	122	100.0%

== Secretary of State ==
Mississippi Secretary of State election, 2003
- November 4, 2003

Nominee	Eric Clark	Julio Del Castillo	Brenda Blackburn
Party	Democratic	Republican	Reform
Electoral vote	117	5	0
Popular vote	610,461	201,765	47,296
Percentage	71.02%	23.47%	5.50%
- County results Clark: 50–60% 60–70% 70–80% 80–90% Castillo: 50–60%
Secretary of State before election
Eric Clark
Democratic
Elected Secretary of State
Eric Clark
Democratic

=== Democratic nomination ===
==== Candidate ====
- Eric Clark, incumbent

=== Reform nomination ===
==== Candidate ====
- Brenda Blackburn

=== Republican nomination ===
==== Candidate ====
- Julio Del Castillo

=== General election ===
Three-term incumbent Democrat Eric Clark won over Republican challenger Julio Del Castillo.

==== Results ====
Results for secretary of state's race
Party	Candidate	Popular votes	Pop. vote %	Electoral votes	Electoral vote %
Democrat	Eric Clark	610,461	71.02%	117	95.90%
Republican	Julio Del Castillo	201,765	23.47%	5	4.10%
Reform	Brenda Blackburn	47,296	5.50%	0	0.00%
Total		859,522	100.00%	122	100.0%

== Commissioner of Agriculture and Commerce ==
Mississippi Commissioner of Agriculture and Commerce election, 2003
- November 4, 2003

Nominee	Lester Spell	Max Phillips
Party	Democratic	Republican
Electoral vote	105	17
Popular vote	564,283	274,097
Percentage	66.11%	32.11%
- County results Spell: 40–50% 50–60% 60–70% 70–80% 80–90% Phillips: 50–60% 60–70%
Commissioner of Agriculture and Commerce before election
Lester Spell
Democratic
Elected Commissioner of Agriculture and Commerce
Lester Spell
Democratic

=== Democratic nomination ===
==== Candidate ====
- Lester Spell, incumbent

=== Republican primary ===
==== Candidates ====
- Roger D. Crowder
- Kyle Weston Magee
- Max Phillips
- Fred T. Smith

==== Results ====
Republican primary results
Party	Candidate	Votes	%
Republican	Roger D. Crowder	64,521	41.7%
Republican	Max Phillips	38,731	25.0%
Republican	Kyle Weston Magee	26,068	16.8%
Republican	Fred T. Smith	25,457	16.4%
Total votes		154,777	100.0

==== Runoff ====
Republican runoff results
Party	Candidate	Votes	%
Republican	Max Phillips	34,840	50.3%
Republican	Roger Crowder	34,404	49.7%
Total votes		69,244	100.0

=== General election ===
Democrat Lester Spell was re-elected to a third term over Republican Max Phillips.

==== Results ====
Results for Commissioner of Agriculture and Industry race
Party	Candidate	Popular votes	Pop. vote %	Electoral votes	Electoral vote %
Democrat	Lester Spell	564,283	66.11%	105	86.07%
Republican	Max Phillips	274,097	32.11%	17	13.93%
Reform	Bob Claunch	15,229	1.78%	0	0.00%
Total		853,609	100.00%	122	100.0%

== Commissioner of Insurance ==
Mississippi Commissioner of Insurance election, 2003
- November 4, 2003

Nominee	George Dale	Aaron DuPuy
Party	Democratic	Republican
Electoral vote	114	8
Popular vote	610,341	211,859
Percentage	71.27%	24.77%
- County results Dale: 50–60% 60–70% 70–80% 80–90% >90% DuPuy: 50–60%
Commissioner of Insurance before election
George Dale
Democratic
Elected Commissioner of Insurance
George Dale
Democratic

=== Democratic nomination ===
==== Candidate ====
- George Dale, incumbent

=== Reform nomination ===
==== Candidate ====
- Barbara Dale Washer

=== Republican nomination ===
==== Candidate ====
- Aaron DuPuy

=== General election ===
Democrat George Dale won an eighth term over Republican Aaron DuPuy.

==== Results ====
Results for Commissioner of Insurance race
Party	Candidate	Popular votes	Pop. vote %	Electoral votes	Electoral vote %
Democrat	George Dale	610,341	71.27%	114	93.44%
Republican	Aaron DuPuy	211,859	24.77%	8	6.56%
Reform	Barbara Dale Washer	32,969	3.86%	0	0.00%
Total			100.00%	122	100.0%

== Public Service Commission ==
Mississippi Public Service Commissioner, Northern District election, 2003
- November 4, 2003

Nominee	Bo Robinson	Kerry Hunt
Party	Democratic	Reform
Popular vote	216,331	41,610
Percentage	83.9%	16.1%
- County results Robinson: 50–60% 70–80% 80–90% >90%
Northern District Commissioner before election
Bo Robinson
Democratic
Elected Northern District Commissioner
Bo Robinson
Democratic

=== Northern district ===
==== Democratic primary ====
===== Candidates =====
- Bo Robinson, incumbent
- Benton White

===== Results =====
Democratic primary results
Party	Candidate	Votes	%
Democratic	Bo Robinson	158,810	79.6%
Democratic	Benton White	40,632	20.4%
Total votes		199,442	100.0

==== Reform nomination ====
===== Candidate =====
- Kerry Hunt

==== General election ====
Democrat Bo Robinson won over Reform Kerry Hunt.

===== Results =====
Mississippi Public Service Commissioner, Northern District election, 2003
Party	Candidate	Votes	%
Democratic	Bo Robinson	216,331	83.9%
Reform	Kerry Hunt	41,610	16.1%
Total votes		257,941	100.0
Democratic hold			

Mississippi Public Service Commissioner, Central District election, 2003
- November 4, 2003

Nominee	Nielsen Cochran	L.D. Horne, Sr.
Party	Republican	Democratic
Popular vote	164,394	110,779
Percentage	58.5%	39.4%
- County results Cochran: 40–50% 50–60% 60–70% 70–80% 80–90% Horne: 40–50% 50–60% 60–70% 70–80%
Central District Commissioner before election
Nielsen Cochran
Republican
Elected Central District Commissioner
Nielsen Cochran
Republican

=== Central district ===
==== Democratic nomination ====
===== Candidate =====
- L.D. Horne Sr.

==== Reform nomination ====
===== Candidate =====
- Miek R. Ivey

==== Candidate ====
- Nielsen Cochran, incumbent

==== General election ====
Republican Nielsen Cochran won over Democrat L.D. Horne Sr. and Reform Miek R. Ivey.

==== Results ====
Mississippi Public Service Commissioner, Central District election, 2003
Party	Candidate	Votes	%
Republican	Nielsen Cochran	164,394	58.5%
Democratic	L.D. Horne, Sr.	110,779	39.4%
Reform	Mike R. Ivey	6,072	2.2%
Total votes		281,245	100.0
Republican hold			

Mississippi Public Service Commissioner, Southern District election, 2003
- November 4, 2003

Nominee	Michael Callahan	Larry Albritton
Party	Democratic	Republican
Popular vote	150,599	138,147
Percentage	51.3%	47.0%
- County results Albritton: 40–50% 50–60% 60–70% Callahan: 50–60% 60–70% 70–80%
Southern District Commissioner before election
Michael Callahan
Democratic
Elected Southern District Commissioner
Michael Callahan
Democratic

=== Southern district ===
==== Democratic nomination ====
===== Candidate =====
- Michael Callahan, incumbent

==== Reform nomination ====
===== Candidate =====
- Anthony Sahuque

==== Candidate ====
- Larry Albritton

==== General election ====
Democrat Michael Callahan won over Republican Larry Albritton and Reform Anthony Sahuque.

===== Results =====
Mississippi Public Service Commissioner, Southern District election, 2003
Party	Candidate	Votes	%
Democratic	Michael Callahan	150,599	51.3%
Republican	Larry Albritton	138,147	47.0%
Reform	Anthony Sahuque	4,962	1.7%
Total votes		293,708	100.0
Democratic hold			

== Transportation Commission ==
Mississippi Transportation Commissioner, Northern District election, 2003
- November 4, 2003

Nominee	Bill R. Minor	John M. Caldwell, Sr.
Party	Democratic	Republican
Popular vote	156,667	115,182
Percentage	57.6%	42.4%
- County results Minor: 50–60% 60–70% 70–80% 80–90% Caldwell: 70–80%
Northern District Commissioner before election
Zach Stewart
Democratic
Elected Northern District Commissioner
Bill R. Minor
Democratic

=== Northern district ===
==== Democratic primary ====
===== Candidates =====
- A.T. Marlar Jr.
- William R. (Bill) Minor
- Thomas (Tod) Todd

===== Results =====
Democratic primary results
Party	Candidate	Votes	%
Democratic	William R. Minor	108,558	54.3%
Democratic	Thomas Todd	67,063	33.6%
Democratic	A.T. Marlar, Jr.	24,155	12.1%
Total votes		199,776	100.0

==== Republican primary ====
===== Candidates =====
- John M. Caldwell Sr.
- Larry Lee

===== Results =====
Republican primary results
Party	Candidate	Votes	%
Republican	John M. Caldwell, Sr.	25,985	79.9%
Republican	Larry Lee	6,517	20.1%
Total votes		32,502	100.0

==== General election ====
Democrat Bill R. Minor won over Republican John M. Caldwell Sr.

===== Results =====
Mississippi Transportation Commissioner, Northern District election, 2003
Party	Candidate	Votes	%
Democratic	William R. Minor	156,667	57.6%
Republican	John M. Caldwell, Sr.	115,182	42.4%
Total votes		271,849	100.0
Democratic hold			

Mississippi Transportation Commissioner, Central District election, 2003
- November 4, 2003
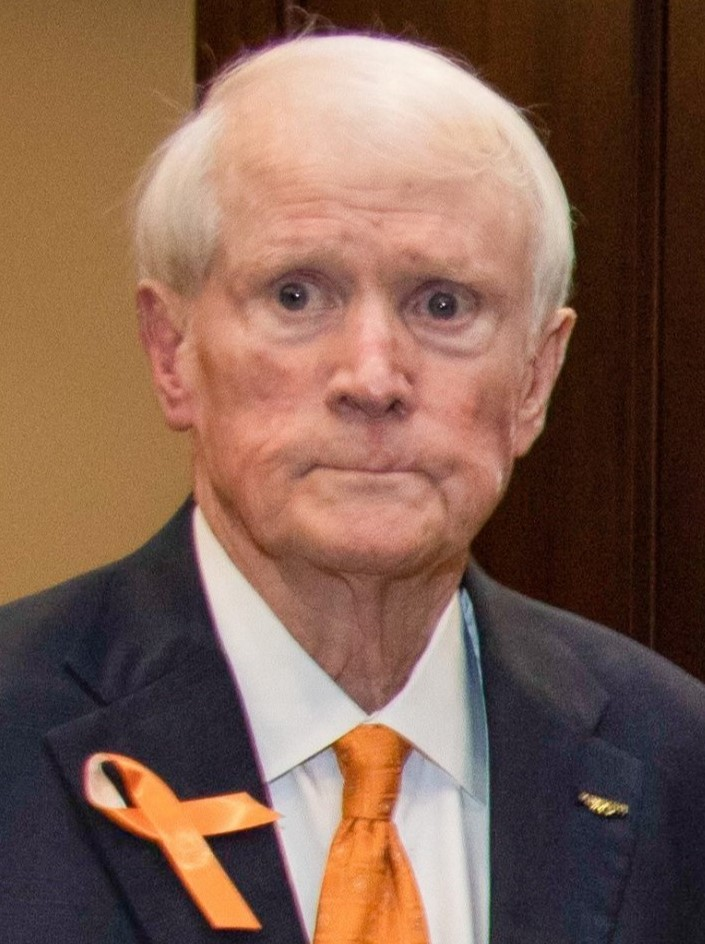

Nominee	Dick Hall	W.C. Alderman
Party	Republican	Democratic
Popular vote	152,320	123,013
Percentage	54.3%	43.9%
- County results Hall: 40–50% 50–60% 60–70% 80–90% Alderman: 50–60% 60–70% 70–80%
Central District Commissioner before election
Dick Hall
Republican
Elected Central District Commissioner
Dick Hall
Republican

=== Central district ===
==== Democratic nomination ====
===== Candidate =====
- W.C. Alderman

==== Reform nomination ====
===== Candidate =====
- Jimmy Loper

==== Candidate ====
- Dick Hall, incumbent

==== General election ====
Republican Dick Hall won over Democrat W.C. Alderman and Reform Jimmy Loper.

===== Results =====
Mississippi Transportation Commissioner, Central District election, 2003
Party	Candidate	Votes	%
Republican	Dick Hall	152,320	54.3%
Democratic	W.C. Alderman	123,013	43.9%
Reform	Jimmy Loper	4,986	1.8%
Total votes		280,319	100.0
Republican hold			

Mississippi Transportation Commissioner, Southern District election, 2003
- November 4, 2003

Nominee	Wayne Brown	Arlin Regan
Party	Democratic	Republican
Popular vote	165,109	117,941
Percentage	56.1%	40.1%
- County results Brown: 40–50% 50–60% 60–70% 70–80% Regan: 50–60%
Southern District Commissioner before election
Wayne Brown
Democratic
Elected Southern District Commissioner
Wayne Brown
Democratic

=== Southern district ===
==== Democratic nomination ====
===== Candidate =====
- Wayne H. Brown

==== Reform nomination ====
===== Candidate =====
- Virgil C. Smith

==== Republican primary ====
===== Candidates =====
- Alana Abney
- Arlin Regan

===== Results =====
Republican primary results
Party	Candidate	Votes	%
Republican	Arlin Regan	31,066	52.3%
Republican	Alana Abney	28,376	47.7%
Total votes		59,442	100.0

==== General election ====
Democrat Wayne H. Brown won over Republican Arlin Regan and Reform Virgil C. Smith.

===== Results =====
Mississippi Transportation Commissioner, Southern District election, 2003
Party	Candidate	Votes	%
Democratic	Wayne H. Brown	165,109	56.1%
Republican	Arlin Regan	117,941	40.1%
Reform	Virgil C. Smith	11,247	1.8%
Total votes		294,297	100.0
Democratic hold			
