= MDAC =

MDAC may refer to:

- Malaysia Digital Arrival Card
- Mental Disability Advocacy Center
- Microsoft Data Access Components
- Mississippi Department of Agriculture and Commerce
- Multiple-dose activated charcoal
- Multiplying digital-to-analog converter
- Muscular Dystrophy Association of Canada
