= Eric Clark Coastal Preserve =

Protested land in Jackson County, Mississippi, US

- Interactive map of Eric Clark Coastal Preserve
- Location: 4401 Gautier Vancleave Road, Gautier, Mississippi, U.S.
- Coordinates: 30.411164°N 88.654866°W
- Area: 900 acres (360 ha)

Eric Clark Coastal Preserve is a 900 acres (360 ha) protected costal land in Gautier, in Jackson County, Mississippi, U.S. It was established by Mississippi's legislature in 2023, and is named for former Mississippi Secretary of State Eric Clark. It includes 7 walking trails that total around 2.5 miles (4.0 km), near the Pascagoula River.

A historical marker for the Eric Clark Coastal Preserve was erected 2024 by the Mississippi Department of Archives and History, to honor Clark. Eric Clark organized the acquisition in 2002 by the state of Mississippi of around 16,000 acres (6,500 ha) of coastal wetlands, and established Deer Island Coastal Preserve off the coast of Biloxi, Mississippi.
