= Jamie Franks (politician) =

American politician (born 1972)

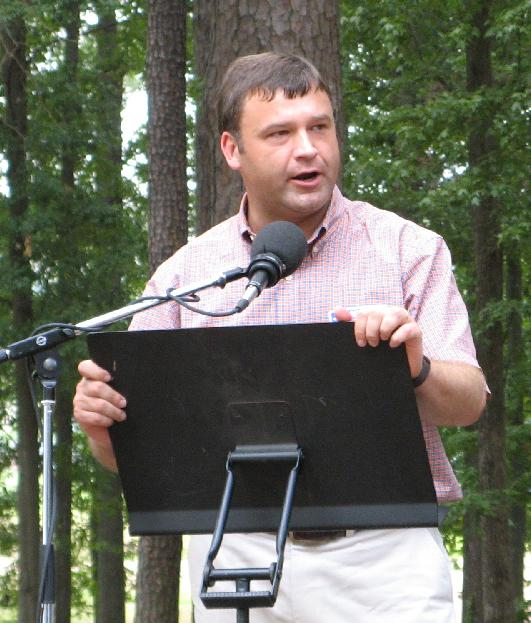

Chair of the Mississippi Democratic Party
- In office 2010–2015

Member of the Mississippi House of Representatives from the 19th district
- In office 2000–2007
- Succeeded by: Mark A. DuVall

Personal details
- Born: December 26, 1972 (age 53) Mooreville, Mississippi, U.S.
- Party: Democratic
- Education: University of Mississippi (BA); Mississippi College (JD)
- Profession: Attorney

James Franks (born December 26, 1972, in Mooreville, Mississippi) was the Chairman of the Mississippi Democratic Party and a Democratic member of the Mississippi House of Representatives, representing the state's 19th district from 2000 through 2007. His district included Lee, Itawamba and Tishomingo Counties.

He was the Democratic nominee for the office of Lieutenant Governor in the 2007 General Election, but was defeated by Republican State Auditor Phil Bryant on November 6, 2007. Bryant won with 59 percent of the vote.

The Mississippi Clarion-Ledger named Franks as a potential candidate in the special election to fill the seat of resigned U.S. House member Roger Wicker but Franks declined to run.

Party political offices
Preceded by Barbara Blackmon	Democratic nominee for Lieutenant Governor of Mississippi; 2007	Vacant Title next held by Tim Johnson
