= 2020 Mississippi Democratic presidential primary =

- March 10, 2020

41 delegates (36 pledged, 5 unpledged) to the Democratic National Convention The number of pledged delegates won is determined by the popular vote

Candidate	Joe Biden	Bernie Sanders
Home state	Delaware	Vermont
Delegate count	34	2
Popular vote	222,160	40,657
Percentage	80.96%	14.82%
- County results Joe Biden

The 2020 Mississippi Democratic presidential primary took place on March 10, 2020, as one of several states voting the week after Super Tuesday in the Democratic Party primaries for the 2020 presidential election. The Mississippi primary was an open primary, with the state awarding 41 delegates towards the 2020 Democratic National Convention, of which 36 were pledged delegates allocated on the basis of the results of the primary.

Former vice president Joe Biden overwhelmingly won the primary in the southern state and every county with 81% of the vote, winning 34 of the 36 delegates, as he was the only candidate to get above 15% of the vote statewide. Senator Bernie Sanders narrowly missed the 15% threshold, and so he only received 2 district delegates.

== Procedure ==
Mississippi was one of six states (along with Democrats Abroad) which held primaries on March 10, 2020, one week after Super Tuesday. Voting took place throughout the state from 7:00 a.m. until 7:00 p.m. In the open primary, candidates had to meet a threshold of 15 percent at the congressional district or statewide level in order to be considered viable. The 36 pledged delegates to the 2020 Democratic National Convention were allocated proportionally on the basis of the results of the primary. Of these, between 4 and 9 were allocated to each of the state's 4 congressional districts and another 5 were allocated to party leaders and elected officials (PLEO delegates), in addition to 8 at-large delegates. The March primary as part of Stage I on the primary timetable received no bonus delegates, in order to disperse the primaries between more different date clusters and keep too many states from hoarding on a March date.

After county conventions on March 14, 2020, where congressional district and state convention delegates were elected, congressional district conventions were slated for successive weeks between April 4 and April 25, 2020, in each of the state's congressional districts, at which district delegates to the national convention were selected. The state convention was then held on May 16, 2020, to vote on the 8 at-large and 5 pledged PLEO delegates for the Democratic National Convention. The delegation also included 5 unpledged PLEO delegates: 4 members of the Democratic National Committee and the sole representative from Congress, Bennie Thompson.

Pledged national convention delegates
Type	Del.
CD1	5
CD2	9
CD3	5
CD4	4
PLEO	5
At-large	8
Total pledged delegates	36

== Candidates ==
The following candidates qualified for the ballot in Mississippi:

Running

- Joe Biden
- Tulsi Gabbard
- Bernie Sanders

Withdrawn

- Michael Bloomberg
- Pete Buttigieg
- Amy Klobuchar
- Deval Patrick
- Tom Steyer
- Elizabeth Warren
- Andrew Yang

== Polling ==
Polling aggregation
Source of poll aggregation	Date updated	Dates polled	Joe Biden	Bernie Sanders	Tulsi Gabbard	Other/ Undecided (Note: Calculated by taking the difference of 100% and all other candidates combined)
270toWin	March 10, 2020	March 4–9, 2020	72.5%	25.0%	0.5%	2.0%
FiveThirtyEight	March 10, 2020	until March 9, 2020 (Note: FiveThirtyEight aggregates polls with a trendline regression of polls rather than a strict average of recent polls.)	70.7%	23.4%	0.4%	5.5%
Average			71.6%	24.2%	0.5%	3.7%
Mississippi primary results (March 10, 2020)			81.1%	14.8%	0.4%	3.7%

Tabulation of individual polls of the 2020 Mississippi Democratic primary
Poll source	Date(s) administered	Sample size (Note: Key: A – all adults RV – registered voters LV – likely voters V – unclear)	Margin of error	Joe Biden	Cory Booker	Pete Buttigieg	Kamala Harris	Bernie Sanders	Elizabeth Warren	Other	Undecided
Swayable	Mar 8–9, 2020	1,247 (LV)	± 4.0%	68%	–	–	–	28%	–	4% (Note: Gabbard with 0%; "Other" with 4%)	–
Data for Progress	Mar 4–7, 2020	340 (LV)	± 5.1%	77%	–	–	–	22%	–	1% (Note: Gabbard with 1%)	–
	Mar 5, 2020	Warren withdraws from the race									
	Mar 4, 2020	Bloomberg withdraws from the race									
	Mar 2, 2020	Klobuchar withdraws from the race									
	Mar 1, 2020	Buttigieg withdraws from the race									
	Jan 13, 2020	Booker withdraws from the race									
	Dec 3, 2019	Harris withdraws from the race									
NBC News/SurveyMonkey	Jul 2–16, 2019	282 (RV)	± 4.2%	47%	3%	3%	8%	21%	7%	5% (Note: Bennet with 3%; Williamson with 2%; Gillibrand, Inslee, and Klobuchar with 1%; Bullock, Castro, de Blasio, Delaney, Gabbard, Gravel, Hickenlooper, Messam, Moulton, O'Rourke, Ryan, and Yang with 0%)	3%
Chism Strategies/Millsaps College	Jun 20–21, 2019	523 (LV)	± 4.3%	50%	2%	2%	5%	7%	7%	6% (Note: Bennet, de Blasio, Delaney, Klobuchar, O'Rourke, and Swalwell with 1%; Bullock, Hickenlooper, Williamson, and Yang with 0%)	21%

== Results ==
Results by county Biden—60–70% Biden—70–80% Biden—80–90%

2020 Mississippi Democratic presidential primary
Candidate	Votes	%	Delegates
Joe Biden	222,160	80.96	34
Bernie Sanders	40,657	14.82	2
Michael Bloomberg (withdrawn)	6,933	2.53	
Elizabeth Warren (withdrawn)	1,550	0.56	
Tulsi Gabbard	1,003	0.37	
Pete Buttigieg (withdrawn)	562	0.20	
Andrew Yang (withdrawn)	450	0.16	
Amy Klobuchar (withdrawn)	440	0.16	
Tom Steyer (withdrawn)	378	0.14	
Deval Patrick (withdrawn)	258	0.09	
Total	274,391	100%	36

=== Results by county ===
2020 Mississippi Democratic primary (results per county)
County	Joe Biden		Bernie Sanders		Michael Bloomberg		Elizabeth Warren		Tulsi Gabbard		Pete Buttigieg		Andrew Yang		Amy Klobuchar		Tom Steyer		Deval Patrick		Total votes cast
County	Votes	%	Votes	%	Votes	%	Votes	%	Votes	%	Votes	%	Votes	%	Votes	%	Votes	%	Votes	%	Total votes cast
Adams	3,447	82.82	502	12.06	146	3.51	15	0.36	19	0.46	8	0.19	8	0.19	8	0.19	5	0.12	4	0.10	4,162
Alcorn	1,036	79.39	209	16.02	30	2.30	4	0.31	11	0.84	3	0.23	1	0.08	5	0.38	3	0.23	3	0.23	1,305
Amite	1,240	83.90	166	11.23	40	2.71	4	0.27	5	0.34	3	0.20	5	0.34	5	0.34	6	0.41	4	0.27	1,478
Attala	1,609	80.29	308	15.37	55	2.74	10	0.50	11	0.55	2	0.10	5	0.25	0	0.00	3	0.15	1	0.05	2,004
Benton	531	78.09	86	12.65	42	6.18	4	0.59	2	0.29	5	0.74	3	0.44	1	0.15	5	0.74	1	0.15	680
Bolivar	3,799	83.31	580	12.72	109	2.39	26	0.57	17	0.37	8	0.18	9	0.20	5	0.11	5	0.11	2	0.04	4,560
Calhoun	730	80.04	129	14.14	29	3.18	12	1.32	2	0.22	1	0.11	2	0.22	4	0.44	2	0.22	1	0.11	912
Carroll	791	79.18	138	13.81	50	5.01	3	0.30	7	0.70	2	0.20	4	0.40	1	0.10	2	0.20	1	0.10	999
Chickasaw	1,612	83.52	218	11.30	65	3.37	7	0.36	8	0.41	7	0.36	0	0.00	5	0.26	7	0.36	1	0.05	1,930
Choctaw	519	80.59	74	11.49	32	4.97	3	0.47	7	1.09	1	0.16	3	0.47	3	0.47	0	0.00	2	0.31	644
Claiborne	1,495	80.72	239	12.90	82	4.43	8	0.43	6	0.32	8	0.43	4	0.22	4	0.22	3	0.16	3	0.16	1,852
Clarke	1,305	86.48	124	8.22	56	3.71	9	0.60	3	0.20	3	0.20	5	0.33	3	0.20	1	0.07	0	0.00	1,509
Clay	2,751	85.97	278	8.69	118	3.69	20	0.63	15	0.47	10	0.31	1	0.03	3	0.09	1	0.03	3	0.09	3,200
Coahoma	2,452	76.91	478	14.99	102	3.20	37	1.16	40	1.25	7	0.22	28	0.88	19	0.60	17	0.53	8	0.25	3,188
Copiah	3,068	76.83	721	18.06	139	3.48	17	0.43	16	0.40	4	0.10	10	0.25	5	0.13	6	0.15	7	0.18	3,993
Covington	1,528	85.41	185	10.34	52	2.91	6	0.34	4	0.22	5	0.28	2	0.11	2	0.11	1	0.06	4	0.22	1,789
DeSoto	8,622	77.29	2,202	19.74	163	1.46	75	0.67	31	0.28	20	0.18	10	0.09	19	0.17	11	0.10	2	0.02	11,155
Forrest	4,876	74.04	1,405	21.33	183	2.78	58	0.88	22	0.33	11	0.17	11	0.17	6	0.09	6	0.09	8	0.12	6,586
Franklin	624	75.54	155	18.77	40	4.84	2	0.24	1	0.12	2	0.24	1	0.12	0	0.00	0	0.00	1	0.12	826
George	425	75.62	105	18.68	18	3.20	6	1.07	0	0.00	2	0.36	2	0.36	2	0.36	2	0.36	0	0.00	562
Greene	376	85.65	38	8.66	15	3.42	1	0.23	1	0.23	3	0.68	1	0.23	1	0.23	2	0.46	1	0.23	439
Grenada	1,927	82.95	230	9.90	103	4.43	13	0.56	16	0.69	5	0.22	6	0.26	14	0.60	5	0.22	4	0.17	2,323
Hancock	1,421	68.22	543	26.07	34	1.63	26	1.25	28	1.34	13	0.62	4	0.19	11	0.53	2	0.10	1	0.05	2,083
Harrison	9,808	77.14	2,457	19.32	244	1.92	82	0.64	45	0.35	30	0.24	17	0.13	15	0.12	11	0.09	6	0.05	12,715
Hinds	36,523	83.15	6,291	14.32	549	1.25	211	0.48	134	0.31	54	0.12	54	0.12	46	0.10	36	0.08	26	0.06	43,924
Holmes	3,253	83.05	478	12.20	130	3.32	10	0.26	6	0.15	12	0.31	7	0.18	6	0.15	7	0.18	8	0.20	3,917
Humphreys	1,520	81.50	213	11.42	90	4.83	8	0.43	10	0.54	7	0.38	5	0.27	6	0.32	5	0.27	1	0.05	1,865
Issaquena	172	78.54	28	12.79	14	6.39	1	0.46	1	0.46	0	0.00	1	0.46	1	0.46	1	0.46	0	0.00	219
Itawamba	467	74.60	135	21.57	10	1.60	1	0.16	6	0.96	3	0.48	2	0.32	0	0.00	0	0.00	2	0.32	626
Jackson	6,711	79.50	1,453	17.21	142	1.68	52	0.62	30	0.36	21	0.25	12	0.14	14	0.17	5	0.06	2	0.02	8,442
Jasper	2,121	85.28	236	9.49	93	3.74	7	0.28	5	0.20	9	0.36	2	0.08	6	0.24	5	0.20	3	0.12	2,487
Jefferson	1,845	83.52	255	11.54	76	3.44	8	0.36	8	0.36	6	0.27	4	0.18	0	0.00	5	0.23	2	0.09	2,209
Jefferson Davis	1,404	81.16	242	13.99	62	3.58	6	0.35	5	0.29	3	0.17	2	0.12	0	0.00	3	0.17	3	0.17	1,730
Jones	3,563	83.48	552	12.93	106	2.48	14	0.33	6	0.14	7	0.16	6	0.14	4	0.09	5	0.12	5	0.12	4,268
Kemper	1,250	86.33	124	8.56	53	3.66	3	0.21	4	0.28	2	0.14	3	0.21	2	0.14	3	0.21	4	0.28	1,448
Lafayette	3,049	67.14	1,228	27.04	90	1.98	99	2.18	28	0.62	18	0.40	7	0.15	13	0.29	6	0.13	3	0.07	4,541
Lamar	2,480	74.45	702	21.07	78	2.34	19	0.57	18	0.54	11	0.33	9	0.27	11	0.33	3	0.09	0	0.00	3,331
Lauderdale	5,218	86.30	611	10.11	153	2.53	17	0.28	12	0.20	7	0.12	7	0.12	9	0.15	4	0.07	8	0.13	6,046
Lawrence	1,148	82.89	161	11.62	50	3.61	9	0.65	4	0.29	4	0.29	1	0.07	2	0.14	1	0.07	5	0.36	1,385
Leake	1,742	80.09	339	15.59	65	2.99	11	0.51	5	0.23	2	0.09	1	0.05	1	0.05	7	0.32	2	0.09	2,175
Lee	4,471	79.34	957	16.98	130	2.31	38	0.67	14	0.25	7	0.12	9	0.16	5	0.09	2	0.04	2	0.04	5,635
LeFlore	2,857	87.72	284	8.72	79	2.43	13	0.40	3	0.09	8	0.25	3	0.09	3	0.09	7	0.21	0	0.00	3,257
Lincoln	2,129	79.53	423	15.80	87	3.25	11	0.41	7	0.26	10	0.37	0	0.00	1	0.04	4	0.15	5	0.19	2,677
Lowndes	5,011	85.03	717	12.17	106	1.80	25	0.42	11	0.19	7	0.12	7	0.12	2	0.03	6	0.10	1	0.02	5,893
Madison	10,849	82.09	2,002	15.15	180	1.36	72	0.54	41	0.31	24	0.18	13	0.10	11	0.08	17	0.13	7	0.05	13,216
Marion	1,728	85.12	219	10.79	67	3.30	6	0.30	2	0.10	3	0.15	1	0.05	1	0.05	3	0.15	0	0.00	2,030
Marshall	3,343	82.79	486	12.04	146	3.62	19	0.47	13	0.32	4	0.10	9	0.22	8	0.20	8	0.20	2	0.05	4,038
Monroe	2,419	84.61	309	10.81	80	2.80	20	0.70	13	0.45	2	0.07	7	0.24	5	0.17	1	0.03	3	0.10	2,859
Montgomery	937	77.25	164	13.52	81	6.68	9	0.74	3	0.25	6	0.49	3	0.25	8	0.66	0	0.00	2	0.16	1,213
Neshoba	1,213	82.13	203	13.74	35	2.37	11	0.74	4	0.27	3	0.20	5	0.34	2	0.14	1	0.07	0	0.00	1,477
Newton	1,338	84.90	172	10.91	54	3.43	3	0.19	1	0.06	0	0.00	0	0.00	3	0.19	2	0.13	3	0.19	1,576
Noxubee	1,551	84.20	185	10.04	77	4.18	7	0.38	6	0.33	9	0.49	3	0.16	1	0.05	0	0.00	3	0.16	1,842
Oktibbeha	3,564	74.22	971	20.22	136	2.83	56	1.17	25	0.52	18	0.37	13	0.27	14	0.29	5	0.10	0	0.00	4,802
Panola	3,084	82.37	429	11.46	158	4.22	19	0.51	11	0.29	6	0.16	8	0.21	9	0.24	16	0.43	4	0.11	3,744
Pearl River	1,240	74.16	353	21.11	30	1.79	14	0.84	15	0.90	5	0.30	5	0.30	2	0.12	5	0.30	3	0.18	1,672
Perry	536	80.84	83	12.52	36	5.43	0	0.00	0	0.00	0	0.00	2	0.30	2	0.30	2	0.30	2	0.30	663
Pike	3,471	81.69	570	13.41	132	3.11	24	0.56	13	0.31	15	0.35	5	0.12	5	0.12	6	0.14	8	0.19	4,249
Pontotoc	957	76.13	224	17.82	38	3.02	8	0.64	11	0.88	8	0.64	2	0.16	3	0.24	4	0.32	2	0.16	1,257
Prentiss	899	81.14	148	13.36	24	2.17	12	1.08	9	0.81	5	0.45	3	0.27	5	0.45	1	0.09	2	0.18	1,108
Quitman	911	79.36	139	12.11	63	5.49	7	0.61	3	0.26	1	0.09	8	0.70	5	0.44	7	0.61	4	0.35	1,148
Rankin	7,611	79.34	1,745	18.19	115	1.20	38	0.40	37	0.39	15	0.16	11	0.11	11	0.11	8	0.08	2	0.02	9,593
Scott	2,156	81.98	344	13.08	76	2.89	15	0.57	7	0.27	3	0.11	5	0.19	1	0.04	11	0.42	12	0.46	2,630
Sharkey	767	82.65	107	11.53	37	3.99	4	0.43	5	0.54	2	0.22	2	0.22	2	0.22	1	0.11	1	0.11	928
Simpson	1,940	82.20	331	14.03	56	2.37	12	0.51	6	0.25	3	0.13	2	0.08	2	0.08	3	0.13	5	0.21	2,360
Smith	794	81.19	128	13.09	41	4.19	5	0.51	3	0.31	2	0.20	1	0.10	2	0.20	2	0.20	0	0.00	978
Stone	680	79.91	135	15.86	23	2.70	3	0.35	1	0.12	1	0.12	2	0.24	1	0.12	3	0.35	2	0.24	851
Sunflower	2,754	82.83	385	11.58	119	3.58	15	0.45	22	0.66	6	0.18	2	0.06	10	0.30	7	0.21	5	0.15	3,325
Tallahatchie	1,368	78.89	213	12.28	99	5.71	11	0.63	14	0.81	5	0.29	8	0.46	7	0.40	5	0.29	4	0.23	1,734
Tate	1,455	80.08	263	14.47	63	3.47	12	0.66	7	0.39	0	0.00	1	0.06	11	0.61	3	0.17	2	0.11	1,817
Tippah	683	80.54	119	14.03	28	3.30	7	0.83	1	0.12	5	0.59	1	0.12	0	0.00	2	0.24	2	0.24	848
Tishomingo	406	71.10	134	23.47	12	2.10	5	0.88	4	0.70	1	0.18	4	0.70	3	0.53	2	0.35	0	0.00	571
Tunica	789	80.76	135	13.82	36	3.68	4	0.41	4	0.41	4	0.41	0	0.00	1	0.10	1	0.10	3	0.31	977
Union	757	77.01	171	17.40	40	4.07	2	0.20	7	0.71	2	0.20	2	0.20	1	0.10	1	0.10	0	0.00	983
Walthall	1,205	84.80	144	10.13	49	3.45	8	0.56	5	0.35	3	0.21	2	0.14	2	0.14	2	0.14	1	0.07	1,421
Warren	4,408	81.25	809	14.91	116	2.14	34	0.63	28	0.52	12	0.22	10	0.18	3	0.06	2	0.04	3	0.06	5,425
Washington	4,801	85.53	584	10.40	171	3.05	16	0.29	21	0.37	4	0.07	5	0.09	6	0.11	3	0.05	2	0.04	5,613
Wayne	1,689	83.49	211	10.43	87	4.30	11	0.54	4	0.20	7	0.35	4	0.20	4	0.20	2	0.10	4	0.20	2,023
Webster	451	79.54	73	12.87	26	4.59	2	0.35	3	0.53	3	0.53	2	0.35	3	0.53	0	0.00	4	0.71	567
Wilkinson	1,039	83.39	141	11.32	42	3.37	11	0.88	0	0.00	2	0.16	3	0.24	3	0.24	4	0.32	1	0.08	1,246
Winston	1,802	84.32	223	10.44	76	3.56	13	0.61	5	0.23	2	0.09	5	0.23	4	0.19	6	0.28	1	0.05	2,137
Yalobusha	1,238	78.55	226	14.34	71	4.51	6	0.38	9	0.57	3	0.19	5	0.32	5	0.32	6	0.38	7	0.44	1,576
Yazoo	2,401	82.09	380	12.99	103	3.52	18	0.62	6	0.21	7	0.24	2	0.07	1	0.03	5	0.17	2	0.07	2,925
Total	222,160	80.96	40,657	14.82	6,933	2.53	1,550	0.56	1,003	0.37	562	0.20	450	0.16	440	0.16	378	0.14	258	0.09	274,391

== See also ==
- 2020 Mississippi Republican presidential primary

== Notes ==
Additional candidates
