= Andy Gipson =

American politician (born 1976)

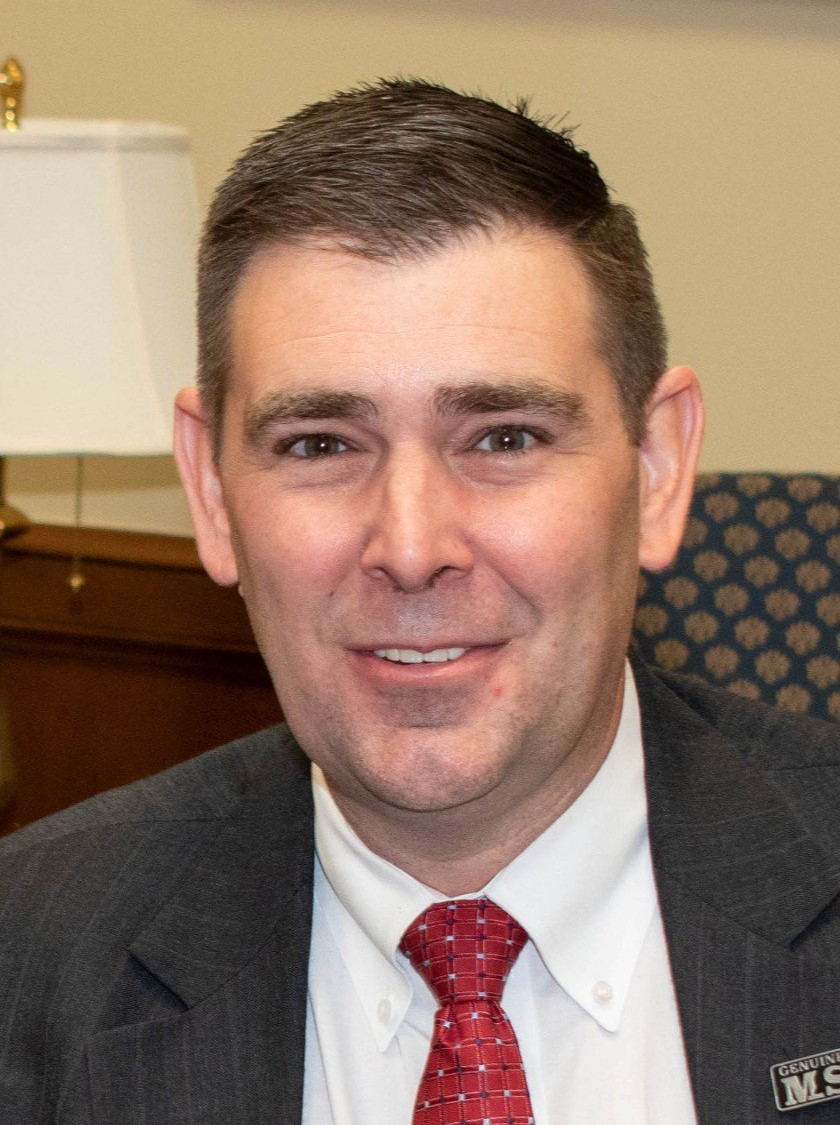
- Gipson in 2019

8th Agriculture and Commerce Commissioner of Mississippi
- Incumbent
- Assumed office April 2, 2018
- Governor: Phil Bryant; Tate Reeves
- Preceded by: Cindy Hyde-Smith

Member of the Mississippi House of Representatives from the 77th district
- In office January 8, 2008 – April 2, 2018
- Preceded by: Clint Rotenberry
- Succeeded by: Price Wallace

Personal details
- Born: James Andrew Gipson; December 21, 1976 (age 49) Flowood, Mississippi, U.S.
- Party: Republican
- Spouse: Leslie Gipson
- Education: Mississippi College (BA, JD)

James Andrew Gipson (born December 21, 1976) is an American attorney and politician who has served as the Mississippi Agriculture and Commerce Commissioner since 2018. A member of the Republican Party, Gipson was appointed to the position by Governor Phil Bryant, succeeding Cindy Hyde-Smith, who was appointed to serve in the U.S. Senate. He was elected to a full term in 2019 with 59% of the vote and won reelection in 2023 with 58% of the vote.

Gipson served in the Mississippi House of Representatives for the 77th district from 2008 to 2018. During his tenure, he was known as one of the most socially conservative representatives, supporting bills against gun control, championing legislation to prohibit discrimination based on beliefs about marriage, and authoring a restrictive abortion ban. Gipson also worked on criminal justice reform, seeking to reduce repeat offenders, abolish debtor prisons, and study sentencing disparities. As Agriculture Commissioner, Gipson has visited all 82 counties in Mississippi, created a branding initiative for Mississippi products, increased agency-county correspondence, and developed a workforce development program. He has come out against Medicaid expansion, in vitro fertilization, and medical marijuana while serving in his role.

A native of Flowood, Mississippi, he owns a family farm and works as a lawyer. He is an alumnus of Mississippi College, earning a bachelor's degree and Juris Doctor.

== Early life and education ==
Gipson was born on December 21, 1976 in Flowood, Mississippi.

He graduated with a bachelor's degree in political science at Mississippi College in 1999 and earned his Juris Doctor at Mississippi College School of Law in 2002, graduating first in his class. While in law school, he was the editor-in-chief of the Mississippi College Law Review. Gipson currently works in private law practice at Jones Walker LLP, where he specialized in securities, banking, communications and insurance. He continues to work at the practice while commissioner.

He is married to Leslie Gipson and has four children. He lives on a farm in Braxton, Mississippi. He is an ordained minister and works as a pastor.

== Political career ==
=== State Representative ===
A Republican, Gipson was elected to the Mississippi House of Representatives for the 77th district in 2007, besting Democratic challenger Dale Berry 58% to 40%. He took office in 2008, and served until 2018. While in the house, he served as chairman of the Judiciary B committee from 2012 to 2018 and the Ethics committee from 2016 to 2018. He also served on the House Agriculture, Appropriations, Ways and Means, County Affairs, Insurance, Municipalities, and Transportation committees.

In the House, he was considered one of the most socially conservative representatives. He supported bills against gun control and worked to allow individuals to more easily sue government agencies for gun bans or other policies believed to infringe on gun rights. He expressed desire to make Mississippi a "constitutional carry" state to allow open or concealed carry without a permit. He authored a bill banning abortion after 15 weeks, the nation's most restrictive abortion ban at the time. As committee chair, he killed a bill that would have made domestic violence grounds for divorce, though he later allowed a bill to pass after public pressure. He championed legislation that would prohibit discrimination against anyone whose belief is that marriage is between a man and woman. He worked to pass criminal justice reform by granting greater discretion to judges and expanding the use of drug courts, as well as legislation that sought to reduce repeat offenders, abolish debtor prisons, and study sentencing disparities. He opposed Medicaid expansion.

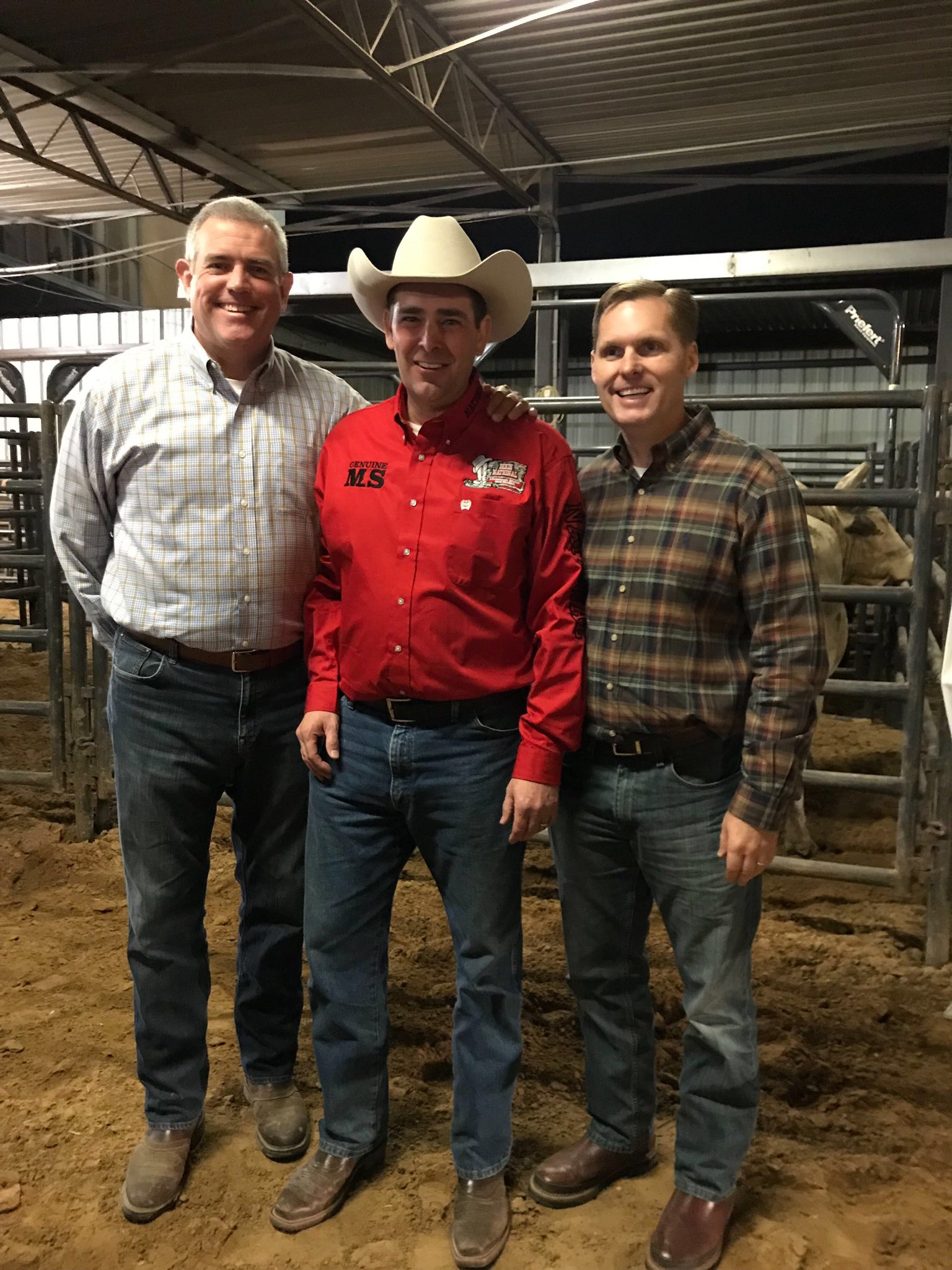
Andy Gipson with former Speaker of the House Phillip Gunn and U.S. House Rep. Michael Guest.

=== Agriculture Commissioner ===
On March 29, 2018, Governor Phil Bryant announced that he would appoint Gipson to the office of Mississippi Agriculture and Commerce Commissioner, succeeding Cindy Hyde-Smith, who was appointed by Bryant to serve in the U.S. Senate to fill the vacancy left by Thad Cochran. He was sworn in on April 2 to complete Hyde-Smith's uncompleted term.

In the 2019 Mississippi elections, he was elected with 59% to 41% of the vote against Democrat Rickey Cole. He ran for reelection in 2023 and touted accomplishments of government consolidation within the agency, help grow international markets, and fought regulatory restrictions. He won 58% to 42%.

Gipson has been an advocate for ending foreign ownership of Mississippi farmland.

As commissioner, he has visited all 82 counties, created a branding initiative for domestically grown products, created a county correspondent program to allow easier access to agency officials, and created a workforce development program to connect individuals to agricultural internships.

He made statements against in vitro fertilization, calling it “the greatest assault on the cause of life that we’ve seen in Mississippi in a long time.” He has maintained his opposition to Medicaid expansion. He was against involving his agency in medical marijuana legalization.

Party political offices
Preceded by Cindy Hyde-Smith	Republican nominee for Agriculture and Commerce Commissioner of Mississippi; 2019, 2023	Most recent
Political offices
Preceded by Cindy Hyde-Smith	Agriculture and Commerce Commissioner of Mississippi; 2018–present	Incumbent
