= Gautier, Mississippi =

- City
- Flag Seal Logo

- Location of Gautier, Mississippi

- Location in the United States
- Coordinates: 30°22′54″N 88°38′39″W
- Country: United States
- State: Mississippi
- County: Jackson

Government
  - Mayor: Casey Vaughan (I)

Area
  - Total: 32.12 sq mi (83.20 km^{2})
  - Land: 30.26 sq mi (78.37 km^{2})
  - Water: 1.86 sq mi (4.83 km^{2})
- Elevation: 6.6 ft (2 m)

Population (2020)
  - Total: 19,024
  - Density: 628.7/sq mi (242.76/km^{2})
- Time zone: UTC−6 (Central (CST))
  - Summer (DST): UTC−5 (CDT)
- ZIP code: 39553
- Area code: 228
- FIPS code: 28-26860
- GNIS feature ID: 0670341
- Website: www.gautier-ms.gov

Gautier (/ˈɡoʊʃeɪ/ GOH-SHAY) is a city in Jackson County, Mississippi, United States, along the Gulf of Mexico west of Pascagoula. It is part of the Pascagoula Metropolitan Statistical Area. As of the 2020 census, Gautier had a population of 19,024. In 2002, Gautier had annexed land more than doubling its area.

Gautier is a bedroom resort community surrounded by bayous and wetlands on three sides. The natural environment of Gautier offers many opportunities for recreation and eco-tourism. The Gulf Coast region, of which Gautier is a part, has been considered a relatively high growth area of the state; however, the loss of houses and jobs after Hurricane Katrina on August 29, 2005, led to outmigration in 2006.

== History ==
The town takes its name from the Gautier family that originated in Lyon, France. Fernando Upton Gautier (1822–1891) was born on a cargo ship as his parents were emigrating to New Orleans. In 1867, Gautier established a spacious homestead at the mouth of the Pascagoula River, which still stands. He established a lucrative sawmill business in the area, and the town grew up from it. The home, known by locals as "The Old Place", is owned by the descendants of Fernando Upton Gautier and his wife, Theresa Fayard Gautier (1828–1911), and is used for private and public events.

The Eric Clark Coastal Preserve is a 900 acres (360 ha) protected coastal land preserve with hiking areas in Gautier. It was established in 2023.

== Geography ==
Gautier is located in southern Jackson County along Mississippi Sound of the Gulf of Mexico, at the mouth of the West Pascagoula River, locally known as the "Singing River". The city is bordered to the east by the city of Pascagoula (the Jackson county seat) and to the west by Ocean Springs, and to the north by unincorporated Vancleave.

U.S. Route 90 passes through the center of Gautier, leading east 4 miles (6 km) into Pascagoula and 13 miles (21 km) to Ocean Springs. Interstate 10 passes through the northern part of the city limits, with access from Exit 57 (Mississippi Highway 57) and Exit 61 (Gautier Vancleave Road). I-10 leads west 30 miles (48 km) to the Gulfport area and east 42 miles (68 km) to Mobile, Alabama.

According to the United States Census Bureau, the city of Gautier has a total area of 32.1 square miles (83.2 km^{2}), of which 30.2 square miles (78.3 km^{2}) are land and 1.9 square miles (4.9 km^{2}), or 5.90%, are water.

== Demographics ==
Historical population
Census	Pop.	Note	%±
1970	2,087		—
1980	8,917		327.3%
1990	10,088		13.1%
2000	11,681		15.8%
2010	18,572		59.0%
2020	19,024		2.4%
U.S. Decennial Census

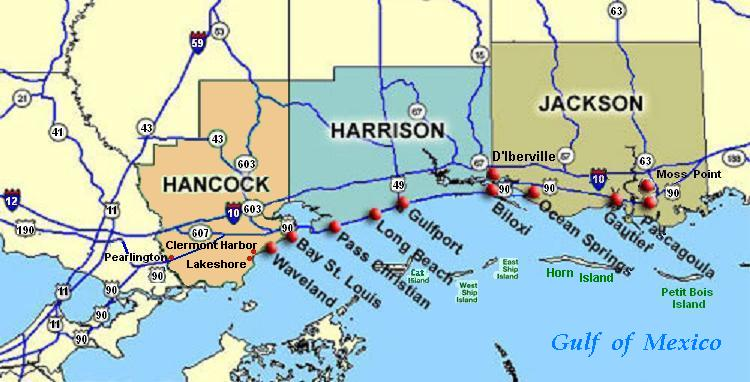
Gautier (right center) is east of Ocean Springs and west of Pascagoula, off U.S. Route 90, along the Gulf of Mexico.

=== Racial and ethnic composition ===
Gautier city, Mississippi – Racial and ethnic composition Note: the US Census treats Hispanic/Latino as an ethnic category. This table excludes Latinos from the racial categories and assigns them to a separate category. Hispanics/Latinos may be of any race.
Race / Ethnicity (NH = Non-Hispanic)	Pop 2000	Pop 2010	Pop 2020	% 2000	% 2010	% 2020
White alone (NH)	7,733	10,866	10,084	66.20%	58.51%	53.01%
Black or African American alone (NH)	3,213	5,976	5,828	27.51%	32.18%	30.63%
Native American or Alaska Native alone (NH)	56	98	105	0.48%	0.53%	0.55%
Asian alone (NH)	142	272	268	1.22%	1.46%	1.41%
Native Hawaiian or Pacific Islander alone (NH)	5	8	23	0.04%	0.04%	0.12%
Other race alone (NH)	15	21	60	0.13%	0.11%	0.32%
Mixed race or Multiracial (NH)	144	341	784	1.23%	1.84%	4.12%
Hispanic or Latino (any race)	373	990	1,872	3.19%	5.33%	9.84%
Total	11,681	18,572	19,024	100.00%	100.00%	100.00%

=== 2020 census ===
As of the 2020 census, Gautier had a population of 19,024 and 7,543 households, including 4,577 families. The median age was 38.4 years. 24.4% of residents were under the age of 18 and 15.8% of residents were 65 years of age or older. For every 100 females there were 92.4 males, and for every 100 females age 18 and over there were 88.6 males age 18 and over.

80.6% of residents lived in urban areas, while 19.4% lived in rural areas.

There were 7,543 households in Gautier, of which 33.7% had children under the age of 18 living in them. Of all households, 41.4% were married-couple households, 19.1% were households with a male householder and no spouse or partner present, and 32.4% were households with a female householder and no spouse or partner present. About 26.9% of all households were made up of individuals and 10.2% had someone living alone who was 65 years of age or older.

There were 8,307 housing units, of which 9.2% were vacant. The homeowner vacancy rate was 2.3% and the rental vacancy rate was 10.3%.

== Government ==
The city of Gautier has had a City Manager-Council organizational structure since 1987. Although Hurricane Katrina on August 29, 2005, slowed growth, the population of Gautier is expected to grow at a steady rate during the coming decades. The socio-economic demographics of the city is similar to that of Jackson County in terms of income, age, gender and education, although Gautier has a higher rate of college-educated persons. The income and employment of residents benefits greatly from the proximity of strong employment centers in Jackson County.

== Education ==
Most of Gautier is served by the Pascagoula-Gautier School District. Portions are in the Jackson County School District and in the Ocean Springs School District.

The main secondary school in the city, of the Pascagoula-Gautier district, is Gautier High School, whose doors opened in 1996 and which was awarded blue ribbon status by the Department of Education in 2005. The city is also served by Gautier Middle School, Singing River Academy, and three elementary schools.

The Jackson County Campus of Mississippi Gulf Coast Community College is located in Gautier, as one of four campuses of the community college.

== Notable people ==
- Walter Inglis Anderson, painter and writer
- Mario Edwards Jr., professional football defensive end
- Aaron Jones, professional basketball player
- Margie Joseph, R&B, soul and gospel singer
- Kez McCorvey, former professional football player
- John Read, member of the Mississippi House of Representatives
