= Mississippi Department of Agriculture and Commerce =

Commissioner of Agriculture and Commerce of Mississippi
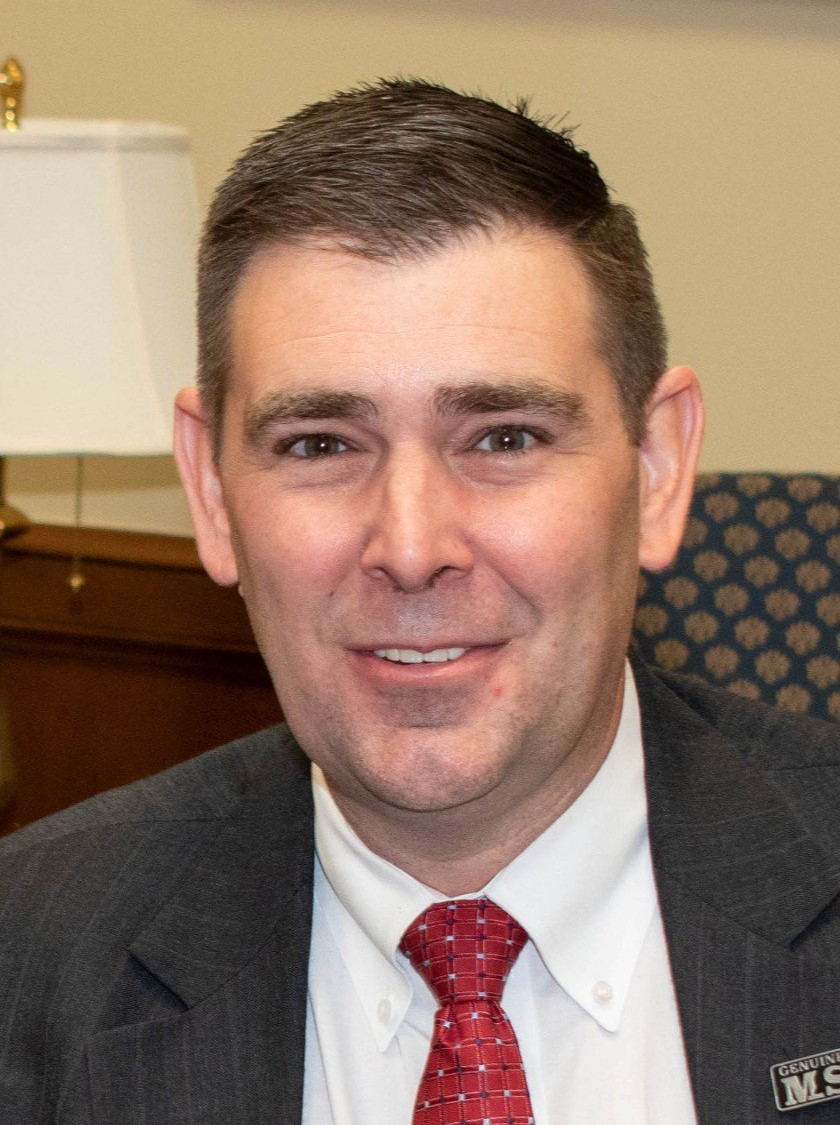
- Incumbent; Andy Gipson since March 29, 2018
- Term length: 4 years
- Formation: 1906
- First holder: Henry Edward Blakeslee
- Website: mdac.ms.gov

The Mississippi Department of Agriculture and Commerce abbreviates to MDAC. For all other references see MDAC.

The Mississippi Department of Agriculture and Commerce (also sometimes referred to as the MDAC) is a government department of Mississippi, headquartered in Jackson. MDAC regulates agricultural-related businesses within Mississippi, as well as promotes Mississippi products throughout the world. To fulfill these goals, the department was created by the Mississippi Legislature in 1906.

The Commissioner of MDAC is an elected office. The position is contested every four years at the same time as the gubernatorial election. The commissioner regulates agriculture and aquaculture in the state and promotes their products.

== Commissioners of Agriculture and Commerce, 1906–present ==
Agricultural Commissioners
No.	Agriculture Commissioner	Term in office	Party	Source
1	Henry Edward Blakeslee	1906 – 1916	Democratic	
2	Peter Parley Garner	1916 – 1928	Democratic	
3	J.C. Holton	1928 – 1940	Democratic	
4	Silas Corley	1940 – 1968	Democratic	
5	Jim Buck Ross	1968 – 1996	Democratic	
6	Lester Spell	1996 – 2012	Democratic (1996 – 2005)	
6	Lester Spell	1996 – 2012	Republican (2005 – 2012)	
7	Cindy Hyde-Smith	2012 – 2018	Republican	
8	Andy Gipson	2018 – present	Republican	
