= Dick Hall (Mississippi politician) =

Mississippi politician (1938–2022)

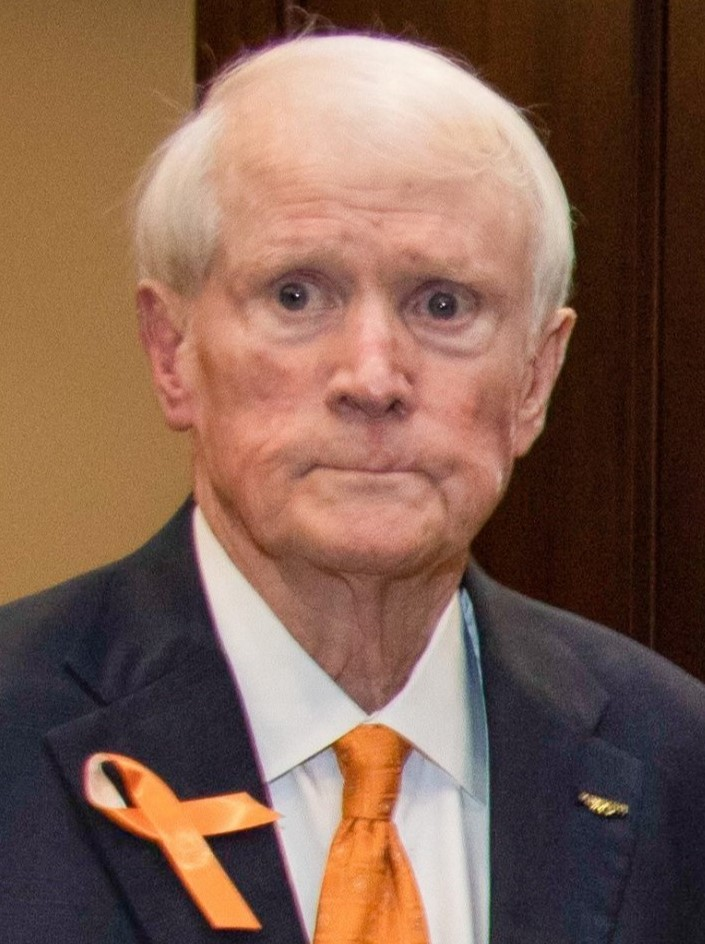

Member of the Mississippi Transportation Commission from the Northern district
- In office April 12, 1999 – January 7, 2020
- Preceded by: Wayne Burkes
- Succeeded by: Willie Lee Simmons

Member of the Mississippi Senate for the 25th district
- In office 1989–1999
- Preceded by: Con Maloney
- Succeeded by: J. Walter Michel

Member of the Mississippi House of Representatives from the 64th district
- In office 1979–1989
- Preceded by: Newly apportioned district
- Succeeded by: Bill Denny

Member of the Mississippi House of Representatives from the 31A district
- In office 1976–1979
- Succeeded by: District eliminated in redistricting

Personal details
- Born: Dick Hall; May 12, 1938 Vicksburg, Mississippi, U.S.
- Died: November 2, 2022 (aged 84) Jackson, Mississippi, U.S.
- Party: Democratic (1976–1983); Republican (1983–)
- Education: Mississippi State University (BS)

Dick Hall (May 12, 1938 – November 2, 2022) was a Mississippi politician who served on the Mississippi Transportation Commission for the Central District from 1999 to 2019, the longest tenure of any commissioner in state history. He also served in the Mississippi State Senate and Mississippi House of Representatives for three terms each. He was a Republican.

== Early life and education ==
Hall was born on May 12, 1938, in Vicksburg, Mississippi, but grew up in the Fondren area of Jackson, Mississippi. He graduated from Central High School in 1956 and attended Mississippi State University, where he received a Bachelor of Science in Business Administration in 1960. After college, he served as a Second Lieutenant in the United States Army Field Artillery. He worked in sales until becoming involved in real estate and investment with his own company.

== Career ==
Hall served a cumulative 24 years in the Mississippi Legislature. He was elected to the Mississippi House in 1975 for District 31A in Hinds County and took office in 1976 as a Democrat. Following reapportionment in the state to form only single-member districts in 1979, Hall represented District 64. In 1983, he switched to the Republican party; he was one of three Republicans in the 122-seat House. He chaired the Conservation Water Resources Committee and the Ways and Means Committee. In 1988, he was elected the Mississippi State Senate for District 25, succeeding Sen. Con Maloney; Hall served three consecutive terms. He chaired the Environmental Committee, the Public Health Committee and the Energy Committee. In the legislature, he helped pass legislation like the Education Reform Act of 1982, the 1987 Four-Lane Highway Program, the Budget Reform Act of 1992, and the Mental Health Reform Act of 1997.

Hall was appointed by Kirk Fordice to the Mississippi Transportation Commission on April 12, 1999, to fill an unexpired term from Wayne Burkes. He retired in 2020, making his total tenure 20 years and 9 months, the longest of any commissioner in state history. For 11 years of his tenure, he served as chairman of the commission.

== Personal life ==
Hall died November 2, 2022, at Baptist Rehabilitation Center in Jackson at 84 years old. He was married and had 3 children. He lived in the Brandon, Mississippi area.
