= Lester Spell =

American politician

- Spell in 2006

6th Mississippi Commissioner of Agriculture and Commerce
- In office January 9, 1996 – January 10, 2012
- Governor: Kirk Fordice; Ronnie Musgrove; Haley Barbour
- Preceded by: Jim Buck Ross
- Succeeded by: Cindy Hyde-Smith

Personal details
- Born: December 24, 1942 (age 83) Richland, Mississippi, U.S.
- Party: Republican (2005–present)
- Other political affiliations: Democratic (before 2005)

Lester Spell (born December 24, 1942) is an American politician who served as the Mississippi Commissioner of Agriculture and Commerce from 1996 to 2012.

Party political offices
Preceded by Jim Buck Ross	Democratic nominee for Agriculture and Commerce Commissioner of Mississippi; 1995, 1999, 2003	Succeeded by Rickey L. Cole
Preceded by Max Phillips	Republican nominee for Agriculture and Commerce Commissioner of Mississippi; 2007	Succeeded by Cindy Hyde-Smith
