= Eric Clark (politician) =

American politician and academic

34th Secretary of State of Mississippi
- In office January 4, 1996 – January 10, 2008
- Governor: Kirk Fordice; Ronnie Musgrove; Haley Barbour
- Preceded by: Dick Molpus
- Succeeded by: Delbert Hosemann

Member of the Mississippi House of Representatives from the 79th district 80th (1980-1984)
- In office January 1980 – January 16, 1996

Personal details
- Born: July 25, 1951 (age 75) Mize, Mississippi, U. S.
- Party: Democratic
- Education: Millsaps College (BA); University of Mississippi (MA); Mississippi State University (PhD)

Eric Charles Clark (born July 25, 1951) is an American politician and academic who served as the Secretary of State of Mississippi from 1996 to 2008.

== Early life and education ==
Eric Charles Clark was born on July 25, 1951, in Mize, Mississippi. Graduating from Taylorsville High School, he earned a Bachelor of Arts from Millsaps College, Master of Arts from the University of Mississippi, and PhD in history from Mississippi State University. His father, John Clark, served in the Mississippi House of Representatives in the 1940s.

== Career ==
Clark began his career as a high school and community college teacher. He was a history instructor at Mississippi College from 1989 to 1995. He was a member of the Mississippi House of Representatives, representing Smith, Scott, Covington, and Jones counties during four terms from 1980 to 1996. On January 3, 1984, he challenged the leadership of Speaker Buddie Newman by moving for the adoption of a set of House rules which unbundled some of the powers of the speakership. His proposal failed, but gained the support of 25 other representatives, leading to the collective label of the "Gang of 26". Newman responded to the challenge to his authority by assigning the 26 insignificant committee responsibilities.

In 1987, reformist legislators succeeded in curbing some of the powers of the speaker. Following Newman's replacement by Tim Ford in January 1988, Clark was made chairman of the House Rules Committee.

In 1995 Clark ran for the office of Secretary of State of Mississippi. He narrowly defeated Amy Tuck in the Democratic primary runoff and faced Republican state senator Barbara Blanton in the general election. He campaigned on his legislative record in the House of Representatives and defeated her in the November 7 contest. He was sworn in on January 4, 1996. He was re-elected in 1999 and 2003. He did not seek reelection in 2007 and was succeeded in office by Republican Delbert Hosemann on January 10, 2008. He served as the interim Speaker of the Mississippi House of Representatives at the opening of its 2008 session on January 8 to swear in the legislators before allowing the body to elect its own leadership.

In 2008 Clark was made executive director of the Mississippi Community College Board. He retired in June 2015.

He is the namesake of the Eric Clark Coastal Preserve, protected land and hiking trails established in 2023 in Gautier, Mississippi.

== Works cited ==
- 1982 Legislative Handbook. Jackson: Mississippi Legislature. 1980. OCLC 10993584.
- Nash, Jere; Taggart, Andy (2009). Mississippi Politics: The Struggle for Power, 1976-2008 (second ed.). University Press of Mississippi. ISBN 9781604733570.

Party political offices
Preceded by Dick Molpus	Democratic nominee for Secretary of State of Mississippi; 1995, 1999, 2003	Succeeded by Robert H. "Rob" Smith
