= 2027 United States attorney general elections =

- November 2, 2027; October 9 (Louisiana)

3 attorney general offices (Note: Seat tallies and popular vote do not include states that do not elect attorneys general or territorial attorneys general.)
	Majority party	Minority party
Party	Republican	Democratic
Seats up	3	0
- Republican incumbent Republican incumbent retiring No election

The 2027 United States attorney general elections are scheduled to be held on November 2, 2027, in the states of Kentucky and Mississippi, with an election occurring in Louisiana on October 9. The last regular attorney general elections for all three states were in 2023.

== Race summary ==
State	Attorney General	Party	First elected	Last race	Status	Candidates
Kentucky	Russell Coleman	Republican	2023	58.0% R	Incumbent running	▌Russell Coleman (Republican)
Louisiana	Liz Murrill	Republican	2023	66.4% R	Incumbent's intent unknown	TBD
Mississippi	Lynn Fitch	Republican	2019	58.1% R	Incumbent retiring to run for governor	▌Sean Tindell (Republican)

== Kentucky ==
Attorney General Russell Coleman was elected in 2023 with 58.01% of the vote. He is running for re-election for a second term.

== Louisiana ==
Attorney General Liz Murill was elected in 2023 with 66.37% of the vote. She is eligible to run for re-election but has not yet stated if she will do so.

== Mississippi ==
Attorney General Lynn Fitch was elected in 2023 with 58.07% of the vote. She was eligible to run for re-election but has instead announced a bid for governor. Mississippi Public Safety Commissioner Sean Tindell has announced his run for attorney general.
