= 2023 United States attorney general elections =

- November 7, 2023; November 18, 2023 (Louisiana)

3 attorney general offices 3 states (Note: Seat tallies and popular vote do not include states that do not elect attorneys general or territorial attorneys general.)
	Majority party	Minority party
Party	Republican	Democratic
Seats before	23	20
Seats after	23	20
Seat change	Steady	Steady
Popular vote	1,667,181	1,109,503
Percentage	60.05%	39.95%
Seats up	3	0
Seats won	3	0
- Republican hold No election

The 2023 United States attorney general elections were held on November 7, 2023, in the states of Kentucky and Mississippi, with an election held in Louisiana on November 18, to elect the attorneys general of three U.S. states. The previous elections for this group of states took place in 2019.

These elections took place concurrently with several other state and local elections.

Republicans won every seat in this election. All three states were won by Donald Trump in the 2020 presidential election.

== Election predictions ==
Several sites and individuals published predictions of competitive seats. These predictions looked at factors such as the strength of the incumbent (if the incumbent is running for re-election), the strength of the candidates, and the partisan leanings of the state (reflected in part by the state's Cook Partisan Voting Index rating). The predictions assigned ratings to each seat, with the rating indicating a party's predicted advantage in winning that seat.

Most election predictors use:

- "tossup": no advantage
- "tilt" (used by some predictors): advantage that is not quite as strong as "lean"
- "lean": slight advantage
- "likely": significant, but surmountable, advantage
- "safe": near-certain chance of victory

State	PVI	Incumbent	Last race	Sabato June 21, 2023	Result
Kentucky	R+16	Daniel Cameron (retiring)	57.7% R	Likely R	Coleman; 58.0% R
Louisiana	R+12	Jeff Landry (retiring)	66.2% R	Safe R	Murrill; 66.4% R
Mississippi	R+11	Lynn Fitch	57.8% R	Safe R	Fitch; 58.1% R

== Race summary ==
State	Attorney General	Party	First elected	Result	Candidates
Kentucky	Daniel Cameron	Republican	2019	Incumbent retired to run for governor of Kentucky; New attorney general elected Republican hold.	▌ ✓ Russell Coleman (Republican) 58.0%; ▌Pamela Stevenson (Democratic) 42.0%
Louisiana	Jeff Landry	Republican	2015	Incumbent retired to run for governor of Louisiana; New attorney general elected Republican hold.	▌ ✓ Liz Murrill (Republican) 66.4%; ▌Lindsey Cheek (Democratic) 33.6%
Mississippi	Lynn Fitch	Republican	2019	Incumbent re-elected	▌ ✓ Lynn Fitch (Republican) 58.1%; ▌Greta Martin (Democratic) 41.9%

== Kentucky ==
Kentucky Attorney General election
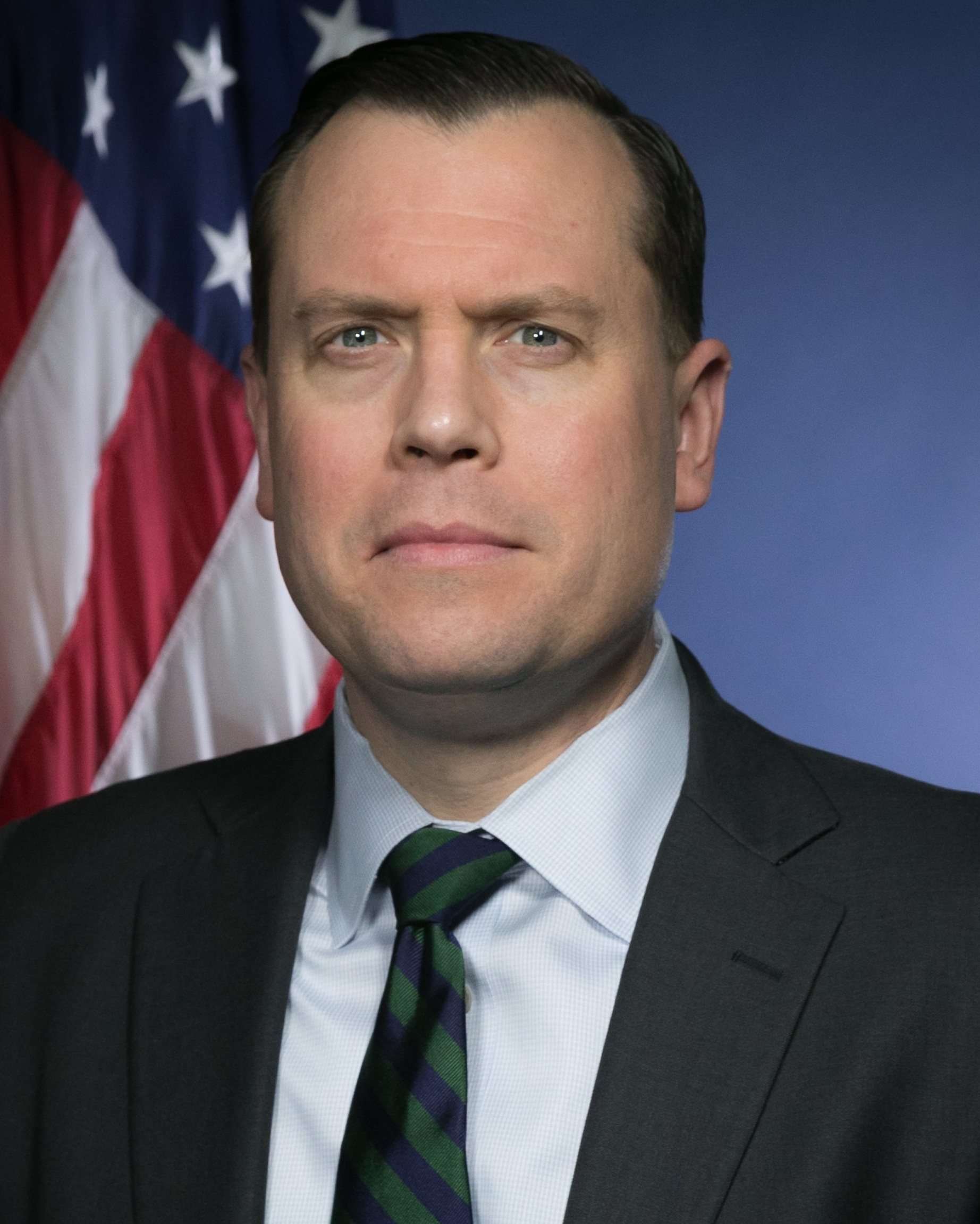

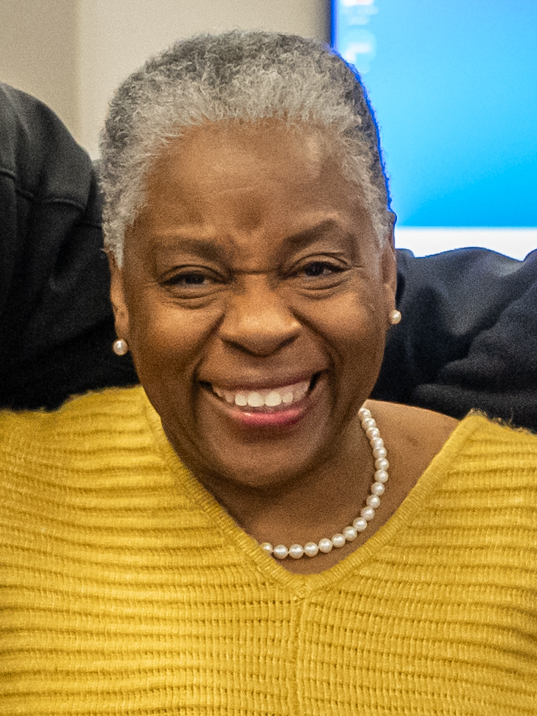
Nominee	Russell Coleman	Pamela Stevenson
Party	Republican	Democratic
Popular vote	752,230	544,544
Percentage	58.0%	42.0%
- County results Coleman: 50–60% 60–70% 70–80% 80–90% Stevenson: 50–60% 60–70%
Attorney General before election
Daniel Cameron
Republican
Elected Attorney General
Russell Coleman
Republican

Republican incumbent attorney general Daniel Cameron retired to run unsuccessfully for governor against Andy Beshear. Republican attorney Russell Coleman and Democratic state representative Pamela Stevenson won their respective nominations unopposed.

Coleman won the general election with 58% of the vote.

== Louisiana ==
Louisiana Attorney General election
- October 14, 2023 (first round); November 18, 2023 (runoff)
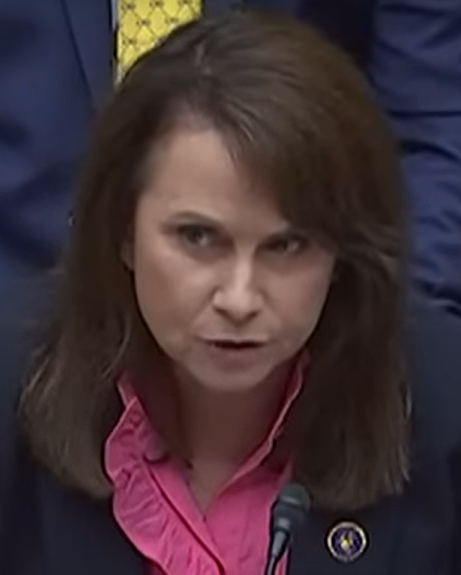

Candidate	Liz Murrill	Lindsey Cheek	John Stefanski
Party	Republican	Democratic	Republican
First round	463,103; 45.2%	239,652; 23.4%	172,300; 16.8%
Runoff	444,081; 66.4%	225,011; 33.6%	Eliminated
Candidate	Perry Walker Terrebonne	Marty Maley
Party	Democratic	Republican
First round	74,479; 7.3%	74,176; 7.3%
Runoff	Eliminated	Eliminated
- Murrill: 30–40% 40–50% 50–60% 60–70% 70–80% 80–90% >90% Cheek: 30–40% 40–50% 50–60% 60–70% 80–90% Stefanski: 50–60%
Attorney General before election
Jeff Landry
Republican
Elected Attorney General
Liz Murrill
Republican

The 2023 Louisiana Attorney General election was held on November 18, 2023 to elect the next attorney general of Louisiana, with the first round occurring on October 14. Incumbent Republican Attorney General Jeff Landry retired to successfully run for governor, leading to an open race. In the runoff, Louisiana Solicitor General Liz Murrill defeated attorney Lindsey Cheek by a margin of 33 percent.

Under Louisiana's two round system, all candidates appeared on the same ballot, regardless of party, and voters were allowed to vote for any candidate, regardless of their party affiliation.

== Mississippi ==
Mississippi Attorney General election
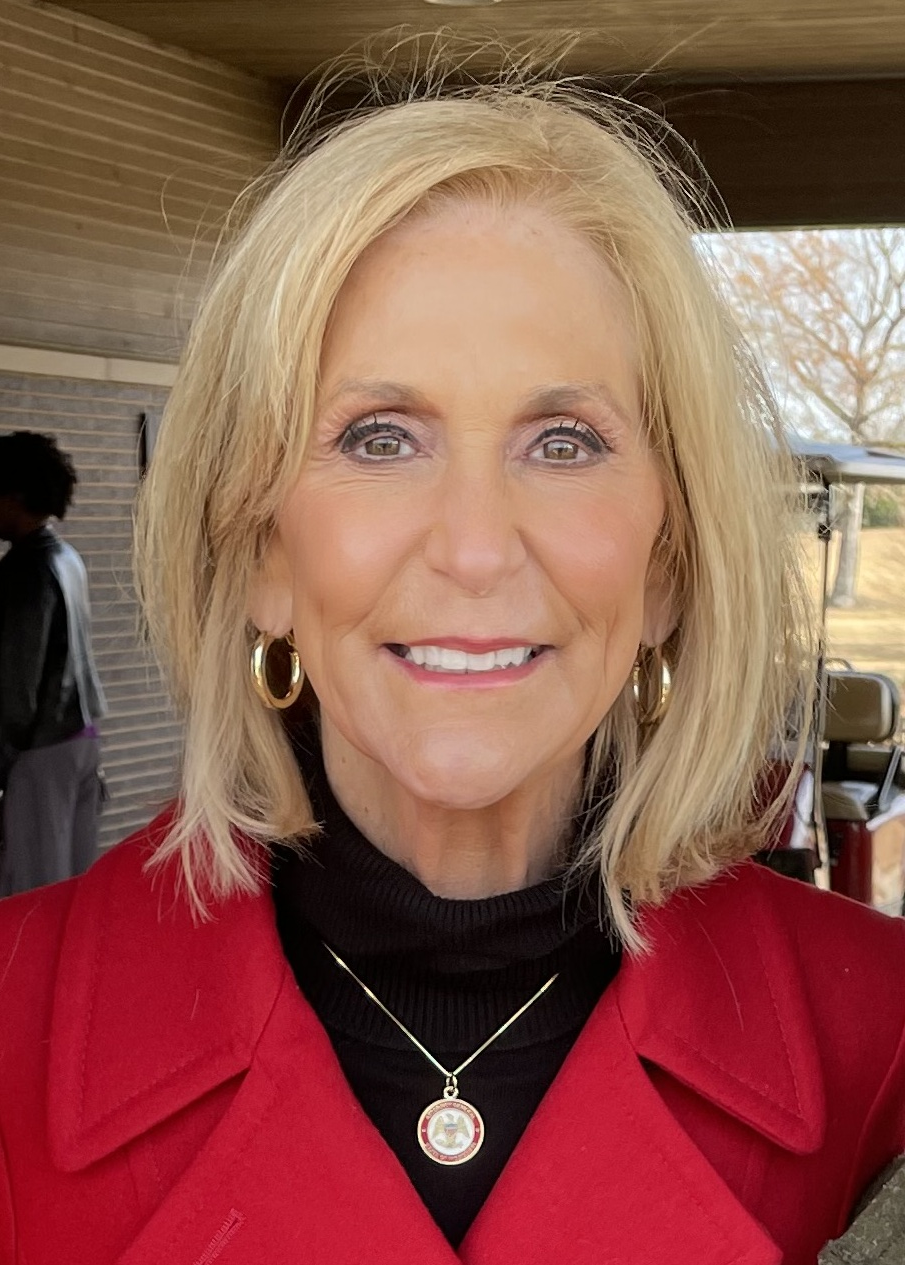

Nominee	Lynn Fitch	Greta Kemp Martin
Party	Republican	Democratic
Popular vote	470,870	339,948
Percentage	58.1%	41.9%
- County results Fitch: 50–60% 60–70% 70–80% 80–90% Martin: 50–60% 60–70% 70–80% 80–90%
Attorney General before election
Lynn Fitch
Republican
Elected Attorney General
Lynn Fitch
Republican

The 2023 Mississippi Attorney General election was held on November 7, 2023 to elect the next Attorney General of Mississippi. Incumbent Attorney General Lynn Fitch was elected in 2019 with 57.83% of the vote, becoming the state's first Republican Attorney General since 1878. Fitch ran for and won re-election.

Democratic Attorney and Disability Rights Mississippi Litigation Director Greta Kemp Martin ran to challenge Fitch.

== See also ==
- 2023 United States elections
