= 2019 United States attorney general elections =

- November 5, 2019; November 16, 2019 (Louisiana)

3 attorney general offices 3 states (Note: Seat tallies and popular vote do not include states that do not elect attorneys general or territorial attorneys general.)
	Majority party	Minority party
Party	Republican	Democratic
Seats before	20	23
Seats after	22	21
Seat change	▲2	▼2
Popular vote	2,167,410	1,390,786
Percentage	60.91%	39.09%
Seats up	1	2
Seats won	3	0
- Republican gain Republican hold No election

The 2019 United States attorney general elections were held primarily on November 5, 2019, in 3 states. The previous attorney general elections for this group of states took place in 2015. One state attorney general ran for reelection and won, while Democrat Jim Hood of Mississippi and Andy Beshear of Kentucky did not run for re-election to run for governor.

The elections took place concurrently with the 2019 House of Representatives elections, the 2019 gubernatorial elections, and numerous state and local elections.

Republicans won every seat in this election, with a net gain of two.

== Election predictions ==
Several sites and individuals published predictions of competitive seats. These predictions looked at factors such as the strength of the incumbent (if the incumbent is running for re-election), the strength of the candidates, and the partisan leanings of the state (reflected in part by the state's Cook Partisan Voting Index rating). The predictions assigned ratings to each seat, with the rating indicating the predicted advantage that a party has in winning that seat.

Most election predictors use:

- "tossup": no advantage
- "tilt" (used by some predictors): advantage that is not quite as strong as "lean"
- "lean": slight advantage
- "likely": significant, but surmountable, advantage
- "safe": near-certain chance of victory

State	PVI	Incumbent	Last race	Cook October 25, 2019	Result
Kentucky	R+15	Andy Beshear (retiring)	50.12% D	Lean R (flip)	Cameron (57.75%)
Louisiana	R+11	Jeff Landry	56.30% R	None	Landry (66.21%)
Mississippi	R+9	Jim Hood (retiring)	55.29% D	Likely R (flip)	Fitch (58.08%)

== Race summary ==
State	Attorney General	Party	First elected	Result	Candidates
Kentucky	Andy Beshear	Democratic	2015	Incumbent retired. New attorney general elected. Republican gain.	▌ ✓ Daniel Cameron (Republican) 57.7%; ▌ Greg Stumbo (Democratic) 42.3%
Louisiana	Jeff Landry	Republican	2015	Incumbent re-elected.	▌ ✓ Jeff Landry (Republican) 66.2%; ▌ Ike Jackson (Democratic) 33.8%
Mississippi	Jim Hood	Democratic	2003	Incumbent retired. New attorney general elected. Republican gain.	▌ ✓ Lynn Fitch (Republican) 57.8%; ▌ Jennifer R. Collins (Democratic) 42.2%

== Kentucky ==
2019 Kentucky Attorney General election
- November 5, 2019
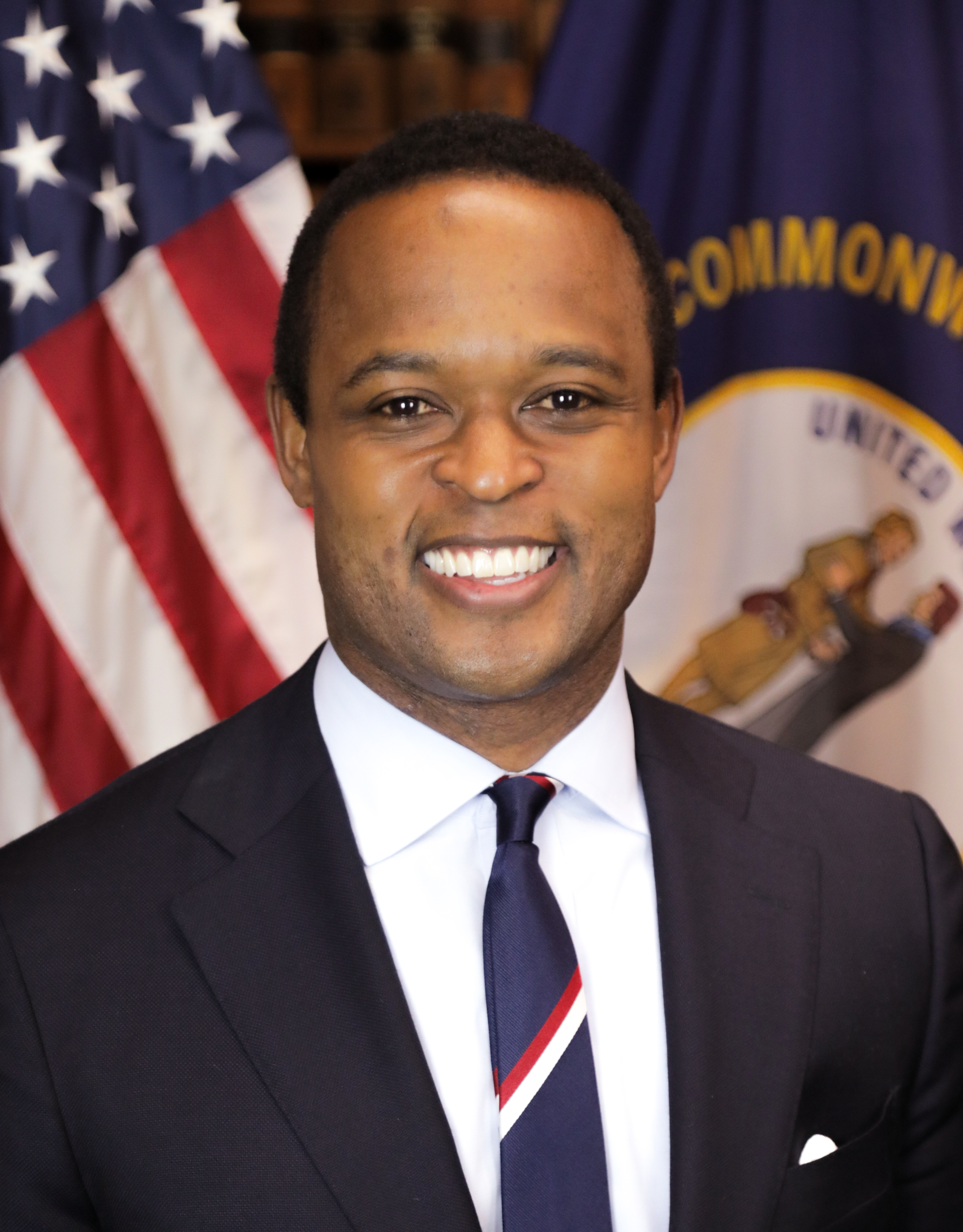

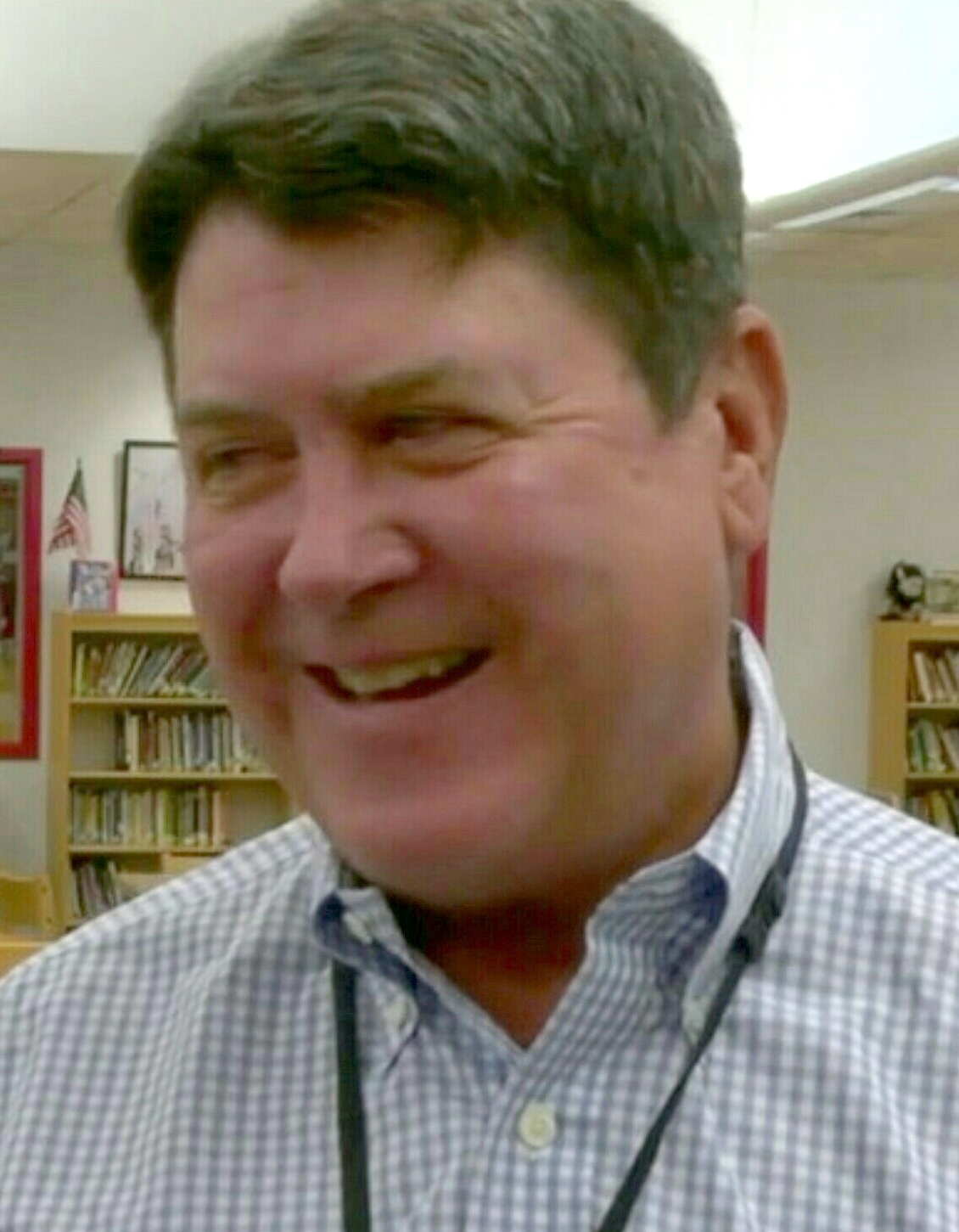
Nominee	Daniel Cameron	Greg Stumbo
Party	Republican	Democratic
Popular vote	823,343	602,218
Percentage	57.8%	42.2%
- County results Cameron: 50–60% 60–70% 70–80% 80–90% Stumbo: 50–60%
Attorney General before election
Andy Beshear
Democratic
Elected Attorney General
Daniel Cameron
Republican

The 2019 Kentucky Attorney General election was conducted on November 5. Primary elections occurred on May 21, 2019. The general election was held on November 5, 2019. Incumbent Democratic Attorney General Andy Beshear declined to seek reelection to a second term to successfully run for Governor. Republican Daniel Cameron won with 57.8% of the vote. He became the first Republican elected attorney general of Kentucky since Eldon S. Dummit in 1944, and the state's first black attorney general.

=== Republican primary ===
Republican primary results
Party	Candidate	Votes	%
Republican	Daniel Cameron	132,580	55.4%
Republican	Wil Schroder	106,950	44.6%
Total votes		239,530	100.0%

=== Democratic primary ===
Greg Stumbo, former Attorney General of Kentucky and former Speaker of the Kentucky House of Representatives, won the Democratic nomination unopposed, so no primary was held.

=== General election ===
Kentucky Attorney General election, 2019
Party	Candidate	Votes	%	±%
Republican	Daniel Cameron	823,343	57.8%	
Democratic	Greg Stumbo	602,218	42.2%	
Total votes		1,425,561	100.00%	
Republican gain from Democratic				

== Louisiana ==
2019 Louisiana Attorney General election
- October 12, 2019
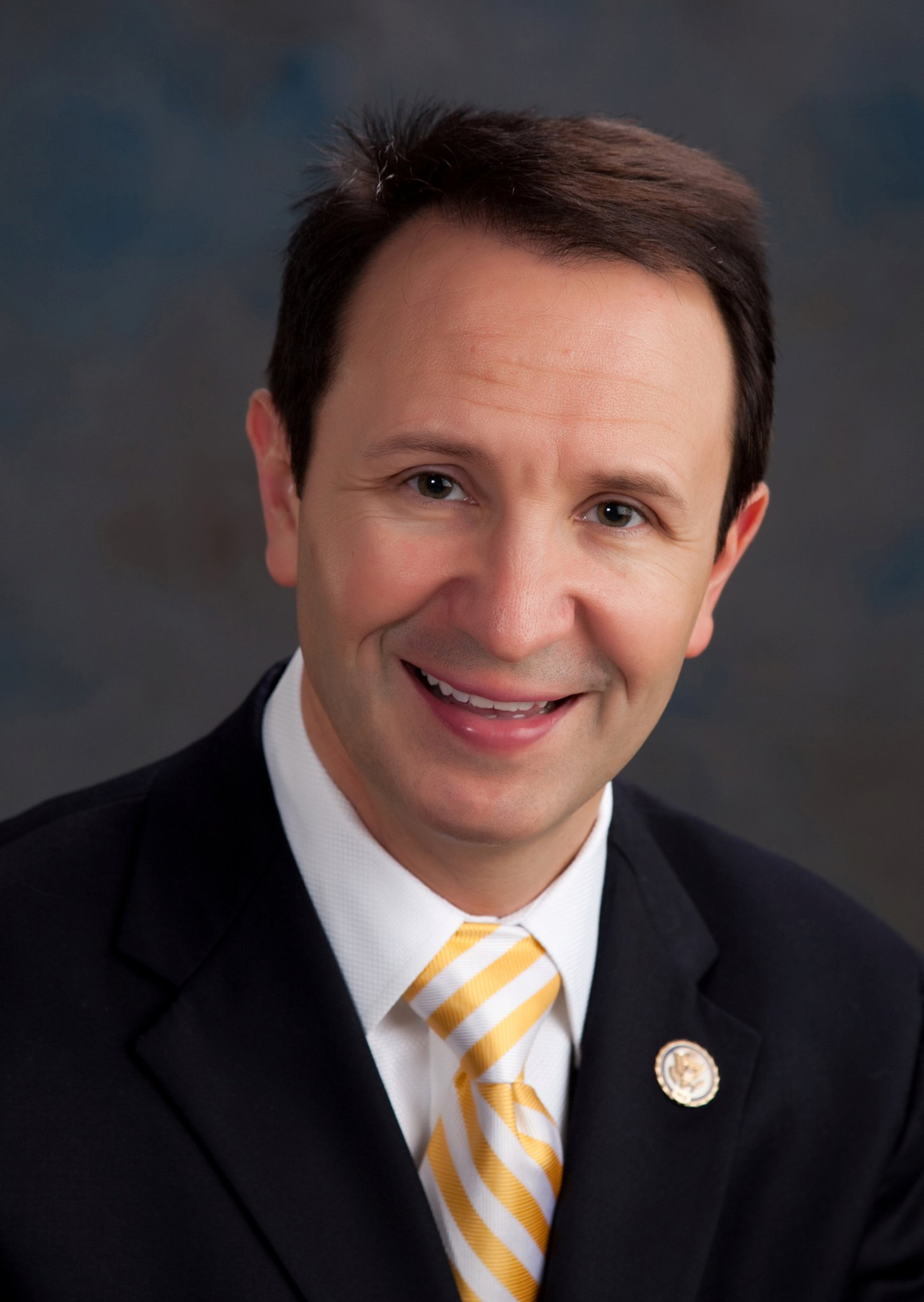

Nominee	Jeff Landry	Ike Jackson
Party	Republican	Democratic
Popular vote	855,338	436,531
Percentage	66.2%	33.8%
- Parish results Landry: 50–60% 60–70% 70–80% 80–90% 90–100% Jackson: 50–60% 70–80%
Attorney General before election
Jeff Landry
Republican
Elected Attorney General
Jeff Landry
Republican

The 2019 Louisiana Attorney General election took place on October 12, 2019 to elect the Attorney General of the state of Louisiana, with a runoff election, held on November 16, 2019. Incumbent Republican Attorney General Jeff Landry ran for a second term against Democrat Ike Jackson. Landy and Jackson were the only candidates to declare.

Under Louisiana's jungle primary system, all candidates appeared on the same ballot, regardless of party, and voters could vote for any candidate, regardless of their party affiliation.

=== General election ===
Louisiana Attorney General election, 2019
Party	Candidate	Votes	%	±%
Republican	Jeff Landry (incumbent)	855,338	66.21%	N/A
Democratic	Ike Jackson	436,531	33.79%	N/A
Total votes		1,291,869	100.00%	N/A
Republican hold				

== Mississippi ==
2019 Mississippi Attorney General election
- November 5, 2019
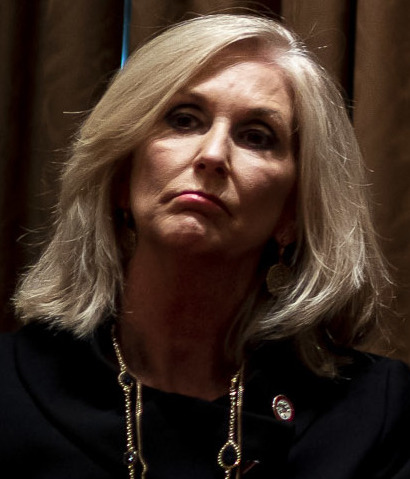

Nominee	Lynn Fitch	Jennifer Riley Collins
Party	Republican	Democratic
Popular vote	507,468	370,068
Percentage	57.83%	42.17%
- County results Fitch: 50–60% 60–70% 70–80% 80–90% Collins: 50–60% 60–70% 70–80% 80–90%
Attorney General before election
Jim Hood
Democratic
Elected Attorney General
Lynn Fitch
Republican

The 2019 Mississippi Attorney General election was held on November 5, 2019, to elect the Attorney General of Mississippi. Incumbent Jim Hood declined to seek re-election to a fifth term, instead running unsuccessfully for Governor. State Treasurer Lynn Fitch won the Republican nomination in a primary runoff against Andy Taggart, and she defeated Democratic nominee Jennifer Riley Collins in the general election. Fitch became the first Republican to hold the office since 1878, as well as the first woman to ever be elected to the position in state history. It also marked the first time in over a century where no members of the Democratic Party held statewide office.

=== Republican primary ===
Republican primary results
Party	Candidate	Votes	%
Republican	Lynn Fitch	163,733	44.2
Republican	Andy Taggart	105,689	28.6
Republican	Mark Baker	100,598	27.2
Total votes		370,020	100.0

==== Runoff ====
Republican runoff results
Party	Candidate	Votes	%
Republican	Lynn Fitch	168,278	52.1
Republican	Andy Taggart	154,807	47.9
Total votes		323,085	100.0

=== Democratic primary ===
Democratic primary results
Party	Candidate	Votes	%
Democratic	Jennifer Riley Collins	253,042	100.0
Total votes		253,042	100.0

=== General election ===
Mississippi Attorney General election, 2019
Party	Candidate	Votes	%
Republican	Lynn Fitch	507,468	57.83%
Democratic	Jennifer Riley Collins	370,068	42.17%
Total votes		869,055	100.0
Republican gain from Democratic			
