= Mississippi's 2nd congressional district =

U.S. House district for Mississippi

Coordinates: 33°10′35″N 90°21′03″W

- Interactive map of district boundaries since January 3, 2023
- Representative: Bennie Thompson; D–Bolton
- Area: 14,519.68 mi^{2} (37,605.8 km^{2})
- Distribution: 62.67% urban; 37.33% rural
- Population (2025): 687,016
- Median household income: $47,980
- Ethnicity: 62.9% Black; 31.8% White; 2.3% Hispanic; 1.9% Two or more races; 0.6% Asian; 0.5% other
- Cook PVI: D+11

Mississippi's 2nd congressional district (MS-2) covers much of Western Mississippi. It includes most of Canton and Jackson, the riverfront cities of Greenville, Natchez and Vicksburg and the interior market cities of Clarksdale, Greenwood and Clinton. The district is approximately 275 miles (443 km) long, 180 miles (290 km) wide and borders the Mississippi River; it encompasses much of the Mississippi Delta, for a total of 28 counties plus parts of Hinds and Madison. It is the only majority-black district in the state. With a Cook Partisan Voting Index rating of D+11, it is also the only Democratic district in Mississippi.

The district is home to four of Mississippi's eight public four-year colleges and universities: Alcorn State University in Lorman; Delta State University in Cleveland; Jackson State University in Jackson; and Mississippi Valley State University in Itta Bena, a few miles west of Greenwood. All except Delta State are HBCUs and are members of the Southwestern Athletic Conference.

The district is one of the poorest in Mississippi and the nation, with 26.2% of people in poverty as of 2017.

The district's current Representative is Democrat Bennie Thompson.

== Recent election results from statewide races ==
Year	Office	Results
2008	President	Obama 63% - 36%
2008	Senate (Reg.)	Fleming 58% - 42%
2008	Senate (Spec.)	Musgrove 62% - 38%
2012	President	Obama 66% - 34%
2016	President	Clinton 62% - 36%
2018	Senate (Reg.)	Baria 60% - 39%
2018	Senate (Spec.)	Espy 67% - 33%
2019	Governor	Hood 66% - 33%
2019	Lt. Governor	Hughes 58% - 42%
2019	Attorney General	Riley Collins 63% - 37%
2020	President	Biden 62% - 36%
2020	Senate	Espy 65% - 34%
2023	Governor	Presley 67% - 31%
2023	Lt. Governor	Grover 58% - 42%
2023	Secretary of State	Pinkins 60% - 40%
2023	Attorney General	Kemp Martin 62% - 38%
2023	Auditor	Bradford 61% - 39%
2023	Treasurer	Lee Green 62% - 38%
2024	President	Harris 60% - 39%
2024	Senate	Pinkins 58% - 42%
2026	Senate	Colom 68% - 29%

== Composition ==
The 2nd district includes the entirety of the following counties, with the exception of Hinds and Madison, which it shares with the 3rd district. The 2nd district takes in all of Hinds County with the exception of a portion of eastern Jackson, while Madison County communities in the district include Kearney Park and most of Canton, part of Gluckstadt, and part of Flora (all of which are shared with the third district).

#	County	Seat	Population
1	Adams	Natchez	28,746
5	Amite	Liberty	12,442
7	Attala	Kosciusko	17,359
11	Bolivar	Cleveland, Rosedale	28,968
15	Carroll	Carrollton, Vaiden	9,535
21	Claiborne	Port Gibson	8,617
27	Coahoma	Clarksdale	20,077
29	Copiah	Hazlehurst	27,664
37	Franklin	Meadville	7,610
43	Grenada	Grenada	21,065
49	Hinds	Jackson, Raymond	214,870
51	Holmes	Lexington	15,777
53	Humphreys	Belzoni	7,216
55	Issaquena	Mayersville	1,256
63	Jefferson	Fayette	6,941
79	Leake	Carthage	21,258
83	Leflore	Greenwood	26,378
89	Madison	Canton	112,511
97	Montgomery	Winona	9,600
107	Panola	Batesville, Sardis	32,669
119	Quitman	Marks	5,546
125	Sharkey	Rolling Fork	3,336
133	Sunflower	Indianola	24,468
135	Tallahatchie	Charleston, Sumner	11,837
143	Tunica	Tunica	9,234
149	Warren	Vicksburg	42,298
151	Washington	Greenville	41,946
157	Wilkinson	Woodville	8,058
161	Yalobusha	Water Valley, Coffeeville	12,386
163	Yazoo	Yazoo City	25,796

== Recent election results ==
=== 2000 ===
2000 United States House of Representatives elections in Mississippi: District 2
Party	Candidate	Votes	%	±%
Democratic	Bennie Thompson (Incumbent)	112,777	65.07	
Republican	Hardy Caraway	54,090	31.21	
Libertarian	William G. Chipman	4,305	2.48	
Reform	Lee F. Dilworth	2,135	1.23	
Turnout		173,307		
Majority		58,687	33.86	

=== 2002 ===
2002 United States House of Representatives elections in Mississippi: District 2
Party	Candidate	Votes	%	±%
Democratic	Bennie Thompson (Incumbent)	89,913	55.14	−9.93
Republican	Clinton B. LeSueur	69,711	42.75	+11.54
Reform	Lee F. Dilworth	3,426	2.10	+0.87
Turnout		163,050		
Majority		20,202	12.39	

=== 2004 ===
2004 United States House of Representatives elections in Mississippi: District 2
Party	Candidate	Votes	%	±%
Democratic	Bennie Thompson (Incumbent)	154,626	58.38	+3.24
Republican	Clinton B. LeSueur	107,647	40.64	−2.11
Reform	Shawn O'Hara	2,596	0.98	−1.12
Turnout		264,869		
Majority		46,979	17.74	

=== 2006 ===
2006 United States House of Representatives elections in Mississippi: District 2
Party	Candidate	Votes	%	±%
Democratic	Bennie Thompson (Incumbent)	100,168	64.27	+5.89
Republican	Yvonne R. Brown	55,672	35.73	−4.91
Turnout		155,832		
Majority		44,496	28.55	

=== 2008 ===
2008 United States House of Representatives elections in Mississippi: District 2
Party	Candidate	Votes	%	±%
Democratic	Bennie Thompson (Incumbent)	201,606	69.05	+4.78
Republican	Richard Cook	90,364	30.95	−4.78
Turnout		291,970		
Majority		111,242	38.10	

=== 2010 ===
2010 United States House of Representatives elections in Mississippi: District 2
Party	Candidate	Votes	%	±%
Democratic	Bennie Thompson (Incumbent)	105,327	61.47	−7.58
Republican	Bill Marcy	64,499	37.64	+6.69
Reform	Ashley Norwood	1,530	0.89	N/A
Total votes		171,356	100.00	
Democratic hold				

=== 2012 ===
2012 United States House of Representatives elections in Mississippi: District 2
Party	Candidate	Votes	%	±%
Democratic	Bennie Thompson (Incumbent)	214,978	67.13	+5.66
Republican	Bill Marcy	99,160	30.96	−6.68
Independent	Cobby Williams	4,605	1.44	N/A
Reform	Lajena Williams	1,501	0.47	−0.42
Total votes		320,244	100.00	
Democratic hold				

=== 2014 ===
2014 United States House of Representatives elections in Mississippi: District 2
Party	Candidate	Votes	%
Democratic	Bennie Thompson (Incumbent)	100,688	67.7
Independent	Troy Ray	36,465	24.5
Reform	Shelley Shoemake	11,493	7.7
Total votes		148,646	100.00
Democratic hold			

=== 2016 ===
2016 United States House of Representatives elections in Mississippi: District 2
Party	Candidate	Votes	%
Democratic	Bennie Thompson (Incumbent)	192,343	67.1
Republican	John Bouie II	83,542	29.1
Independent	Troy Ray	6,918	2.4
Reform	Johnny McLeod	3,823	1.3
Total votes		286,626	100.00
Democratic hold			

=== 2018 ===
2018 United States House of Representatives elections in Mississippi: District 2
Party	Candidate	Votes	%
Democratic	Bennie Thompson (Incumbent)	158,921	71.8
Independent	Troy Ray	48,104	21.7
Reform	Irving Harris	14,354	6.5
Total votes		221,379	100.00
Democratic hold			

=== 2020 ===
2020 United States House of Representatives elections in Mississippi: District 2
Party	Candidate	Votes	%
Democratic	Bennie Thompson (Incumbent)	196,331	66.2
Republican	Brian Flowers	101,037	33.9
Total votes		297,368	100.00
Democratic hold			

=== 2022 ===
2022 United States House of Representatives elections in Mississippi: District 2
Party	Candidate	Votes	%
Democratic	Bennie Thompson (incumbent)	108,285	60.10
Republican	Brian Flowers	71,884	39.90
Total votes		180,169	100.00
Democratic hold			

=== 2024 ===
2024 United States House of Representatives elections in Mississippi: District 2
Party	Candidate	Votes	%
Democratic	Bennie Thompson (incumbent)	177,885	62.02
Republican	Ron Eller	108,956	37.98
Total votes		286,841	100.00
Democratic hold			

== List of members representing the district ==
Name	Party	Years of service	Cong ress	Electoral history	District location and map
District created March 4, 1847
Winfield S. Featherston (Houston)	Democratic	March 4, 1847 – March 3, 1851	30th 31st	Elected in 1846. Re-elected in 1848. Lost re-election as a Southern Rights candidate.	
John A. Wilcox (Aberdeen)	Union	March 4, 1851 – March 3, 1853	32nd	Elected in 1851. Lost re-election as a Whig.	
William T. S. Barry (Greenwood)	Democratic	March 4, 1853 – March 3, 1855	33rd	Elected in 1853. Retired to run for state representative.	
Hendley S. Bennett (Grenada)	Democratic	March 4, 1855 – March 3, 1857	34th	Elected in 1855. Lost renomination.	
Reuben Davis (Aberdeen)	Democratic	March 4, 1857 – January 12, 1861	35th 36th	Elected in 1857. Re-elected in 1859. Withdrew due to Civil War.	
Vacant		January 12, 1861 – February 23, 1870	36th 37th 38th 39th 40th 41st	Civil War and Reconstruction	
Joseph L. Morphis (Pontotoc)	Republican	February 23, 1870 – March 3, 1873	41st 42nd	Elected in 1869 to finish the term and to the next term. Lost renomination.	
Albert R. Howe (Sardis)	Republican	March 4, 1873 – March 3, 1875	43rd	Elected in 1872. Lost re-election.	
G. Wiley Wells (Holly Springs)	Independent Republican	March 4, 1875 – March 3, 1877	44th	Elected in 1874. Retired.	
Van H. Manning (Holly Springs)	Democratic	March 4, 1877 – March 3, 1883	45th 46th 47th	Elected in 1876. Re-elected in 1878. Re-elected in 1880. Re-elected in 1882 but lost contested election.	
Vacant		March 4, 1883 – June 25, 1884	48th		
James R. Chalmers (Sardis)	Independent	June 25, 1884 – March 3, 1885	48th	Seated after contested election with Van H. Manning. Lost re-election.	
James B. Morgan (Hernando)	Democratic	March 4, 1885 – March 3, 1891	49th 50th 51st	Elected in 1884. Re-elected in 1886. Re-elected in 1888. Retired.	
John C. Kyle (Sardis)	Democratic	March 4, 1891 – March 3, 1897	52nd 53rd 54th	Elected in 1890. Re-elected in 1892. Re-elected in 1894. Retired.	
William V. Sullivan (Oxford)	Democratic	March 4, 1897 – May 31, 1898	55th	Elected in 1896. Resigned when appointed U.S. senator.	
Vacant		May 31, 1898 – July 5, 1898	55th		
Thomas Spight (Ripley)	Democratic	July 5, 1898 – March 3, 1911	55th 56th 57th 58th 59th 60th 61st	Elected to finish Sullivan's term. Re-elected in 1898. Re-elected in 1900. Re-elected in 1902. Re-elected in 1904. Re-elected in 1906. Re-elected in 1908. Lost renomination.	
Hubert D. Stephens (New Albany)	Democratic	March 4, 1911 – March 3, 1921	62nd 63rd 64th 65th 66th	Elected in 1910. Re-elected in 1912. Re-elected in 1914. Re-elected in 1916. Re-elected in 1918. Retired.	
Bill G. Lowrey (Blue Mountain)	Democratic	March 4, 1921 – March 3, 1929	67th 68th 69th 70th	Elected in 1920. Re-elected in 1922. Re-elected in 1924. Re-elected in 1926. Lost renomination.	
Wall Doxey (Holly Springs)	Democratic	March 4, 1929 – September 28, 1941	71st 72nd 73rd 74th 75th 76th 77th	Elected in 1928. Re-elected in 1930. Re-elected in 1932. Re-elected in 1934. Re-elected in 1936. Re-elected in 1938. Re-elected in 1940. Resigned when elected U.S. senator.	
Vacant		September 28, 1941 – November 4, 1941	77th		
Jamie Whitten (Charleston)	Democratic	November 4, 1941 – January 3, 1973	77th 78th 79th 80th 81st 82nd 83rd 84th 85th 86th 87th 88th 89th 90th 91st 92nd	Elected to finish Doxey's term. Re-elected in 1942. Re-elected in 1944. Re-elected in 1946. Re-elected in 1948. Re-elected in 1950. Re-elected in 1952. Re-elected in 1954. Re-elected in 1956. Re-elected in 1958. Re-elected in 1960. Re-elected in 1962. Re-elected in 1964. Re-elected in 1966. Re-elected in 1968. Re-elected in 1970. Redistricted to the 1st district.	
David R. Bowen (Cleveland)	Democratic	January 3, 1973 – January 3, 1983	93rd 94th 95th 96th 97th	Elected in 1972. Re-elected in 1974. Re-elected in 1976. Re-elected in 1978. Re-elected in 1980. Retired.	
Webb Franklin (Greenwood)	Republican	January 3, 1983 – January 3, 1987	98th 99th	Elected in 1982. Re-elected in 1984. Lost re-election.	
Mike Espy (Yazoo City)	Democratic	January 3, 1987 – January 22, 1993	100th 101st 102nd 103rd	Elected in 1986. Re-elected in 1988. Re-elected in 1990. Re-elected in 1992. Resigned to become U.S. Secretary of Agriculture.	
Vacant		January 22, 1993 – April 13, 1993	103rd		
Bennie Thompson (Bolton)	Democratic	April 13, 1993 – present	103rd 104th 105th 106th 107th 108th 109th 110th 111th 112th 113th 114th 115th 116th 117th 118th 119th	Elected to finish Espy's term. Re-elected in 1994. Re-elected in 1996. Re-elected in 1998. Re-elected in 2000. Re-elected in 2002. Re-elected in 2004. Re-elected in 2006. Re-elected in 2008. Re-elected in 2010. Re-elected in 2012. Re-elected in 2014. Re-elected in 2016. Re-elected in 2018. Re-elected in 2020. Re-elected in 2022. Re-elected in 2024. Re-elected in 2026.	
Bennie Thompson (Bolton)	Democratic	April 13, 1993 – present	103rd 104th 105th 106th 107th 108th 109th 110th 111th 112th 113th 114th 115th 116th 117th 118th 119th	Elected to finish Espy's term. Re-elected in 1994. Re-elected in 1996. Re-elected in 1998. Re-elected in 2000. Re-elected in 2002. Re-elected in 2004. Re-elected in 2006. Re-elected in 2008. Re-elected in 2010. Re-elected in 2012. Re-elected in 2014. Re-elected in 2016. Re-elected in 2018. Re-elected in 2020. Re-elected in 2022. Re-elected in 2024. Re-elected in 2026.	2003–2013
Bennie Thompson (Bolton)	Democratic	April 13, 1993 – present	103rd 104th 105th 106th 107th 108th 109th 110th 111th 112th 113th 114th 115th 116th 117th 118th 119th	Elected to finish Espy's term. Re-elected in 1994. Re-elected in 1996. Re-elected in 1998. Re-elected in 2000. Re-elected in 2002. Re-elected in 2004. Re-elected in 2006. Re-elected in 2008. Re-elected in 2010. Re-elected in 2012. Re-elected in 2014. Re-elected in 2016. Re-elected in 2018. Re-elected in 2020. Re-elected in 2022. Re-elected in 2024. Re-elected in 2026.	2013–2023
Bennie Thompson (Bolton)	Democratic	April 13, 1993 – present	103rd 104th 105th 106th 107th 108th 109th 110th 111th 112th 113th 114th 115th 116th 117th 118th 119th	Elected to finish Espy's term. Re-elected in 1994. Re-elected in 1996. Re-elected in 1998. Re-elected in 2000. Re-elected in 2002. Re-elected in 2004. Re-elected in 2006. Re-elected in 2008. Re-elected in 2010. Re-elected in 2012. Re-elected in 2014. Re-elected in 2016. Re-elected in 2018. Re-elected in 2020. Re-elected in 2022. Re-elected in 2024. Re-elected in 2026.	2023–present

== See also ==
- Mississippi's congressional districts
- List of United States congressional districts
