= 2004 United States House of Representatives elections in Mississippi =

- November 2, 2004

All 4 Mississippi seats to the United States House of Representatives
	Majority party	Minority party	Third party
Party	Republican	Democratic	Reform
Last election	2	2	0
Seats won	2	2	0
Seat change	Steady	Steady	Steady
Popular vote	658,589	336,240	80,948
Percentage	59.00%	30.12%	7.25%

Republican
50–60%
60–70%
70–80%
80–90%
Democratic
40–50%
50–60%
60–70%
70–80%
80–90%

The 2004 United States House of Representatives elections in Mississippi were held on Tuesday, November 2, 2004 and elected the four U.S. representatives from the state of Mississippi. The elections coincided with the elections of other federal and state offices, including a quadrennial presidential election.

== Overview ==
2004 United States House of Representatives elections in Mississippi
Party	Votes	Percentage	Seats	+/–
Republican	658,589	59.00%	2	Steady
Democratic	336,240	30.12%	2	Steady
Reform	80,948	7.25%	0	Steady
Independents	40,426	3.62%	0	Steady
Totals	1,116,203	100.00%	4	Steady

== District 1 ==
2004 Mississippi's 1st congressional district election

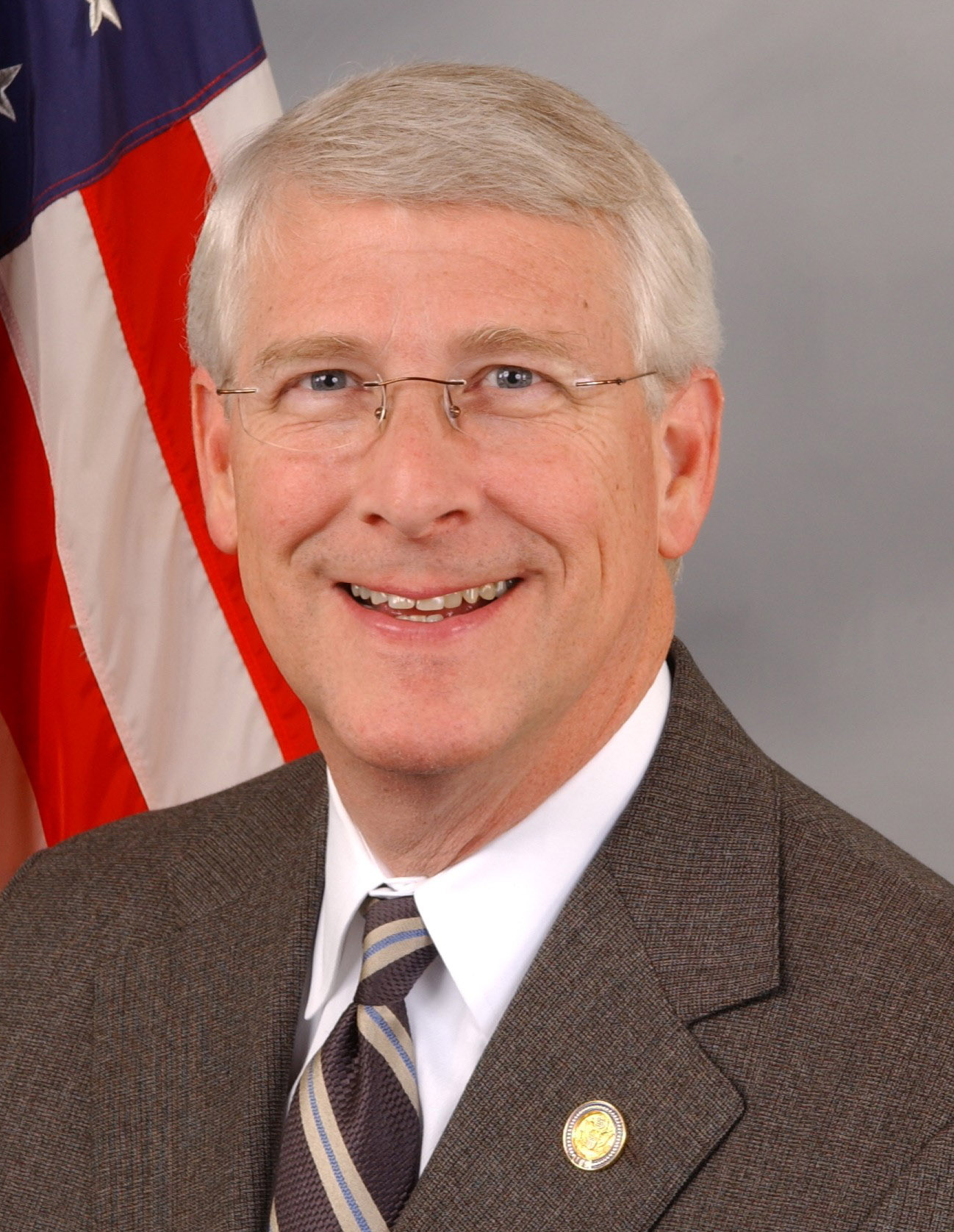

Nominee	Roger Wicker	Barbara Dale Washer
Party	Republican	Reform
Popular vote	219,328	58,256
Percentage	79.0%	21.0%
- County results Wicker: 60–70% 70–80% 80–90%
U.S. Representative before election
Roger Wicker
Republican
Elected U.S. Representative
Roger Wicker
Republican

Republican Roger Wicker, who had represented Mississippi's 1st congressional district since 1994, easily ran for re-election with his only opposition being one third party candidate as the Democrats did not field a candidate.

=== General election ===
==== Predictions ====
Source	Ranking	As of
The Cook Political Report	Safe R	October 29, 2004
Sabato's Crystal Ball	Safe R	November 1, 2004

==== Results ====
2004 Mississippi's 1st congressional district election
Party	Candidate	Votes	%
Republican	Roger Wicker (incumbent)	219,328	79.01
Reform	Barbara Dale Washer	58,256	20.99
Total votes		277,584	100.00
Republican hold			

==== By county ====
County	Roger Wicker Republican		Barbara Dale Washer Reform		Margin		Total
County	#	%	#	%	#	%	Total
Alcorn	7,560	87.98%	1,033	12.02%	6,527	75.96%	8,593
Benton	2,564	65.84%	1,330	34.16%	1,234	31.69%	3,894
Calhoun	5,354	83.36%	1,069	16.64%	4,285	66.71%	6,423
Chickasaw	5,930	75.23%	1,953	24.77%	3,977	50.45%	7,883
Choctaw	3,089	84.98%	546	15.02%	2,543	69.96%	3,635
Clay	6,291	68.54%	2,887	31.46%	3,404	37.09%	9,178
DeSoto	38,403	81.68%	8,611	18.32%	29,792	63.37%	47,014
Grenada	6,505	73.54%	2,340	26.46%	4,165	47.09%	8,845
Itawamba	8,246	86.24%	1,316	13.76%	6,930	72.47%	9,562
Lafayette	10,904	76.77%	3,300	23.23%	7,604	53.53%	14,204
Lee	24,089	84.36%	4,467	15.64%	19,622	68.71%	28,556
Lowndes	16,163	77.43%	4,711	22.57%	11,452	54.86%	20,874
Marshall	7,787	62.75%	4,622	37.25%	3,165	25.51%	12,409
Monroe	12,048	79.41%	3,124	20.59%	8,924	58.82%	15,172
Panola	8,209	66.89%	4,063	33.11%	4,146	33.78%	12,272
Pontotoc	9,859	89.65%	1,138	10.35%	8,721	79.30%	10,997
Prentiss	7,624	75.14%	2,523	24.86%	5,101	50.27%	10,147
Tate	7,667	72.86%	2,856	27.14%	4,811	45.72%	10,523
Tippah	7,214	84.16%	1,358	15.84%	5,856	68.32%	8,572
Tishomingo	6,372	80.41%	1,552	19.59%	4,820	60.83%	7,924
Union	9,157	88.44%	1,197	11.56%	7,960	76.88%	10,354
Webster (part)	4,023	86.11%	649	13.89%	3,374	72.22%	4,672
Winston (part)	55	72.37%	21	27.63%	34	44.74%	76
Yalobusha	4,215	72.61%	1,590	27.39%	2,625	45.22%	5,805
Totals	219,328	79.01%	58,256	20.99%	161,072	58.03%	277,584

== District 2 ==
2004 Mississippi's 2nd congressional district election

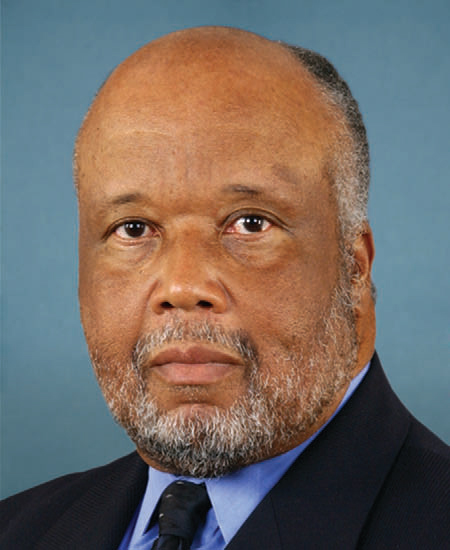

Nominee	Bennie Thompson	Clinton LeSueur
Party	Democratic	Republican
Popular vote	154,626	107,647
Percentage	58.38%	40.64%
- Thompson: 50–60% 60–70% 70–80% 80–90% LeSueur: 50–60% 60–70%
U.S. Representative before election
Bennie Thompson
Democratic
Elected U.S. Representative
Bennie Thompson
Democratic

Democrat Bennie Thompson, who had represented Mississippi's 2nd congressional district since 1993, was running for re-election. Thompson faced no opposition in the primary, but would face Clinton LeSueur in the general.

=== Democratic primary ===
==== Primary results ====
Democratic primary results
Party	Candidate	Votes	%
Democratic	Bennie Thompson (incumbent)	24,316	100.00%
Total votes		24,316	100.00

=== Republican primary ===
==== Primary results ====
Republican primary results
Party	Candidate	Votes	%
Republican	Clinton LeSueur	14,468	84.83%
Republican	Stephanie Summers-O'Neal	1,319	7.73%
Republican	James Broadwater	1,266	7.42%
Republican	Write-in	3	0.02%
Total votes		17,056	100.00

=== General election ===
==== Predictions ====
Source	Ranking	As of
The Cook Political Report	Safe D	October 29, 2004
Sabato's Crystal Ball	Safe D	November 1, 2004

==== Results ====
2004 Mississippi's 2nd congressional district election
Party	Candidate	Votes	%
Democratic	Bennie Thompson (incumbent)	154,626	58.38
Republican	Clinton LeSueur	107,647	40.64
Reform	Shawn O'Hara	2,596	0.98
Total votes		264,869	100.00
Democratic hold			

==== By county ====
County	Bennie Thompson Democratic		Clinton LeSueur Republican		Shawn O'Hara Reform		Margin		Total
County	#	%	#	%	#	%	#	%	Total
Attala	3,386	39.44%	5,099	59.39%	101	1.18%	-1,713	-19.95%	8,586
Bolivar	8,957	59.57%	5,962	39.65%	117	0.78%	2,995	19.92%	15,036
Carroll	2,032	35.35%	3,615	62.88%	102	1.77%	-1,583	-27.54%	5,749
Claiborne	4,350	79.99%	1,052	19.35%	36	0.66%	3,298	60.65%	5,438
Coahoma	6,453	63.56%	3,441	33.89%	259	2.55%	3,012	29.67%	10,153
Copiah	6,197	48.13%	6,514	50.59%	165	1.28%	-317	-2.46%	12,876
Hinds (part)	48,301	63.10%	27,738	36.24%	502	0.66%	20,563	26.87%	76,541
Holmes	6,352	74.25%	2,151	25.14%	52	0.61%	4,201	49.11%	8,555
Humphreys	3,280	66.18%	1,640	33.09%	36	0.73%	1,640	33.09%	4,956
Issaquena	556	56.62%	420	42.77%	6	0.61%	136	13.85%	982
Jefferson	3,298	80.58%	759	18.54%	36	0.88%	2,539	62.03%	4,093
Leake (part)	2,119	48.10%	2,225	50.51%	61	1.38%	-106	-2.41%	4,405
Leflore	7,224	59.90%	4,737	39.28%	99	0.82%	2,487	20.62%	12,060
Madison (part)	8,667	65.30%	4,526	34.10%	79	0.60%	4,141	31.20%	13,272
Montgomery	2,686	48.48%	2,793	50.42%	61	1.10%	-107	-1.93%	5,540
Quitman	2,696	65.47%	1,367	33.20%	55	1.34%	1,329	32.27%	4,118
Sharkey	1,597	58.33%	1,121	40.94%	20	0.73%	476	17.38%	2,738
Sunflower	6,501	62.66%	3,760	36.24%	114	1.10%	2,741	26.42%	10,375
Tallahatchie	3,960	60.03%	2,497	37.85%	140	2.12%	1,463	22.18%	6,597
Tunica	2,367	72.63%	819	25.13%	73	2.24%	1,548	47.50%	3,259
Warren	7,669	39.21%	11,723	59.93%	169	0.86%	-4,054	-20.72%	19,561
Washington	10,959	56.67%	8,184	42.32%	195	1.01%	2,775	14.35%	19,338
Yazoo	5,019	47.17%	5,504	51.72%	118	1.11%	-485	-4.56%	10,641
Totals	154,626	58.38%	107,647	40.64%	2,596	0.98%	46,979	17.74%	264,869

== District 3 ==
2004 Mississippi's 3rd congressional district election

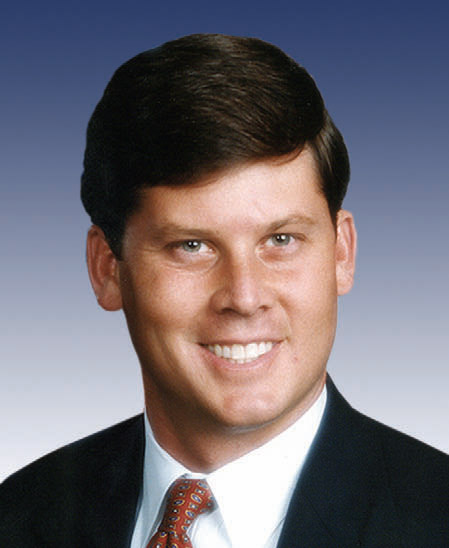

Nominee	Chip Pickering	Jim Giles	Lamonica L. Magee
Party	Republican	Independent	Reform
Popular vote	234,874	40,426	18,068
Percentage	80.06%	13.78%	6.16%
- Pickering: 50–60% 60–70% 70–80% 80–90%
U.S. Representative before election
Chip Pickering
Republican
Elected U.S. Representative
Chip Pickering
Republican

Republican Chip Pickering, who had represented Mississippi's 1st congressional district since 1996, easily ran for re-election with his only opposition being two third-party candidates as the Democrats did not field a candidate.

=== General election ===
==== Predictions ====
Source	Ranking	As of
The Cook Political Report	Safe R	October 29, 2004
Sabato's Crystal Ball	Safe R	November 1, 2004

==== Results ====
2004 Mississippi's 3rd congressional district election
Party	Candidate	Votes	%
Republican	Chip Pickering (incumbent)	234,874	80.06
Independent	Jim Giles	40,426	13.78
Reform	Lamonica L. Magee	18,068	6.16
Total votes		293,368	100.00
Republican hold			

==== By county ====
County	Chip Pickering Republican		Jim Giles Independent		Lamonica L. Magee Reform		Margin		Total
County	#	%	#	%	#	%	#	%	Total
Adams	8,623	74.08%	2,276	19.55%	741	6.37%	6,347	54.53%	11,640
Amite	4,836	72.29%	1,312	19.61%	542	8.10%	3,524	52.68%	6,690
Covington	6,110	75.13%	1,316	16.18%	707	8.69%	4,794	58.95%	8,133
Franklin	3,350	79.37%	614	14.55%	257	6.09%	2,736	64.82%	4,221
Hinds (part)	12,542	84.61%	1,541	10.40%	740	4.99%	11,001	74.22%	14,823
Jasper (part)	1,961	66.81%	676	23.03%	298	10.15%	1,285	43.78%	2,935
Jefferson Davis	3,815	63.48%	1,504	25.02%	691	11.50%	2,311	38.45%	6,010
Jones (part)	800	80.81%	131	13.23%	59	5.96%	669	67.58%	990
Kemper	3,136	71.24%	932	21.17%	334	7.59%	2,204	50.07%	4,402
Lauderdale	22,962	83.62%	3,394	12.36%	1,105	4.02%	19,568	71.26%	27,461
Lawrence	4,661	76.59%	970	15.94%	455	7.48%	3,691	60.65%	6,086
Leake (part)	3,118	81.90%	535	14.05%	154	4.05%	2,583	67.85%	3,807
Lincoln	11,735	81.61%	1,866	12.98%	779	5.42%	9,869	68.63%	14,380
Madison (part)	22,067	87.15%	2,177	8.60%	1,078	4.26%	19,890	78.55%	25,322
Marion (part)	3,783	77.86%	830	17.08%	246	5.06%	2,953	60.77%	4,859
Neshoba	9,062	87.25%	927	8.93%	397	3.82%	8,135	78.33%	10,386
Newton	6,995	85.85%	768	9.43%	385	4.73%	6,227	76.42%	8,148
Noxubee	2,667	60.61%	1,356	30.82%	377	8.57%	1,311	29.80%	4,400
Oktibbeha	11,294	72.40%	2,866	18.37%	1,440	9.23%	8,428	54.03%	15,600
Pike	10,438	68.08%	3,334	21.75%	1,559	10.17%	7,104	46.34%	15,331
Rankin	44,624	89.31%	3,566	7.14%	1,776	3.55%	41,058	82.17%	49,966
Scott	7,878	80.57%	1,425	14.57%	475	4.86%	6,453	66.00%	9,778
Simpson	8,264	75.76%	1,695	15.54%	949	8.70%	6,569	60.22%	10,908
Smith	6,450	85.18%	872	11.52%	250	3.30%	5,578	73.67%	7,572
Walthall	4,486	71.22%	911	14.46%	902	14.32%	3,575	56.76%	6,299
Webster (part)	317	81.49%	57	14.65%	15	3.86%	260	66.84%	389
Wilkinson	2,117	56.18%	925	24.55%	726	19.27%	1,192	31.63%	3,768
Winston (part)	6,783	74.83%	1,650	18.20%	631	6.96%	5,133	56.63%	9,064
Totals	234,874	80.06%	40,426	13.78%	18,068	6.16%	194,448	66.28%	293,368

== District 4 ==
2004 Mississippi's 4th congressional district election

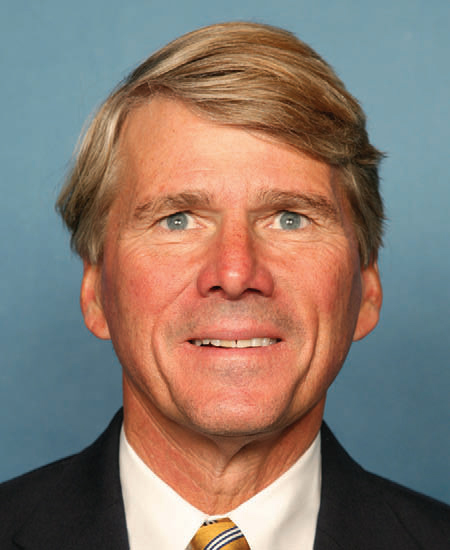

Nominee	Gene Taylor	Michael Lott
Party	Democratic	Republican
Popular vote	181,614	96,740
Percentage	64.8%	34.5%
- County results Taylor: 50–60% 60–70% 70–80% Lott: 50–60%
U.S. Representative before election
Gene Taylor
Democratic
Elected U.S. Representative
Gene Taylor
Democratic

Democrat Gene Taylor, who had represented Mississippi's 3rd congressional district since 1989, was running for re-election. Thompson faced no opposition in the primary, but would face State Representative Michael Lott in the general.

=== Democratic primary ===
==== Primary results ====
Democratic primary results
Party	Candidate	Votes	%
Democratic	Gene Taylor (incumbent)	938	100.00%
Total votes		938	100.00

=== Republican primary ===
==== Primary results ====
Republican primary results
Party	Candidate	Votes	%
Republican	Michael Lott	14,468	84.83%
Republican	Stephanie Summers-O'Neal	1,319	7.73%
Republican	James Broadwater	1,266	7.42%
Republican	Write-in	3	0.02%
Total votes		17,056	100.00

=== General election ===
==== Predictions ====
Source	Ranking	As of
The Cook Political Report	Safe D	October 29, 2004
Sabato's Crystal Ball	Safe D	November 1, 2004

==== Results ====
2004 Mississippi's 4th congressional district election
Party	Candidate	Votes	%
Democratic	Gene Taylor (incumbent)	181,614	64.77
Republican	Michael Lott	96,740	34.50
Reform	Tracella Lou O'Hara Hill	2,028	0.72
Total votes		280,382	100.00
Democratic hold			

==== By county ====
County	Gene Taylor Democratic		Michael Lott Republican		Tracella Lou O'Hara Hill Reform		Margin		Total
County	#	%	#	%	#	%	#	%	Total
Clarke	3,426	43.33%	4,407	55.74%	74	0.94%	-981	-12.41%	7,907
Forrest	16,745	62.52%	9,793	36.57%	244	0.91%	6,952	25.96%	26,782
George	5,783	68.75%	2,590	30.79%	39	0.46%	3,193	37.96%	8,412
Greene	3,685	68.57%	1,664	30.96%	25	0.47%	2,021	37.61%	5,374
Hancock	12,237	68.52%	5,486	30.72%	136	0.76%	6,751	37.80%	17,859
Harrison	46,954	72.90%	16,875	26.20%	577	0.90%	30,079	46.70%	64,406
Jackson	34,063	67.65%	15,994	31.76%	297	0.59%	18,069	35.88%	50,354
Jasper (part)	3,619	71.81%	1,385	27.48%	36	0.71%	2,234	44.33%	5,040
Jones (part)	15,181	57.76%	10,953	41.67%	149	0.57%	4,228	16.09%	26,283
Lamar	10,714	52.60%	9,538	46.83%	117	0.57%	1,176	5.77%	20,369
Marion (part)	3,994	57.08%	2,958	42.28%	45	0.64%	1,036	14.81%	6,997
Pearl River	10,248	52.01%	9,294	47.17%	161	0.82%	954	4.84%	19,703
Perry	3,696	69.49%	1,600	30.08%	23	0.43%	2,096	39.41%	5,319
Stone	4,522	72.10%	1,701	27.12%	49	0.78%	2,821	44.98%	6,272
Wayne	6,747	72.51%	2,502	26.89%	56	0.60%	4,245	45.62%	9,305
Totals	181,614	64.77%	96,740	34.50%	2,028	0.72%	84,874	30.27%	280,382
