= Killing of Kohen Wiley =

2026 police killing in Senatobia, Mississippi, US

- Foster's body camera footage, as he fires at the car
- Date: June 14, 2026
- Location: Senatobia, Mississippi, US; 34.62928°N 89.97129°W
- Type: Shooting by law enforcement
- Deaths: 1 (Kohen Wiley)
- Injuries: 1
- Accused: Hunter Foster

On June 14, 2026, Kohen Kartier Wiley, a 1-year-old African American boy, was fatally shot by Hunter Foster, a White police officer, in Senatobia, Mississippi. Officers from the Senatobia Police Department were responding to an unrelated shoplifting or sexual assault call from a Walmart when they were alerted of two women, Latoya Ferrell and Vel'lesiya Wiley, leaving the store with a box of diapers. On foot, officers pursued a sedan driven by Ferrell with Vel'lesiya Wiley holding Kohen Wiley in the passenger seat. SPD Sergeant Foster's right leg was nearly hit after stepping in front of the sedan. Foster then fired four shots through the passenger side of the vehicle, killing Kohen Wiley and severely injuring Ferrell.

The box of diapers were alleged to be stolen by Mississippi authorities, but no shoplifting charges have been made against either Ferrell or Vel'lesiya Wiley.

On October 19, Mississippi Attorney General Lynn Fitch announced an end to the Mississippi investigation into the killing, saying Foster was "justified" in firing the shots that killed Wiley. On October 23, Foster resigned from the Senatobia Police Department. The killing has sparked protests and calls for a federal investigation.

== Incident ==
Latoya Ferrell, Vel'lesiya Wiley, and her son Kohen Wiley had been shopping at a Walmart in Senatobia, Mississippi. Ferrell claims she bought diapers and baby clothes at a self-service checkout before they all left the store to go to the car.

Police officers from the Senatobia Police Department and Tate County Sheriff's Office were present at the Walmart in response to an unrelated shoplifting or sexual assault call. The officers were then notified by a purported Walmart Asset Protection associate of two women leaving the store. Surveillance footage showed Ferrell holding a box and Vel'lesiya carrying Kohen. They walked past an individual, purported to be a Walmart employee, and began to run. That purported employee then went and told officers that "Two people are running". The officers ran and approached a gray sedan driven by Ferrell, with Vellesiya and Kohen Wiley in the front passenger seat. When an officer attempted to open the driver side door, Ferrell suddenly reversed out of a parking spot, hitting a parked vehicle in the lot. The five officers then approached the vehicle with handguns drawn, making verbal demands to stop the car. Ferrell turned left and attempted to drive between Foster and another officer. Foster had stepped in front of the sedan, and then swung his right leg out of the path of the vehicle to avoid being hit. Foster immediately fired four shots through the passenger side windshield and window, killing Kohen Wiley and severely injuring Ferrell. The shot that killed Wiley was fired through the passenger side window. When he fired the shot, Foster was standing off of the passenger side of the vehicle and was not endangered by the vehicle's forward movement.

== Aftermath ==
=== Investigation ===
On June 12, two days prior to the killing of Wiley, Senatobia Police Department Sergeant Hunter Foster was the subject of an internal complaint over calling an unfamiliar coworker a "Black motherfucker."

On June 16, Foster was placed on leave, and an investigation by the Mississippi Department of Public Safety into the incident began. Foster was not immediately identified as one of the officers involved, but was later identified in public records. On September 17, the investigation was turned over to the Mississippi Attorney General.

A police statement acknowledged that officers were aware of Kohen Wiley before Foster opened fire on the vehicle.

On October 19, Mississippi Attorney General Lynn Fitch announced an end to the Mississippi investigation into the killing, saying Foster was "justified" in firing the shots that killed Wiley. Investigators never interviewed Vel'lesiya Wiley or other family of Kohen Wiley.

On October 20, a compilation of body camera and Walmart surveillance videos of the shooting was leaked online. On October 22, the Mississippi Department of Public Safety released additional footage of the shooting. On October 23, Foster resigned from the SPD.

The headquarters of the Senatobia Police Department were damaged in a fire on the morning of October 31, 2026. The Bureau of Alcohol, Tobacco, Firearms and Explosives (ATF) is investigating the fire as a suspected arson.

Multiple Mississippi authorities have claimed that Latoya Ferrell or both Ferrell and Vellesiya Wiley had shoplifted a box of diapers. Vellesiya Wiley strongly denied the allegations, and called for a review of Walmart's self-service checkout footage to clear Ferrell. No shoplifting charges have been made against either Wiley or Ferrell.

=== Reactions and protests ===
Attorney Benjamin Crump is representing the family of Kohen Wiley. On July 1, the family of Wiley announced that a preliminary autopsy found that Wiley was likely shot from the passenger side of the car by a bullet that entered his right chest and went out his left. With the release of footage of the killing, Crump denounced the police comportment as "excessive from the very start" and called for a federal probe.

A rally for Wiley was held on June 16 outside Senatobia City Hall, calling for the release of the body camera footage of the incident. A protest was also held outside the Walmart where the shooting occurred, with police deploying tear gas on protesters. The Building Bridges Commission, a Mississippi nonprofit, made an announcement supporting a boycott of Walmart.

== See also ==
- List of unarmed African Americans killed by law enforcement officers in the United States
- Lists of killings by law enforcement officers in the United States
- Shooting bias
