= Cheikh Taylor =

American politician

Chair of the Mississippi Democratic Party
- Incumbent
- Assumed office July 6, 2023
- Preceded by: Tyree Irving

Member of the Mississippi House of Representatives from the 38th district
- Incumbent
- Assumed office December 11, 2017
- Preceded by: Tyrone Ellis

Personal details
- Born: December 12, 1973 (age 52) Columbus, Mississippi, U.S.
- Party: Democratic
- Children: 2
- Education: Howard University (BS)

Cheikh A. Taylor (born December 12, 1973) is an American politician serving as a member of the Mississippi House of Representatives from the 38th district. Elected in 2016, he assumed office in 2017. Taylor was elected Chair of the Mississippi Democratic Party July 6, 2023 in an emergency meeting.

== Background ==
Taylor was born in Columbus, Mississippi and raised in Starkville, Mississippi. He earned a Bachelor of Science degree from Howard University. Taylor was elected to the Mississippi House of Representatives in November 2016 and assumed office in 2017. During his tenure in the House, Taylor has served as the vice chair of the County Affairs Committee.

Party political offices
Preceded by Tyree Irving	Chair of the Mississippi Democratic Party; 2023–present	Incumbent
