= 2023 Mississippi Attorney General election =

- November 7, 2023
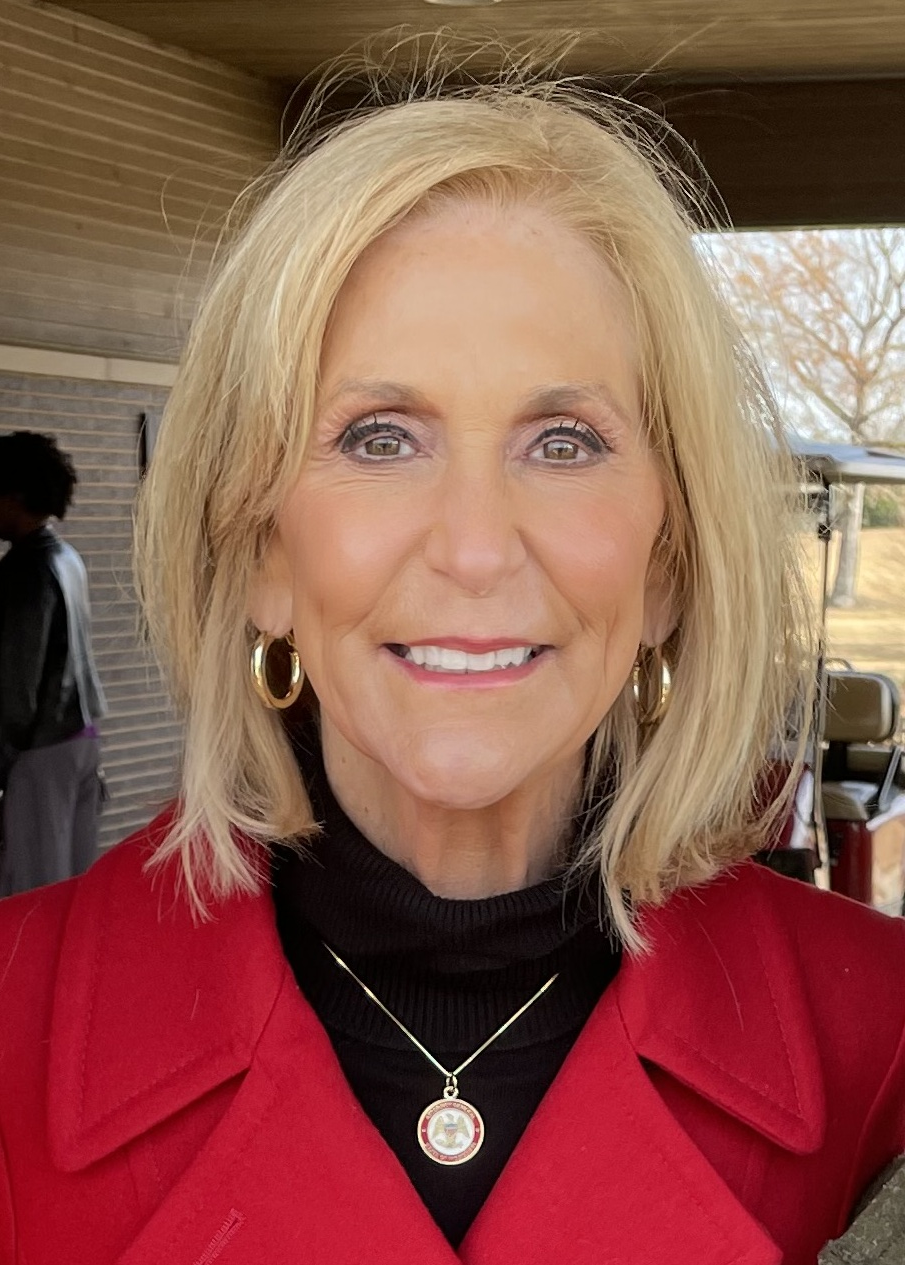

Nominee	Lynn Fitch	Greta Kemp Martin
Party	Republican	Democratic
Popular vote	470,870	339,948
Percentage	58.07%	41.93%
- Fitch: 50–60% 60–70% 70–80% 80–90% Martin: 50–60% 60–70% 70–80% 80–90%
Attorney General before election
Lynn Fitch
Republican
Elected Attorney General
Lynn Fitch
Republican

The 2023 Mississippi Attorney General election was held on November 7, 2023, to elect the Attorney General of Mississippi. Incumbent Republican Attorney General Lynn Fitch was re-elected to a second term in office, defeating Democratic challenger Greta Kemp Martin in a landslide.

== Republican primary ==
=== Candidates ===
==== Nominee ====
- Lynn Fitch, incumbent attorney general (2020–present)

=== Results ===
Republican primary results
Party	Candidate	Votes	%
Republican	Lynn Fitch (incumbent)	350,670	100.00%
Total votes		350,670	100.00%

== Democratic primary ==
=== Candidates ===
==== Nominee ====
- Greta Kemp Martin, attorney and Disability Rights Mississippi litigation director

=== Results ===
Democratic primary results
Party	Candidate	Votes	%
Democratic	Greta Kemp Martin	152,682	100.00%
Total votes		152,682	100.00%

== General election ==
=== Predictions ===
Source	Ranking	As of
Sabato's Crystal Ball	Safe R	June 21, 2023

=== Endorsements ===
Lynn Fitch (R)

Organizations

- Susan B. Anthony Pro-Life America
Greta Kemp Martin (D)

Organizations

- Democratic Attorneys General Association
- Planned Parenthood Southeast Advocates
- Reproductive Freedom for All
- Vote Mama

==== Polling ====
Poll source	Date(s) administered	Sample size (Note: Key: A – all adults RV – registered voters LV – likely voters V – unclear)	Margin of error	Lynn Fitch (R)	Greta Martin (D)	Other	Undecided
Mississippi Today/Siena College	August 20–28, 2023	650 (LV)	± 4.0%	54%	35%	2% (Note: "Not going to vote" with 2%)	9%

=== Results ===
2023 Mississippi Attorney General election
Party	Candidate	Votes	%	±%
Republican	Lynn Fitch (incumbent)	470,870	58.07	+0.24
Democratic	Greta Kemp Martin	339,948	41.93	–0.24
Total votes		810,818	100.00	N/A
Republican hold				

==== By county ====
County	Lynn Fitch Republican		Greta Kemp Martin Democratic		Margin		Total
County	#	%	#	%	#	%	Total
Adams	3,983	43.06%	5,267	56.94%	-1,284	-13.88%	9,250
Alcorn	6,806	81.84%	1,510	18.16%	5,296	63.68%	8,316
Amite	3,223	63.76%	1,832	36.24%	1,391	27.52%	5,055
Attala	3,437	58.64%	2,424	41.36%	1,013	17.28%	5,861
Benton	1,847	66.61%	926	33.39%	921	33.21%	2,773
Bolivar	2,911	36.55%	5,053	63.45%	-2,142	-26.90%	7,964
Calhoun	3,256	72.79%	1,217	27.21%	2,039	45.58%	4,473
Carroll	2,501	67.58%	1,200	32.42%	1,301	35.15%	3,701
Chickasaw	2,971	53.35%	2,598	46.65%	373	6.70%	5,569
Choctaw	2,008	72.41%	765	27.59%	1,243	44.83%	2,773
Claiborne	549	18.09%	2,486	81.91%	-1,937	-63.82%	3,035
Clarke	3,876	65.72%	2,022	34.28%	1,854	31.43%	5,898
Clay	3,068	43.78%	3,940	56.22%	-872	-12.44%	7,008
Coahoma	1,589	31.53%	3,451	68.47%	-1,862	-36.94%	5,040
Copiah	4,584	49.50%	4,676	50.50%	-92	-0.99%	9,260
Covington	3,971	63.38%	2,294	36.62%	1,677	26.77%	6,265
DeSoto	23,137	62.93%	13,630	37.07%	9,507	25.86%	36,767
Forrest	10,287	56.41%	7,949	43.59%	2,338	12.82%	18,236
Franklin	2,093	65.84%	1,086	34.16%	1,007	31.68%	3,179
George	4,120	87.77%	574	12.23%	3,546	75.54%	4,694
Greene	2,764	80.00%	691	20.00%	2,073	60.00%	3,455
Grenada	4,439	56.12%	3,471	43.88%	968	12.24%	7,910
Hancock	7,974	76.28%	2,480	23.72%	5,494	52.55%	10,454
Harrison	26,460	62.13%	16,127	37.87%	10,333	24.26%	42,587
Hinds	17,145	25.36%	50,458	74.64%	-33,313	-49.28%	67,603
Holmes	1,227	21.53%	4,473	78.47%	-3,246	-56.95%	5,700
Humphreys	893	30.23%	2,061	69.77%	-1,168	-39.54%	2,954
Issaquena	210	49.88%	211	50.12%	-1	-0.24%	421
Itawamba	5,968	86.93%	897	13.07%	5,071	73.87%	6,865
Jackson	19,124	67.67%	9,138	32.33%	9,986	35.33%	28,262
Jasper	2,980	50.22%	2,954	49.78%	26	0.44%	5,934
Jefferson	469	17.64%	2,189	82.36%	-1,720	-64.71%	2,658
Jefferson Davis	1,729	40.98%	2,490	59.02%	-761	-18.04%	4,219
Jones	14,724	72.26%	5,652	27.74%	9,072	44.52%	20,376
Kemper	1,525	41.78%	2,125	58.22%	-600	-16.44%	3,650
Lafayette	8,822	59.91%	5,904	40.09%	2,918	19.82%	14,726
Lamar	12,472	74.84%	4,192	25.16%	8,280	49.69%	16,664
Lauderdale	10,966	60.98%	7,016	39.02%	3,950	21.97%	17,982
Lawrence	2,867	64.46%	1,581	35.54%	1,286	28.91%	4,448
Leake	3,901	59.69%	2,634	40.31%	1,267	19.39%	6,535
Lee	15,420	67.08%	7,569	32.92%	7,851	34.15%	22,989
Leflore	2,158	30.72%	4,867	69.28%	-2,709	-38.56%	7,025
Lincoln	7,884	69.78%	3,415	30.22%	4,469	39.55%	11,299
Lowndes	9,228	52.61%	8,311	47.39%	917	5.23%	17,539
Madison	21,910	56.75%	16,699	43.25%	5,211	13.50%	38,609
Marion	4,871	66.16%	2,491	33.84%	2,380	32.33%	7,362
Marshall	4,804	54.03%	4,087	45.97%	717	8.06%	8,891
Monroe	7,154	63.98%	4,028	36.02%	3,126	27.96%	11,182
Montgomery	1,720	54.34%	1,445	45.66%	275	8.69%	3,165
Neshoba	5,001	72.96%	1,853	27.04%	3,148	45.93%	6,854
Newton	4,303	68.55%	1,974	31.45%	2,329	37.10%	6,277
Noxubee	886	25.71%	2,560	74.29%	-1,674	-48.58%	3,446
Oktibbeha	6,352	50.61%	6,199	49.39%	153	1.22%	12,551
Panola	6,345	56.10%	4,965	43.90%	1,380	12.20%	11,310
Pearl River	8,933	81.22%	2,066	18.78%	6,867	62.43%	10,999
Perry	2,905	76.45%	895	23.55%	2,010	52.89%	3,800
Pike	5,787	49.08%	6,004	50.92%	-217	-1.84%	11,791
Pontotoc	7,392	82.36%	1,583	17.64%	5,809	64.72%	8,975
Prentiss	4,851	78.97%	1,292	21.03%	3,559	57.94%	6,143
Quitman	844	38.93%	1,324	61.07%	-480	-22.14%	2,168
Rankin	30,958	70.50%	12,955	29.50%	18,003	41.00%	43,913
Scott	4,581	58.15%	3,297	41.85%	1,284	16.30%	7,878
Sharkey	482	32.55%	999	67.45%	-517	-34.91%	1,481
Simpson	4,769	63.01%	2,800	36.99%	1,969	26.01%	7,569
Smith	3,765	76.08%	1,184	23.92%	2,581	52.15%	4,949
Stone	3,965	77.85%	1,128	22.15%	2,837	55.70%	5,093
Sunflower	1,924	32.63%	3,972	67.37%	-2,048	-34.74%	5,896
Tallahatchie	1,790	46.91%	2,026	53.09%	-236	-6.18%	3,816
Tate	5,714	67.18%	2,791	32.82%	2,923	34.37%	8,505
Tippah	4,519	80.41%	1,101	19.59%	3,418	60.82%	5,620
Tishomingo	4,721	83.51%	932	16.49%	3,789	67.03%	5,653
Tunica	667	33.62%	1,317	66.38%	-650	-32.76%	1,984
Union	6,232	83.13%	1,265	16.87%	4,967	66.25%	7,497
Walthall	2,951	58.51%	2,093	41.49%	858	17.01%	5,044
Warren	6,872	51.46%	6,482	48.54%	390	2.92%	13,354
Washington	3,082	30.38%	7,063	69.62%	-3,981	-39.24%	10,145
Wayne	4,797	64.08%	2,689	35.92%	2,108	28.16%	7,486
Webster	2,726	79.78%	691	20.22%	2,035	59.56%	3,417
Wilkinson	1,105	37.62%	1,832	62.38%	-727	-24.75%	2,937
Winston	3,626	56.81%	2,757	43.19%	869	13.61%	6,383
Yalobusha	2,522	58.42%	1,795	41.58%	727	16.84%	4,317
Yazoo	3,478	49.79%	3,508	50.21%	-30	-0.43%	6,986
Totals	470,870	58.07%	339,948	41.93%	130,922	16.15%	810,818

Counties that flipped from Democratic to Republican

- Jasper (largest city: Bay Springs)
- Marshall (largest city: Holly Springs)
- Oktibbeha (largest city: Starkville)

Counties that flipped from Republican to Democratic

- Pike (largest city: McComb)

==== By congressional district ====
Fitch won three of four congressional districts.

District	Fitch	Martin	Representative
1st	67%	33%	Trent Kelly
2nd	38%	62%	Bennie Thompson
3rd	62%	38%	Michael Guest
4th	69%	31%	Mike Ezell
