= 2023 Louisiana Attorney General election =

- October 14, 2023 (first round); November 18, 2023 (runoff)
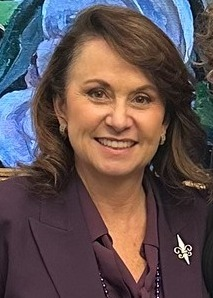

Candidate	Liz Murrill	Lindsey Cheek	John Stefanski
Party	Republican	Democratic	Republican
First round	463,103; 45.2%	239,652; 23.4%	172,300; 16.8%
Runoff	444,081; 66.4%	225,011; 33.6%	Eliminated
Candidate	Perry Walker Terrebonne	Marty Maley
Party	Democratic	Republican
First round	74,479; 7.3%	74,176; 7.3%
Runoff	Eliminated	Eliminated
- Murrill: 20–30% 30–40% 40–50% 50–60% 60–70% 70–80% 80–90% >90% Cheek: 20–30% 30–40% 40–50% 50–60% 60–70% 70–80% 80–90% >90% Stefanski: 20–30% 30–40% 40–50% 50–60% 60–70% 70–80% 80–90% Terrebonne: 30–40% 40–50% 50–60% 60–70% Maley: 20–30% 30–40% 40–50% 50–60% >90% Tie: 20–30% 30–40% 40–50% 50% No votes Murrill: 20–30% 30–40% 40–50% 50–60% 60–70% 70–80% 80–90% >90% Cheek: 20–30% 30–40% 40–50% 50–60% 60–70% 70–80% 80–90% >90% Stefanski: 20–30% 30–40% 40–50% 50–60% 60–70% 70–80% 80–90% Terrebonne: 30–40% 40–50% 50–60% 60–70% Maley: 20–30% 30–40% 40–50% 50–60% >90% Tie: 20–30% 30–40% 40–50% 50% No votes Murrill: 20–30% 30–40% 40–50% 50–60% 60–70% 70–80% 80–90% >90% Cheek: 20–30% 30–40% 40–50% 50–60% 60–70% 70–80% 80–90% >90% Stefanski: 20–30% 30–40% 40–50% 50–60% 60–70% 70–80% 80–90% Terrebonne: 30–40% 40–50% 50–60% 60–70% Maley: 20–30% 30–40% 40–50% 50–60% >90% Tie: 20–30% 30–40% 40–50% 50% No votes Murrill: 50–60% 60–70% 70–80% 80–90% >90% Cheek: 50–60% 60–70% 70–80% 80–90% Murrill: 50–60% 60–70% 70–80% 80–90% >90% Cheek: 50–60% 60–70% 70–80% 80–90%
Attorney General before election
Jeff Landry
Republican
Elected Attorney General
Liz Murrill
Republican

The 2023 Louisiana Attorney General election was held on November 18, 2023, to elect the next attorney general of Louisiana, with the first round occurring on October 14. Incumbent Republican Attorney General Jeff Landry retired to successfully run for governor, leading to an open race. In the runoff, Louisiana Solicitor General Liz Murrill defeated attorney Lindsey Cheek by a margin of 33 percent.

Under Louisiana's two round system, all candidates appeared on the same ballot, regardless of party, and voters were allowed to vote for any candidate, regardless of their party affiliation.

== Candidates ==
=== Republican candidates ===
==== Advanced to runoff ====
- Liz Murrill, Louisiana Solicitor General

==== Eliminated in Primary ====
- Marty Maley, former assistant district attorney for the 18th judicial district and candidate for attorney general in 2015
- John Stefanski, state representative

==== Declined ====
- Jeff Landry, incumbent attorney general (ran for governor)
- Tanner Magee, state representative (ran for 1st Circuit Court of Appeal judgeship)

=== Democratic candidates ===
==== Advanced to Runoff ====
- Lindsey Cheek, personal injury attorney

==== Eliminated in Primary ====
- Perry Walker Terrebonne, attorney

=== Independent candidates ===
==== Withdrew ====
- John Belton, district attorney for the 3rd judicial district

== Jungle primary ==
=== Endorsements ===
Lindsey Cheek (D)

Organizations

- Democratic Attorneys General Association
Liz Murrill (R)

Organizations

- Republican Attorneys General Association
- Louisiana Republican Party
- Susan B. Anthony Pro-Life America
John Stefanski (R)

U.S. Representatives

- Ralph Abraham, former U.S. Representative for Louisiana's 5th congressional district and candidate for governor in 2019

Newspapers and other media

- The Times-Picayune/The New Orleans Advocate

=== Polling ===
Hypothetical polling

Poll source	Date(s) administered	Sample size	Margin of error	John Belton (I)	Marty Maley (R)	Liz Murill (R)	John Stefanski (R)	Undecided
JMC Analytics	March 6–8, 2023	600 (LV)	± 4.0%	13%	2%	10%	7%	68%

=== Results ===
2023 Louisiana Attorney General election jungle primary
Party	Candidate	Votes	%
Republican	Liz Murrill	463,103	45.24%
Democratic	Lindsey Cheek	239,652	23.41%
Republican	John Stefanski	172,300	16.83%
Democratic	Perry Walker Terrebonne	74,479	7.28%
Republican	Marty Maley	74,176	7.25%
Total votes		1,023,710	100.0%

== Runoff ==
=== Predictions ===
Source	Ranking	As of
Sabato's Crystal Ball	Safe R	June 21, 2023

=== Results ===
2023 Louisiana Attorney General runoff
Party	Candidate	Votes	%	±%
Republican	Liz Murrill	444,081	66.37%	+0.16
Democratic	Lindsey Cheek	225,011	33.63%	−0.16
Total votes		669,092	100.0%	
Republican hold				

==== By congressional district ====
Murrill won five of six congressional districts.

District	Murrill	Cheek	Representative
1st	76%	24%	Steve Scalise
2nd	30%	70%	Troy Carter
3rd	75%	25%	Clay Higgins
4th	65%	35%	Mike Johnson
5th	72%	28%	Julia Letlow
6th	71%	29%	Garret Graves

== See also ==
- 2023 Louisiana elections
- 2023 United States attorney general elections
