= 2027 Louisiana lieutenant gubernatorial election =

- October 9, 2027
Incumbent Lieutenant Governor
Billy Nungesser
Republican

The 2027 Louisiana lieutenant gubernatorial election will be held on October 9, 2027, to elect the lieutenant governor of Louisiana. If no candidate receives a majority in the primary, a runoff between the top two finishers will be held on November 20. Republican incumbent Billy Nungesser has stated that he intends to run for reelection to a fourth consecutive term.

== Candidates ==
=== Republican Party ===
==== Potential ====
- Billy Nungesser, incumbent lieutenant governor (2016–present)
