= 2019 Mississippi Attorney General election =

- November 5, 2019
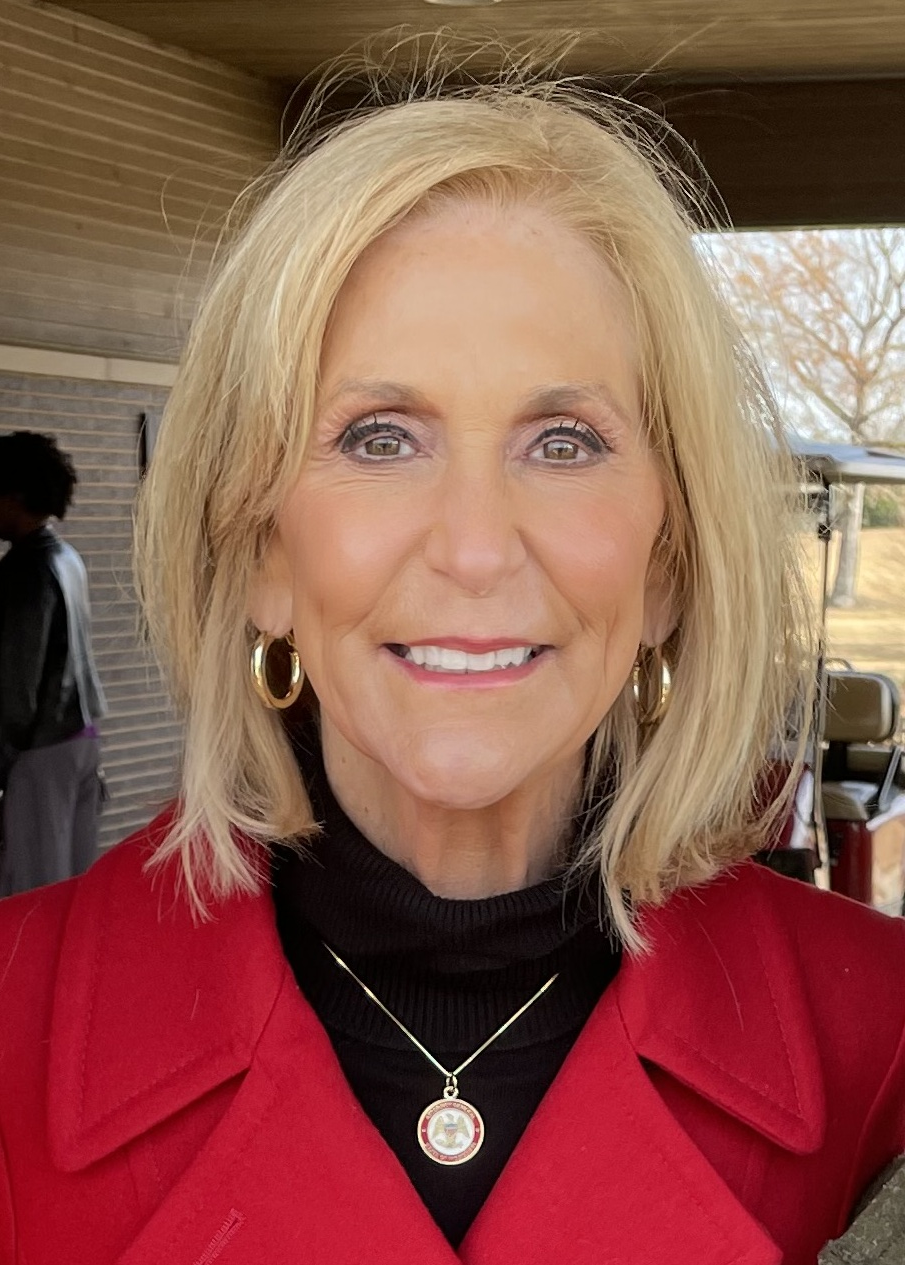

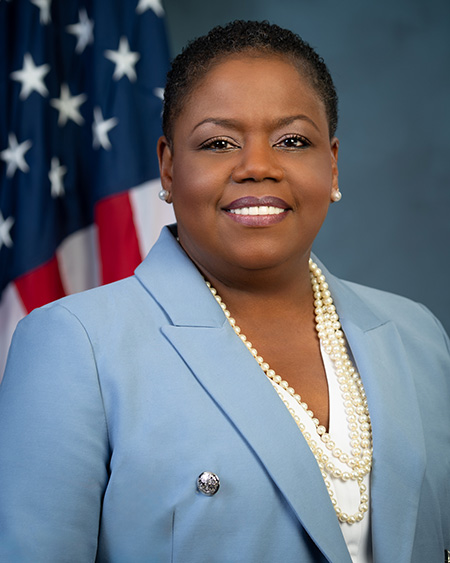
Nominee	Lynn Fitch	Jennifer Riley Collins
Party	Republican	Democratic
Popular vote	507,468	370,068
Percentage	57.83%	42.17%
- Fitch: 50–60% 60–70% 70–80% 80–90% >90% Collins: 50–60% 60–70% 70–80% 80–90% >90%
Attorney General before election
Jim Hood
Democratic
Elected Attorney General
Lynn Fitch
Republican

The 2019 Mississippi Attorney General election was held on November 5, 2019, to elect the Attorney General of Mississippi. Incumbent Jim Hood declined to seek re-election to a fifth term, instead running unsuccessfully for Governor. State Treasurer Lynn Fitch won the Republican nomination in a primary runoff against Andy Taggart, and she defeated Democratic nominee Jennifer Riley Collins in the general election. Fitch became the first Republican to hold the office since 1878, as well as the first woman to ever be elected to the position in state history. It also marked the first time in over a century where no members of the Democratic Party held statewide office.

== Republican primary ==
=== Candidates ===
==== Nominee ====
- Lynn Fitch, Treasurer of Mississippi

==== Eliminated in runoff ====
- Andy Taggart, Madison County supervisor

==== Eliminated in primary ====
- Mark Baker, member of the Mississippi House of Representatives from the 74th District

Republican primary results
Party	Candidate	Votes	%
Republican	Lynn Fitch	163,733	44.2
Republican	Andy Taggart	105,689	28.6
Republican	Mark Baker	100,598	27.2
Total votes		370,020	100.0

==== Runoff ====
Republican runoff results
Party	Candidate	Votes	%
Republican	Lynn Fitch	168,278	52.1
Republican	Andy Taggart	154,807	47.9
Total votes		323,085	100.0

== Democratic primary ==
=== Candidates ===
==== Nominee ====
- Jennifer Riley Collins, former director of the American Civil Liberties Union of Mississippi

Declined

- Jim Hood, incumbent Attorney General (Ran for Governor)

==== Results ====
Democratic primary results
Party	Candidate	Votes	%
Democratic	Jennifer Riley Collins	253,042	100.0
Total votes		253,042	100.0

== General election ==
=== Endorsements ===
Jennifer Riley Collins

Organizations

- NARAL Pro-Choice America

=== Predictions ===
Source	Ranking	As of
Cook	Likely R (flip)	October 25, 2019

=== Results ===
2019 Mississippi Attorney General election
Party	Candidate	Votes	%	±%
Republican	Lynn Fitch	507,468	57.83	+13.19
Democratic	Jennifer Riley Collins	370,068	42.17	–13.19
Total votes		877,536	100.00	N/A
Republican gain from Democratic				

==== By county ====
County	Jennifer Riley Collins Democratic		Lynn Fitch Republican		Margin		Total
County	#	%	#	%	#	%	Total
Adams	6,112	57.97%	4,432	42.03%	-1,680	-15.93%	10,544
Alcorn	2,210	19.68%	9,019	80.32%	6,809	60.64%	11,229
Amite	2,098	40.64%	3,064	59.36%	966	18.71%	5,162
Attala	2,376	40.53%	3,486	59.47%	1,110	18.94%	5,862
Benton	894	35.36%	1,634	64.64%	740	29.27%	2,528
Bolivar	6,239	63.66%	3,562	36.34%	-2,677	-27.31%	9,801
Calhoun	1,628	32.22%	3,425	67.78%	1,797	35.56%	5,053
Carroll	1,218	29.76%	2,875	70.24%	1,657	40.48%	4,093
Chickasaw	3,095	48.43%	3,296	51.57%	201	3.15%	6,391
Choctaw	881	29.29%	2,127	70.71%	1,246	41.42%	3,008
Claiborne	3,082	84.81%	552	15.19%	-2,530	-69.62%	3,634
Clarke	2,160	33.90%	4,212	66.10%	2,052	32.20%	6,372
Clay	4,197	57.99%	3,040	42.01%	-1,157	-15.99%	7,237
Coahoma	3,183	67.34%	1,544	32.66%	-1,639	-34.67%	4,727
Copiah	5,150	53.27%	4,518	46.73%	-632	-6.54%	9,668
Covington	2,695	37.59%	4,475	62.41%	1,780	24.83%	7,170
DeSoto	12,381	33.64%	24,422	66.36%	12,041	32.72%	36,803
Forrest	8,701	41.96%	12,036	58.04%	3,335	16.08%	20,737
Franklin	1,296	35.87%	2,317	64.13%	1,021	28.26%	3,613
George	707	13.04%	4,716	86.96%	4,009	73.93%	5,423
Greene	843	20.98%	3,175	79.02%	2,332	58.04%	4,018
Grenada	3,157	43.74%	4,060	56.26%	903	12.51%	7,217
Hancock	2,823	24.21%	8,839	75.79%	6,016	51.59%	11,662
Harrison	16,909	38.18%	27,375	61.82%	10,466	23.63%	44,284
Hinds	53,149	73.74%	18,929	26.26%	-34,220	-47.48%	72,078
Holmes	5,167	81.52%	1,171	18.48%	-3,996	-63.05%	6,338
Humphreys	2,045	71.35%	821	28.65%	-1,224	-42.71%	2,866
Issaquena	259	52.11%	238	47.89%	-21	-4.23%	497
Itawamba	1,179	15.83%	6,267	84.17%	5,088	68.33%	7,446
Jackson	10,933	33.53%	21,675	66.47%	10,742	32.94%	32,608
Jasper	3,008	50.59%	2,938	49.41%	-70	-1.18%	5,946
Jefferson	2,831	86.18%	454	13.82%	-2,377	-72.36%	3,258
Jefferson Davis	2,784	60.53%	1,815	39.47%	-969	-21.07%	4,599
Jones	5,871	27.80%	15,249	72.20%	9,378	44.40%	21,120
Kemper	2,497	61.34%	1,574	38.66%	-923	-22.67%	4,071
Lafayette	6,535	42.66%	8,783	57.34%	2,248	14.68%	15,318
Lamar	4,259	24.52%	13,107	75.48%	8,848	50.95%	17,366
Lauderdale	8,245	39.12%	12,833	60.88%	4,588	21.77%	21,078
Lawrence	1,826	35.73%	3,284	64.27%	1,458	28.53%	5,110
Leake	2,889	42.03%	3,985	57.97%	1,096	15.94%	6,874
Lee	8,603	34.43%	16,384	65.57%	7,781	31.14%	24,987
Leflore	5,228	68.51%	2,403	31.49%	-2,825	-37.02%	7,631
Lincoln	3,604	31.65%	7,783	68.35%	4,179	36.70%	11,387
Lowndes	8,221	46.46%	9,475	53.54%	1,254	7.09%	17,696
Madison	16,420	42.12%	22,563	57.88%	6,143	15.76%	38,983
Marion	2,909	32.97%	5,914	67.03%	3,005	34.06%	8,823
Marshall	4,530	50.50%	4,440	49.50%	-90	-1.00%	8,970
Monroe	4,521	37.12%	7,660	62.88%	3,139	25.77%	12,181
Montgomery	1,611	42.12%	2,214	57.88%	603	15.76%	3,825
Neshoba	2,380	29.38%	5,722	70.62%	3,342	41.25%	8,102
Newton	2,242	30.54%	5,099	69.46%	2,857	38.92%	7,341
Noxubee	2,618	74.27%	907	25.73%	-1,711	-48.54%	3,525
Oktibbeha	6,436	50.99%	6,186	49.01%	-250	-1.98%	12,622
Panola	5,615	47.81%	6,130	52.19%	515	4.38%	11,745
Pearl River	2,441	18.72%	10,598	81.28%	8,157	62.56%	13,039
Perry	1,086	25.16%	3,230	74.84%	2,144	49.68%	4,316
Pike	6,290	49.42%	6,438	50.58%	148	1.16%	12,728
Pontotoc	2,154	22.54%	7,404	77.46%	5,250	54.93%	9,558
Prentiss	2,041	26.55%	5,647	73.45%	3,606	46.90%	7,688
Quitman	1,717	65.58%	901	34.42%	-816	-31.17%	2,618
Rankin	13,036	27.90%	33,688	72.10%	20,652	44.20%	46,724
Scott	3,288	41.97%	4,546	58.03%	1,258	16.06%	7,834
Sharkey	1,037	64.85%	562	35.15%	-475	-29.71%	1,599
Simpson	3,378	36.19%	5,956	63.81%	2,578	27.62%	9,334
Smith	1,559	24.11%	4,906	75.89%	3,347	51.77%	6,465
Stone	1,392	26.75%	3,811	73.25%	2,419	46.49%	5,203
Sunflower	4,264	67.35%	2,067	32.65%	-2,197	-34.70%	6,331
Tallahatchie	2,645	56.69%	2,021	43.31%	-624	-13.37%	4,666
Tate	2,774	33.96%	5,394	66.04%	2,620	32.08%	8,168
Tippah	1,473	20.66%	5,656	79.34%	4,183	58.68%	7,129
Tishomingo	1,294	19.18%	5,454	80.82%	4,160	61.65%	6,748
Tunica	1,593	70.71%	660	29.29%	-933	-41.41%	2,253
Union	1,654	18.36%	7,355	81.64%	5,701	63.28%	9,009
Walthall	1,952	40.85%	2,827	59.15%	875	18.31%	4,779
Warren	6,850	48.04%	7,408	51.96%	558	3.91%	14,258
Washington	8,174	68.63%	3,736	31.37%	-4,438	-37.26%	11,910
Wayne	2,840	38.85%	4,470	61.15%	1,630	22.30%	7,310
Webster	871	21.37%	3,204	78.63%	2,333	57.25%	4,075
Wilkinson	2,345	67.99%	1,104	32.01%	-1,241	-35.98%	3,449
Winston	2,892	44.29%	3,638	55.71%	746	11.42%	6,530
Yalobusha	2,301	45.05%	2,807	54.95%	506	9.91%	5,108
Yazoo	4,277	53.11%	3,776	46.89%	-501	-6.22%	8,053
Totals	370,068	42.17%	507,468	57.83%	137,400	15.66%	877,536

Counties that flipped from Democratic to Republican

- Alcorn (largest city: Corinth)
- Amite (largest city: Gloster)
- Attala (largest city: Kosciusko)
- Benton (largest municipality: Ashland)
- Calhoun (largest city: Bruce)
- Carroll (largest city: Vaiden)
- Chickasaw (largest city: Houston)
- Choctaw (largest city: Ackerman)
- Clarke (largest city: Quitman)
- Covington (largest city: Collins)
- Forrest (largest city: Hattiesburg)
- Franklin (largest city: Bude)
- Grenada (largest city: Grenada)
- Itawamba (largest city: Fulton)
- Lafayette (largest city: Oxford)
- Lauderdale (largest city: Meridian)
- Lawrence (largest city: Monticello)
- Leake (largest city: Carthage)
- Lowndes (largest city: Columbus)
- Monroe (largest city: Amory)
- Montgomery (largest city: Winona)
- Panola (largest city: Batesville)
- Perry (largest city: Richton)
- Pike (largest city: McComb)
- Pontotoc (largest city: Pontotoc)
- Prentiss (largest city: Booneville)
- Scott (largest city: Forest)
- Simpson (largest city: Magee)
- Tate (largest city: Senatobia)
- Tippah (largest city: Ripley)
- Union (largest city: New Albany)
- Walthall (largest city: Tylertown)
- Warren (largest city: Vicksburg)
- Wayne (largest city: Waynesboro)
- Webster (largest city: Eupora)
- Winston (largest city: Louisville)
- Yalobusha (largest city: Water Valley)

==== By congressional district ====
Fitch won three of four congressional districts.

District	Riley Collins	Fitch	Representative
1st	34%	66%	Trent Kelly
2nd	64%	36%	Bennie Thompson
3rd	39%	61%	Michael Guest
4th	32%	68%	Steven Palazzo
