= Jennifer Riley Collins =

American attorney and politician

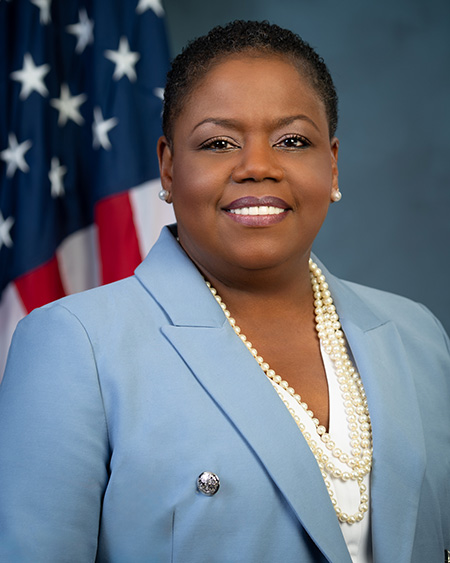

Personal details
- Born: Jennifer Riley; November 10, 1965 (age 60) Meridian, Mississippi, U.S.
- Party: Democratic
- Education: Alcorn State University (BA); University of Central Texas (MCJ); Mississippi College (JD)

Military service
- Allegiance: United States
- Branch/service: United States Army
- Years of service: 1985–2017
- Rank: Colonel

Jennifer A. Riley Collins (born November 10, 1965) is an American attorney and politician.

Riley Collins is from Meridian, Mississippi. She graduated from Meridian High School and earned her bachelor's degree from Alcorn State University in 1987. She earned a master's degree in criminal justice administration in 1993 from the University of Central Texas and a Juris Doctor in 1999 from the Mississippi College School of Law.

Riley Collins enlisted in the United States Army in 1985, and served as an intelligence officer on active duty for 14 years. She spent another 18 years in the United States National Guard and United States Army Reserve. She retired at the rank of colonel in 2017. She also served as the executive director of the Mississippi chapter of the American Civil Liberties Union from 2013 to 2019. In the 2019 election, she ran for Attorney General of Mississippi. She lost to Lynn Fitch, the Mississippi State Treasurer, which ended the Democratic Party's streak of holding the office since 1878.

In February 2020, Riley Collins became the county administrator for Hinds County.

Party political offices
Preceded by Jim Hood	Democratic nominee for Attorney General of Mississippi; 2019	Succeeded by Greta Kemp Martin
