= Lynn Fitch =

American politician (born 1961)

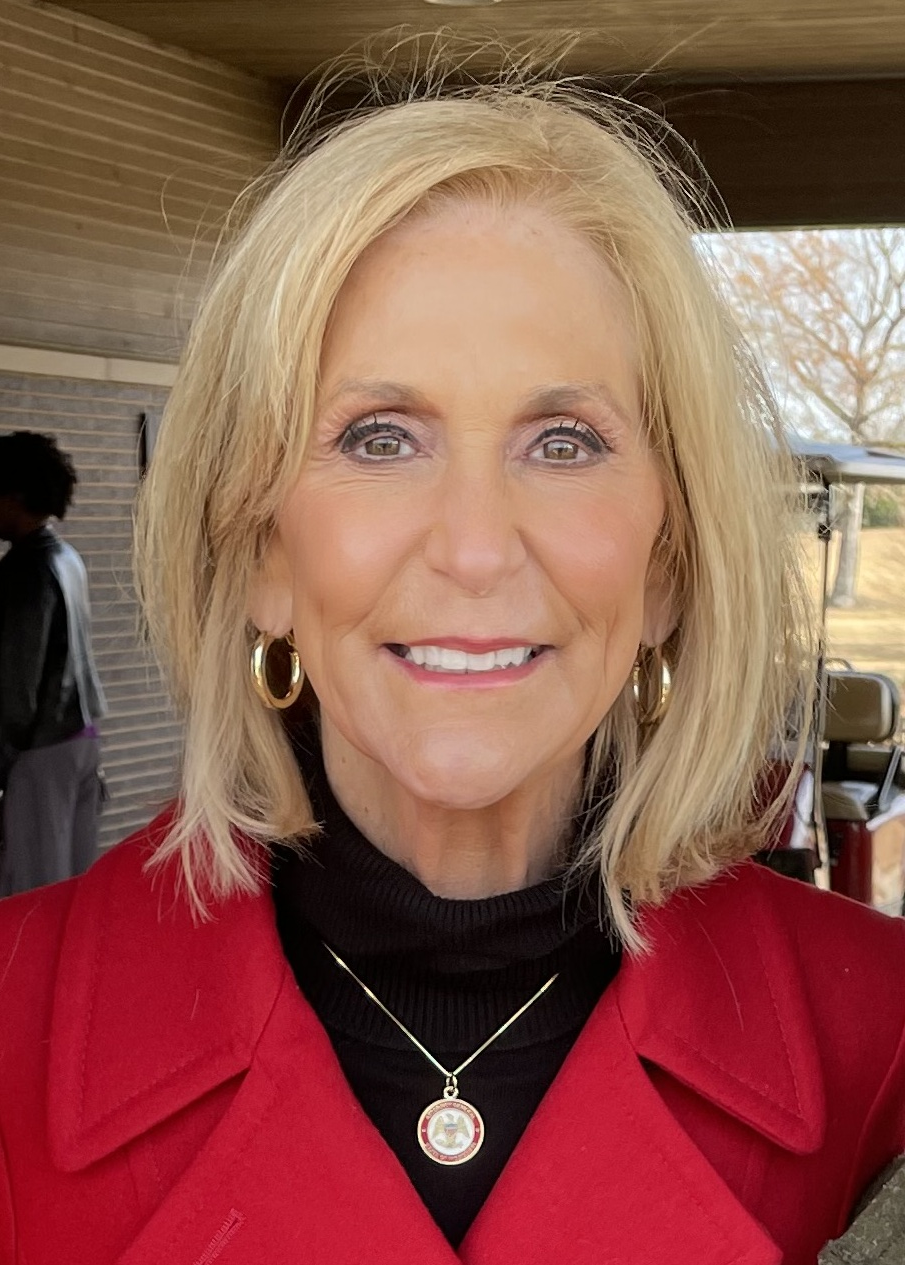
- Fitch in 2024

40th Attorney General of Mississippi
- Incumbent
- Assumed office January 14, 2020
- Governor: Tate Reeves
- Preceded by: Jim Hood

54th Treasurer of Mississippi
- In office January 5, 2012 – January 14, 2020
- Governor: Phil Bryant
- Preceded by: Tate Reeves
- Succeeded by: David McRae

Personal details
- Born: October 5, 1961 (age 65) Holly Springs, Mississippi, U.S.
- Party: Republican
- Education: University of Mississippi (BA, JD)
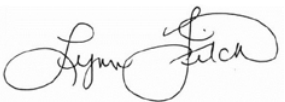
- Signature
- Fitch's voice Fitch on anti-conservative censorship and Section 230. Recorded September 23, 2020

Lynn Fitch (born October 5, 1961) is an American lawyer and politician serving as the 40th Mississippi Attorney General since 2020. She is the first woman to serve in the role and the first Republican since 1878. Previously, she was the 54th State Treasurer of Mississippi from 2012 to 2020.

She is currently a candidate for Governor of Mississippi in the 2027 election.

== Personal life and early career ==
Fitch is a native of Marshall County, Mississippi, and grew up in Holly Springs, Mississippi. She attended University of Mississippi and in five years earned a Bachelor of Business Administration and a Juris Doctor. She began practicing law at 23 on the staff of Attorney General Ed Pittman.

Fitch has worked as a bond lawyer, counsel for the Mississippi House of Representatives Ways and Means Committee, a special assistant attorney general with the Mississippi Attorney General's office, and as deputy executive director at the Mississippi Department of Employment Security. In 2009, Fitch was appointed the executive director of the Mississippi State Personnel Board by Governor Haley Barbour.

== Political career ==
=== State Treasurer of Mississippi ===
A Republican, Fitch announced her campaign for State Treasurer of Mississippi in February 2011. She defeated candidate Lucien Smith in the primary and state senator Lee Yancey in a runoff election for the Republican nomination on August 23, 2011. She went on to defeat Democrat Connie Moran in the November 8, 2011 general election with 59 percent of the vote.

=== Mississippi Attorney General ===
Fitch announced her candidacy for Attorney General of Mississippi on March 14, 2018. In the Republican primary for this office, she defeated State Representative Mark Baker from Brandon, and Andy Taggart, former Chief of Staff to Governor Kirk Fordice and former Madison County Supervisor. Having defeated Democratic candidate Jennifer Riley Collins in the general election, Fitch is the first woman to serve as the state's Attorney General and the first Republican to serve in the office since 1878. She was sworn into office on January 9, 2020.

Fitch's step-mother has also accused Fitch in court filings of using the Attorney General's Office to intimidate her while the step-mother's husband was ill.

After Joe Biden won the 2020 election and Donald Trump refused to concede while he and his allies made claims of fraud, Fitch joined in the lawsuit seeking to overturn the 2020 election.

In 2021, in Dobbs v. Jackson Women's Health Organization, she requested that the Supreme Court overturn Roe v. Wade, a 1970s landmark abortion case. She called Roe v. Wade "egregiously wrong" and argued that the Court should allow a new Mississippi state law banning abortions after 15 weeks to come into effect. Fitch has argued that a ban on abortion would empower women and that abortion prevents women from reaching their full potential. Oral argument on behalf of Mississippi was delivered by Fitch's solicitor general, Scott Stewart. Outside the Supreme Court, the attorney general's office hosted a rally entitled "Empower Women Promote Life." In the months leading up to the oral arguments in the Dobbs case, Fitch authored a series of op-eds arguing against abortion. Her writing was published in the Wall Street Journal, USA Today, Dallas Morning News, The Washington Post, and (together with Monica Sparks, President of Democrats for Life of America) The Hill. Under Fitch, the Mississippi AG's office contracted to pay a D.C. law firm, as well as a Birmingham, Alabama public relations firm and an Alexandria, Virginia-based public relations consultant, up to $558,000 to support her efforts to defend Mississippi laws restricting abortion access.

In 2023, Fitch declined to defend Mississippi's long-standing vaccination requirements against lawsuits by anti-vaccine groups. Mississippi's vaccine requirements had resulted in one of the highest vaccination rates in the United States, with 99% of kindergarteners being immunized. Fitch argued that federal court wasn’t the place for this fight because a state law passed in 2014, which allowed businesses to refuse services based on religious beliefs, could be applied to the vaccine law, too.

As Attorney General of Mississippi, Fitch has been accused of awarding contracts to campaign donors in what appears to be a "pay-to-play" arrangement.

On June 22, 2026, an agreement would be made with Roblox and Fitch. The settlement requires Roblox to pay $9,000,000 to fund digital literacy education created. It will also include a fully-funded parental empowerment and education program. The settlement requires damages of $5,000,000 to guarantee Roblox doesn't breach the settlement.

In October 2026, Fitch "found the use of force was justified" in a Senatobia officer's killing of Black 1-year-old Kohen Wiley. The Wiley family's lawyer, Benjamin Crump, who had previously presented an autopsy which contradicted the original police report, criticized this decision on the grounds that the body camera footage of the shooting has not been released.

Fitch is affiliated with the National Association of Attorneys General.

== 2027 gubernatorial campaign ==
On August 4, 2026, Fitch announced her candidacy for the 2027 Mississippi gubernatorial election. If elected, she will become Mississippi’s first female governor.

== Electoral history ==
Mississippi Treasurer Republican Primary Election, 2011
Party	Candidate	Votes	%
Republican	Lynn Fitch	104,287	37.65
Republican	Lee Yancey	92,653	33.45
Republican	Lucien Smith	80,054	28.90

Mississippi Treasurer Republican Primary Runoff Election, 2011
Party	Candidate	Votes	%
Republican	Lynn Fitch	82,930	53.16
Republican	Lee Yancey	73,076	46.84

Mississippi Treasurer Election, 2011
Party	Candidate	Votes	%
Republican	Lynn Fitch	513,132	58.79
Democratic	Connie Moran	333,267	38.18
Reform	Shawn O'Hara	26,421	3.03

Mississippi Treasurer Republican Primary Election, 2015
Party	Candidate	Votes	%
Republican	Lynn Fitch (inc.)	154,492	57.67
Republican	David McRae	113,411	42.33

Mississippi Treasurer Election, 2015
Party	Candidate	Votes	%
Republican	Lynn Fitch (inc.)	511,465	79.24
Reform	Viola McFarland	134,014	20.76

Party political offices
Preceded by Tate Reeves	Republican nominee for Mississippi State Treasurer; 2011, 2015	Succeeded by David McRae
Preceded by D. Michael Hurst Jr.	Republican nominee for Attorney General of Mississippi; 2019, 2023	Most recent
Political offices
Preceded by Tate Reeves	Treasurer of Mississippi; 2012–2020	Succeeded by David McRae
Legal offices
Preceded by Jim Hood	Attorney General of Mississippi; 2020–present	Incumbent
