= 2019 Mississippi elections =

- November 5, 2019

A general election was held in the U.S. state of Mississippi on November 5, 2019. All executive offices in the state were up for election. The primary election was held on August 6, 2019, and runoff elections were held on August 27, 2019. Although the Democrats came close to winning the governorship, they ultimately failed to do so. In addition, they lost the sole statewide office they have held since 1878: the Attorney General.

== Lieutenant governor ==
Incumbent Republican lieutenant governor Tate Reeves, who was reelected in 2015 with 60%, was ineligible to run for a third term due to term limits and successfully ran for governor instead.

== Secretary of State ==
Mississippi Secretary of State election, 2019
- November 5, 2019

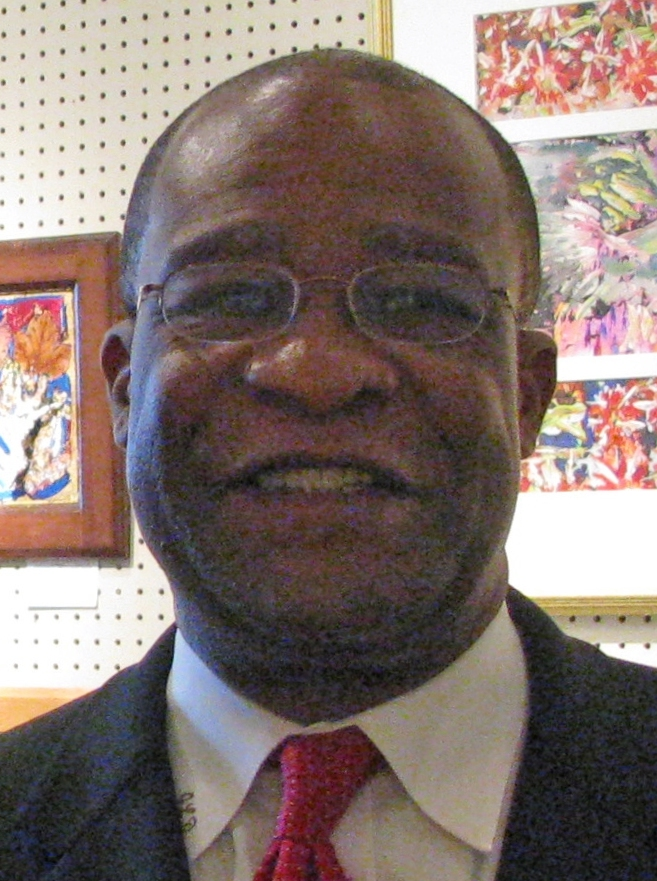
Nominee	Michael Watson	Johnny DuPree
Party	Republican	Democratic
Electoral vote	79	43
Popular vote	511,249	357,806
Percentage	58.83%	41.17%
- Watson: 50–60% 60–70% 70–80% 80–90% DuPree: 50–60% 60–70% 70–80% 80–90%
Secretary of State before election
Delbert Hosemann
Republican
Elected Secretary of State
Michael Watson
Republican

Incumbent Republican secretary of state Delbert Hosemann declined to run for a fourth term and instead successfully ran for lieutenant governor.

=== Democratic primary ===
==== Candidates ====
- Johnny DuPree, former mayor of Hattiesburg and nominee for Governor of Mississippi in 2011
- Maryra Hunt

==== Results ====
Democratic primary results
Party	Candidate	Votes	%
Democratic	Johnny DuPree	200,423	71.7
Democratic	Maryra Hunt	79,201	28.3
Total votes		279,624	100.0

=== Republican primary ===
==== Candidates ====
- Sam Britton, commissioner for the Southern District of the Mississippi Public Service Commission
- Michael Watson, member of the Mississippi State Senate from the 51st District

==== Results ====
Republican primary results
Party	Candidate	Votes	%
Republican	Michael Watson	187,054	52.8
Republican	Sam Britton	167,440	47.2
Total votes		354,494	100.0

=== General election ===
==== Results ====
2019 Mississippi Secretary of State election
Party	Candidate	Votes	%
Republican	Michael Watson	511,249	58.83
Democratic	Johnny DuPree	357,806	41.17
Total votes		869,055	100.00
Republican hold			

== Attorney general ==
Incumbent Democratic attorney general Jim Hood declined to run for a fifth term and instead ran for governor. Republican state treasurer Lynn Fitch defeated Democrat Jennifer Collins to become the first Republican attorney general since the Reconstruction era.

=== Democratic primary ===
==== Candidates ====
- Jennifer Riley Collins, former director of the American Civil Liberties Union of Mississippi

==== Results ====
Democratic primary results
Party	Candidate	Votes	%
Democratic	Jennifer Riley Collins	253,042	100.0
Total votes		253,042	100.0

=== Republican primary ===
==== Candidates ====
- Mark Baker, member of the Mississippi House of Representatives from the 74th District
- Lynn Fitch, Treasurer of Mississippi
- Andy Taggart, Madison County supervisor

==== Results ====
Republican primary results
Party	Candidate	Votes	%
Republican	Lynn Fitch	163,733	44.2
Republican	Andy Taggart	105,689	28.6
Republican	Mark Baker	100,598	27.2
Total votes		370,020	100.0

==== Runoff ====
Republican runoff results
Party	Candidate	Votes	%
Republican	Lynn Fitch	168,278	52.1
Republican	Andy Taggart	154,807	47.9
Total votes		323,085	100.0

=== General election ===
==== Results ====
2019 Mississippi Attorney General election
Party	Candidate	Votes	%
Republican	Lynn Fitch	507,468	57.83
Democratic	Jennifer Riley Collins	370,068	42.17
Total votes		877,536	100.00
Republican gain from Democratic			

== State Auditor ==
Mississippi State Auditor election, 2019
- November 5, 2019
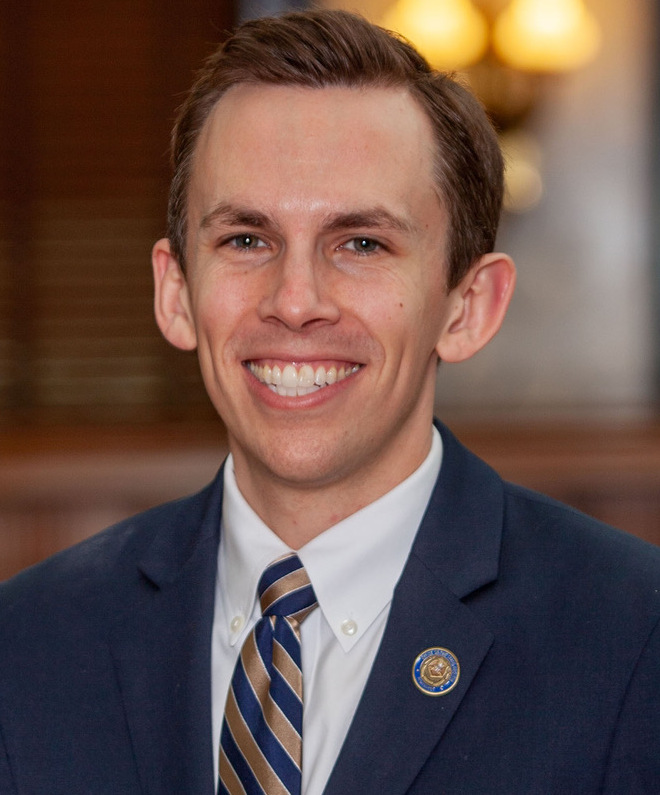
Nominee	Shad White
Party	Republican
Electoral vote	122
Popular vote	656,902
Percentage	100%
- County results White: 90–100%
State Auditor before election
Shad White
Republican
Elected State Auditor
Shad White
Republican

=== Republican primary ===
==== Candidates ====
- Shad White, incumbent

==== Results ====
Republican primary results
Party	Candidate	Votes	%
Republican	Shad White (incumbent)	333,530	100.0
Total votes		333,530	100.0

=== General election ===
==== Results ====
2019 Mississippi State Auditor election
Party	Candidate	Votes	%
Republican	Shad White (incumbent)	656,902	100.00
Total votes		656,902	100.00
Republican hold			

== State Treasurer ==
Mississippi State Treasurer election, 2019
- November 5, 2019
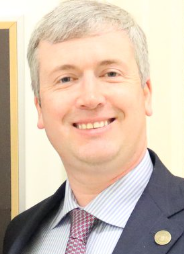

Nominee	David McRae	Addie Lee Green
Party	Republican	Democratic
Electoral vote	80	42
Popular vote	528,899	340,962
Percentage	60.8%	39.2%
- Green: 50–60% 60–70% 70–80% 80–90% >90% McRae: 50–60% 60–70% 70–80% 80–90% >90%
State Treasurer before election
Lynn Fitch
Republican
Elected State Treasurer
David McRae
Republican

Incumbent Republican treasurer Lynn Fitch declined to run for a third term and instead chose to run for attorney general.

=== Democratic primary ===
==== Candidates ====
- Addie Lee Green

==== Results ====
Democratic primary results
Party	Candidate	Votes	%
Democratic	Addie Lee Green	251,591	100.0
Total votes		251,591	100.0

=== Republican primary ===
==== Candidates ====
- Eugene Clarke, member of the Mississippi State Senate from the 22nd District
- David McRae, businessman and candidate for State Treasurer in 2015

==== Results ====
Republican primary results
Party	Candidate	Votes	%
Republican	David McRae	222,610	61.5
Republican	Eugene Clarke	139,345	38.5
Total votes		361,955	100.0

=== General election ===
==== Results ====
2019 Mississippi State Treasurer election
Party	Candidate	Votes	%
Republican	David McRae	528,899	60.8
Democratic	Addie Lee Green	340,962	39.2
Total votes		869,861	100.0
Republican hold			

== Commissioner of Agriculture and Commerce ==
Mississippi Commissioner of Agriculture and Commerce election, 2019
- November 5, 2019
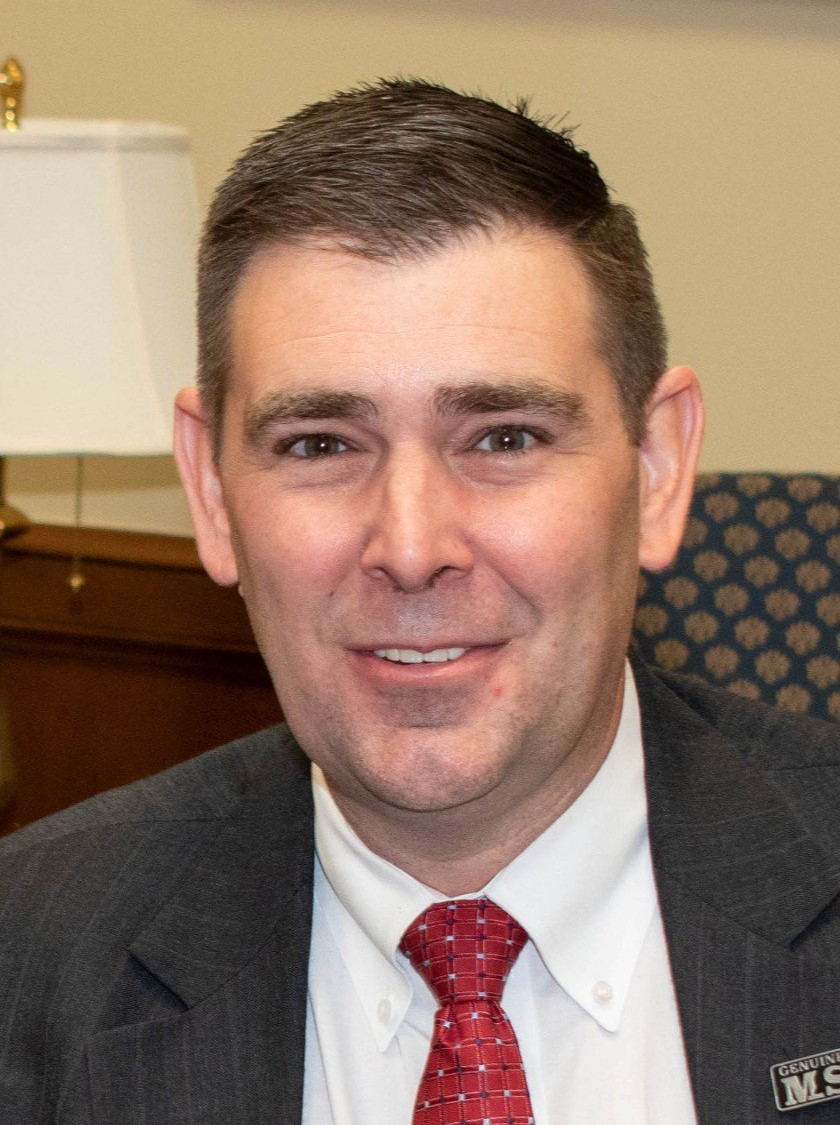

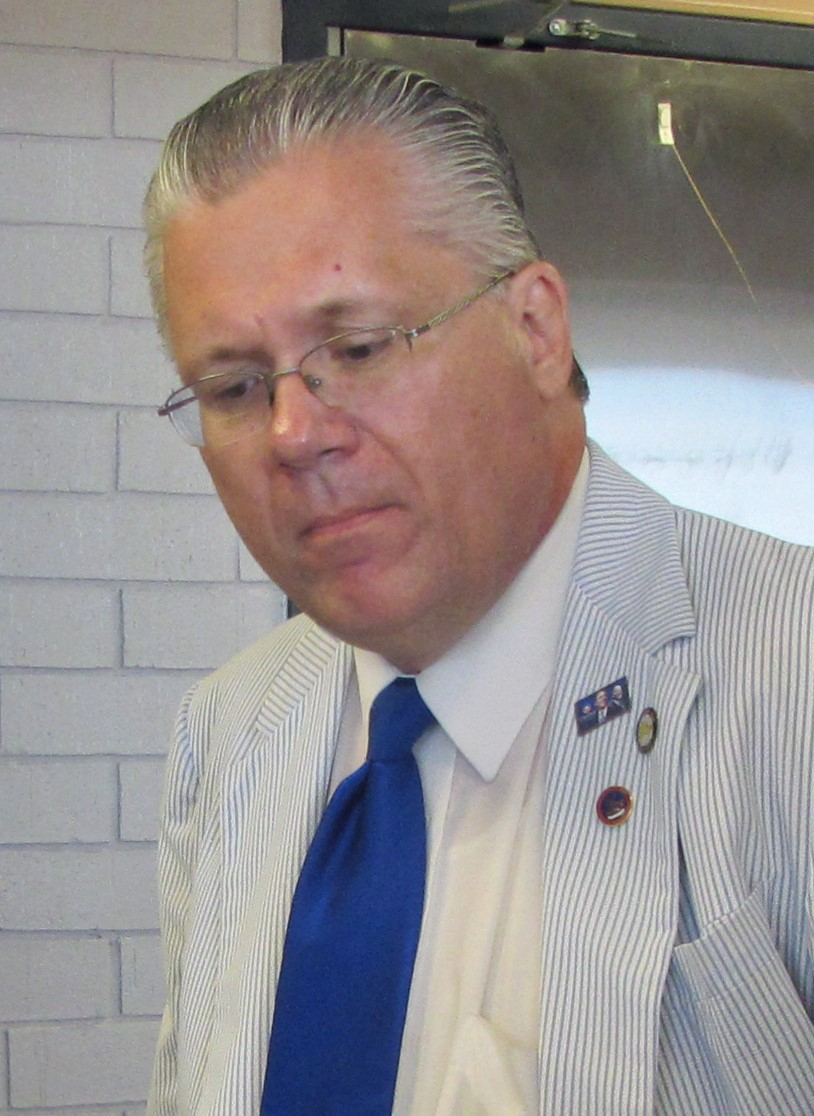
Nominee	Andy Gipson	Rickey Cole
Party	Republican	Democratic
Electoral vote	79	43
Popular vote	509,239	358,318
Percentage	58.7%	41.3%
- Cole: 50–60% 60–70% 70–80% 80–90% >90% Gipson: 50–60% 60–70% 70–80% 80–90% >90% Tie 50%
Commissioner of Agriculture and Commerce before election
Andy Gipson
Republican
Elected Commissioner of Agriculture and Commerce
Andy Gipson
Republican

=== Democratic primary ===
==== Candidates ====
- Rickey Cole, former Mississippi Democratic Party Chairman

==== Results ====
Democratic primary results
Party	Candidate	Votes	%
Democratic	Rickey Cole	254,523	100.0
Total votes		254,523	100.0

=== Republican primary ===
==== Candidates ====
- Andy Gipson, incumbent

==== Results ====
Republican primary results
Party	Candidate	Votes	%
Republican	Andy Gipson (incumbent)	342,708	100.0
Total votes		342,708	100.0

=== General election ===
==== Results ====
2019 Mississippi Commissioner of Agriculture and Commerce election
Party	Candidate	Votes	%
Republican	Andy Gipson (incumbent)	509,239	58.7
Democratic	Rickey Cole	358,318	41.3
Total votes		867,557	100.0
Republican hold			

== Commissioner of Insurance ==
Mississippi Commissioner of Insurance election, 2019
- November 5, 2019
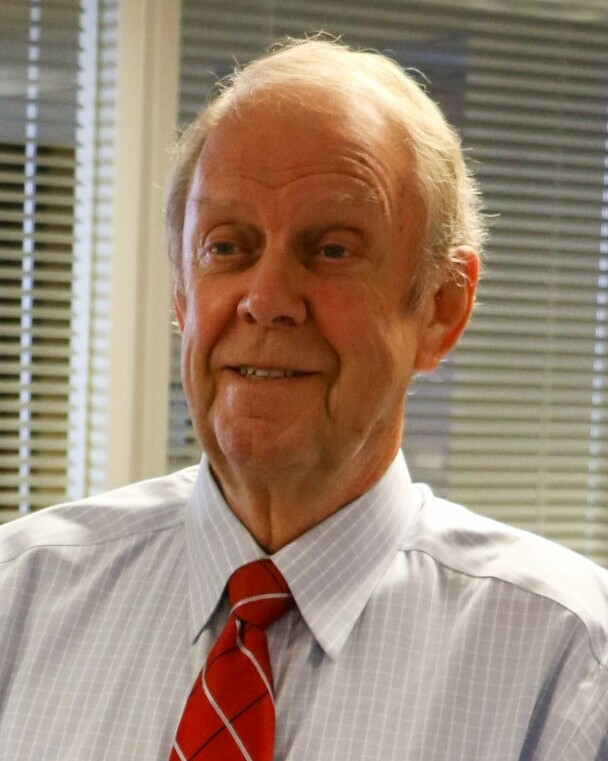

Nominee	Mike Chaney	Robert Amos
Party	Republican	Democratic
Electoral vote	79	43
Popular vote	533,324	337,297
Percentage	61.26%	38.74%
- Amos: 50–60% 60–70% 70–80% 80–90% >90% Chaney: 50–60% 60–70% 70–80% 80–90% >90% Tie 50%
Commissioner of Insurance before election
Mike Chaney
Republican
Elected Commissioner of Insurance
Mike Chaney
Republican

=== Democratic primary ===
==== Candidates ====
- Robert Amos

==== Results ====
Democratic primary results
Party	Candidate	Votes	%
Democratic	Robert Amos	251,664	100.0
Total votes		251,664	100.0

=== Republican primary ===
==== Candidates ====
- Mike Chaney, incumbent

==== Results ====
Republican primary results
Party	Candidate	Votes	%
Republican	Mike Chaney (incumbent)	345,736	100.0
Total votes		345,736	100.0

=== General election ===
==== Results ====
2019 Mississippi Insurance Commissioner election
Party	Candidate	Votes	%
Republican	Mike Chaney (incumbent)	533,324	61.26
Democratic	Robert Amos	337,297	38.74
Total votes		870,621	100.00
Republican hold			

== Public Service Commission ==
Mississippi Public Service Commissioner, Northern District election, 2019
- November 5, 2019
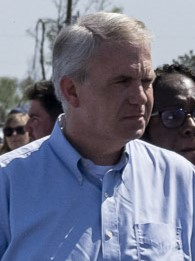
Nominee	Brandon Presley
Party	Democratic
Popular vote	222,167
Percentage	100%
Northern District Commissioner before election
Brandon Presley
Democratic
Elected Northern District Commissioner
Brandon Presley
Democratic

=== Northern District ===
==== Democratic primary ====
===== Candidates =====
- Brandon Presley, incumbent

===== Results =====
Democratic primary results
Party	Candidate	Votes	%
Democratic	Brandon Presley (incumbent)	95,783	100.0
Total votes		95,783	100.0

==== General election ====
===== Results =====
Mississippi Public Service Commissioner Northern District election, 2019
Party	Candidate	Votes	%
Democratic	Brandon Presley (incumbent)	222,167	100.0
Total votes		222,167	100.0
Democratic hold			

Mississippi Public Service Commissioner, Central District election, 2019
- November 5, 2019

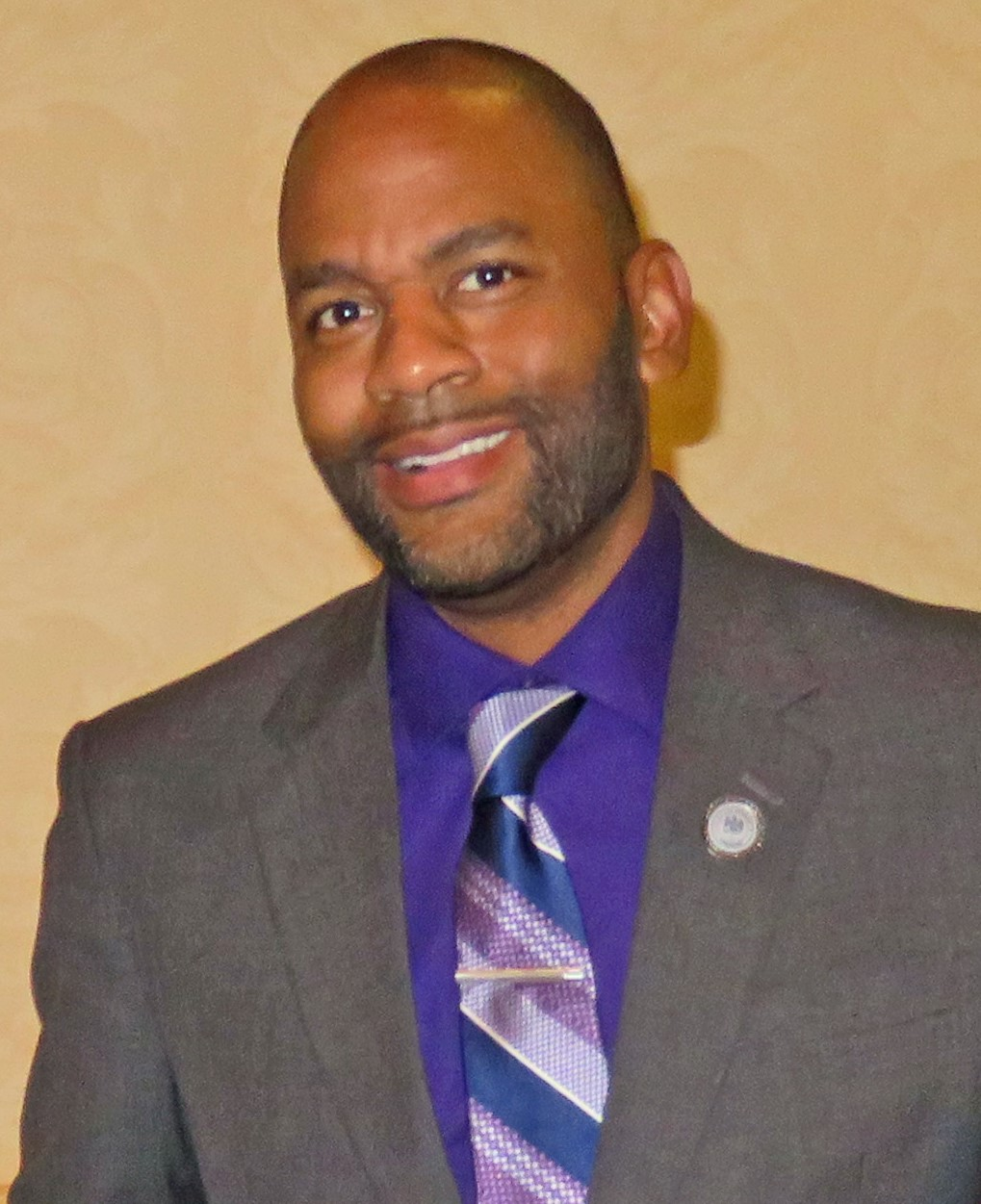
Nominee	Brent Bailey	De'Keither Stamps
Party	Republican	Democratic
Popular vote	146,596	144,574
Percentage	50.3%	49.7%
- County results Bailey: 50–60% 60–70% 70–80% Stamps: 50–60% 60–70% 70–80% 80–90%
Central District Commissioner before election
Cecil Brown
Democratic
Elected Central District Commissioner
Brent Bailey
Republican

=== Central District ===
==== Democratic primary ====
===== Candidates =====
- Dorothy "Dot" Benford, activist
- Ryan Brown, deputy Public Service Commissioner for the Central District (2016−2019)
- Bruce Burton, candidate for Central District in 2011 and 2015
- De'Keither Stamps, member of Jackson City Council (2013−2020)

===== Results =====
Democratic primary results
Party	Candidate	Votes	%
Democratic	De'Keither Stamps	42,967	39.5
Democratic	Dorothy Benford	36,641	33.7
Democratic	Ryan Brown	16,989	15.6
Democratic	Bruce Burton	12,157	11.2
Total votes		108,754	100.0

===== Runoff =====
Democratic primary runoff results
Party	Candidate	Votes	%
Democratic	De'Keither Stamps	38,314	58.8
Democratic	Dorothy Benford	26,864	41.2
Total votes		65,178	100.0

==== Republican primary ====
===== Candidates =====
- Brent Bailey
- Nic Lott

===== Results =====
Republican primary results
Party	Candidate	Votes	%
Republican	Brent Bailey	73,726	74.4
Republican	Nic Lott	25,363	25.6
Total votes		99,089	100.0

==== General election ====
===== Results =====
Mississippi Public Service Commissioner Central District election, 2019
Party	Candidate	Votes	%
Republican	Brent Bailey	146,596	50.3
Democratic	De'Keither Stamps	144,574	49.7
Total votes		291,170	100.0
Republican gain from Democratic			

Mississippi Public Service Commissioner, Southern District election, 2019
- November 5, 2019
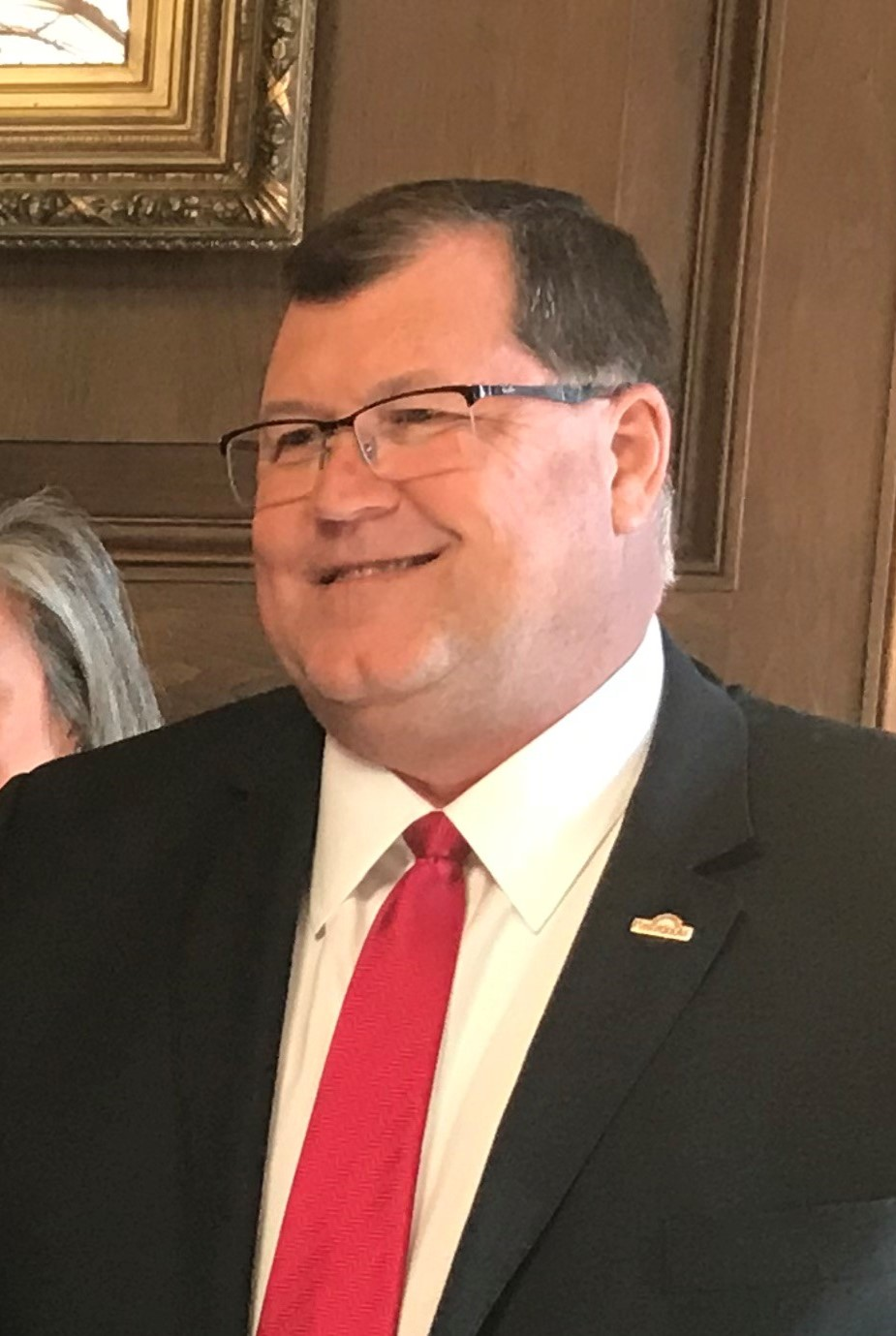

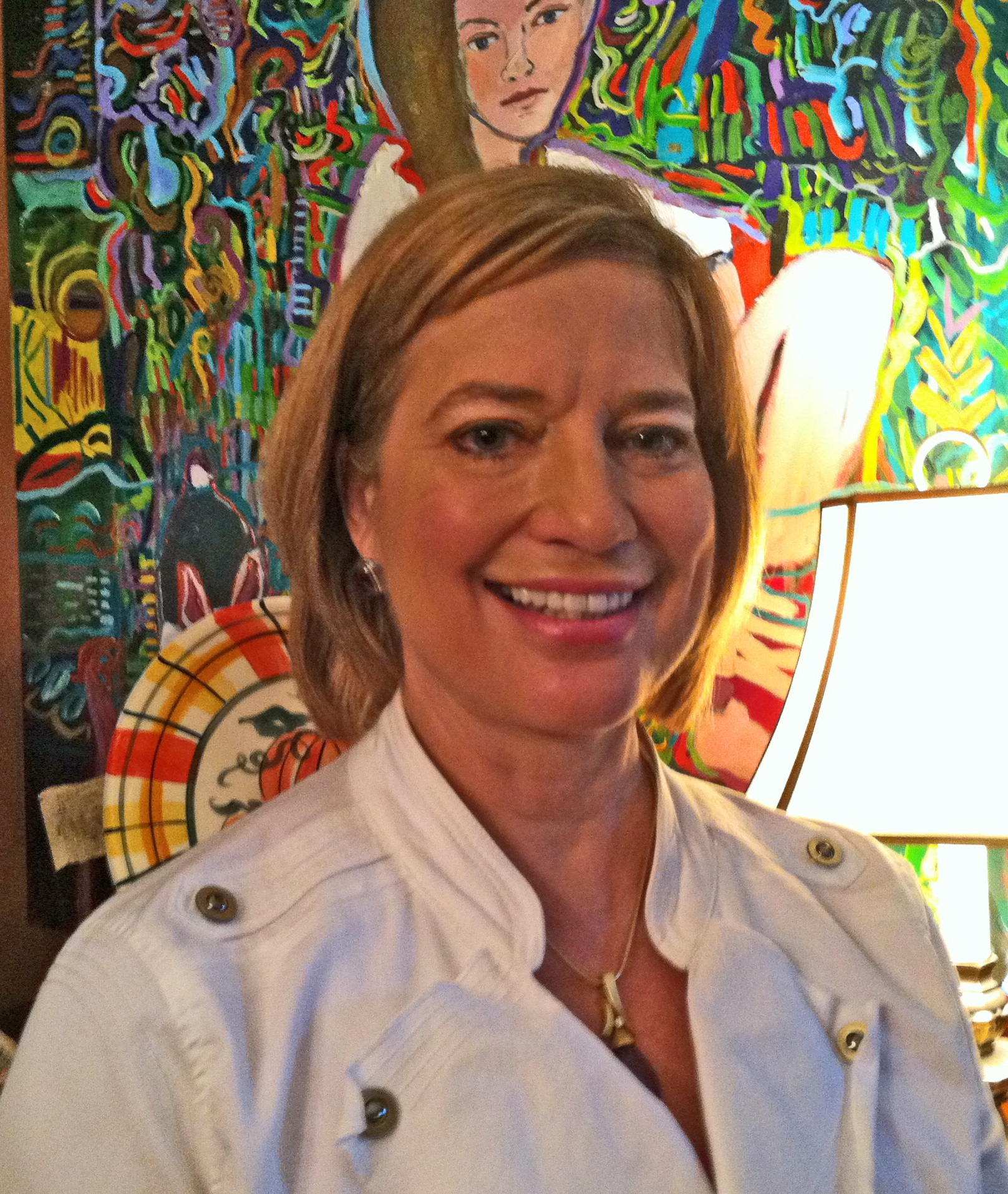
Nominee	Dane Maxwell	Connie Moran
Party	Republican	Democratic
Popular vote	181,083	108,074
Percentage	62.6%	37.4%
- County results Maxwell: 50–60% 60–70% 70–80% 80–90% Moran: 50–60% 60–70%
Southern District Commissioner before election
Sam Britton
Republican
Elected Southern District Commissioner
Dane Maxwell
Republican

=== Southern District ===
==== Democratic primary ====
===== Candidates =====
- Connie Moran, former mayor of Ocean Springs
- Sugar Stallings

===== Results =====
Democratic primary results
Party	Candidate	Votes	%
Democratic	Connie Moran	52,957	79.0
Democratic	Sugar Stallings	14,082	21.0
Total votes		67,039	100.0

==== Republican primary ====
===== Candidates =====
- Dane Maxwell, mayor of Pascagoula
- Kelvin Schulz

===== Results =====
Republican primary results
Party	Candidate	Votes	%
Republican	Dane Maxwell	99,495	68.1
Republican	Kelvin Schulz	46,545	31.9
Total votes		146,040	100.0

==== General election ====
===== Results =====
Mississippi Public Service Commissioner Southern District election, 2019
Party	Candidate	Votes	%
Republican	Dane Maxwell	181,083	62.6
Democratic	Connie Moran	108,074	37.4
Total votes		289,157	100.0
Republican hold			

== Transportation Commission ==
Mississippi Transportation Commissioner, Northern District election, 2019
- November 5, 2019
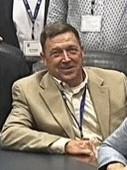

Nominee	John Caldwell	Joey Grist
Party	Republican	Democratic
Popular vote	181,168	105,562
Percentage	63.2%	36.8%
- County results Caldwell: 50–60% 60–70% 70–80% 80–90% Grist: 50–60% 60–70%
Northern District Commissioner before election
Mike Tagert
Republican
Elected Northern District Commissioner
John Caldwell
Republican

=== Northern District ===
==== Democratic primary ====
===== Candidates =====
- Joey Grist, former state representative

===== Results =====
Democratic primary results
Party	Candidate	Votes	%
Democratic	Joey Grist	88,595	100.0
Total votes		88,595	100.0

==== Republican primary ====
===== Candidates =====
- Trey Bowman
- John Caldwell
- E. Allen Hathcock
- Jeremy Martin
- Geoffrey Yoste

===== Results =====
Republican primary results
Party	Candidate	Votes	%
Republican	John Caldwell	32,588	31.4
Republican	Geoffrey Yoste	27,351	26.3
Republican	Trey Bowman	22,581	21.7
Republican	Jeremy Martin	17,836	17.2
Republican	E. Allen Hathcock	3,523	3.4
Total votes		103,879	100.0

===== Runoff =====
Republican primary runoff results
Party	Candidate	Votes	%
Republican	John Caldwell	49,950	56.3
Republican	Geoffrey Yoste	38,803	43.7
Total votes		88,753	100.0

==== General election ====
===== Results =====
Mississippi Transportation Commissioner Northern District election, 2019
Party	Candidate	Votes	%
Republican	John Caldwell	181,168	63.2
Democratic	Joey Grist	105,562	36.8
Total votes		286,730	100.0
Republican hold			

Mississippi Transportation Commissioner, Central District election, 2019
- November 5, 2019
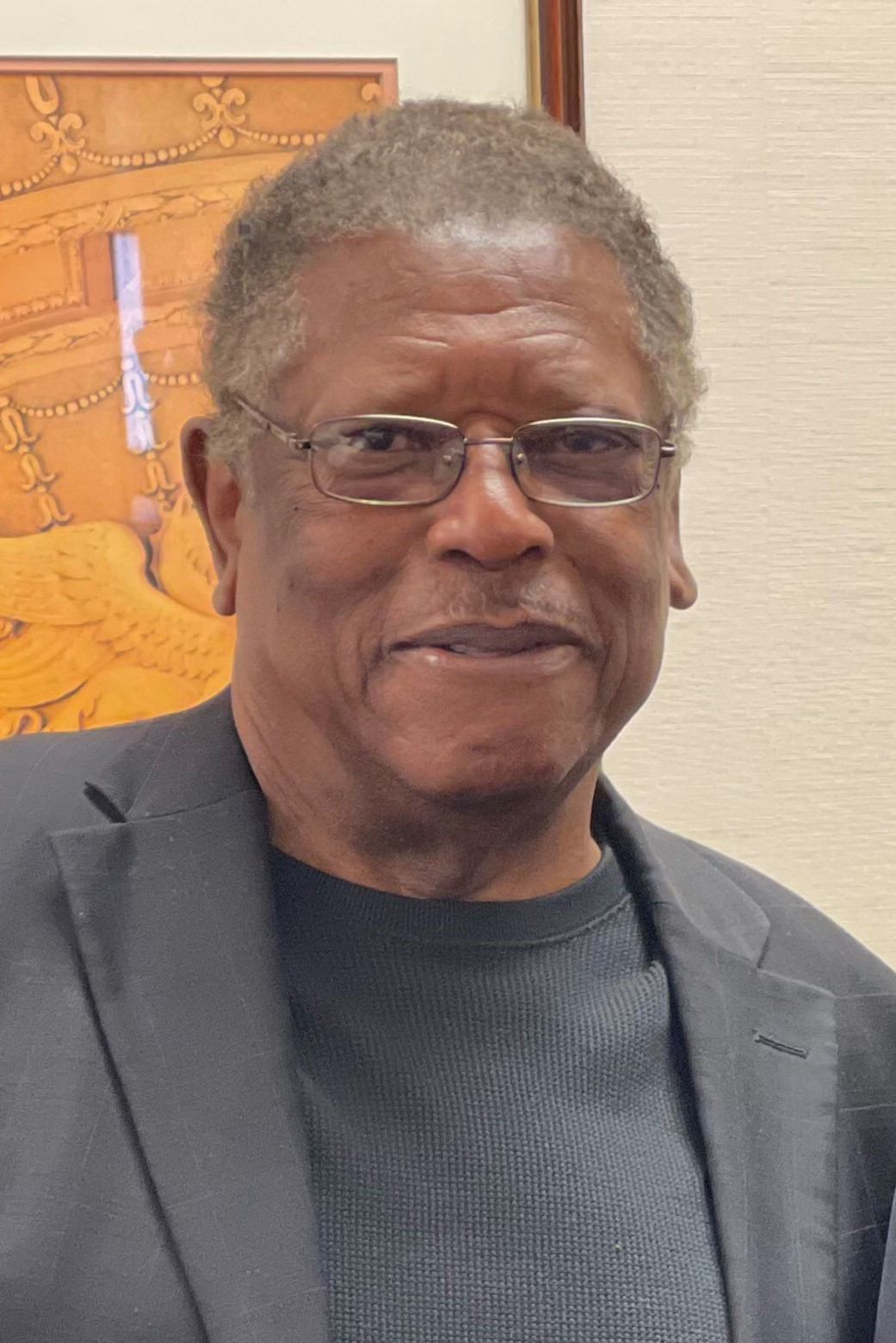

Nominee	Willie Simmons	Butch Lee
Party	Democratic	Republican
Popular vote	149,573	143,003
Percentage	51.1%	48.9%
- County results Simmons: 50–60% 60–70% 70–80% 80–90% Lee: 50–60% 60–70% 70–80%
Central District Commissioner before election
Dick Hall
Republican
Elected Central District Commissioner
Willie Simmons
Democratic

=== Central District ===
==== Democratic primary ====
===== Candidates =====
- Willie Simmons, state senator
- Marcus Wallace

==== Results ====
Democratic primary results
Party	Candidate	Votes	%
Democratic	Willie Simmons	66,394	60.3
Democratic	Marcus Wallace	43,673	39.7
Total votes		108,754	100.0

==== Republican primary ====
===== Candidates =====
- Butch Lee
- Ricky Pennington Jr.

===== Results =====
Republican primary results
Party	Candidate	Votes	%
Republican	Butch Lee	63,890	65.2
Republican	Ricky Pennington, Jr.	34,044	34.8
Total votes		97,934	100.0

==== General election ====
===== Results =====
Mississippi Transportation Commissioner Central District election, 2019
Party	Candidate	Votes	%
Democratic	Willie Simmons	149,573	51.1
Republican	Butch Lee	143,003	48.9
Total votes		292,576	100.0
Democratic gain from Republican			

Mississippi Transportation Commissioner, Southern District election, 2019
- November 5, 2019
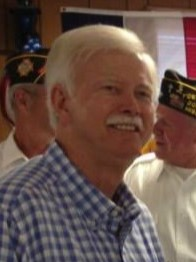
Nominee	Tom King
Party	Republican
Popular vote	234,905
Percentage	100%
Southern District Commissioner before election
Tom King
Republican
Elected Southern District Commissioner
Tom King
Republican

=== Southern District ===
==== Republican primary ====
===== Candidates =====
- Tom King, incumbent
- Tony Smith, state senator
- Chad Toney

==== Results ====
Republican primary results
Party	Candidate	Votes	%
Republican	Tom King (incumbent)	85,390	55.8
Republican	Tony Smith	49,241	32.2
Republican	Chad Toney	18,353	12.0
Total votes		152,984	100.0

==== General election ====
===== Results =====
Mississippi Transportation Commissioner Southern District election, 2019
Party	Candidate	Votes	%
Republican	Tom King (incumbent)	234,905	100.0
Total votes		234,905	100.0
Republican hold			
