= 2015 Mississippi elections =

A general election was held in the U.S. state of Mississippi on November 3, 2015. All of Mississippi's executive officers were up for election. Primary elections were held on August 4, 2015, with primary runoffs to be held on August 25, 2015 if no candidate received a majority in the primary. The filing deadline for primary ballot access was February 27.

== Governor ==
Incumbent Republican Governor Phil Bryant won re-election to a second and final term in office. He was challenged in the Republican primary by Mitch Young.

Retired firefighter Robert Gray, physician Valerie Short and attorney Vicki Slater ran for the Democratic nomination.

== Lieutenant governor ==
Mississippi lieutenant gubernatorial election, 2015
- November 3, 2015
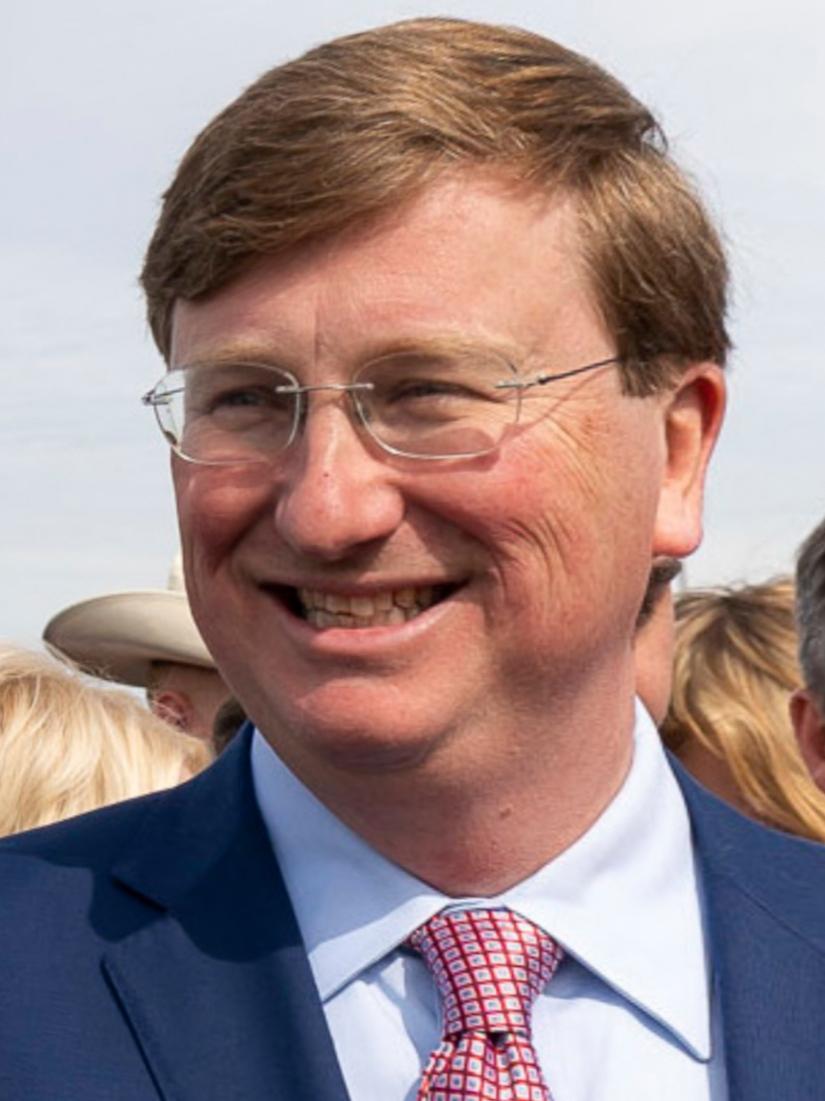

Nominee	Tate Reeves	Tim Johnson
Party	Republican	Democratic
Electoral vote	80	42
Popular vote	433,382	259,008
Percentage	60.34%	36.06%
- Reeves: 50–60% 60–70% 70–80% 80–90% Johnson: 50–60% 60–70% 70–80%
Lieutenant Governor before election
Tate Reeves
Republican
Elected Lieutenant Governor
Tate Reeves
Republican

Incumbent Republican lieutenant governor Tate Reeves ran for re-election to a second term in office. He was challenged in the primary by teacher Alisha Nelson McElhenney. Secretary of State Delbert Hosemann, State Senator and candidate for the U.S. Senate in 2014 Chris McDaniel and State Senator Michael Watson all considered running against Reeves in the Republican primary, but none did so.

Former Republican State Senator and former Republican Madison County Supervisor Tim Johnson won the Democratic primary against actor and candidate for Mayor of Greenwood in 2013 Jelani Barr. Mississippi Public Service Commissioner Brandon Presley was a potential Democratic candidate but instead ran for re-election.

Reeves won the general election against Johnson.

=== Democratic primary ===
==== Candidates ====
- Jelani Barr, actor and candidate for Mayor of Greenwood in 2013
- Tim Johnson, former Republican State Senator and former Madison County Supervisor

==== Results ====
Democratic primary result
Party	Candidate	Votes	%
Democratic	Tim Johnson	221,334	75.83
Democratic	Jelani Barr	70,543	24.17
Total votes		291,877	100

=== Republican primary ===
==== Candidates ====
- Tate Reeves, incumbent
- Alisha Nelson McElhenney, teacher

==== Results ====
Republican primary results
Party	Candidate	Votes	%
Republican	Tate Reeves (incumbent)	226,964	82.54
Republican	Alisha Nelson McElhenney	48,007	17.46
Total votes		274,971	100

=== General election ===
==== Results ====
Mississippi lieutenant gubernatorial election, 2015
Party	Candidate	Votes	%
Republican	Tate Reeves (incumbent)	433,382	60.34
Democratic	Tim Johnson	259,008	36.06
Libertarian	Ron Williams	16,317	2.27
Reform	Rosa B. Williams	9,480	1.31
Total votes		718,187	100
Republican hold			

== Secretary of State ==
Mississippi Secretary of State election, 2015
- November 3, 2015
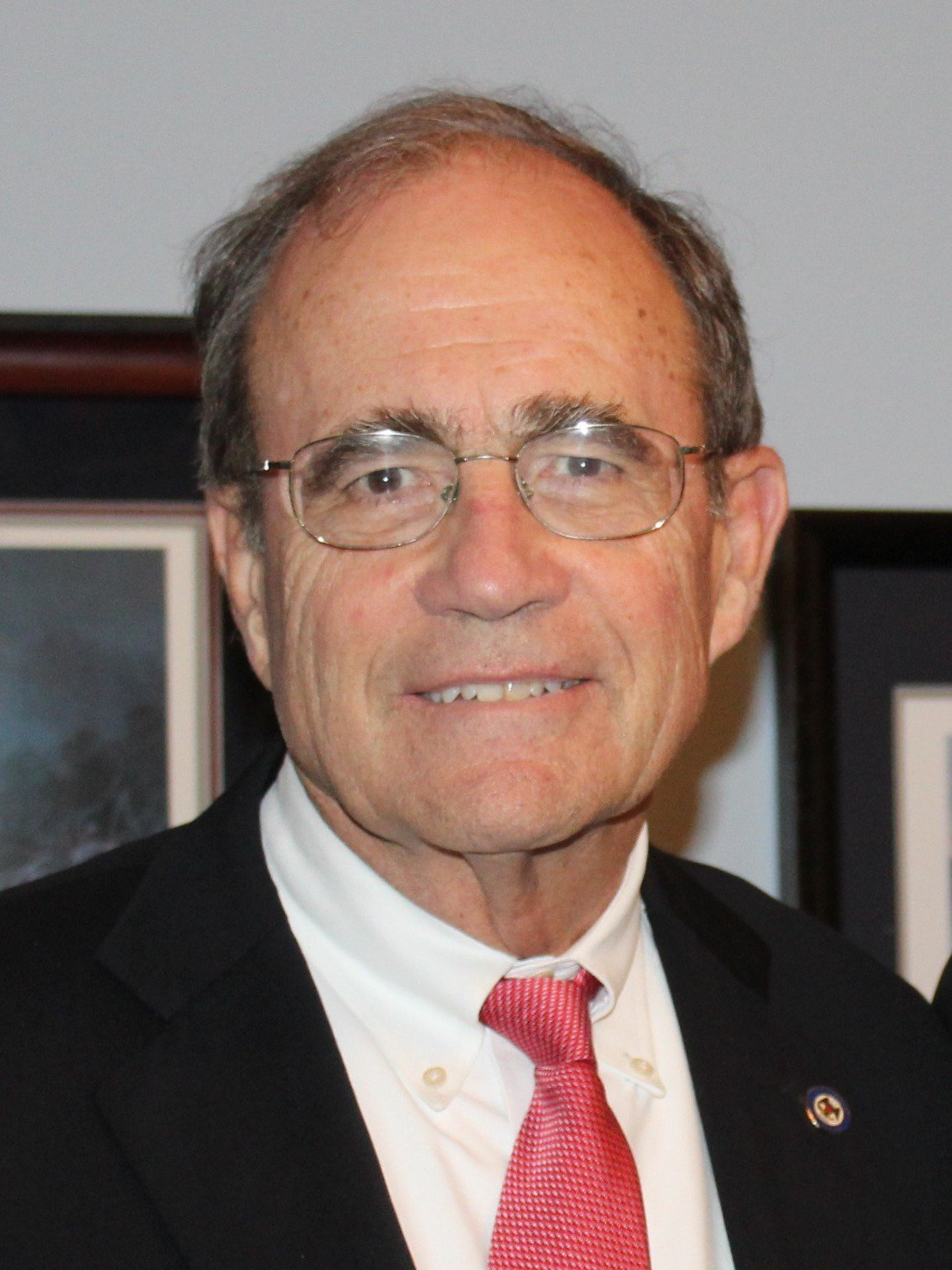

Nominee	Delbert Hosemann	Charles Graham
Party	Republican	Democratic
Electoral vote	80	42
Popular vote	440,048	256,689
Percentage	61.28%	35.75%
- Hosemann: 40–50% 50–60% 60–70% 70–80% 80–90% Graham: 40–50% 50–60% 60–70% 70–80%
Secretary of State before election
Delbert Hosemann
Republican
Elected Secretary of State
Delbert Hosemann
Republican

Incumbent Republican Secretary of State Delbert Hosemann considered running for Lieutenant Governor against Tate Reeves in the Republican primary. However, he chose to run for re-election to a third term in office instead. Potential Republican candidates for Secretary of State included State Senator Michael Watson and Hosemann's former Chief of Staff Cory Wilson, had he chosen to retire.

Retired firefighter Charles Graham ran for the Democrats. State Senator David Blount and former Secretary of State Dick Molpus were potential Democratic candidates, but neither chose to run.

Hosemann won in the general election against Graham.

=== Democratic nomination ===
==== Candidate ====
- Charles Graham, retired firefighter

=== Reform nomination ===
==== Candidate ====
- Randy Walker

=== Republican primary ===
==== Candidate ====
- Delbert Hosemann, incumbent

==== Results ====
Republican primary results
Party	Candidate	Votes	%
Republican	Delbert Hosemann (incumbent)	224,823	100
Total votes		224,823	100

=== General election ===
==== Results ====
Mississippi Secretary of State election, 2015
Party	Candidate	Votes	%
Republican	Delbert Hosemann (incumbent)	440,048	61.28
Democratic	Charles Graham	256,689	35.75
Reform	Randy Walker	21,260	2.96
Total votes		717,997	100
Republican hold			

== Attorney general ==
Incumbent Democratic attorney general Jim Hood had been mentioned as a potential candidate for Governor, but he instead ran for re-election to a fourth term in office.

The only candidate to file for the Republican nomination was Assistant U.S. Attorney Mike Hurst. Attorney Russ Latino considered running but declined to do so. Secretary of State Delbert Hosemann, State Senator Chris McDaniel, State Senator Michael Watson, Jackson County District Attorney Tony Lawrence, Madison and Rankin Counties' District Attorney Michael Guest were all mentioned as potential Republican candidates. State Representative Mark Baker and attorney, author and former Madison County Supervisor Andy Taggart declined to run.

Hood won in the general election against Hurst.

=== Democratic nomination ===
==== Candidate ====
- Jim Hood, incumbent

=== Republican primary ===
==== Candidate ====
- Mike Hurst, Assistant U.S. Attorney

==== Results ====
Republican primary results
Party	Candidate	Votes	%
Republican	Mike Hurst	217,201	100
Total votes		217,201	100

=== General election ===
==== Results ====
Mississippi Attorney General election, 2015
Party	Candidate	Votes	%
Democratic	Jim Hood (incumbent)	400,110	55.35
Republican	Mike Hurst	322,648	44.64
Total votes		722,758	100
Democratic hold			

== State Auditor ==
Mississippi State Auditor election, 2015
- November 3, 2015
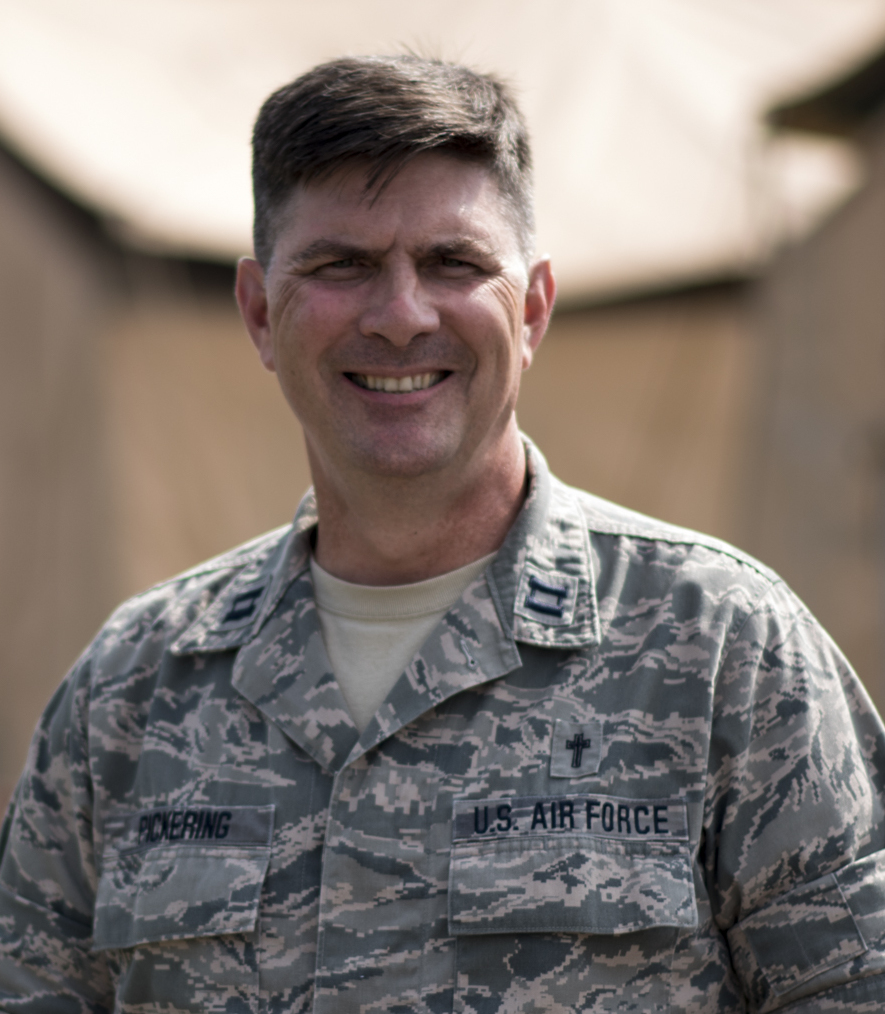

Nominee	Stacey Pickering	Jocelyn Pritchett
Party	Republican	Democratic
Electoral vote	80	42
Popular vote	456,909	248,493
Percentage	63.92%	34.76%
- County results Pickering: 50–60% 60–70% 70–80% 80–90% Pritchett: 40–50% 50–60% 60–70% 70–80%
State Auditor before election
Stacey Pickering
Republican
Elected State Auditor
Stacey Pickering
Republican

Incumbent Republican State Auditor Stacey Pickering ran for re-election to a third term in office. Pickering was challenged in the Republican primary by Mary Hawkins-Butler, the Mayor of Madison. State Senator Michael Watson had considered running but did not do so.

Jocelyn Pritchett, an engineer, ran as a Democrat. Charles Graham, a retired firefighter, had been running for the office, but decided to run for Secretary of State instead.

Pickering won in the general election against Pritchett.

=== Democratic nomination ===
==== Candidate ====
- Jocelyn Pritchett, engineer

=== Reform nomination ===
==== Candidate ====
- Lajena Walley

=== Republican primary ===
==== Candidates ====
- Stacey Pickering, incumbent
- Mary Hawkins-Butler, the Mayor of Madison

==== Results ====
Republican primary results
Party	Candidate	Votes	%
Republican	Stacey Pickering (incumbent)	184,853	67.79
Republican	Mary Hawkins-Butler	87,815	32.21
Total votes		272,668	100

=== General election ===
==== Results ====
Mississippi State Auditor election, 2015
Party	Candidate	Votes	%
Republican	Stacey Pickering (incumbent)	456,909	63.92
Democratic	Jocelyn Pritchett	248,493	34.76
Reform	Lajena Walley	9,385	1.31
Total votes		714,787	100
Republican hold			

== State Treasurer ==
Mississippi State Treasurer election, 2015
- November 3, 2015
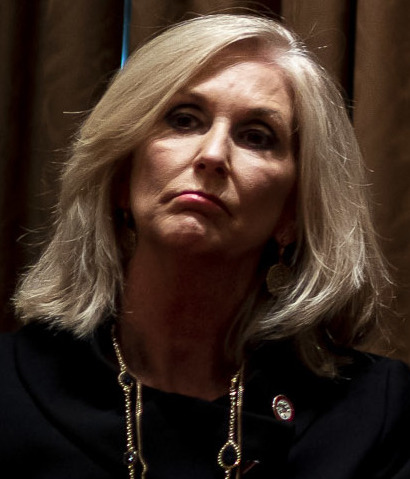

Nominee	Lynn Fitch	Viola V. McFarland
Party	Republican	Reform
Electoral vote	121	1
Popular vote	516,666	135,878
Percentage	79.17%	20.82%
- Fitch: 50–60% 60–70% 70–80% 80–90% >90% McFarland: 50–60%
State Treasurer before election
Lynn Fitch
Republican
Elected State Treasurer
Lynn Fitch
Republican

Incumbent Republican State Treasurer Lynn Fitch ran for re-election to a second term in office. Attorney David McRae, whose family formerly owned the McRae's department store chain, ran against Fitch in the Republican primary. No Democrat filed to run for the office.

Fitch won in the primary and proceed to win in the general election against Reform party candidate Viola McFarland.

=== Reform nomination ===
==== Candidate ====
- Viola McFarland

=== Republican primary ===
==== Candidates ====
- Lynn Fitch, incumbent
- David McRae, attorney

==== Results ====
Republican primary results
Party	Candidate	Votes	%
Republican	Lynn Fitch (incumbent)	155,379	57.57
Republican	David McRae	114,510	42.43
Total votes		269,889	100

=== General election ===
==== Results ====
Mississippi State Treasurer election, 2015
Party	Candidate	Votes	%
Republican	Lynn Fitch (incumbent)	516,666	79.17
Reform	Viola V. McFarland	135,878	20.82
Total votes		652,544	100
Republican hold			

== Commissioner of Agriculture and Commerce ==
Mississippi Commissioner of Agriculture and Commerce election, 2015
- November 3, 2015
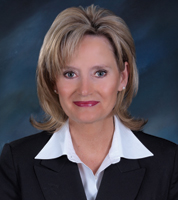

Nominee	Cindy Hyde-Smith	Addie Lee Green
Party	Republican	Democratic
Electoral vote	81	41
Popular vote	436,527	260,584
Percentage	61.30%	36.59%
- County results Hyde-Smith: 50–60% 60–70% 70–80% 80–90% Green: 40–50% 50–60% 60–70% 70–80% 80–90%
Commissioner of Agriculture and Commerce before election
Cindy Hyde-Smith
Republican
Elected Commissioner of Agriculture and Commerce
Cindy Hyde-Smith
Republican

Incumbent Republican Commissioner of Agriculture and Commerce Cindy Hyde-Smith ran for re-election to a second term in office against Addie Lee Green who ran as a Democrat. Hyde-Smith won in the general election against Green.

=== Democratic nomination ===
==== Candidate ====
- Addie Lee Green

=== Reform nomination ===
==== Candidate ====
- Cathy L. Toole

=== Republican primary ===
==== Candidate ====
- Cindy Hyde-Smith, incumbent

==== Results ====
Republican primary results
Party	Candidate	Votes	%
Republican	Cindy Hyde-Smith (incumbent)	214,643	100
Total votes		214,643	100

=== General election ===
==== Results ====
Mississippi Commissioner of Agriculture and Commerce, 2015
Party	Candidate	Votes	%
Republican	Cindy Hyde-Smith (incumbent)	436,527	61.30
Democratic	Addie L. Green	260,584	36.59
Reform	Cathy L. Toole	14,852	2.10
Total votes		712,085	100
Republican hold			

== Commissioner of Insurance ==
Mississippi Commissioner of Insurance election, 2015
- November 3, 2015
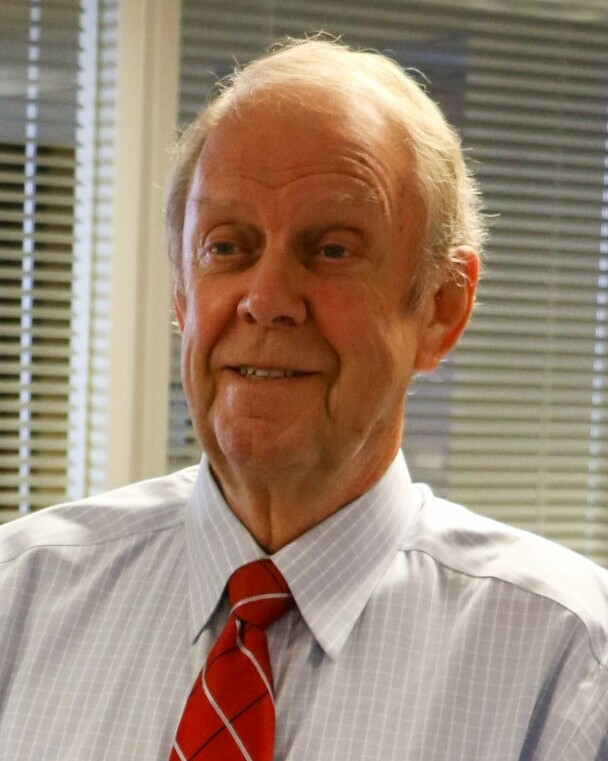
Nominee	Mike Chaney
Party	Republican
Electoral vote	122
Popular vote	591,566
Percentage	100%
- County results Chaney: 90–100%
Commissioner of Insurance before election
Mike Chaney
Republican
Elected Commissioner of Insurance
Mike Chaney
Republican

Incumbent Republican Commissioner of Insurance Mike Chaney ran for re-election to a third term in office. Businessman John Mosley ran against Chaney in the Republican primary.

Former State Representative and Director of the Mississippi Democratic Trust Brandon Jones was a possible Democratic candidate, though no Democrat filed to run for the office.

Chaney prevailed in the primary, guaranteeing his win in the general election.

=== Republican primary ===
==== Candidates ====
- Mike Chaney, incumbent
- John Mosley, businessman

==== Results ====
Republican primary results
Party	Candidate	Votes	%
Republican	Mike Chaney (incumbent)	196,361	72.61
Republican	John Mosley	74,066	27.39
Total votes		270,427	100

=== General election ===
==== Results ====
Mississippi Commissioner of Insurance election, 2015
Party	Candidate	Votes	%
Republican	Mike Chaney (incumbent)	591,566	100
Total votes		591,566	100
Republican hold			

== Public Service Commission ==
Mississippi Public Service Commissioner, Northern District election, 2015
- November 3, 2015
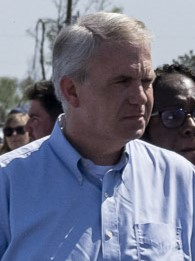

Nominee	Brandon Presley	Mike Maynard
Party	Democratic	Republican
Popular vote	146,518	94,793
Percentage	60.71%	39.28%
- County results Presley: 50–60% 60–70% 70–80% Maynard: 50–60% 70–80%
Northern District Commissioner before election
Brandon Presley
Democratic
Elected Northern District Commissioner
Brandon Presley
Democratic

=== Northern District ===
Incumbent Democratic Commissioner Brandon Presley had considered running for Governor and Lieutenant Governor, but decided not to and ran for re-election to a third term in office.

Presley won in the general election against Republican Mike Maynard.

==== Democratic nomination ====
===== Candidate =====
- Brandon Presley, incumbent

==== Republican nomination ====
===== Candidate =====
- Mike Maynard

Republican primary results
Party	Candidate	Votes	%
Republican	Mike Maynard	29,775	100
Total votes		29,775	100

==== General election ====
===== Results =====
Mississippi Public Service Commissioner, Northern District election, 2015
Party	Candidate	Votes	%
Democratic	Brandon Presley (incumbent)	146,518	60.71
Republican	Mike Maynard	94,793	39.28
Total votes		241,311	100
Democratic hold			

Mississippi Public Service Commissioner, Central District election, 2015
- November 3, 2015

Nominee	Cecil Brown	Brent Bailey
Party	Democratic	Republican
Popular vote	124,789	106,314
Percentage	53.36%	45.46%
- County results Brown: 50–60% 60–70% 70–80% 80–90% Bailey: 50–60% 60–70% 70–80%
Central District Commissioner before election
Lynn Posey
Republican
Elected Central District Commissioner
Cecil Brown
Democratic

=== Central District ===
Incumbent Republican Commissioner Lynn Posey retired rather than run for re-election to a third term in office.

For the Republicans, Brent Bailey and attorney and 2003 candidate for Governor Mitch Tyner ran in the primary. Other potential Republican candidates were former State Senator and candidate for State Treasurer in 2011 Lee Yancey and Jason Cochran, a utility construction company project manager, the son of former Commissioner Nielsen Cochran and nephew of U.S. Senator Thad Cochran

Bruce Burton and State Representative Cecil Brown ran for the Democrats. Robert Amos originally qualified as a Democratic candidate for this seat, but switched to run for the Central District of the Transportation Commission.

Brown faced off in the general election against Bailey and won.

==== Democratic primary ====
===== Candidates =====
- Cecil Brown
- Bruce Wilder Burton

===== Results =====
Democratic primary results
Party	Candidate	Votes	%
Democratic	Cecil Brown	70,385	73.56
Democratic	Bruce Wilder Burton	25,287	26.43
Total votes		95,672	100

==== Reform nomination ====
===== Candidate =====
- LaTrice D. Notree

==== Republican primary ====
===== Candidates =====
- Brent Bailey
- Tony Greer

===== Results =====
Republican primary results
Party	Candidate	Votes	%
Republican	Brent Bailey	48,674	63.07
Republican	Tony Greer	28,490	36.92
Total votes		77,164	100

==== General election ====
===== Results =====
Mississippi Public Service Commissioner, Central District election, 2015
Party	Candidate	Votes	%
Democratic	Cecil Brown	124,789	53.36
Republican	Brent Bailey	106,314	45.46
Reform	LaTrice D. Notree	2,742	1.17
Total votes		233,845	100
Democratic gain from Republican			

Mississippi Public Service Commissioner, Southern District election, 2015
- November 3, 2015
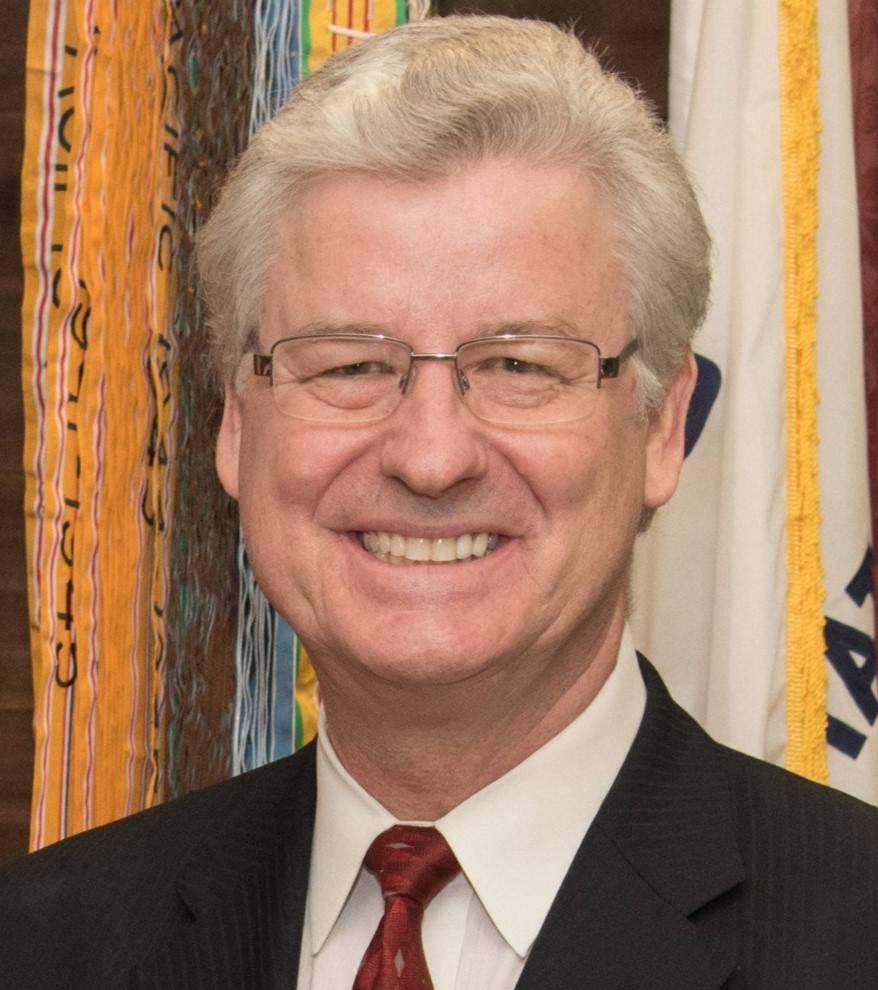

Nominee	Sam Britton	Tom Blanton
Party	Republican	Democratic
Popular vote	144,194	89,146
Percentage	60.53%	37.42%
- County results Britton: 40-50% 50-60% 60-70% 70-80% Blanton: 40-50% 50-60% 60-70%
Southern District Commissioner before election
Steve Renfroe
Republican
Elected Southern District Commissioner
Sam Britton
Republican

=== Southern District ===
Incumbent Republican Commissioner Steve Renfroe, who was appointed to the office in September 2013 after Leonard Bentz resigned to become executive director of the South Mississippi Planning and Development District, decided not to run for election to a full term in office. State Senator Philip Moran and Hancock County Supervisor Steve Seymour ruled out running and 2011 candidate Travis Rose chose not to run again. Sam Britton, Mike Collier, and State Senator Tony Smith both ran for the Republican nomination, in which Britton won following a runoff against Smith.

Thomas Blanton filed to run as the Democratic candidate and received the nomination unopposed.

Britton won in the general election against Blanton.

==== Democratic primary ====
===== Candidates =====
- Tom Blanton

==== Reform nomination ====
===== Candidate =====
- Lonny Kenneth Spence

==== Republican primary ====
===== Candidates =====
- Samuel F. "Sam" Britton, business investor
- Mike Collier
- Tony Smith, State Senator

===== Results =====
Republican primary results
Party	Candidate	Votes	%
Republican	Sam Britton	55,966	46.30
Republican	Tony Smith	34,445	28.49
Republican	Mike Collier	30,453	25.19
Total votes		120,864	100

===== Runoff =====
Republican primary runoff results
Party	Candidate	Votes	%
Republican	Sam Britton	43,116	58.67%
Republican	Tony Smith	30,364	41.32%
Total votes		73,480	100

==== General election ====
===== Results =====
Mississippi Public Service Commissioner, Southern District election, 2015
Party	Candidate	Votes	%
Republican	Sam Britton	144,194	60.53
Democratic	Tom Blanton	89,146	37.42
Reform	Lonny Spence	4,867	2.04
Total votes		238,207	100
Republican hold			

== Transportation Commission ==
Mississippi Transportation Commissioner, Northern District election, 2015
- November 3, 2015
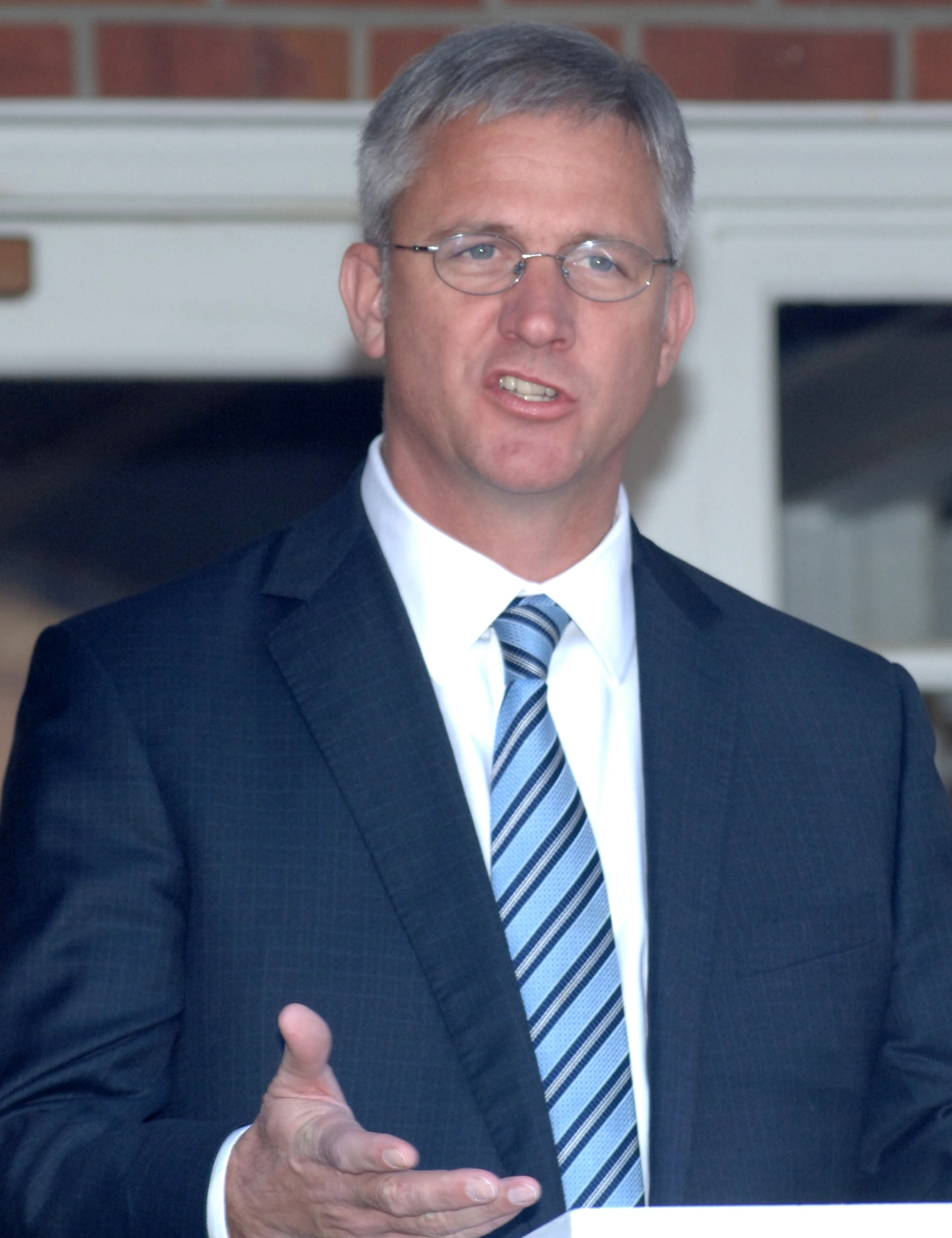

Nominee	Mike Tagert	Danny Woods
Party	Republican	Democratic
Popular vote	154,070	85,847
Percentage	64.22%	35.78%
- County results Tagert: 50-60% 60-70% 70-80% 80-90% Woods: 50-60% 60-70%
Northern District Commissioner before election
Mike Tagert
Republican
Elected Northern District Commissioner
Mike Tagert
Republican

=== Northern District ===
Incumbent Republican Mike Tagert, who won a special election in 2011 following the death of Democratic Commissioner Bill Minor, ran for re-election to a second full term in office. He also ran in the May 2015 special election for Mississippi's 1st congressional district. Hernando Mayor Chip Johnson announced that he would run for the Republican nomination, but he withdrew from the race following Tagert's loss in the Congressional election. Candidate Jimmy Mills of Tupelo challenged Tagert in the primary.

Democrat Danny Woods of Winona filed for the Democrats and faced Tagert in the general election; Tagert won.

==== Republican primary ====
===== Candidates =====
- Jimmie D. Mills
- Mike Tagert, incumbent

===== Results =====
Republican primary results
Party	Candidate	Votes	%
Republican	Mike Tagert	50,277	80.30
Republican	Jimmie Mills	12,329	19.69
Total votes		62,606	100

==== Democratic nomination ====
===== Candidate =====
- Danny Woods

==== General election ====
===== Results =====
Mississippi Transportation Commissioner, Northern District election, 2015
Party	Candidate	Votes	%
Republican	Mike Tagert (incumbent)	154,070	64.22
Democratic	Danny Woods	85,847	35.78
Total votes		239,197	100
Republican hold			

Mississippi Transportation Commissioner, Central District election, 2015
- November 3, 2015
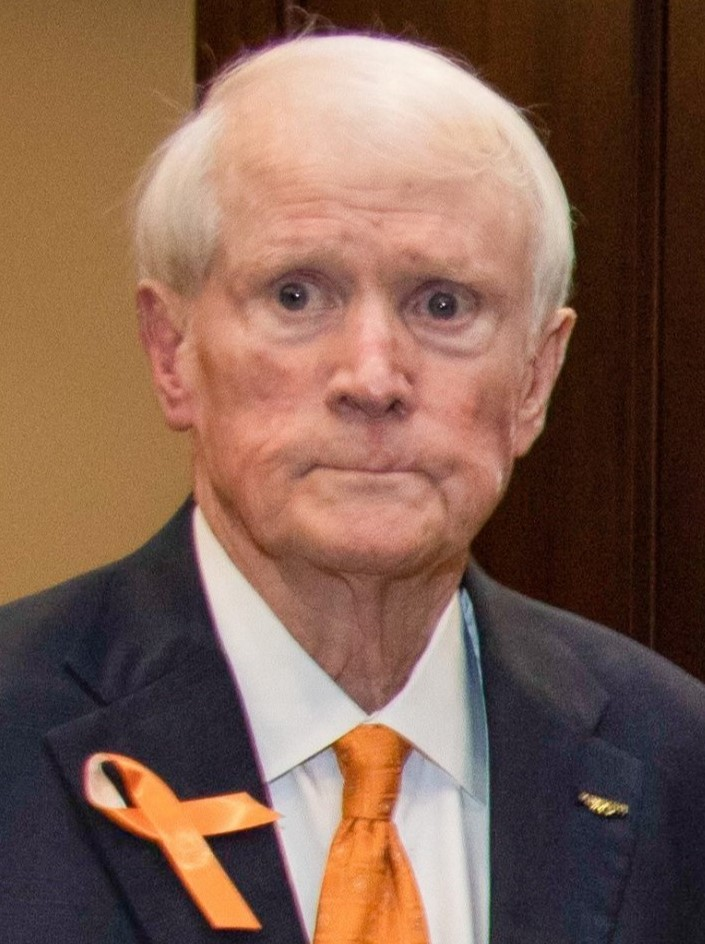

Nominee	Dick Hall	Mary H. Coleman
Party	Republican	Democratic
Popular vote	128,523	106,828
Percentage	54.61%	45.39%
- County results Hall: 50-60% 60-70% 70-80% 80-90% Coleman: 50-60% 60-70% 70-80% 80-90%
Central District Commissioner before election
Dick Hall
Republican
Elected Central District Commissioner
Dick Hall
Republican

=== Central District ===
Incumbent Republican Commissioner Dick Hall, who was appointed to the Commission in 1999, ran for re-election to a fifth full term in office.

Robert Amos ran for the Democrats, as well as Mary Coleman and Natasha Magee-Woods. Former Jackson Mayor Harvey Johnson, Jr. was a potential Democratic candidate, but he did not run.

Hall won in the general election against Coleman.

==== Democratic primary ====
===== Candidates =====
- Robert Amos
- Mary Coleman, State Representative
- Natasha Magee-Woods

===== Results =====
Democratic primary results
Party	Candidate	Votes	%
Democratic	Mary H. Coleman	46,293	48.10
Democratic	Robert Amos	31,676	32.91
Democratic	Natasha K. Magee-Woods	18,281	18.99
Total votes		96,250	100

===== Runoff =====
Democratic primary runoff results
Party	Candidate	Votes	%
Democratic	Mary H. Coleman	38,191	68.04
Democratic	Robert Amos	17,937	31.95
Total votes		56,128	100

==== Republican nomination ====
===== Candidate =====
- Dick Hall, incumbent

===== Results =====
Republican primary results
Party	Candidate	Votes	%
Republican	Dick Hall	69,805	100
Total votes		69,805	100

==== General election ====
===== Results =====
Mississippi Transportation Commissioner, Central District election, 2015
Party	Candidate	Votes	%
Republican	Dick Hall (incumbent)	128,523	54.61
Democratic	Mary H. Coleman	106,828	45.39
Total votes		235,351	100
Republican hold			

Mississippi Transportation Commissioner, Southern District election, 2015
- November 3, 2015
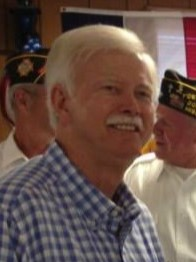

Nominee	Tom King	Chad Toney
Party	Republican	Democratic
Popular vote	157,601	73,067
Percentage	66.54%	30.85%
- County results King: 40-50% 50-60% 60-70% 70-80% 80-90% Toney: 40-50% 50-60% 60-70%
Southern District Commissioner before election
Tom King
Republican
Elected Southern District Commissioner
Tom King
Republican

=== Southern District ===
Incumbent Republican Commissioner Tom King ran for re-election to a second term in office. Chad Toney ran for the Democrats.

King won in the general election against Toney.

==== Democratic nomination ====
===== Candidate =====
- Chad Toney

==== Reform nomination ====
===== Candidate =====
- Sheranda Atkinson

==== Republican nomination ====
===== Candidate =====
- Tom King, incumbent

===== Results =====
Republican primary results
Party	Candidate	Votes	%
Republican	Tom King	117,400	100
Total votes		117,400	100

==== General election ====
===== Results =====
Mississippi Transportation Commissioner, Southern District election, 2015
Party	Candidate	Votes	%
Republican	Tom King	157,601	66.54
Democratic	Chad Toney	73,067	30.85
Reform	Sheranda Atkinson	6,175	2.61
Total votes		236,843	100
Republican hold			

== Special Congressional election ==
A special election for Mississippi's 1st congressional district was held to fill the term left by the vacancy created by the death of Alan Nunnelee. Nunnelee, a member of the Republican Party, died on February 6, 2015. The top-two primary was held on May 12, with Democrat Walter Zinn and Republican Trent Kelly advancing. Kelly defeated Zinn in the June 12 runoff election.
