= Brandon Presley =

American politician (born 1977)

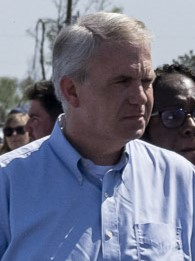
- Presley in 2023

Member of the Mississippi Public Service Commission from the Northern district
- In office January 1, 2008 – January 4, 2024
- Preceded by: Dorlos Robinson
- Succeeded by: Chris Brown

Mayor of Nettleton
- In office 2001–2007
- Preceded by: Tommy Riley
- Succeeded by: R. V. Adams

Personal details
- Born: Brandon Everitt Presley; July 21, 1977 (age 49) Amory, Mississippi, U.S.
- Party: Democratic
- Spouse: Katelyn Mabus (m. 2023)
- Relatives: Harold Ray Presley (uncle); Elvis Presley (second cousin); Ray Mabus (cousin-in-law)
- Education: Itawamba Community College; Mississippi State University (BA)
- Website: Campaign website

Brandon Everitt Presley (born July 21, 1977) is an American politician who served as a member of the Mississippi Public Service Commission from the northern district from 2008 to 2024 and mayor of Nettleton, Mississippi, from 2001 to 2007. He is a member of the Democratic Party.

Presley has been described as a moderate, populist politician who holds conservative stances on issues such as gun control and abortion. He was the Democratic nominee for governor of Mississippi in 2023, narrowly losing to incumbent Republican Tate Reeves by 3.24 percentage points. He had the best performance for a Democratic candidate for governor since 1999.

== Early life ==
Brandon Presley was born on July 21, 1977, in Amory, Mississippi, and raised in Nettleton. His father was an alcoholic and died when Brandon was eight years old, leaving him in the sole care of his mother. His uncle, Harold Ray Presley, subsequently served as a father figure for him. He studied at Itawamba Community College and Mississippi State University.

== Political career ==
=== Early activities ===
Presley described his politics as "Populist, FDR-Billy McCoy Democrat." He managed the successful campaign of his uncle Harold for the office of Sheriff of Lee County when he was 16 years old.

Presley ran for the office of mayor of Nettleton in 2001 and won with 78 percent of the vote. He was sworn-in as the mayor in July 2001. Aged 23 upon his assumption of the office, he was the youngest mayor in Mississippi's history. He served until 2007. As mayor, he crossed party lines to endorse the reelection campaign of George W. Bush in 2004.

=== Public Service Commissioner ===
On June 15, 2007, Presley declared his campaign for the office of Public Service Commissioner for the Northern District of the Mississippi Public Service Commission. He defeated two other candidates in the August Democratic primary and defeated Republican Mabel Murphree in the general election. He was re-elected in 2011, 2015, and 2019.

Presley assumed office as Public Service Commissioner for the Northern District on January 1, 2008. During his first year in office he advocated streaming the commission's meetings on the internet. He has advocated bringing internet access to rural areas of Mississippi.

Presley opposed the Kemper Project, a large Mississippi Power "clean coal" electricity plant development in Kemper County, as residents in the Northern District were not served by Mississippi Power or would otherwise economically benefit from the project. The project suffered from delays and cost overruns. In 2017, Presley became chairman of the Public Service Commission, which then forced Mississippi Power to terminate its plans for clean coal electricity generation at the Kemper facility.

Presley, as well as the other two members of the Public Service Commission, opposes using Mississippi as an alternative site to Yucca Mountain for nuclear waste storage.

In 2014, Presley succeeded Betsy Wergin of Minnesota to serve as chair of the National Association of Regulatory Utility Commissioners' Committee on Consumer Affairs. The committee is charged with analyzing the role that state service commissions play in consumer protection within the energy and telecommunications industries.

In the 2015 elections, Democratic state representative Cecil Brown was elected to represent the Central District. This gave the Democratic Party a majority on the Commission. Subsequently Presley was appointed to serve as chair of the commission. In March, he presided over the groundbreaking of the largest solar power facility in the state. The project is a joint effort between the PSC, the United States Navy and Mississippi Power at NCBC Gulfport. He was replaced by Chris Brown on January 4, 2024.

=== 2023 gubernatorial campaign ===
Following months of speculation, Presley announced his candidacy for governor of Mississippi in the 2023 election on January 12, 2023. The same day, U.S. Rep. Bennie Thompson of Mississippi endorsed Presley. Later that month, from a shuttered hospital in Newton, he delivered a response to incumbent governor Tate Reeves' State of the State address, advocating for the state to embrace Medicaid expansion and accusing Reeves of allowing rural hospitals to close. On February 16, the Mississippi Democratic Party's executive committee voted to disqualify two minor candidates for the party's gubernatorial nomination for failing to follow ethics disclosures, leaving Presley the only qualified candidate in the Democratic primary. On August 8, as the only Democratic candidate for governor on the ballot, Presley won the Democratic primary.

Although Mississippi is considered a Republican stronghold, many analysts stated that Reeves was a vulnerable incumbent. The Cook Political Report changed the race from Likely Republican to Lean Republican in October after polls showed Presley within the margin of error in multiple polls. In the general election, Reeves defeated Presley, albeit by a narrower margin than initially expected.

== Personal life ==
Presley is a second cousin of Elvis Presley. He lost 216 pounds (98 kg) during 2013 and 2014. Presley married Katelyn Mabus, who is a cousin of former Mississippi governor Ray Mabus, in August 2023.

== Works cited ==
- McGarity, Thomas O. (2019). Pollution, Politics, and Power: The Struggle for Sustainable Electricity. Harvard University Press. ISBN 9780674242807.

Political offices
Preceded by Dorlos Robinson	Member of the Mississippi Public Service Commission from the Northern district 2008–2024	Succeeded by Chris Brown
Party political offices
Preceded by Jim Hood	Democratic nominee for Governor of Mississippi; 2023	Most recent
