= Mary Coleman =

Mary Coleman may refer to:

- Mary Coleman (Mississippi politician) (born 1946), member of the Mississippi House of Representatives
- Mary Sue Coleman (born 1943), 13th and former president of the University of Michigan
- Mary S. Coleman (1914–2001), justice of the Michigan Supreme Court
- Mary Elizabeth Coleman, American politician, attorney, and pro-life activist in Missouri
