= Stacey Pickering =

American politician

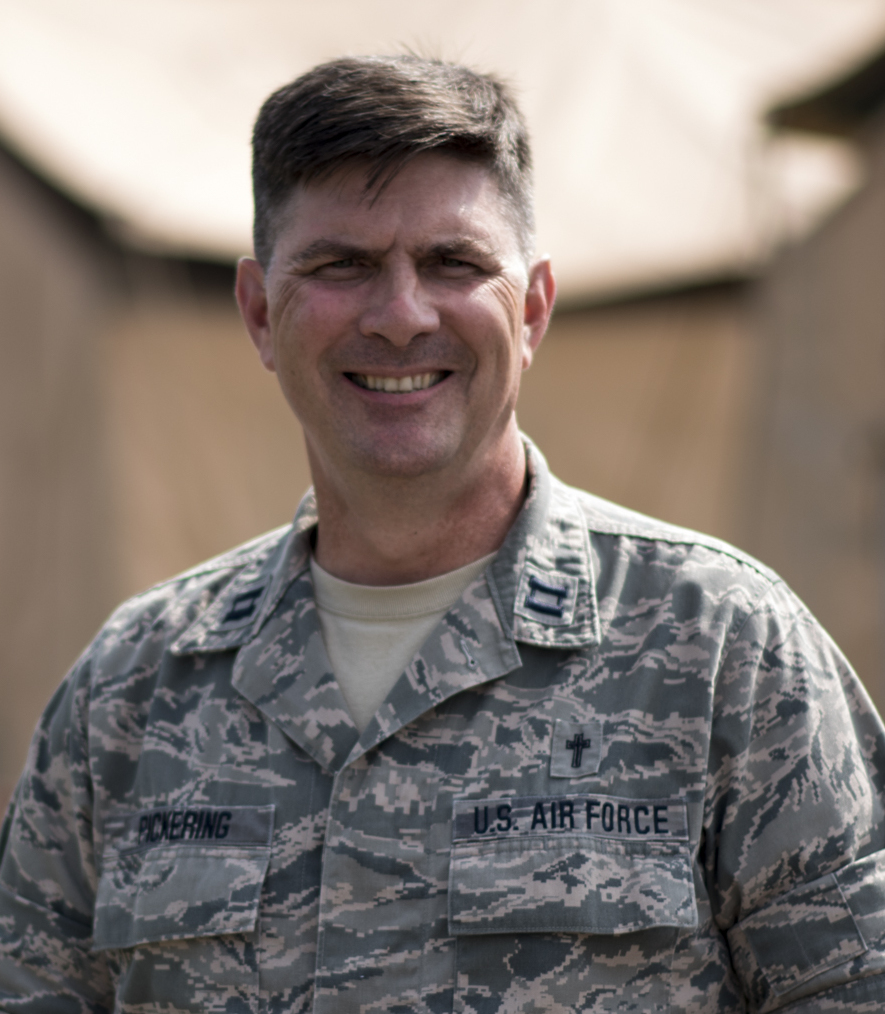
- Pickering in 2017

41st Auditor of Mississippi
- In office January 10, 2008 – July 12, 2018
- Governor: Haley Barbour; Phil Bryant
- Preceded by: Phil Bryant
- Succeeded by: Shad White

Member of the Mississippi State Senate from the 42nd district
- In office January 6, 2004 – January 8, 2008
- Preceded by: Vincent Scoper
- Succeeded by: Chris McDaniel

Personal details
- Born: Stacey Eugene Pickering; July 12, 1968 (age 58) Laurel, Mississippi, U.S.
- Party: Republican
- Spouse: Whitney Pickering
- Children: 4
- Relatives: Charles W. Pickering (uncle); Chip Pickering (cousin)
- Education: Jones County Junior College; Samford University (BS); New Orleans Baptist; Theological Seminary (MS)

Stacey Eugene Pickering (born July 12, 1968) is from Laurel, Mississippi, United States. He has served as a Mississippi State Senator, as State Auditor of Mississippi, as executive director of the Mississippi Veterans Affairs Board, and in the Mississippi Air National Guard.

== Mississippi Air National Guard ==
Pickering has served in the 186th Air Operations Group in the Mississippi Air National Guard.

== Mississippi State Senate ==
For four years Pickering represented District 42, based in Jones County, in the Mississippi State Senate, to which he was elected in 2003, after incumbent state senator Vincent Scoper decided to retire.

== Mississippi State Auditor ==
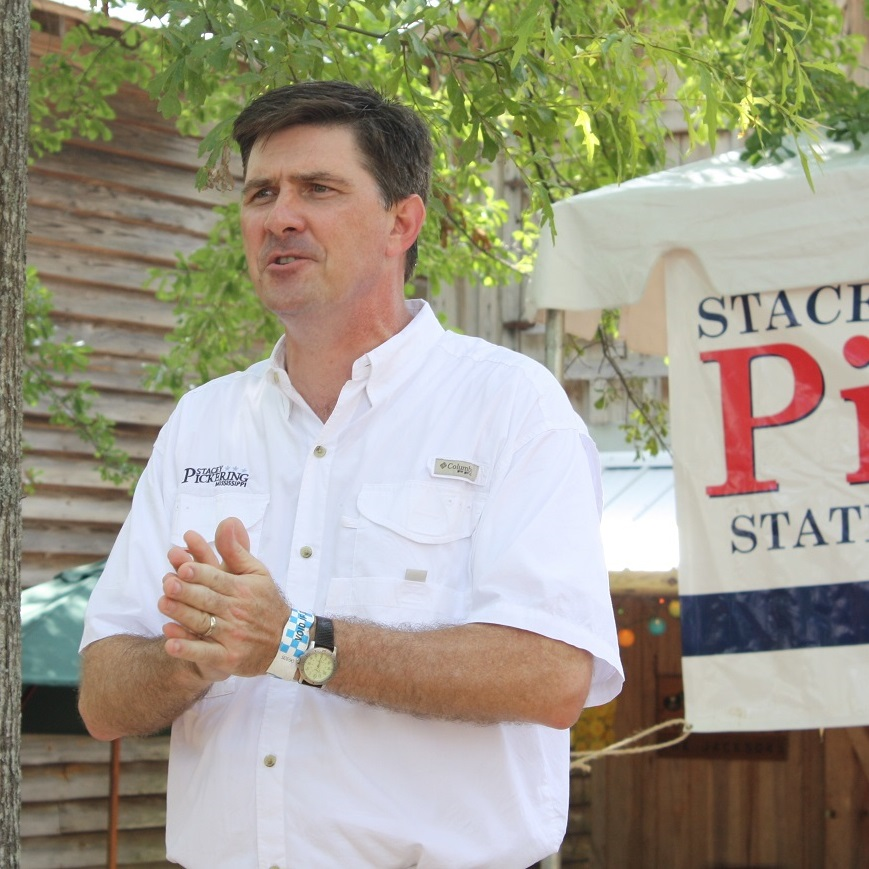
Pickering speaking at the Neshoba County Fair in 2013

Pickering was elected State Auditor of Mississippi in 2007, when he defeated Democrat Mike Sumrall, 55 to 45 percent, in the general election; he served in the position for over a decade. He was sworn in on January 10, 2008, and succeeded Phil Bryant. In 2011, Pickering received only third-party opposition as he defeated Reform Party nominee Ashley Norwood, 76 to 24 percent.

In 2016, Pickering began an audit that found that only $3 million had been spent by GreenTech Automotive on automotive assembly equipment and parts in Mississippi, whereas it had promised to invest $60 million and create 350 jobs in Tunica County. While the company had promised to create 350 full-time jobs, he found that it never created more than 94 full-time jobs in Mississippi at any time. In July 2017, Pickering demanded that GreenTech and its CEO Charlie Wang pay Mississippi $6 million, because Greentech had not lived up to its promises. He said: "I would venture that there isn’t really much of an operation in Tunica at all. This appears to have been a game of smoke and mirrors, and a corporate entity that never had any intention to deliver on the promises it made." GreenTech declared Chapter 11 bankruptcy in February 2018.

Pickering resigned in 2018 to lead the Mississippi Veteran Affairs Board.

== Mississippi Veterans Affairs Board ==
Pickering served as executive director of the Mississippi Veterans Affairs Board (MSVA) from 2018, when he replaced Randy Reeves, to 2022. In May 2022, MSVA issued a press release stating that Pickering and his chief of staff were both resigning. Following the press release, WLBT News reported that Pickering resigned because he had an unprofessional relationship with his chief of staff. WLBT also alleged abuse of state time and alluded to a possible criminal probe. Subsequent analysis raised what a journalist called "significant questions about how the agency operated under Pickering, a former state auditor and legislator, and the workplace culture he cultivated."

== Awards ==
In 2009, the United States Department of Defense honored him with a "Patriot Award" from its Mississippi Employer Support of the Guard and Reserve (ESGR) in recognition of his extraordinary support of its employees who serve in the Mississippi National Guard and Reserve. Pickering received this same award again in May 2013. He has been awarded the Korea Defense Service Medal.

In June 2012, Pickering was honored with the National State Auditor's Association's "National Excellence in Accountability Award" for his work on accountability and oversight regarding the American Recovery and Reinvestment Act of 2009. In 2014, Pickering received the David M. Walker Excellence in Government Performance and Accountability Award, a national award presented once every two years to three auditors from the public sector accountability community who represent federal, state, and local governments.

== Personal ==
Pickering is a nephew of former U.S. judge Charles W. Pickering, and a cousin of former U.S. Congressman Chip Pickering.

== Elections ==
Mississippi State Senate 42nd District election, 2003
Party	Candidate	Votes	%
Republican	Stacey Pickering	10,932	58.77
Democratic	Randy Ellzey	7,669	41.23

Mississippi Auditor election, 2007
Party	Candidate	Votes	%
Republican	Stacey Pickering	399,279	54.97
Democratic	Mike Sumrall	327,033	45.03

Mississippi Auditor election, 2011
Party	Candidate	Votes	%
Republican	Stacey Pickering (inc.)	596,395	75.62
Reform	Ashley Norwood	192,271	24.38

Mississippi Auditor Republican primary election, 2015
Party	Candidate	Votes	%
Republican	Stacey Pickering (inc.)	183,367	67.74
Republican	Mary Hawkins-Butler	87,318	32.26

Mississippi Auditor election, 2015
Party	Candidate	Votes	%
Republican	Stacey Pickering (inc.)	453,601	63.99
Democratic	Jocelyn "Joce" Pepper Pritchett	245,899	34.69
Reform	Lajena Walley	9,380	1.32

Party political offices
Preceded by Phil Bryant	Republican nominee for State Auditor of Mississippi; 2007, 2011, 2015	Succeeded by Shad White
Mississippi State Senate
Preceded by Vincent Scoper	Member of the Mississippi State Senate from the 42nd district 2004–2008	Succeeded by Chris McDaniel
Political offices
Preceded by Phil Bryant	Auditor of Mississippi; 2008–2018	Succeeded by Shad White
