= Rodney Hall (Mississippi politician) =

American politician

Member of the Mississippi House of Representatives from the 20th district
- Incumbent
- Assumed office January 2, 2024
- Preceded by: Chris Brown

Personal details
- Born: Rodney Hall; December 7, 1987 (age 38)
- Party: Republican
- Education: University of Mississippi School of Law; Marion Military Institute
- Occupation: Attorney, army infantry officer
- Website: House website

Military service
- Branch/service: United States Army
- Years of service: 2004–present (reserve)
- Rank: Lieutenant Colonel
- Unit: Army National Guard
- Commands: 155th Infantry Regiment (United States)
- Battles/wars: Operation Enduring Freedom; Operation Inherent Resolve; Operation Spartan Shield

Rodney Hall (born December 7, 1987) is an American politician serving as a member of the Mississippi House of Representatives for the 20th District. A member of the Republican Party, he previously served on Capitol Hill as a congressional staffer for Mississippi’s 1st Congressional Distrtct. Hall assumed office in January 2024 and is notably the first African-American Republican to serve in the Mississippi House since the Reconstruction era.

== Early life and education ==
Rodney Hall was born on December 7, 1987. He attended the Marion Military Institute, where he developed an interest in public service and leadership. Hall later earned a Juris Doctor degree from the University of Mississippi School of Law.

== Military career ==
Hall has served in the Army National Guard since 2004. During his military career, he has been deployed in various operations, including Operation Enduring Freedom, Operation Inherent Resolve, and Operation Spartan Shield. He currently holds the rank of Lieutenant Colonel and commanded Bravo Company in the 155th Infantry Regiment (United States).

== Political career ==
Hall was elected to the Mississippi House of Representatives in 2023 and took office in January 2024. He represents the 20th District and is a member of the Republican Party. His election marked a significant milestone as he became the first African-American Republican to serve in the Mississippi House since the Reconstruction era.

== Personal life ==
Rodney Hall is married to Tierra Marie Hall, and they have four children. The family resides in DeSoto County, Mississippi.
