= David McRae =

American politician

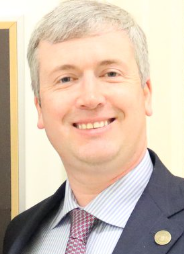

55th Treasurer of Mississippi
- Incumbent
- Assumed office January 9, 2020
- Governor: Tate Reeves
- Preceded by: Lynn Fitch

Personal details
- Born: 1981 (age 44–45) Ridgeland, Mississippi, U.S.
- Party: Republican
- Education: Southern Methodist University (BA); Mississippi College (JD)

David McRae is an American politician. A member of the Republican Party, McRae has been Mississippi State Treasurer since 2020, having been elected in the 2019 election. Prior to entering politics, he worked for his family's business as a managing partner.

== Early life and education ==
McRae is from Ridgeland, Mississippi. He graduated from Jackson Preparatory School in 2000. He graduated from Southern Methodist University and moved to California to work in film production. He later returned to Mississippi to study at the Mississippi College School of Law, where he earned his Juris Doctor. While in law school, he worked for Justice Jess Dickinson at the Mississippi Supreme Court.

== Career ==
McRae's family owned the McRae's department stores. McRae is a managing partner of McRae Investments for his family's business. He is also a licensed attorney.

=== Politics ===
A Republican, McRae ran for Mississippi State Treasurer in the 2015 election in the Republican primary against Lynn Fitch. The primary was considered one of the most contested races of the cycle due to McRae's ability to self-fund his campaign and his hiring of veteran campaign consultants. He was endorsed by Clark Reed, former chairman of the Mississippi GOP. He lost 57% to 42%.

McRae ran again for the office, announcing his candidacy in 2018. He spent heavily in the primary against state senator Eugene Clarke, loaning himself $1.7 million. He was endorsed by the outgoing Republican governor Phil Bryant. He defeated Clarke in the primary and won the general election in November with 61% of the vote against Democrat Addie Lee Green.

McRae was sworn in as State Treasurer on January 9, 2020. He was sworn in to a second term on January 4, 2024.

== Personal life ==
McRae lives in Ridgeland, Mississippi. He is married and has three children.

Party political offices
Preceded by Lynn Fitch	Republican nominee for Mississippi State Treasurer; 2019, 2023	Most recent
Political offices
Preceded by Lynn Fitch	Treasurer of Mississippi; 2020–present	Incumbent
