= Sam Britton =

American politician (1956–2023)

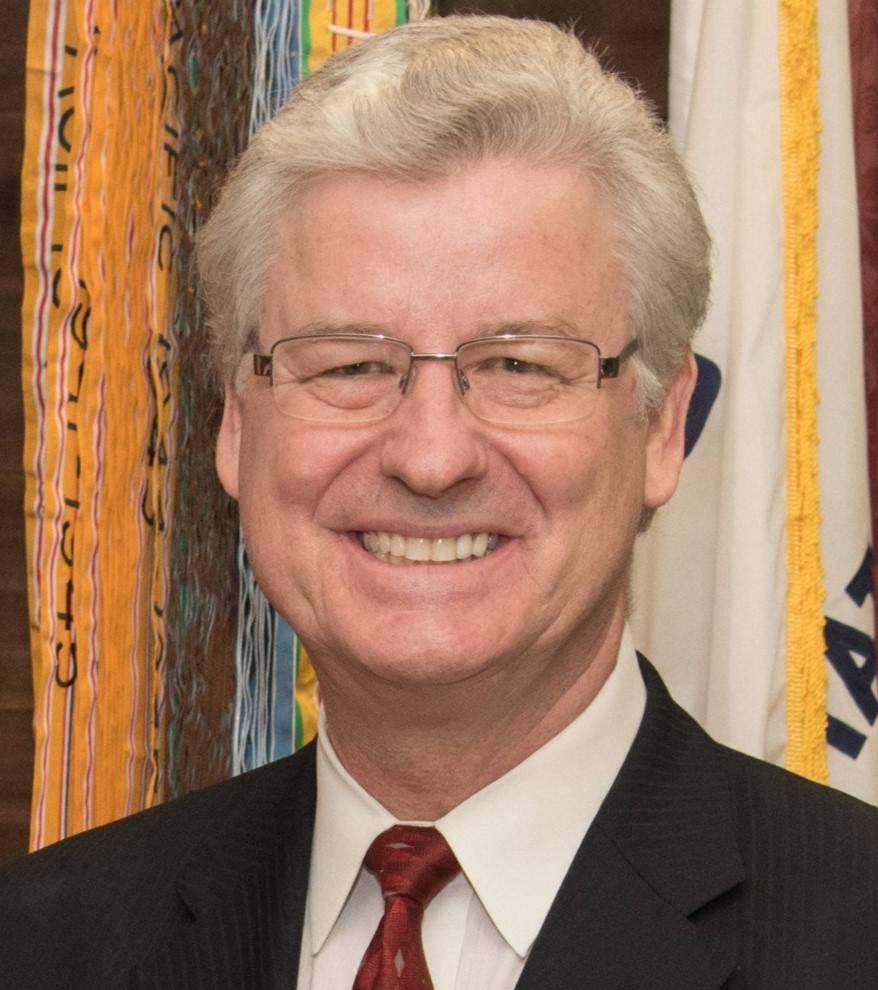

Commissioner for the Southern District of the Mississippi Public Service Commission
- In office January 2016 – January 2020
- Preceded by: Steve Renfroe
- Succeeded by: Dane Maxwell

Personal details
- Born: July 30, 1956 Waynesboro, Mississippi
- Died: October 16, 2023 Laurel, Mississippi
- Party: Republican
- Spouse: Robin Robinson
- Education: Jones County Junior College (AS); University of Southern Mississippi (BA)

Sam Britton (July 30, 1956 – October 16, 2023) was a Republican member of the Mississippi Public Service Commission representing the Southern District, serving one term from January 2016 to January 2020.

Born in Waynesboro, Mississippi, Britton worked in his family's pipeline construction business before earning an accounting degree from the University of Southern Mississippi. He served in key roles at the State Auditor and State Tax Commission offices, later establishing his own accounting firm and succeeding in investment banking. A Republican, Britton was elected to the Mississippi Public Service Commission in 2015 but faced defeat in the 2019 Secretary of State election.

Britton was married to Robin Robinson, a former state representative and sitting state senator, who was actively involved in the Methodist church, and competed in numerous marathons. He died on October 16, 2023 at the age of 67 from cancer.

== Early life and education ==
Sam Britton was born on July 30, 1956 and grew up in Waynesboro, Mississippi. His mother, Sytilee Britton, worked in the school lunch room and drove a school bus. His father, Ellis Britton, Sr., worked in the oil industry as a roughneck.

Britton graduated from Jones County Junior College before attending the University of Southern Mississippi where he completed a business degree. After completing college, he worked at his uncle's pipeline construction business. In the early 1980s, Birton returned to the University of Southern Mississippi and got a degree in accounting. He then completed the requirements to become a CPA.

== Career ==
After college, Britton worked in the State Auditor and State Tax Commission offices before starting his accounting firm. He then shifted to investment banking. He was recognized in 2014 as a "Mississippi Leader in Finance" by the Mississippi Business Journal.

Britton was elected to the Mississippi Public Service Commission for the Southern District as a Republican in November 2015 with over 60% of the vote defeating Democratic candidate Tom Blanton and Reform candidate Lonny Spence. He ran for Secretary of State of Mississippi in the 2019 Mississippi elections, but lost to Michael Watson.

== Personal life ==
Britton died on October 16, 2023 from cancer at the age of 67.

Jones met his wife, Robin Robinson, in the fall of 1974 at college. His wife is the former state representative for the 88th district and is now the state senator for the 42nd district, assuming office in 2024. They had one daughter together. He was Methodist and served in leadership positions in his local church. He lived in Laurel, Mississippi.

Britton completed several marathons including the Marine Corps Marathon in Washington, D.C., The New York City Marathon and the San Francisco Marathon.

== Electoral history ==
2015 Mississippi Public Service Commissioner, Southern District, Republican primary
Party	Candidate	Votes	%
Republican	Sam Britton	55,966	46.30
Republican	Tony Smith	34,445	28.49
Republican	Mike Collier	30,453	25.19
Total votes		120,864	100

2015 Mississippi Public Service Commissioner, Southern District, Republican primary runoff
Party	Candidate	Votes	%
Republican	Sam Britton	43,116	58.67%
Republican	Tony Smith	30,364	41.32%
Total votes		73,480	100

2015 Mississippi Public Service Commissioner, Southern District, election
Party	Candidate	Votes	%
Republican	Sam Britton	144,194	60.53
Democratic	Tom Blanton	89,146	37.42
Reform	Lonny Spence	4,867	2.04
Total votes		238,207	100
Republican hold			

2019 Mississippi Secretary of State Republican primary
Party	Candidate	Votes	%
Republican	Michael Watson	187,054	52.8
Republican	Sam Britton	167,440	47.2
Total votes		354,494	100.0

Political offices
Preceded by Steve Renfroe	Commissioner of the Mississippi Public Service Commission from the Southern district 2016–2020	Succeeded by Dane Maxwell
