= Vincent Scoper =

American politician

Member of the Mississippi Senate from the 42nd district
- In office January 12, 1988 – January 6, 2004
- Succeeded by: Stacey Pickering
- In office January 8, 1980 – January 10, 1984

Member of the Mississippi House of Representatives
- In office January 11, 1972 – January 8, 1980

Personal details
- Born: May 15, 1933 Christian, Mississippi
- Died: September 14, 2014 (aged 81) Laurel, Mississippi
- Party: Republican

Vincent Scoper (May 15, 1933 – September 14, 2014) was an American politician who served in the Mississippi House of Representatives from 1972 to 1980 and in the Mississippi Senate from the 42nd district from 1980 to 1984 and from 1988 to 2004.

He died of esophageal cancer on September 14, 2014, in Laurel, Mississippi at age 81.
