= Chris Brown (Mississippi politician) =

American politician

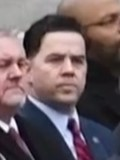

Member of the Mississippi Public Service Commission from the Northern district
- Incumbent
- Assumed office January 4, 2024
- Governor: Tate Reeves
- Preceded by: Brandon Presley

Member of the Mississippi House of Representatives from the 20th district
- In office January 2012 – January 2, 2024
- Preceded by: Jimmy Puckett
- Succeeded by: Rodney Hall

Personal details
- Born: March 5, 1971 (age 55) Walnut, Mississippi, U.S.
- Party: Republican
- Education: Northeast Mississippi Community College (AA); University of Memphis (BA)

Christopher R. Brown (born March 5, 1971) is an American businessman, serving as a member of the Mississippi Public Service Commission for the Northern District since 2024. A Republican, he is a former member of the Mississippi House of Representatives for the 20th district from 2012 to 2024. His district represented Monroe, Itawamba, and Lee counties.

In the State House, he was a founder of the Mississippi Freedom Caucus and advocated for conservative causes. Brown served as President of the House Legislative Conservative Coalition 2015-2018. He voted against the final version of medical marijuana, called for investigations into electoral fraud, and filed resolutions against critical race theory. As commissioner, he has advocated for maintaining low energy rates and critiqued the Biden administration energy policy. Brown was the first Republican to be elected to serve as the Representative for House District 20 and now serves at the first Republican to be elected to the Northern Districts Public Service Commission.

== Early life and education ==
Brown was born on March 5, 1971 in Mississippi. He was raised in DeSoto County and graduated from Walnut High School. He graduated from Northeast MIssissippi Community College and the University of Memphis. He is a businessman.

He has five children and resides in Monroe County. He is Baptist.

== Political career ==
=== Mississippi House of Representatives ===
He ran for the Mississippi House of Representatives against Jimmy Puckett in 2007 but lost by 100 votes. He ran again in 2011 and was endorsed by the Mississippi Tea Party. Brown won the election 56% to 44%. He was placed on the Agriculture, Conservation and Water Resources, Medicaid, Transportation, and Ways and Means committees. He drafted legislation to override federal gun control rules by making Mississippi-made firearms subject to state, rather than federal law. He ran in the special election to Mississippi's 1st Congressional District in 2015 but withdrew early in the race.

He won reelection in 2015 by a vote of 64% to 36%. In 2016, he was placed as the Chair of the Medicaid committee, and served on the Appropriations, Banking and Financial Services, Conservation and Water Resources, Constitution, and Public Health and Human Services committees. In 2016, Brown was recognized by the American Conservative Union Foundation, receiving the Award for Conservative Excellence. When chairing the Medicaid committee, he led the passing of a bill that would target medicaid fraud.

In 2019, he ran for election unopposed. He was appointed as chair to the Conservation and Water Resources committee, and was a member of Banking and Financial Services, Judiciary A, Judiciary En Banc, Medicaid, Ways and Means, and Wildlife, Fisheries and Parks committees. In 2020, he released a video alongside several other state representatives defending citizens right to vote for the flag of their choice; . He was a founding member of the House Freedom Caucus and advocated for an end to COVID regulations. He signed a letter calling for an investigation into election fraud in the 2020 presidential election. He filed resolutions against critical race theory and DEI.

=== Public service Commission ===
Brown has announced that he is running for the position of Mississippi Public Service Commissioner for the Northern District upon the retirement of Brandon Presley to run for governor. He ran against Tanner Newman after Mandy Gunasekara was disqualified for residency issues. Brown maintained a large cash advantage throughout the race, largely self-funding his campaign. Discussing his policy positions for the post, Brown advocated for protecting consumers against increases in taxes or high rates. He defended the use of coal and said he supports an "all the above" approach to solar and other renewables depending on the cost and impact on the people of Mississippi. He critiqued the Biden administration's energy policy.

He won the primary election 61% to 39%, effectively flipping the seat to the Republicans from the Democrats for the first time in history. He was sworn in on January 4, 2024. Brown stated his initial priorities were tackling the Holly Springs Utility District in conjunction with the Tennessee Valley Authority. He also wanted to focus on keeping energy rates low and maintaining reliable energy output. He advocated against changing the commission's composition to appointed officials.

He endorsed Trump's 2024 presidential campaign.
