= Shad White =

42nd Auditor of Mississippi

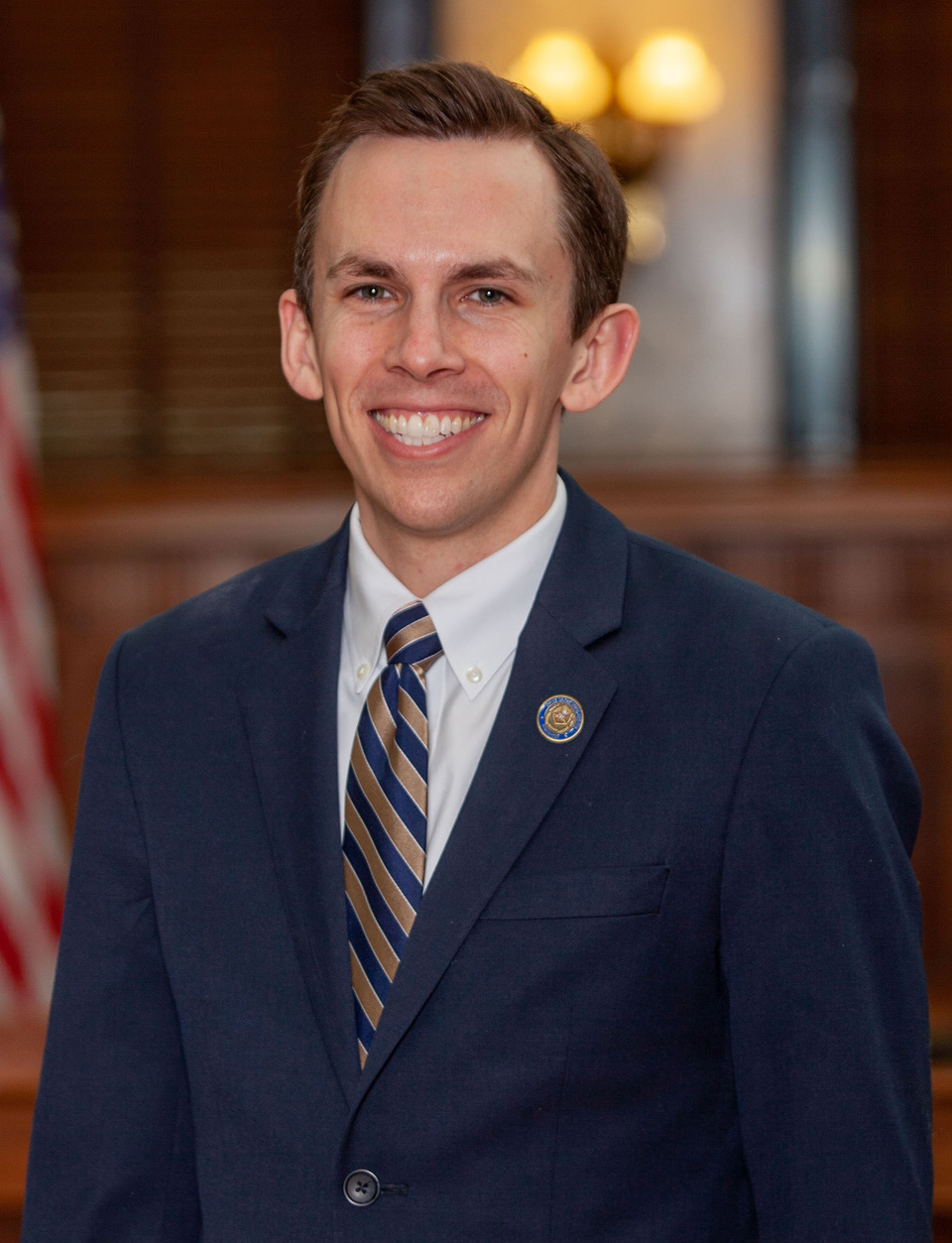
- White in 2020

42nd Auditor of Mississippi
- Incumbent
- Assumed office July 17, 2018
- Governor: Phil Bryant; Tate Reeves
- Preceded by: Stacey Pickering

Personal details
- Born: Shadrack Tucker White; September 22, 1985 (age 41) Sandersville, Mississippi, U.S.
- Party: Republican
- Spouse: Rina Thomas (m. 2017)
- Children: 3
- Education: University of Mississippi (BA); St John's College, Oxford (MS); Harvard University (JD)
- Website: Auditor website Campaign website

Military service
- Allegiance: United States
- Branch/service: United States Army; United States Air Force
- Years of service: 2020–2025 (Air Force); 2025–present (Army)
- Rank: Captain
- Unit: Mississippi Air National Guard; Mississippi Army National Guard
- Battles/wars: Operation Epic Fury

Shadrack Tucker White (born September 22, 1985) is an American politician and attorney serving as the 42nd State Auditor of Mississippi since 2018. A member of the Republican Party, White is the first millennial to hold statewide office in the Deep South. He was appointed to the position by Governor Phil Bryant in July 2018 and was subsequently elected without opposition in 2019. White won reelection in 2023 with 59% of the vote.

Born and raised in Sandersville, Mississippi, White attended the University of Mississippi, where he earned degrees in economics and political science. He was named a Rhodes Scholar in 2008 and went on to study economic and social history at St. John's College, Oxford, earning a Master of Science degree. White later earned a Juris Doctor degree from Harvard Law School in 2014.

He previously served as Director of the Mississippi Justice Institute. He is a Certified Fraud Examiner. In 2026, White served in the Middle East during Operation Epic Fury with a special operations detachment.

On November 9, 2026, White announced his candidacy in the 2027 Mississippi gubernatorial election.

== Early life and education ==
White was born on September 22, 1985, in Sandersville, Mississippi. White's father, Charles Robert White, and grandfather, Charles Raymond White, were oilfield pumpers. His mother, Emily Morgan White, was a public school art teacher. White grew up in Sandersville and attended Sandersville Elementary and Northeast Jones High School. He was a Lindy-Callahan Scholar-Athlete for the state in 2004.

White attended the University of Mississippi and received an undergraduate degree in economics and political science in 2008. He worked for The Pew Charitable Trusts from 2008-2009 as a State Policy Fellow. In 2008, White was named a Rhodes Scholar. He studied economic and social history at St John's College, Oxford, earning a Master of Science degree, and rowed crew. In 2010, White's home county named March 24 "Shad White Day."

White earned a Juris Doctor degree from Harvard Law School in 2014. While in law school, White was President of the Harvard chapter of the Federalist Society.

== Career ==
In 2010, White worked as Policy and Research Director for Alan Nunnelee's successful campaign for Congress. White was later hired by Phil Bryant to work as Director of Policy in Bryant's office while Bryant was serving as Lieutenant Governor of Mississippi. In 2015, White again worked for Bryant as campaign manager for Bryant's re-election campaign.

From 2016 to 2017, White worked as a litigation attorney at Butler Snow, LLP, in Ridgeland, Mississippi. During that time, he also served as a special prosecutor in Rankin County, Mississippi. In December 2017, White was named as the director of the Mississippi Justice Institute. While White served as Director, the Mississippi Justice Institute successfully defended the constitutionality of charter schools in Mississippi in a trial court and won an Open Meetings Act case against the Lauderdale County Board of Supervisors and Natchez city government.

He is a Certified Fraud Examiner.

=== State auditor ===
On July 6, 2018, Governor Phil Bryant announced that he would appoint White to serve as Mississippi's State Auditor following the resignation of Stacey Pickering. White is the first millennial to serve in a statewide office in the Deep South. Most political observers were surprised by his appointment.

White was elected as State Auditor with no opposition in 2019. He won reelection in 2023 with 59% of the vote.

During his time as State Auditor, White's office has investigated the largest public fraud scheme in state history. White's office also investigated pharmacy benefit managers, resulting in the largest civil settlement from a State Auditor's investigation in state history. White developed a program to increase government efficiency which was modeled after a similar program created by Rob Sand, the Democratic Iowa State Auditor.

In February 2023, Brett Favre filed a defamation lawsuit against White, alleging White made false and defamatory statements related to Favre's ties to the Mississippi welfare scandal. In February 2024, White filed a counter suit as auditor asking the court to require Favre "...to repay the principal and interest he owes on $1.1 million in welfare funds." In August 2024, White published Mississippi Swindle: Brett Favre and the Welfare Scandal that Shocked America, which gives his perspective on the scandal.

In September 2020, White began making a series of statements about a sociology professor at the University of Mississippi, James M. Thomas, and Thomas's participation in Scholar Strike. In December 2020, Thomas filed a defamation suit against White based on those statements. In January 2021, White's motion to dismiss Thomas's lawsuit was denied. In August 2026, White's motion for a summary judgement was also denied.

== Personal life ==
White is married to Rina White (née Thomas); they have two daughters and a son, and live in Flowood, Mississippi. They are members at St. Richard Catholic Church in Jackson.

Party political offices
Preceded by Stacey Pickering	Republican nominee for Auditor of Mississippi; 2019, 2023	Most recent
Political offices
Preceded by Stacey E. Pickering	Auditor of Mississippi; 2018–present	Incumbent
