= Harold Ray Presley =

American politician and sheriff (1948–2001)

Sheriff of Lee County, Mississippi
- In office 1993–2001
- Preceded by: Jack Shirley
- Succeeded by: Larry Presley

Personal details
- Born: October 5, 1948 Tupelo, Mississippi
- Died: July 6, 2001 (aged 52) Tupelo, Mississippi
- Relatives: Brandon Presley (nephew); Elvis Presley (first cousin once removed)

Harold Ray Presley (October 5, 1948 – July 6, 2001) was an American sheriff known for his war on narcotics. He was the elected sheriff of Lee County, Mississippi, from 1993 to 2001. In 1995, he won the Buford Pusser Officer of the Year Award for his tough stance against illegal drugs. According to the Buford Pusser Home and Museum in Adamsville, Tennessee, Presley's department had confiscated more than $1 million in drugs including marijuana.

A cousin of Elvis Presley, he was a popular sheriff. He started a D.A.R.E. program in his department to work with schools and educate children about resisting drug use; he also started GED and work programs for inmates. During Presley's tenure as sheriff, the county built a new juvenile detention center and a jail with capacity for 202 inmates.

On July 6, 2001, Presley died in a shootout with an alleged kidnapper near Tupelo after pushing his deputy to safety. In January 2008, a 7,766-pound monument which had been dedicated in his memory mysteriously vanished after having stood near the Lee County Jail for five-and-a-half years. On July 6, 2022, 21 years after his death, the intersection of Interstate 22 and Auburn Road, Exit 90, in Lee County was dedicated as the Sheriff Harold Ray Presley Memorial Interchange.

== Early life and education ==
Harold Ray was Elvis Presley's first cousin once removed. His father was Noah Presley, a brother of Elvis's grandfather. Noah was a city marshal and mayor of East Tupelo, where Harold Ray grew up. In his youth, Harold Ray had a reputation for getting drunk and getting into fights.

Presley served in the United States Army and fought in the Vietnam War from 1968 to 1970. According to his nephew, Presley completed a GED after finding religion and recovering from alcoholism in the late 1970s. Harold Ray only saw Elvis three times before his famous cousin died in 1977. He attended the police academy in his late thirties.

== Career ==
Presley returned from Vietnam to East Tupelo, where he went to work at the grocery store owned by his lifelong friend, Buddy Palmer. He eventually became a manager at Palmer's Big Star, but after 24 years at the grocery, he decided he wanted a change.

When Sheriff Jack Shirley offered him a job, Presley went to the police academy and joined the sheriff's department as a deputy in 1987. At the time, he joked that he had never ridden in the front seat of a patrol car before, alluding to his past as a rowdy youth. By 1993, Presley was the chief narcotics investigator for the Lee County sheriff's department.

=== Elections ===
In November 1993, Presley was elected sheriff of Lee County in a special election held to fill the remaining two years of Jack Shirley's term, after Shirley died of cancer the previous year. Presley emerged as the frontrunner in a field of 14 candidates, and went on to win a runoff election against Chief Deputy Robert Armstrong, with 5,834 votes or 56 percent of the overall total, according to unofficial returns. Although he played down his connection to Elvis during his campaign, "Presley For Sheriff" political signs became a coveted souvenir among tourists.

Presley then had to run for sheriff again in 1995. According to Brandon Presley, at one event during the election, after the candidates were asked to speak in alphabetical order, his uncle Harold Ray got up and said, "If someone is beating on your door at 2 a.m. and you call the sheriff, which one of us (candidates) do you want to show up?" He was reelected with 66 percent of the vote.

In 1999, Presley was reelected once again with 80 percent of the vote. He remained sheriff of Lee County until his death in 2001.

=== Drug busts ===
Presley enjoyed personifying the tough Southern sheriff and was physically imposing, standing 6-feet 3-inches tall and weighing 285 pounds, with a six-shooter strapped to his hip. In 1995, The Atlanta Journal described him as having "made his mark in Elvis' birthplace as a drug-busting dynamo who patrols in a red Chevy pickup and leads the charge on drug raids, often using his massive frame as a battering ram on doors".

When Presley was selected for the Buford Pusser Law Enforcement Officer of the Year Award in 1995, the Buford Pusser Home and Museum noted that "[Presley's] department of 13 deputies, three criminal investigators, and two narcotics agents have made a big difference in the crime rate in Lee County", having confiscated $1 million in drugs including marijuana and 41 vehicles, and having recovered $300,000 in stolen merchandise. Named after the bat-wielding sheriff of McNairy County, Tennessee, who inspired the 1973 film Walking Tall, the award was given annually for outstanding service in the line of duty; nominations were accepted from Tennessee, Alabama, and Mississippi. Presley traveled to Adamsville, Tennessee, for the ceremony on May 27, 1995, and was presented with a baseball bat bearing Buford Pusser's name in front of hundreds of people. Upon accepting the award, Presley stated that if Pusser was alive, he probably would have joined the war against illegal narcotics.

=== Programs ===
During his tenure as sheriff, Presley introduced numerous programs. He started a Drug Abuse Resistance Education (D.A.R.E.) program in Lee County, sending specially trained deputies to local schools to educate children about the harmful effects of illegal drug use and how to "say no" when encountering peer pressure. The program started in municipalities including Baldwyn, Guntown, Mooreville, Plantersville, Saltillo, and Shannon, as well as the city of Tupelo. It was expanded county-wide after Presley won the support of the Lee County Board of Supervisors to petition the Tennessee state legislature to increase fines levied by the courts to fund D.A.R.E. The bill requested by Presley was signed into law by Governor Kirk Fordice on February 29, 1996. As a result, justice, circuit and county courts increased fines for driving under the influence (DUI), violation of the Controlled Substances Act, and the illegal sale of alcohol to minors by $50, and increased fines for misdemeanors by $5.

Presley also won the "Best of the Best Officers" for five years. After earning his own GED, he provided GED classes for training and testing inmates; he also started a work-center program for the inmates in his jail.

== Personal life ==
Presley was married, and had two sons and a daughter. He helped to look after his nephew Brandon Presley after his father was murdered, taking him riding in his patrol car in the late 1980s. Brandon later ran Presley's first campaign for sheriff.

On the same day that he received the Pusser Award in Adamsville, Tennessee, his son Patrick was arrested for attempted aggravated assault and was later charged with drug possession.

== Death ==
Presley died in the early morning hours of July 6, 2001, in a shootout with kidnapping suspect Billy Ray Stone (who kidnapped and killed Charlene Wright). The suspect had fled the scene of a roadblock and exchanged shots with pursuing officers. He managed to elude officers during a foot chase after crashing his vehicle. Later in the evening, Sheriff Presley received a call from Fellowship Road homeowner Robert Norris whose dogs were barking. Sheriff Presley, Deputy Jack Tate, and Norris entered a building behind the house where, during a gun battle, Presley pushed Deputy Tate clear of gunfire and was struck six times, mortally injured. He fired back at Stone, killing him with one shot. Wright died the following day from injuries she sustained after being ejected from her kidnapper's vehicle during the initial chase.

== Legacy ==
In November of 2001, a special election was held to elect a sheriff to serve the remainder of Presley's term. His brother, retired law enforcement officer Larry Presley, was elected to serve his term.

The State D.A.R.E. Officers' Association in Mississippi named its Officer of the Year Award in Harold Ray Presley's memory.

The Harold Ray Presley Memorial Committee raised funds to build an 8-foot tall, 11-foot wide memorial to honor Presley and five other law enforcement officers killed in the line of duty. The 7,766-pound memorial near the Lee County jail was dedicated in August 2002. It vanished under mysterious circumstances in January 2008, prompting Larry Presley to request a formal investigation into its disappearance.
