= Mike Chaney =

American politician

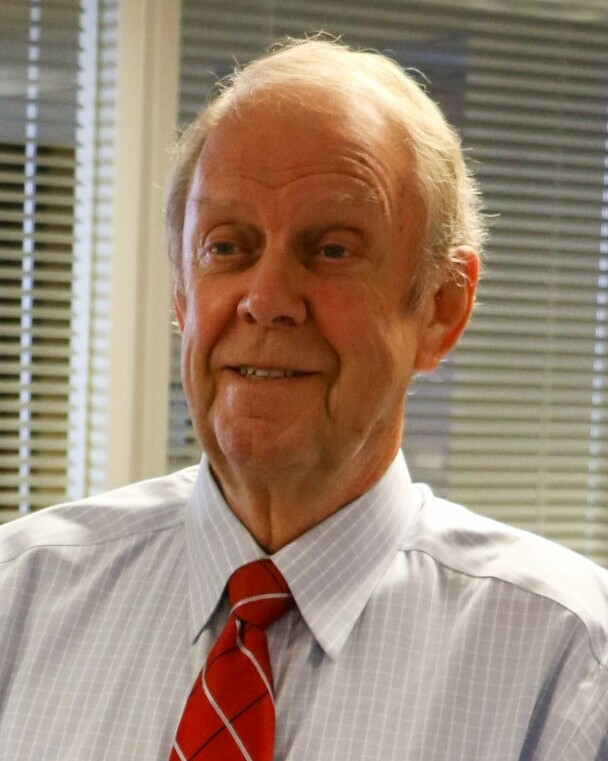

11th Insurance Commissioner of Mississippi
- Incumbent
- Assumed office January 10, 2008
- Governor: Haley Barbour; Phil Bryant; Tate Reeves
- Preceded by: George Dale

Member of the Mississippi State Senate from the 23rd district
- In office January 4, 2000 – January 8, 2008
- Preceded by: Grey Ferris
- Succeeded by: Briggs Hopson

Member of the Mississippi House of Representatives from the 54th district
- In office January 1993 – January 2000
- Preceded by: Ed Buelow
- Succeeded by: Chester Masterson

Personal details
- Born: Michael Jackson Chaney; January 6, 1944 (age 82) Tupelo, Mississippi, U.S.
- Party: Republican
- Spouse: Mary Thurmond
- Education: Mississippi State University (BA)

Military service
- Branch/service: United States Army
- Battles/wars: Vietnam War

Michael Jackson Chaney (born January 6, 1944) is the Commissioner of Insurance for the State of Mississippi since 2008. He served in the Mississippi House of Representatives from 1993 to 1999 and in the Mississippi State Senate from 2000 to 2008. Prior to his time in politics, he pursued business ventures in oil distribution, wood preservation, real estate, and other industries.

== Early life and education ==
Michael Chaney was born in Tupelo, Mississippi on January 6, 1944. He graduated from Mississippi State University in 1966 with a Bachelor of Science in banking and finance. A businessman, Chaney founded an oil distribution business for convenience stores in Vicksburg in the 1970s, followed by ventures into the wood preservation business in Kemper County and real estate. He also pursued business interests in utility companies, farming, and communications companies.

He served in the United States Army during the Vietnam War as a sergeant in the Mississippi Reserve from 1968 to 1969.

== Political career ==
State legislature

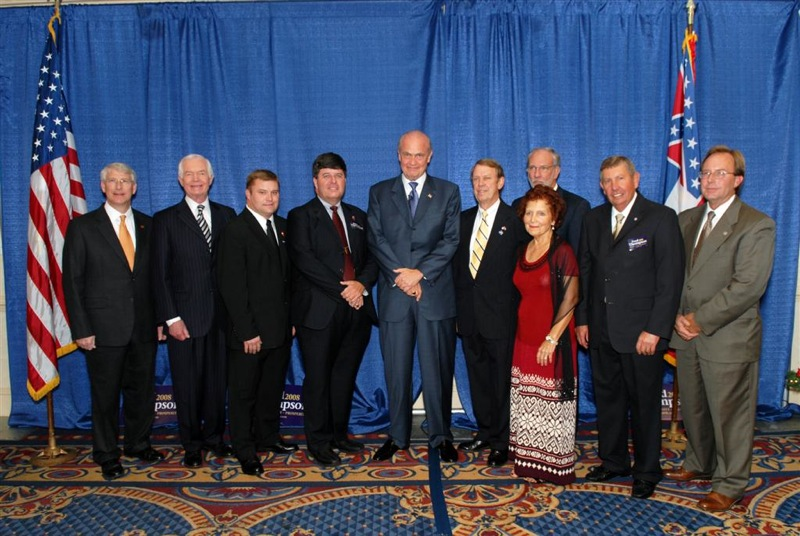
Mike Chaney, 5th from right, in a photo with Fred Thompson and other elected officials from Mississippi in 2007.

A Republican, Chaney served in the Mississippi House of Representatives for the 54th district from 1993 to 1999. He ran to replace Ed Buelow, who had been appointed to the Mississippi Tax Commission. At the time of his campaign, he was the chairman of the Warren County Republican Executive Committee and had served in economic leadership roles in the local area.

In 1999, he ran for election to the Mississippi State Senate for the 23rd district, facing off against Democrat Ken Harper, a former State Senator. During the campaign, he emphasized health care, taxation, education, law enforcement, and economic development issues. He won the election and served the district from 2000 to 2008. While in the senate, he served as chairman of the Education Committee and helped co-write the Mississippi Adequate Education Program. He took a role in reforming building code legislation and was appointed by Amy Tuck to the Mississippi State Flag Commission.

Insurance commissioner

In 2007, he ran for election to become the Mississippi Insurance Commissioner, where he faced off against primary candidate Ronnie English, and later Democratic Gary Anderson in the general election. During the election, he favored increasing competition among insurance companies and maintaining the elected status of the commissioner position. He was accused by Anderson for "cozying up to insurance companies," though Chaney rebuffed said claims. Chaney won the election 56.5% to 43.5%, becoming the first new commissioner since George Dale took office in 1976. Voter discontent towards insurance companies after Hurricane Katrina was considered to play a major role in his victory. Chaney also outraised Anderson significantly. He was sworn-in as insurance commissioner on January 10, 2008.

Chaney was re-elected in 2011 against Louis Fondren 62% to 34.7%. He ran unopposed in the general election in 2015. He was re-elected in 2019 against Robert Amos 61.3% to 38.7%. He was re-elected in 2023 against Bruce Burton 59.3% to 40.7%.

== Personal life ==
He is married to Mary Thurmond Chaney and has three children and eight grandchildren. He lives in Vicksburg, Mississippi. He is of Episcopal faith.

== Electoral history ==
Mississippi State Senate 23rd District Election, 2003
Party	Candidate	Votes	%
Republican	Mike Chaney (inc.)	9,745	56.92
Democratic	Marcie Tanner Southerland	7,377	43.08

Mississippi Insurance Commissioner Republican Primary Election, 2007
Party	Candidate	Votes	%
Republican	Mike Chaney	136,887	78.90
Republican	Ronnie English	36,586	21.10

Mississippi Insurance Commissioner Election, 2007
Party	Candidate	Votes	%
Republican	Mike Chaney	414,718	56.50
Democratic	Gary Anderson	319,287	43.50

Mississippi Insurance Commissioner Election, 2011
Party	Candidate	Votes	%
Republican	Mike Chaney (inc.)	538,008	61.95
Democratic	Louis Fondren	301,185	34.68
Reform	Barbara Dale Washer	29,200	3.36

Mississippi Insurance Commissioner Republican Primary Election, 2015
Party	Candidate	Votes	%
Republican	Mike Chaney (inc.)	194,792	72.56
Republican	John Mosley	73,657	27.44

Mississippi Insurance Commissioner Election, 2015
Party	Candidate	Votes	%
Republican	Mike Chaney (inc.)	585,257	100.00

Party political offices
Preceded by Lucky DuPuy	Republican nominee for Insurance Commissioner of Mississippi; 2007, 2011, 2015, 2019, 2023	Most recent
Political offices
Preceded by George Dale	Insurance Commissioner of Mississippi; 2008–present	Incumbent
