= Timothy L. Johnson =

American politician

Timothy L. "Tim" Johnson

Member of the Mississippi Senate from the 19th district
- In office January 2, 1996 – January 6, 2004
- Preceded by: Pendy Ellard
- Succeeded by: Merle Flowers

Personal details
- Born: Timothy L. Johnson; December 2, 1959 (age 66) Kosciusko, Mississippi, US
- Party: Democratic (2015–present)
- Other political affiliations: Republican (1999–2015)
- Spouse: Lynn Johnson
- Children: 3
- Education: Kosciusko High School; Mississippi State University
- Occupation: Insurance agent Real estate agent

Timothy L. "Tim" Johnson (born December 2, 1959) is an American politician. Johnson was a member of the Mississippi State Senate representing District 19 from 1995 to 2003 as a Republican. The district encompassed Attala, Leake and Madison counties.

Johnson announced on February 4, 2015, that he was switching to the Democratic Party to run for lieutenant governor. He was a Madison alderman before he was elected to the state Senate in 1995. He served two terms in the Senate but did not seek reelection in 2003 because his Senate district was broken apart when legislative maps were redrawn after the 2000 U.S. census. He was a Madison County supervisor from 2004 to 2012.

== Early life, education and career ==
Tim Johnson was born in Kosciusko in Attala County, Mississippi on December 2, 1959. Johnson attended Kosciusko High School and Mississippi State University. Johnson is an insurance agent and realtor.

=== Party switch ===
Johnson cites underfunded schools, refusal to repair infrastructure, the pay gap between men and women, and corruption as reasons why he switched from the Republican Party to the Democratic Party.

However, the primary reason Johnson attributes his decision to switch parties is Republican leadership's refusal to expand Medicaid in Mississippi.

== State Senate ==
In 1995, Johnson won the District 19 Senate election. He served until 2003. Johnson consistently supported legislation to support the Mississippi Highway Patrol, Bureau of Narcotics and local law enforcement officers.

=== Committee assignments ===
Johnson was Vice Chairman of the Forestry Committee. He served with diction on the Finance, Insurance, Juvenile Justice, Municipalities and Veterans and Military Affairs Committees. Johnson was subcommittee Chairman of the Committee on Enrolled Bills, this committee experience representing substantial legislative influence.

== Political campaigns ==
=== 2011 Transportation Commissioner ===
In 2011, he lost in the Republican primary for Central District Transportation Commissioner.

=== 2015 Lieutenant Governor ===
On February 4, 2015, Johnson announced his candidacy for Lieutenant Governor against Republican incumbent Tate Reeves.

== Positions on issues ==
Johnson identifies as a Democrat. Johnson supports full funding of Mississippi public schools. He supports equal pay for equal work, and advocates for improvements in infrastructure. In his 2015 Lieutenant Governor race, Johnson said he fully supports expanding Medicaid, and accepting the federal money to support Mississippi's local hospitals.

In a Senate Resolution commending his "outstanding legislative record and dedicated service," Johnson is described as a champion of law enforcement, school choice and issues enhancing municipal government.

== Personal life ==
Johnson and his wife, Lynn, have three children. Johnson and his family reside in Madison, Mississippi. Johnson is a member of Highlands Presbyterian Church, the Madison Arts Guild, Very Special Arts in Mississippi, and the committee for the March of Dimes. He is well known for his impersonation of Mississippi-born singer Elvis Presley.
