= Mary Coleman (Mississippi politician) =

American politician

Member of the Mississippi House of Representatives from the 65th district
- In office January 1994 – January 5, 2016
- Preceded by: Hillman T. Frazier
- Succeeded by: Chris Bell

Personal details
- Born: July 25, 1946 (age 79) Noxapater, Mississippi, U.S.
- Party: Democratic
- Spouse: Cayle Coleman
- Education: Los Angeles Trade–Technical College; Tougaloo College (BA)
- Profession: Insurance agent, political consultant

Mary H. Coleman (born July 25, 1946) is an American politician. From 1994 to 2015, she served as member of the Mississippi House of Representatives for the 65th district. She did not seek re-election to the House in 2015 and instead ran for a seat on the Central District Transportation Commission. She won in the Democratic primary but lost in the general election to Republican Dick Hall.
