= Cecil Brown (Mississippi politician) =

American politician

Member of the Mississippi Public Service Commission from the Central District
- In office January 2016 – January 1, 2020
- Preceded by: Lynn Posey
- Succeeded by: Brent Bailey

Member of the Mississippi House of Representatives from the 66th district
- In office January 5, 2000 – January 5, 2016
- Preceded by: Ken Stribling
- Succeeded by: Jarvis Dortch

Personal details
- Born: Cecil Charles Brown Jr. June 22, 1944 (age 82) Meridian, Mississippi, U.S.
- Party: Democratic
- Children: 4
- Education: University of Mississippi (BA); University of Texas (MPA)
- Occupation: Investment advisor; politician

Cecil Charles Brown Jr. (born June 22, 1944) is an American politician. He was a member of the Mississippi House of Representatives from the 66th District, from 1999 to 2015. He is a member of the Democratic Party.

In the 1999 general election, Brown defeated three-term Republican incumbent Ken Stribling in what had been considered a fairly safe seat for the Republicans. During his second term, he was appointed to chair the House Education Committee. He was elected to the Mississippi Public Service Commission in 2015 with 53% of the vote. In 2019, he stated he wouldn't seek reelection. In the 2019 general election, Republican Brent Bailey defeated Democratic candidate De'Keither Stamps to succeed Brown on the Commission.
