= 2023 Mississippi elections =

The 2023 Mississippi elections took place on November 7, 2023, with the primary on August 8 and any required runoffs on August 29. All executive offices in the state up for election, as well as all 52 seats of the Mississippi State Senate, all 122 seats in the Mississippi House of Representatives, and many local offices. The qualifying deadline for all 2023 Mississippi races was February 1, 2023.

Special elections also took place during the year.

== Lieutenant governor ==
One-term Republican incumbent Delbert Hosemann was elected in 2019 with 60% of the vote. He ran for re-election.

Republican state senator Chris McDaniel also announced his candidacy, challenging Hosemann.

Republicans Shane Quick (who ran against Hosemann in 2019) and Tiffany Longino also filed for the race, as did Democrat D. Ryan Grover, a former candidate for the Oxford Board of Aldermen.

== Secretary of state ==
Mississippi Secretary of State election, 2023
- November 7, 2023

Nominee	Michael Watson	Ty Pinkins
Party	Republican	Democratic
Popular vote	481,895	328,067
Percentage	59.5%	40.5%
- Watson: 50–60% 60–70% 70–80% 80–90% Pinkins: 50–60% 60–70% 70–80% 80–90%
Secretary of State before election
Michael Watson
Republican
Elected Secretary of State
Michael Watson
Republican

After considering challenging Tate Reeves in the 2023 Mississippi gubernatorial election, Michael Watson instead decided to run for re-election as Secretary of State.

Former Mississippi Secretary of State Staffer and 2022 Democratic nominee for Mississippi's 3rd congressional district Shuwaski Young announced his bid to unseat Watson.

=== Republican primary ===
==== Candidate ====
- Michael Watson, incumbent secretary of state

==== Results ====
Republican primary results
Party	Candidate	Votes	%
Republican	Michael Watson (incumbent)	351,774	100.00%
Total votes		351,774	100.00%

=== Democratic primary ===
==== Candidate ====
- Shuwaski Young, former Mississippi Secretary of State Staffer and 2022 Democratic nominee for Mississippi's 3rd congressional district

==== Results ====
Democratic primary results
Party	Candidate	Votes	%
Democratic	Shuwaski Young	152,115	100.00%
Total votes		152,115	100.00%

==== Democratic State Central Committee selection ====
In August 2023, Shuwaski Young withdrew his candidacy from the race for secretary of state, citing "a hypertensive crisis that was limiting his ability to campaign." On September 7, the Mississippi Democratic Party nominated Ty Pinkins, an attorney and military veteran, as the replacement nominee for the November ballot.

=== General election ===
==== Polling ====
Hypothetical polling

Michael Watson vs. Shuwaski Young

Poll source	Date(s) administered	Sample size (Note: Key: A – all adults RV – registered voters LV – likely voters V – unclear)	Margin of error	Michael Watson (R)	Shuwaski Young (D)	Other	Undecided
Mississippi Today/Siena College	August 20–28, 2023	650 (LV)	± 4.0%	56%	33%	1% (Note: "Not going to vote" with 1%)	10%

==== Results ====
2023 Mississippi Secretary of State election
Party	Candidate	Votes	%	±%
Republican	Michael Watson (incumbent)	481,895	59.50%	+0.67%
Democratic	Ty Pinkins	328,067	40.50%	–0.67%
Total votes		809,962	100.00%	
Republican hold				

== Attorney general ==
One-term Republican incumbent Lynn Fitch was elected in 2019 with 57.83% of the vote, becoming the state's first Republican attorney general since 1878. She ran for re-election.

Democratic attorney and Disability Rights Mississippi Litigation Director Greta Kemp Martin ran to challenge Fitch.

== State auditor ==
Mississippi State Auditor election, 2023
- November 7, 2023
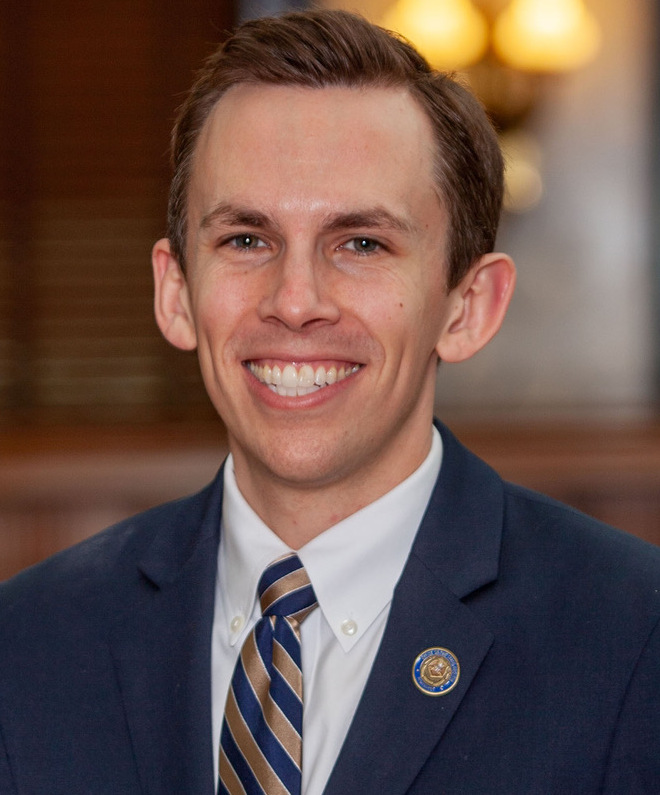

Nominee	Shad White	Larry Bradford
Party	Republican	Democratic
Popular vote	474,313	334,418
Percentage	58.6%	41.4%
- White: 50–60% 60–70% 70–80% 80–90% Bradford: 50–60% 60–70% 70–80% 80–90%
State Auditor before election
Shad White
Republican
Elected State Auditor
Shad White
Republican

Incumbent Republican Shad White was appointed as auditor in 2018, winning his first full term unopposed in 2019. White ran for re-election.

The mayor of Anguilla, Democrat Larry Bradford, challenged White in the general election.

=== Republican primary ===
==== Candidate ====
- Shad White, incumbent state auditor

==== Results ====
Republican primary results
Party	Candidate	Votes	%
Republican	Shad White (incumbent)	347,921	100.00%
Total votes		347,921	100.00%

=== Democratic primary ===
==== Candidate ====
- Larry Bradford, Mayor of Anguilla

==== Results ====
Democratic primary results
Party	Candidate	Votes	%
Democratic	Larry Bradford	153,039	100.00%
Total votes		153,039	100.00%

=== General election ===
==== Results ====
2023 Mississippi State Auditor election
Party	Candidate	Votes	%	±%
Republican	Shad White (incumbent)	474,313	58.65%	N/A
Democratic	Larry Bradford	334,418	41.35%	N/A
Total votes		808,731	100.0%	
Republican hold				

== State treasurer ==
Mississippi State Treasurer election, 2023
- November 7, 2023
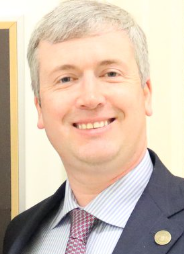

Nominee	David McRae	Addie Lee Green
Party	Republican	Democratic
Popular vote	472,705	337,008
Percentage	58.4%	41.6%
- McRae: 50–60% 60–70% 70–80% 80–90% Green: 50–60% 60–70% 70–80% 80–90%
State Treasurer before election
David McRae
Republican
Elected State Treasurer
David McRae
Republican

One-term Republican incumbent David McRae was elected in 2019 with 60.8% of the vote. He ran for re-election, and was unopposed in the Republican primary.

McRae faced a rematch in the general election, as former member of the Bolton Board of Aldermen Addie Lee Green was the only Democrat to announce a run. Lee Green received 39.2% of the vote in 2019.

=== Republican primary ===
==== Candidate ====
- David McRae, incumbent state treasurer

==== Results ====
Republican primary results
Party	Candidate	Votes	%
Republican	David McRae (incumbent)	349,800	100.00%
Total votes		349,800	100.00%

=== Democratic primary ===
==== Candidate ====
- Addie Lee Green, former member of the Bolton Board of Aldermen

==== Results ====
Democratic primary results
Party	Candidate	Votes	%
Democratic	Addie Lee Green	153,149	100.00%
Total votes		153,149	100.00%

=== General election ===
==== Results ====
2023 Mississippi State Treasurer election
Party	Candidate	Votes	%	±%
Republican	David McRae (incumbent)	472,705	58.38%	−2.42%
Democratic	Addie Lee Green	337,008	41.62%	+2.42%
Total votes		809,713	100.0%	
Republican hold				

== Commissioner of Agriculture and Commerce ==
Mississippi Commissioner of Agriculture and Commerce election, 2023
- November 7, 2023
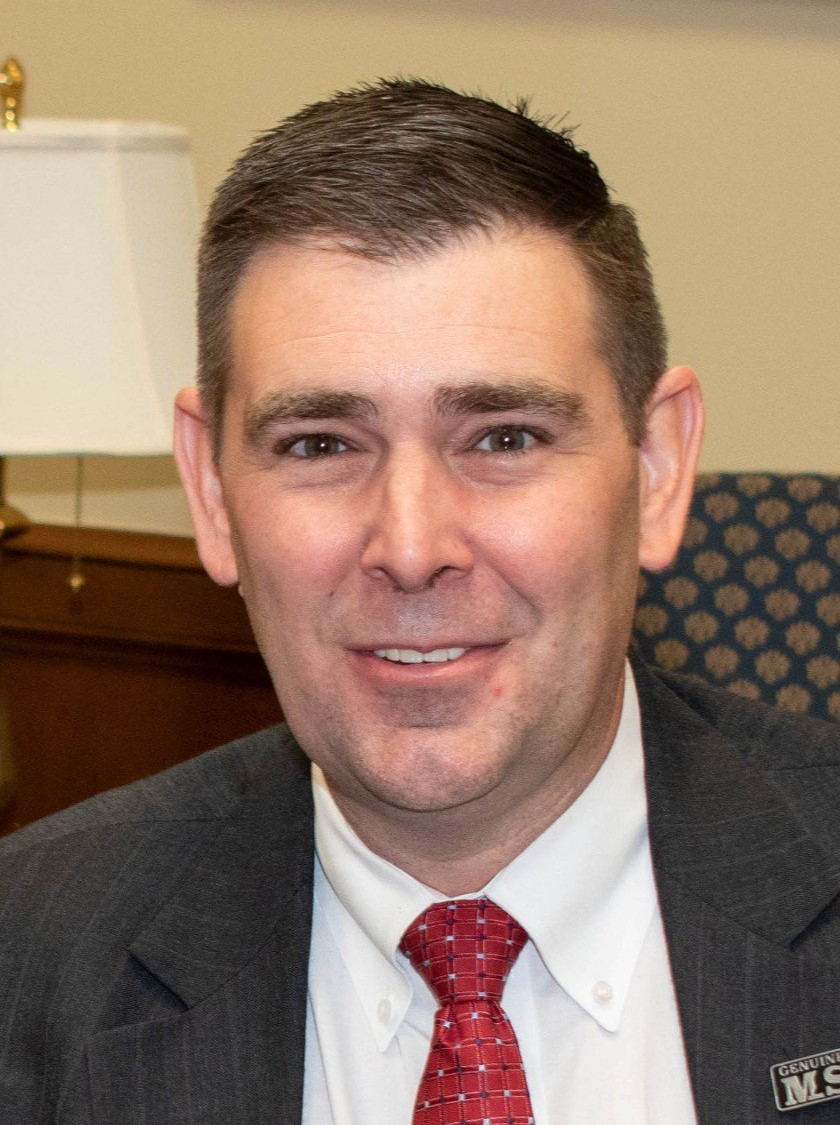

Nominee	Andy Gipson	Robert Bradford
Party	Republican	Democratic
Popular vote	467,901	342,172
Percentage	57.8%	42.2%
- County results Gipson: 50–60% 60–70% 70–80% 80–90% Bradford: 50–60% 60–70% 70–80% 80–90%
Agriculture Commissioner before election
Andy Gipson
Republican
Elected Agriculture Commissioner
Andy Gipson
Republican

Two-term Republican incumbent Andy Gipson was re-elected in 2019 with 58.7% of the vote. Gipson ran for re-election, and was the only Republican on the ballot.

=== Republican primary ===
==== Candidates ====
- Andy Gipson, incumbent Commissioner of Agriculture and Commerce

==== Results ====
Republican primary results
Party	Candidate	Votes	%
Republican	Andy Gipson (incumbent)	351,194	100.00%
Total votes		351,194	100.00%

=== Democratic primary ===
==== Candidates ====
- Robert Bradford, director of Natchez-Adams County Homeland Security Program, Floodplain Management Program, Emergency 9-1-1 Coordinator, and Emergency Management Agency
- Bethany Hill, executive director of the Mississippi Women's Cannabis Chamber of Commerce
- Terry Rogers II, college student

==== Withdrawn or disqualified ====
- Robert Briggs

==== Results ====
Democratic primary results
Party	Candidate	Votes	%
Democratic	Robert Bradford	97,717	51.75%
Democratic	Bethany Hill	49,032	25.97%
Democratic	Terry Rogers II	42,079	22.28%
Total votes		188,828	100.00%

=== General election ===
==== Results ====
2023 Mississippi Agriculture Commissioner election
Party	Candidate	Votes	%	±%
Republican	Andy Gipson (incumbent)	467,901	57.76%	–0.94%
Democratic	Robert Bradford	342,172	42.24%	+0.94%
Total votes		810,073	100.0%	
Republican hold				

== Commissioner of Insurance ==
Mississippi Commissioner of Insurance election, 2023
- November 7, 2023
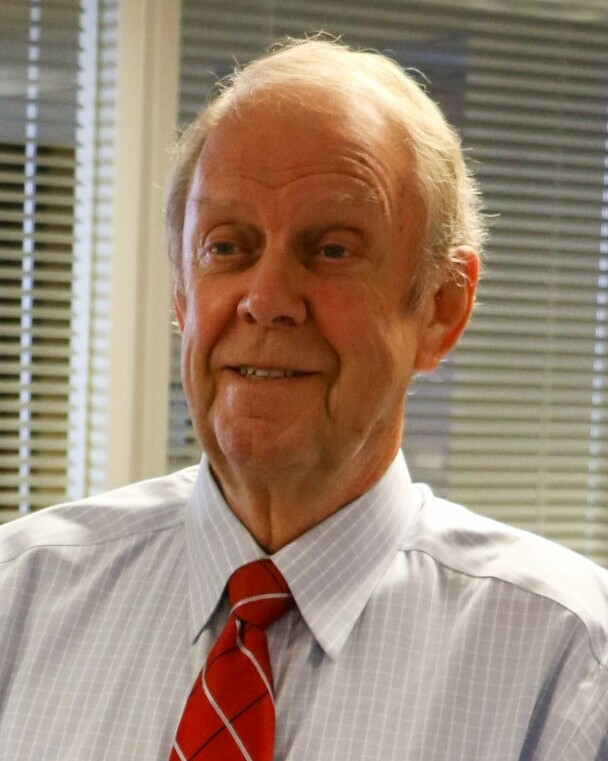

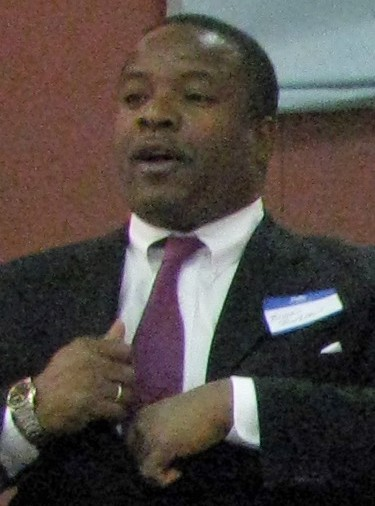
Nominee	Mike Chaney	Bruce Burton
Party	Republican	Democratic
Popular vote	480,514	329,214
Percentage	59.3%	40.7%
- County results Chaney: 50–60% 60–70% 70–80% 80–90% Burton: 50–60% 60–70% 70–80% 80–90%
Insurance Commissioner before election
Mike Chaney
Republican
Elected Insurance Commissioner
Mike Chaney
Republican

Four-term Republican incumbent Mike Chaney was reelected in 2019 with 61.26% of the vote. Chaney, who also serves as the state's Fire Marshal, ran for re-election.

Republican Mitch Young, a former U.S. Navy Petty Officer and candidate for governor in 2015, announced a primary challenge against Chaney.

Democratic attorney and 2022 Court of Appeals in District Four candidate Bruce Burton also ran.

=== Republican primary ===
==== Candidates ====
- Mike Chaney, incumbent commissioner
- Mitch Young, former U.S. Navy Petty officer and candidate for governor in 2015

==== Results ====
Republican primary results
Party	Candidate	Votes	%
Republican	Mike Chaney (incumbent)	201,552	80.3%
Republican	Mitch Young	49,487	19.7%
Total votes		251,039	100.00%

=== Democratic primary ===
==== Candidates ====
- Bruce Burton, attorney and candidate for Appeals Court District 4 in 2022

==== Results ====
Democratic primary results
Party	Candidate	Votes	%
Democratic	Bruce Burton	182,701	100.00%
Total votes		182,701	100.00%

=== General election ===
==== Results ====
2023 Mississippi Insurance Commissioner election
Party	Candidate	Votes	%	±%
Republican	Mike Chaney (incumbent)	480,514	59.34%	–1.92%
Democratic	Bruce Burton	329,214	40.66%	+1.92%
Total votes		809,728	100.0%	
Republican hold				

== Public Service Commission ==
=== Northern District ===
Mississippi Public Service Commissioner, Northern District election, 2023
- November 7, 2023
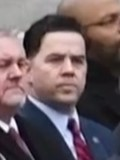
Nominee	Chris Brown
Party	Republican
Popular vote	215,257
Percentage	100.0%
Northern District Commissioner before election
Brandon Presley
Democratic
Elected Northern District Commissioner
Chris Brown
Republican

Four-term Democratic Incumbent Brandon Presley was re-elected unopposed in 2019. Presley did not run for a fifth term, instead opting to run for governor.

No Democrats filed to run to succeed Presley, leaving the field open for two Republican challengers to run for the open seat:

- Chris Brown, Mississippi State Representative for the 20th District
- Tanner Newman, Tupelo Planning and Zoning Administrator

Mandy Gunasekara, former Chief of Staff for the Environmental Protection Agency, was a challenger, but she was removed from the ballot due to citizenship eligibility issues.

==== Republican primary ====
===== Candidates =====
- Chris Brown, Mississippi State Representative
- Tanner Newman, Tupelo Planning and Zoning Administrator

===== Results =====
Republican primary results
Party	Candidate	Votes	%
Republican	Chris Brown	78,272	61.27%
Republican	Tanner Newman	49,472	38.73%
Total votes		127,744	100.00%

==== Results ====
Mississippi Public Service Commissioner Northern District election, 2023
Party	Candidate	Votes	%	±%
Republican	Chris Brown	215,257	100.0	+100.0
Republican gain from Democratic				

=== Central District ===
Mississippi Public Service Commissioner, Central District election, 2023
- November 7, 2023
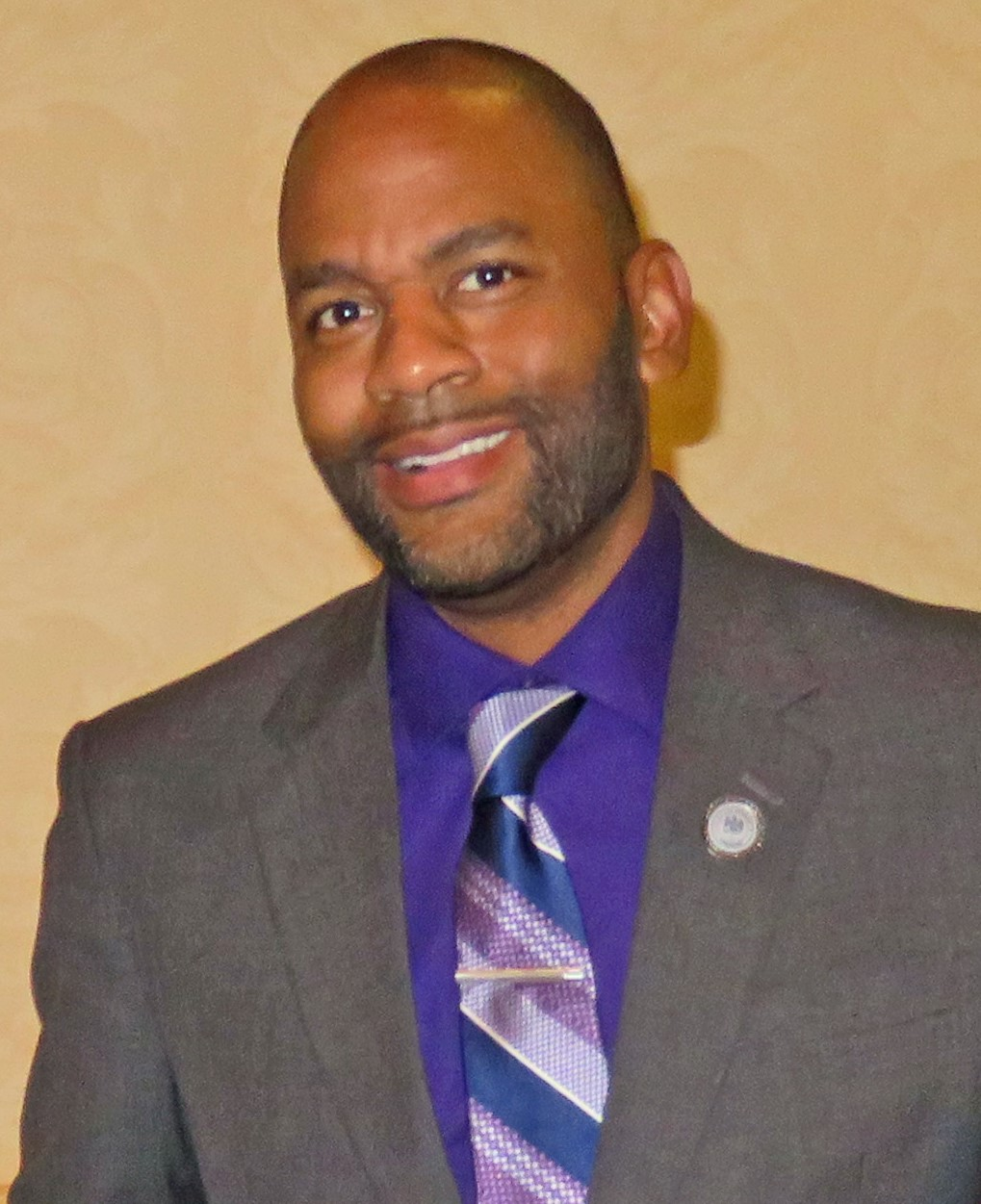

Nominee	De’Keither Stamps	Brent Bailey
Party	Democratic	Republican
Popular vote	138,741	132,853
Percentage	51.1%	48.9%
- County results Stamps: 50–60% 60–70% 70–80% 80–90% Bailey: 50–60% 60–70% 70–80%
Central District Commissioner before election
Brent Bailey
Republican
Elected Central District Commissioner
De'Keither Stamps
Democratic

One-term Republican incumbent Brent Bailey was elected in 2019 with 50.3% of the vote. He ran for re-election.

Bailey's 2019 Democratic opponent, current state representative De’Keither Stamps, faced him again in a rematch.

==== Democratic primary ====
===== Candidate =====
- De’Keither Stamps, State Representative

===== Results =====
Democratic primary results
Party	Candidate	Votes	%
Democratic	De’Keither Stamps	52,152	100.00%
Total votes		52,152	100.00%

==== Republican primary ====
===== Candidate =====
- Brent Bailey, incumbent Public Service Commissioner

===== Results =====
Republican primary results
Party	Candidate	Votes	%
Republican	Brent Bailey (incumbent)	85,778	100.00%
Total votes		85,778	100.00%

==== Results ====
Mississippi Public Service Commissioner Central District election, 2023
Party	Candidate	Votes	%	±%
Democratic	De’Keither Stamps	138,741	51.1	+1.4
Republican	Brent Bailey (incumbent)	132,853	48.9	–1.4
Total votes		271,594	100.00	
Democratic gain from Republican				

=== Southern District ===
Mississippi Public Service Commissioner, Southern District election, 2023
- November 7, 2023
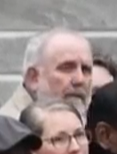
Nominee	Nelson Wayne Carr
Party	Republican
Popular vote	216,698
Percentage	100.0%
Southern District Commissioner before election
Dane Maxwell
Republican
Elected Southern District Commissioner
Nelson Wayne Carr
Republican

One-term Republican Incumbent Dane Maxwell was elected in 2019 with 62.6% of the vote. Maxwell was challenged in the primary by Nelson Wayne Carr and lost.

==== Republican primary ====
===== Candidates =====
- Nelson Wayne Carr, construction manager, landlord, and Republican Party activist
- Dane Maxwell, incumbent Public Service Commissioner

===== Results =====
Republican primary results
Party	Candidate	Votes	%
Republican	Nelson Wayne Carr	76,162	52.89%
Republican	Dane Maxwell (incumbent)	67,849	47.11%
Total votes		144,011	100.00%

==== Results ====
Mississippi Public Service Commissioner Southern District election, 2023
Party	Candidate	Votes	%	±%
Republican	Nelson Wayne Carr	216,698	100.0	+37.4
Total votes		216,698	100.0	
Republican hold				

== Transportation Commission ==
=== Northern District ===
Mississippi Transportation Commissioner, Northern District election, 2023
- November 7, 2023
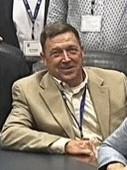
Nominee	John Caldwell
Party	Republican
Popular vote	214,325
Percentage	100.0%
Northern District Commissioner before election
John Caldwell
Republican
Elected Northern District Commissioner
John Caldwell
Republican

One-term Republican Incumbent John Caldwell was elected in 2019 with 63.2% of the vote. He ran for re-election unopposed.

==== Republican primary ====
===== Candidate =====
- John Caldwell, incumbent Transportation Commissioner

===== Results =====
Republican primary results
Party	Candidate	Votes	%
Republican	John Caldwell (incumbent)	120,678	100.00%
Total votes		120,678	100.00%

==== Results ====
Mississippi Transportation Commissioner Northern District election, 2023
Party	Candidate	Votes	%	±%
Republican	John Caldwell (incumbent)	214,325	100.0	+36.8
Total votes		214,325	100.0	
Republican hold				

=== Central District ===
Mississippi Transportation Commissioner, Central District election, 2023
- November 7, 2023
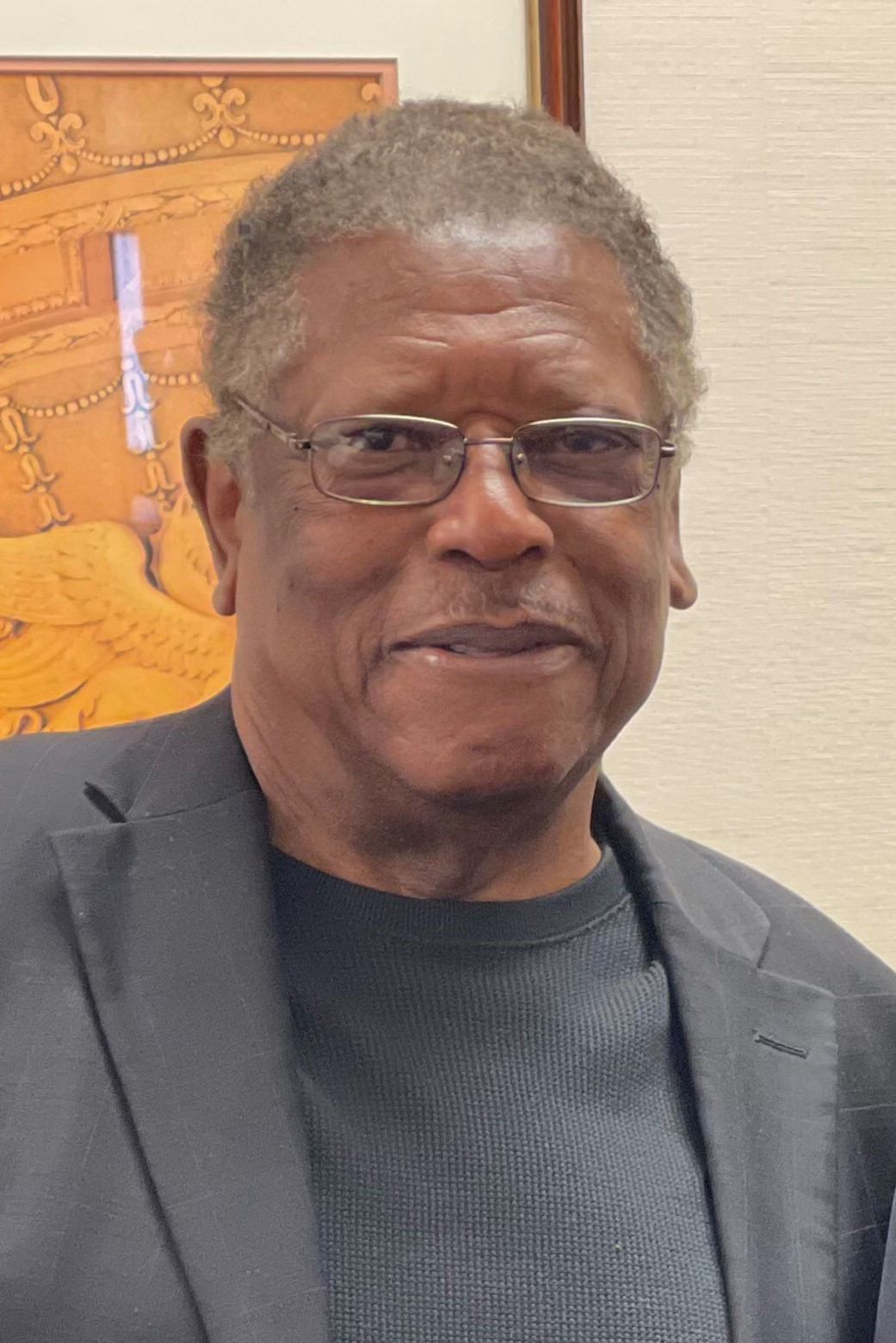

Nominee	Willie Simmons	Ricky Pennington Jr.
Party	Democratic	Republican
Popular vote	150,296	121,866
Percentage	55.2%	44.8%
- County results Simmons: 50–60% 60–70% 70–80% 80–90% Pennington: 50–60% 60–70% 70–80%
Central District Commissioner before election
Willie Simmons
Democratic
Elected Central District Commissioner
Willie Simmons
Democratic

One-term Democratic incumbent Willie Simmons was elected in 2019 with 51.1% of the vote. He ran for re-election.

Ricky Pennington Jr., a Republican, also ran for the seat.

==== Democratic primary ====
===== Candidate =====
- Willie Simmons, incumbent Transportation Commissioner

===== Results =====
Democratic primary results
Party	Candidate	Votes	%
Democratic	Willie Simmons (incumbent)	54,638	100.00%
Total votes		54,638	100.00%

==== Republican primary ====
===== Candidate =====
- Ricky Pennington Jr., candidate for this district in 2019

===== Results =====
Republican primary results
Party	Candidate	Votes	%
Republican	Ricky Pennington Jr.	85,180	100.00%
Total votes		85,180	100.00%

==== Results ====
Mississippi Transportation Commissioner Central District election, 2023
Party	Candidate	Votes	%	±%
Democratic	Willie Simmons (incumbent)	150,296	55.2	+4.1
Republican	Ricky Pennington Jr.	121,866	44.8	−4.1
Total votes		272,162	100.0	
Democratic hold				

=== Southern District ===
Mississippi Transportation Commissioner, Southern District election, 2023
- November 7, 2023
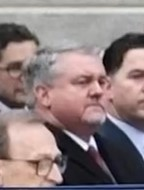

Nominee	Charles Busby	Steven Brian Griffin
Party	Republican	Independent
Popular vote	177,277	69,685
Percentage	71.8%	28.2%
- County results Bubsy: 50–60% 60–70% 70–80% 80–90% Griffin: 50–60%
Southern District Commissioner before election
Tom King
Republican
Elected Southern District Commissioner
Charles Busby
Republican

Three-term Republican incumbent Tom King won re-election unopposed in 2019. On November 16, 2022, King announced he would not seek re-election.

Republican state representative for the 111th District Charles Busby ran against Independent Steven Brian Griffin.

==== Republican primary ====
===== Candidate =====
- Charles Busby, State Representative

===== Results =====
Republican primary results
Party	Candidate	Votes	%
Republican	Charles Busby	140,425	100.00%
Total votes		140,425	100.00%

==== Results ====
Mississippi Transportation Commissioner Southern District election, 2023
Party	Candidate	Votes	%	±%
Republican	Charles Busby	177,277	71.8	−28.2
Independent	Steven Brian Griffin	69,685	28.2	+28.2
Total votes		246,962	100.0	
Republican hold				
