= Connie Moran =

American politician (born 1956)

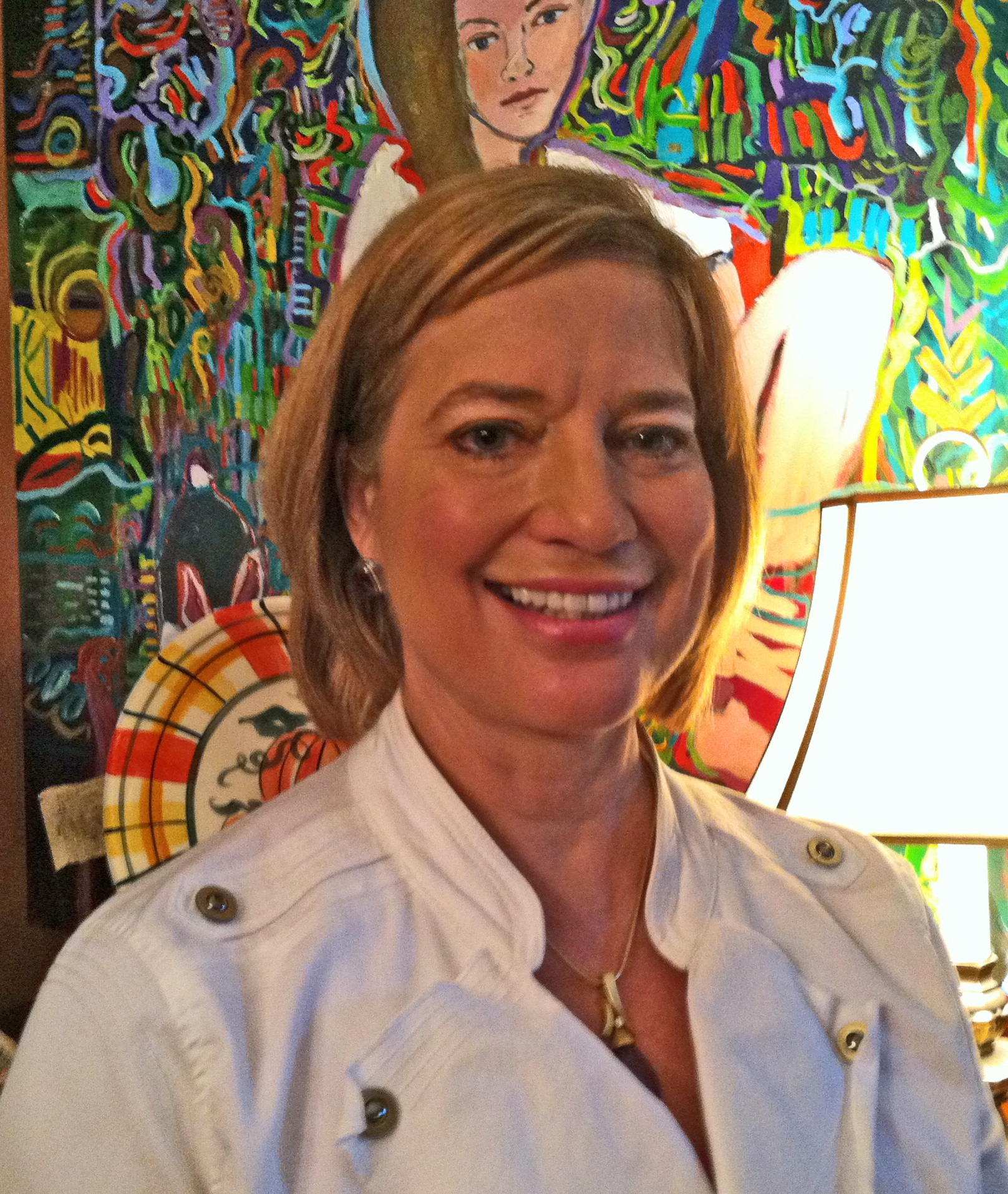

Mayor of Ocean Springs, Mississippi
- In office June 2005 – June 2017

Personal details
- Born: Connie Moran; May 18, 1956 (age 70) Ocean Springs, Mississippi, U.S.
- Party: Democratic
- Children: Magdeleine
- Education: Georgetown University (B.A., M.A.)

Connie Moran (born May 18, 1956) is an American politician and the former mayor of Ocean Springs, Mississippi. She was defeated after three terms by Republican candidate Shea Dobson in the June 6, 2017 election. First elected to the position in 2005, Moran served three terms as mayor of the city. She was re-elected in 2009 and 2013, winning 62% of the vote in the latter year. Moran has served as president of Moran Consultants, a firm providing marketing and development service. She also served for three years as director of Jackson County Economic Development, and for five years before that as managing director of the State of Mississippi European Office in Frankfurt, Germany, where she recruited new business to the state.

== Early life ==
Moran was born May 18, 1956, and was adopted as a child. Moran is a native of Ocean Springs. Moran's family has been in business in Ocean Springs for over 140 years. Her grandfather, A. P. "Fred" Moran, was a county supervisor for 40 years, and her father, John Duncan Moran, was a city alderman.

== Education ==
Moran graduated from Georgetown University with bachelor's and master's degrees in finance/economics and international commerce. She graduated cum laude. Moran conducted graduate research at the Institute of World Economics in Germany as a Fulbright Scholar. She was also an economist at the World Trade Organization in Geneva. She is a former Robert Bosch Foundation Fellow, where she worked for the German Ministry of Finance. In 2006, she was selected to be the Bosch Alumna of the Year for her leadership in Hurricane Katrina recovery efforts.

== Political career ==
=== Mayorship ===
Moran was elected mayor of Ocean Springs in 2005. She was re-elected in 2009 and 2013. She was defeated in her re-election bid by Republican challenger Shea Dobson on June 6, 2017.

==== Hurricane Katrina ====
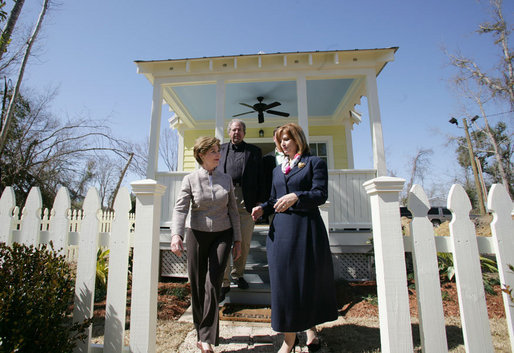
Mayor Connie Moran (right) talks with First Lady Laura Bush during a tour of Katrina Cottages, the quaint, colorful, and quickly built cottages for post-Katrina living.

Hurricane Katrina hit the Gulf Coast six weeks after Moran took office as mayor in 2005. When Katrina destroyed 150 miles of coastline on August 29, 2005, Ocean Spring's waterfront was devastated, but the historic downtown suffered no storm surge, and the damage was limited to roofs, windows and storefronts. Moran drew on her background as an economic development expert to develop a plan to rebuild the city, structurally and economically, while trying to retain the city's historical value and contain urban sprawl while still advocating for growth.

The mayor first gained national attention when she locked horns with the Federal Emergency Management Agency (FEMA). Moran preferred "Katrina Cottages" to standard-issue mobile homes, which would likely not be used as permanent housing. Moran said she wanted to be sure one of the oldest French colonies in the country (Ocean Springs was founded in 1699) maintained an element of traditionalism even as it recovered from the storm. FEMA allocated almost $400 million to bring in the alternate structures.

First Lady Laura Bush toured Ocean Springs and the Katrina Cottages with Moran in February 2007.

=== Treasurer campaign ===
Moran ran for Mississippi State Treasurer in 2011. She received the Democratic Party nomination, but was defeated by Republican candidate Lynn Fitch in the general election.

=== Public Service Commissioner Campaign ===
Moran ran for the Public Service Commission in the Southern District in 2019, and won the Democratic nomination with 78.3% of the vote. She faced Dane Maxwell, Mayor of Pascagoula in the general election and lost.

== Personal life ==
Moran has one daughter, Magdeleine, born in 1995, who has cerebral palsy and autism. Moran is a Catholic; her official biography describes her as a "lifelong member" of St. Alphonsus Catholic Church. Moran, who was adopted, met her birth mother, Claudia Fishburne Rogers, for the first time in 2005.

Moran is active in civic and charitable organizations, and has served as a board director for Jackson County United Way, YMCA, and Boys and Girls Clubs. She is a member of Rotary International, and board director for the Friends of Mary C for Arts, Culture and Education, Girl Scouts of South Mississippi, and the League of Women Voters of the Mississippi Gulf Coast. Moran has served on the National Board of Directors for the Congress on New Urbanism. She has also served on the Jackson County Port Authority of Commissioners, the Board of Trustees of the Walter Anderson Museum of Art, and the Governor's Commission on Developmental Disabilities.

Party political offices
Preceded by Shawn O'Hara	Democratic nominee for Mississippi State Treasurer; 2011	Vacant Title next held by Addie Lee Green
