= Fabian Nelson =

American politician

Member of the Mississippi House of Representatives from the 66th district
- Incumbent
- Assumed office January 2, 2024
- Preceded by: De'Keither Stamps

Personal details
- Born: July 17, 1985 (age 41) Yazoo City, Mississippi
- Party: Democratic
- Children: Octavius Nelson
- Education: Holmes Community College (AA), Jackson State University (BS), American Public University (MBA); Harvard Kennedy School
- Website: www.nelson66.com

Fabian Nelson (born July 17, 1985) is an American politician and real estate broker serving as a Democratic member of the Mississippi House of Representatives from the 66th district. Elected in 2023, he became the first openly gay person elected to the Mississippi Legislature.

== Early life and career ==
Nelson was born on July 17, 1985, in Yazoo City, Mississippi. He received an associate degree in business from Holmes Community College, a bachelor's degree in biology from Jackson State University and a Master of Business Administration from American Public University. Before entering the Legislature, he worked as a real estate broker.

== Political career ==
Nelson first sought the District 66 seat in a 2020 special election. He received 33 votes and did not advance to the runoff.

Nelson ran again in 2023 following incumbent De'Keither Stamps' decision to seek a seat on the Mississippi Public Service Commission. Nelson defeated Byram alderwoman Roshunda Harris-Allen in the Democratic primary runoff with about 69% of the vote. Because no Republican sought the seat, Nelson was unopposed in the general election. He took office on January 2, 2024.

During his first legislative session, Nelson authored House Bill 1137, which expanded the types of organizations eligible to receive and administer naloxone, a medication used to reverse opioid overdoses. The legislation passed both chambers unanimously and was signed into law in May 2024. In its first two months, the expanded state program distributed 3,470 boxes of naloxone.

In 2024, Nelson was selected for the Future Caucus Innovation Fellowship's criminal justice reform cohort.

== Personal life ==
Nelson lives in Byram, Mississippi. He is gay and is the father of four sons. Before his election, he served on the board of Capital City Pride and on the Mississippi Department of Health's HIV Planning Council.
