= Charles Busby =

Charles Busby may refer to:

- Charles Busby (architect) (1786–1834), English architect
- Charles Busby (politician) (born 1963), American politician
