= Sarita Simmons =

American female politician

Member of the Mississippi Senate from the 13th district
- Incumbent
- Assumed office January 7, 2020
- Preceded by: Willie Lee Simmons

Personal details
- Born: Sarita Simmons; May 14, 1977 (age 49) Cleveland, Mississippi, U.S.
- Party: Democratic
- Education: Alcorn State University (BS)

Sarita Simmons (born May 14, 1977) is an American politician, serving in the Mississippi State Senate from the 13th district since 2020.

== Early life and education ==
Simmons was born in Cleveland, Mississippi. Her father is Willie Lee Simmons, former Mississippi Senate member from the 13th district and current Central District Transportation Commissioner. Her mother Rosie Simmons was the Bolivar County Circuit Clerk, the first African American since Reconstruction to serve that post.

Simmons graduated from Cleveland High School in 1995 and graduated from Alcorn State University with a Bachelor's of Science in Educational Psychology in 1999. After graduating, she moved to Georgia to work in education and behavioral health. Before moving back to Mississippi, she was working in drug rehabilitation and outreach in Atlanta.

== Career ==
Simmons moved back to Mississippi in 2004 to manage the family-owned soul food restaurant in Cleveland, Mississippi.

When her father did not file for re-election for the 13th district — which encompasses parts of Bolivar, Sunflower, and Tallahatchie counties — Simmons ran for the seat. She received a little over 42 percent of the vote in the Democratic primary runoff election and about 65 percent in the general election. She assumed office on January 7, 2020. She is the first Black woman to hold the seat.

For the 2024-2028 session in the Mississippi Senate, she serves as vice-chair for the Investigate State Offices Committee and is a member on the following committees: Agriculture; Appropriations; Corrections; Education, Ethics, Housing, Labor, and Tourism.

== Political positions ==
Simmons, in partnership with Senator Walter Michel, authored a bill to allow wine sales in grocery stores; the bipartisan bill died in committee.

In coordination with several Delta Legislators, Simmons created a multistep plan to address conditions at the Mississippi State Penitentiary in Sunflower County, an infamous prison located in Simmon's 13th district. This came after lawmakers proposed additional cuts for funding to the Mississippi Department of Corrections.

She voted for changing the Mississippi state flag.

== Personal life ==
She is a member of the Delta Sigma Theta sorority, NAACP, National Council of Negro Women, and the Bolivar County Democratic Executive Committee. She is Baptist.
