= Senator Crook =

Senator Crook may refer to:

- Robert Crook (1929–2011), Mississippi State Senate
- Thomas Crook (1798–1879), New York State Senate
- Thurman C. Crook (1891–1981), Indiana State Senate
