= 2011 Mississippi elections =

A general election was held in the U.S. state of Mississippi on November 8, 2011. All of Mississippi's executive offices were up for election, as well as legislative elections for the State Senate and House of Representatives. Primary elections were held on August 2, 2011, with runoff elections on the 24th if needed. General election runoffs were held on November 29 if needed. Election results were certified by the Mississippi Secretary of State on December 8.

== Governor ==
Incumbent Republican Governor of Mississippi Haley Barbour was unable to run for a third term due to term limits. Republican Lieutenant Governor Phil Bryant defeated Democratic Hattiesburg Mayor Johnny DuPree in the general election.

== Lieutenant governor ==
Mississippi Lieutenant Gubernatorial election, 2011
- November 8, 2011
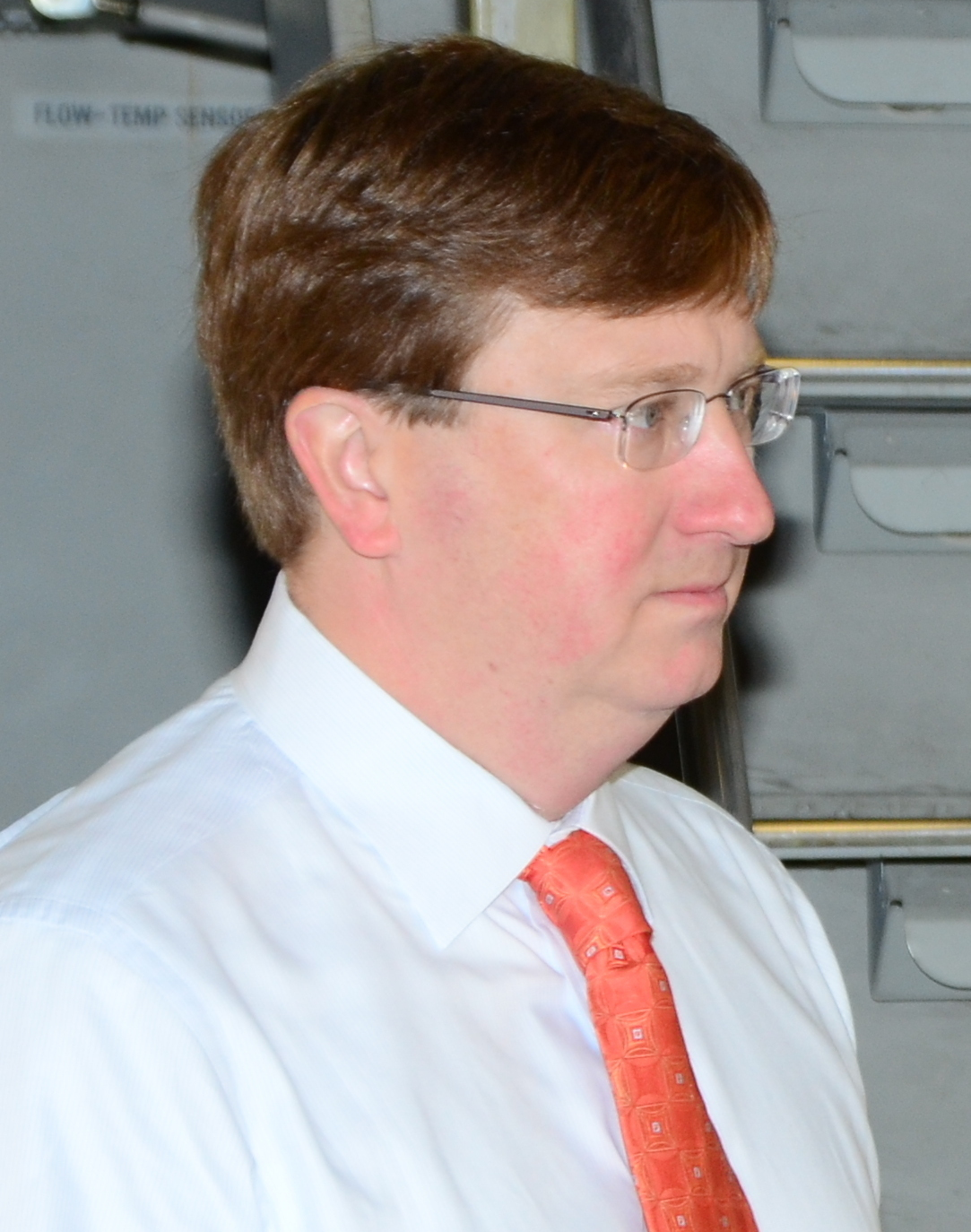

Nominee	Tate Reeves	Tracella Lou O'Hara Hill
Party	Republican	Reform
Electoral vote	121	1
Popular vote	644,205	157,547
Percentage	80.3%	19.6%
- County results Reeves: 50–60% 60–70% 70–80% 80–90% >90% Hill: 50–60%
Lieutenant Governor before election
Phil Bryant
Republican
Elected Lieutenant Governor
Tate Reeves
Republican

Incumbent Lieutenant Governor Phil Bryant did not seek reelection, instead opting to run for the governorship. Republican State Treasurer Tate Reeves defeated Reform Party candidate Tracella Lou O'Hara Hill in the general election.

=== Reform nomination ===
==== Candidate ====
- Tracella Lou O'Hara Hill

=== Republican primary ===
Two candidates faced off in the Republican primary, Billy Hewes and Tate Reeves. Reeves, who held a statewide office, had more name recognition and raised more money for his campaign than Hewes, a member in the Mississippi legislature. Both campaigns argued over their records in public office and how much each had contributed to the state's long-term bond debt.

==== Candidates ====
- Billy Hewes, Mississippi State Senator for the 49th district
- Tate Reeves, Mississippi State Treasurer

==== Results ====
Republican primary results
Party	Candidate	Votes	%
Republican	Tate Reeves	162,857	56.8%
Republican	Billy Hewes	123,389	43.1%
Total votes		286,246	100.0

=== General election ===
==== Results ====
Mississippi lieutenant gubernatorial election, 2011
Party	Candidate	Votes	%
Republican	Tate Reeves	644,205	80.3%
Reform	Tracella Lou O'Hara Hill	157,547	19.6%
Total votes		801,752	100.0
Republican hold			

== Secretary of State ==
Mississippi Secretary of State election, 2011
- November 8, 2011
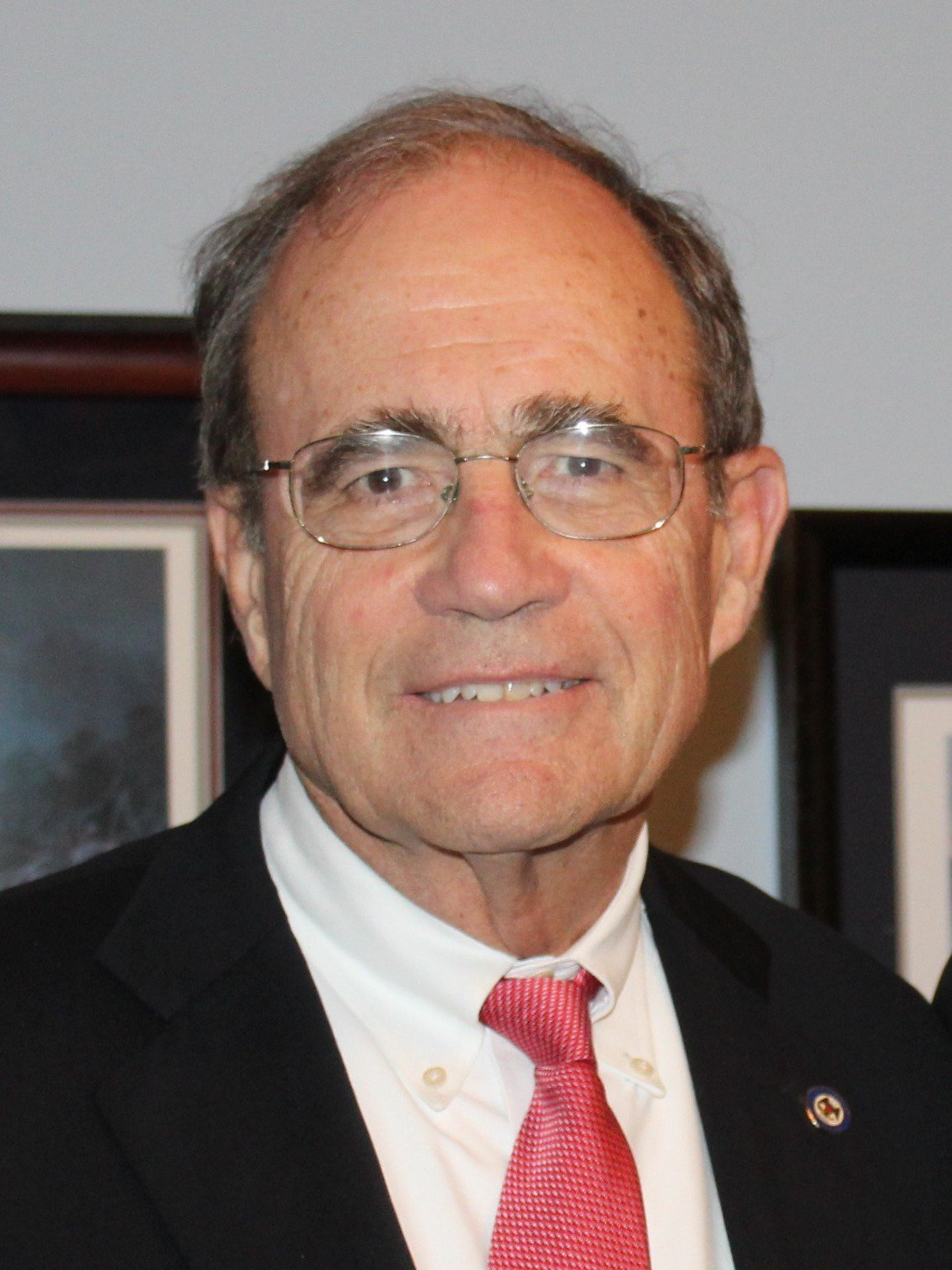
Nominee	Delbert Hosemann
Party	Republican
Electoral vote	122
Popular vote	719,734
Percentage	100%
- County results Hosemann: 90–100%
Secretary of State before election
Delbert Hosemann
Republican
Elected Secretary of State
Delbert Hosemann
Republican

Incumbent Republican Secretary of State Delbert Hosemann sought reelection and won unopposed in the general election.

=== Republican primary ===
Two candidates ran in the Republican primary, Ricky Dombrowski, a Gulfport councilman, and Delbert Hosemann, the incumbent Secretary of State. Dombrowski announced his candidacy after heated discussions with Hosemann over leasing with the Gulfport harbor. Hosemann easily defeated Dombrowski in the primary.

==== Candidates ====
- Ricky Dombrowski, Gulfport City Council President
- Delbert Hosemann, incumbent

Republican primary results
Party	Candidate	Votes	%
Republican	Delbert Hosemann	231,077	83.3%
Republican	Ricky Dombrowski	46,114	16.6%
Total votes		277,191	100.0

=== General election ===
==== Results ====
Mississippi Secretary of State election, 2011
Party	Candidate	Votes	%
Republican	Delbert Hosemann	719,734	100%
Total votes		719,734	100.0
Republican hold			

== Attorney General ==
Mississippi Attorney General election, 2011
- November 8, 2011
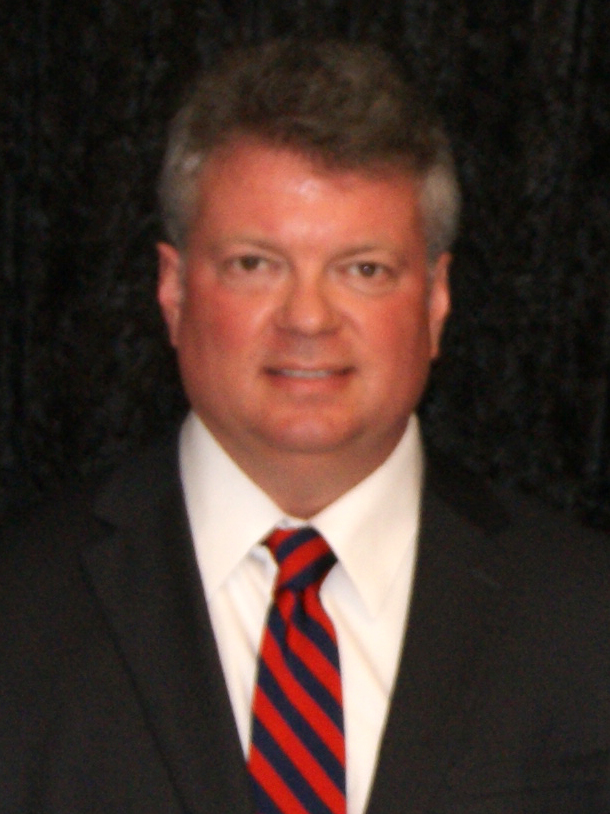

Nominee	Jim Hood	Steve Simpson
Party	Democratic	Republican
Electoral vote	98	24
Popular vote	536,827	342,086
Percentage	61.08%	38.92%
- County results Hood: 50–60% 60–70% 70–80% 80–90% Simpson: 50–60% 60–70%
Attorney General before election
Jim Hood
Democratic
Elected Attorney General
Jim Hood
Democratic

Incumbent Democratic attorney general Jim Hood decided to run for reelection. He defeated Republican candidate Steven Simpson in the general election.

=== Democratic nomination ===
==== Candidates ====
- Jim Hood, incumbent

Democratic primary results
Party	Candidate	Votes	%
Democratic	Jim Hood	325,062	100%
Total votes		325,062	100.0

=== Republican nomination ===
==== Candidates ====
- Steve Simpson, Department of Public Safety Commissioner and former circuit judge

Republican primary results
Party	Candidate	Votes	%
Republican	Steve Simpson	199,928	100%
Total votes		199,928	100.0

=== General election ===
In debates, Simpson challenged Hood on his record in regards to a suit against the Affordable Care Act, the "Personhood" amendment, and Castle Doctrine, while Hood touted his record on lowering domestic homicide, successful lawsuits, and his background. In the general election, Hood won over Simpson, continuing his service as the only Democrat statewide officeholder.

==== Results ====
Mississippi Attorney General election, 2011
Party	Candidate	Votes	%
Democratic	Jim Hood	536,827	61.08%
Republican	Steve Simpson	342,086	38.92%
Total votes		878,913	100.0
Democratic hold			

== State Auditor ==
Mississippi State Auditor election, 2011
- November 8, 2011
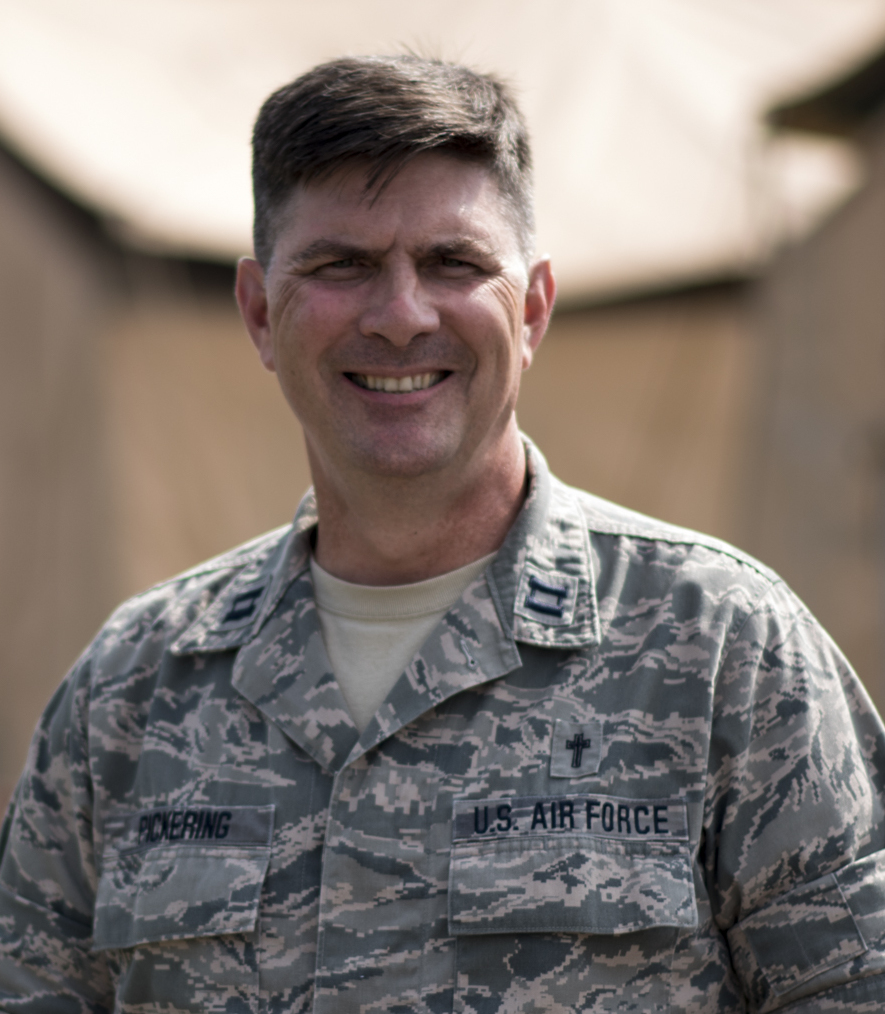

Nominee	Stacey Pickering	Ashley Norwood
Party	Republican	Reform
Electoral vote	113	9
Popular vote	596,395	192,271
Percentage	75.6%	24.3%
- County results Pickering: 50–60% 60–70% 70–80% 80–90% Norwood: 50–60%
State Auditor before election
Stacey Pickering
Republican
Elected State Auditor
Stacey Pickering
Republican

Incumbent Republican State Auditor Stacey Pickering opted to run for reelection, winning over Reform Party candidate Ashley Norwood.

=== Reform nomination ===
==== Candidates ====
- Ashley Norwood

=== Republican nomination ===
==== Candidates ====
- Stacey Pickering, incumbent

Republican primary results
Party	Candidate	Votes	%
Republican	Stacey Pickering	205,211	100%
Total votes		205,211	100.0

=== General election ===
==== Results ====
Mississippi State Auditor election, 2011
Party	Candidate	Votes	%
Republican	Stacey Pickering	596,395	75.6%
Reform	Ashley Norwood	192,271	24.3%
Total votes		788,666	100.0
Republican hold			

== State Treasurer ==
Mississippi State Treasurer election, 2011
- November 8, 2011
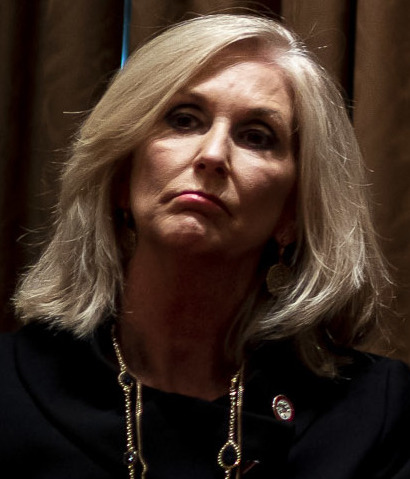

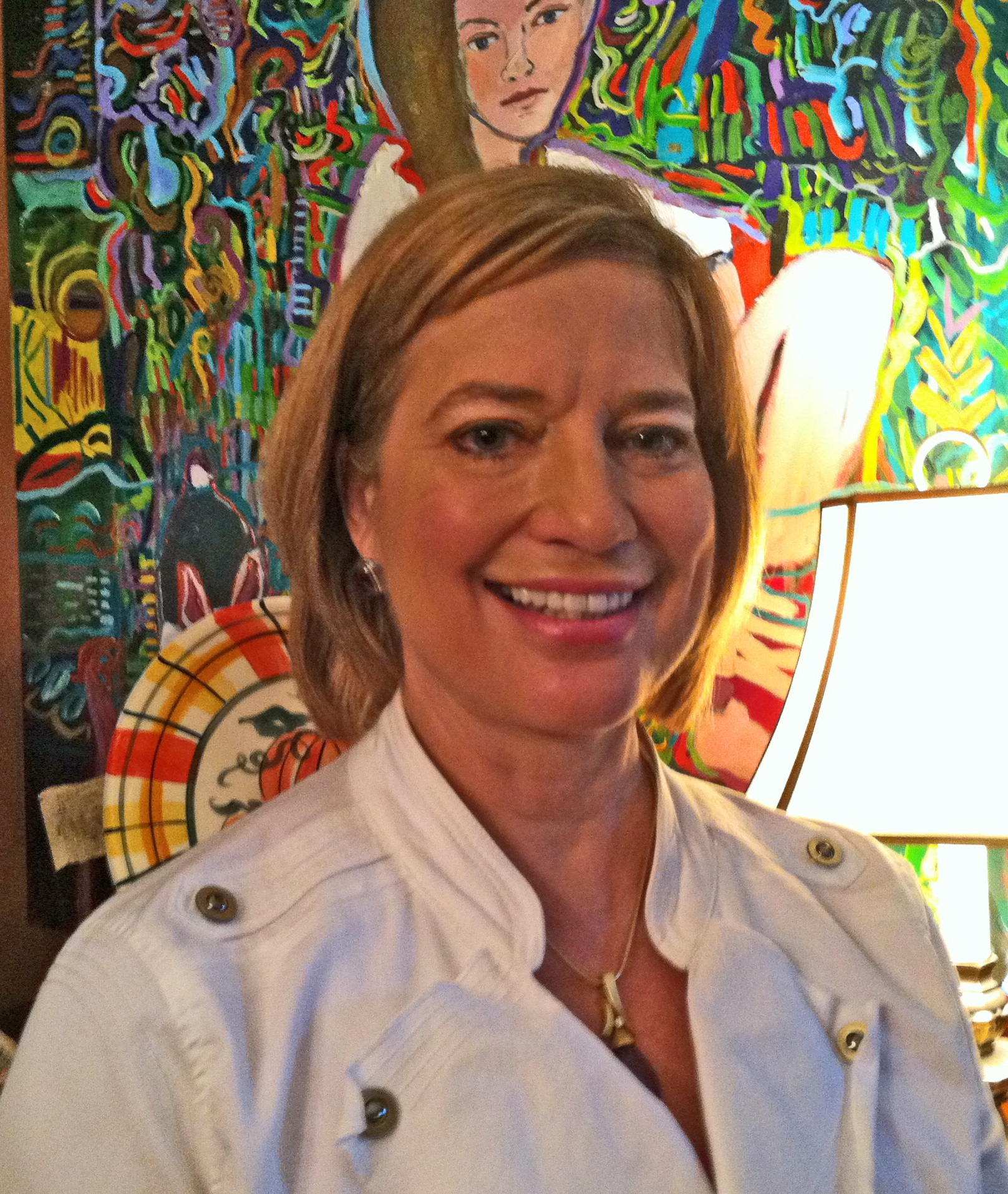
Nominee	Lynn Fitch	Connie Moran
Party	Republican	Democratic
Electoral vote	80	42
Popular vote	513,132	333,267
Percentage	58.7%	38.18%
- County results Fitch: 40-50% 50-60% 60-70% 70-80% Moran: 40-50% 50-60% 60-70% 70-80%
State Treasurer before election
Tate Reeves
Republican
Elected State Treasurer
Lynn Fitch
Republican

Incumbent Republican State Treasurer Tate Reeves did not seek reelection, instead running for the Lieutenant Governor's office. Republican candidate Lynn Fitch won in the general election over Democratic candidate Connie Moran and Reform Party candidate Shawn O'Hara.

=== Democratic nomination ===
==== Candidates ====
- Connie Moran, mayor of Ocean Springs

==== Results ====
Democratic primary results
Party	Candidate	Votes	%
Democratic	Connie Moran	283,070	100%
Total votes		283,070	100.0

=== Reform nomination ===
==== Candidates ====
- Shawn O'Hara

=== Republican primary ===
Three candidates ran in the Republican primary for Mississippi State Treasurer: Lynn Fitch, Lucien Smith, and Lee Yancey. In the primary, none received a majority of the vote, necessitating a runoff between the two candidates with the highest vote totals. Lynn Fitch and Lee Yancey advanced to the runoff, where Fitch won; she outraised Yancey by $200,000.

==== Candidates ====
- Lynn Fitch, executive director of the Mississippi State Personnel Board
- Lucien Smith, former budget advisor for Governor Haley Barbour
- Lee Yancey, Mississippi State Senator

==== Results ====
Republican primary results
Party	Candidate	Votes	%
Republican	Lynn Fitch	104,287	37.6%
Republican	Lee Yancey	92,653	33.4%
Republican	Lucien Smith	80,054	28.9%
Total votes		276,994	100.0

==== Runoff ====
Republican primary runoff results
Party	Candidate	Votes	%
Republican	Lynn Fitch	82,930	53.1%
Republican	Lee Yancey	73,076	46.8%
Total votes		156,006	100.0

=== General election ===
==== Results ====
Mississippi State Treasurer election, 2011
Party	Candidate	Votes	%
Republican	Lynn Fitch	513,132	58.7%
Democratic	Connie Moran	333,267	38.1%
Reform	Shawn O'Hara	26,421	3.0%
Total votes		872,820	100.0
Republican hold			

== Commissioner of Agriculture and Commerce ==
Mississippi Commissioner of Agriculture and Commerce election, 2011
- November 8, 2011

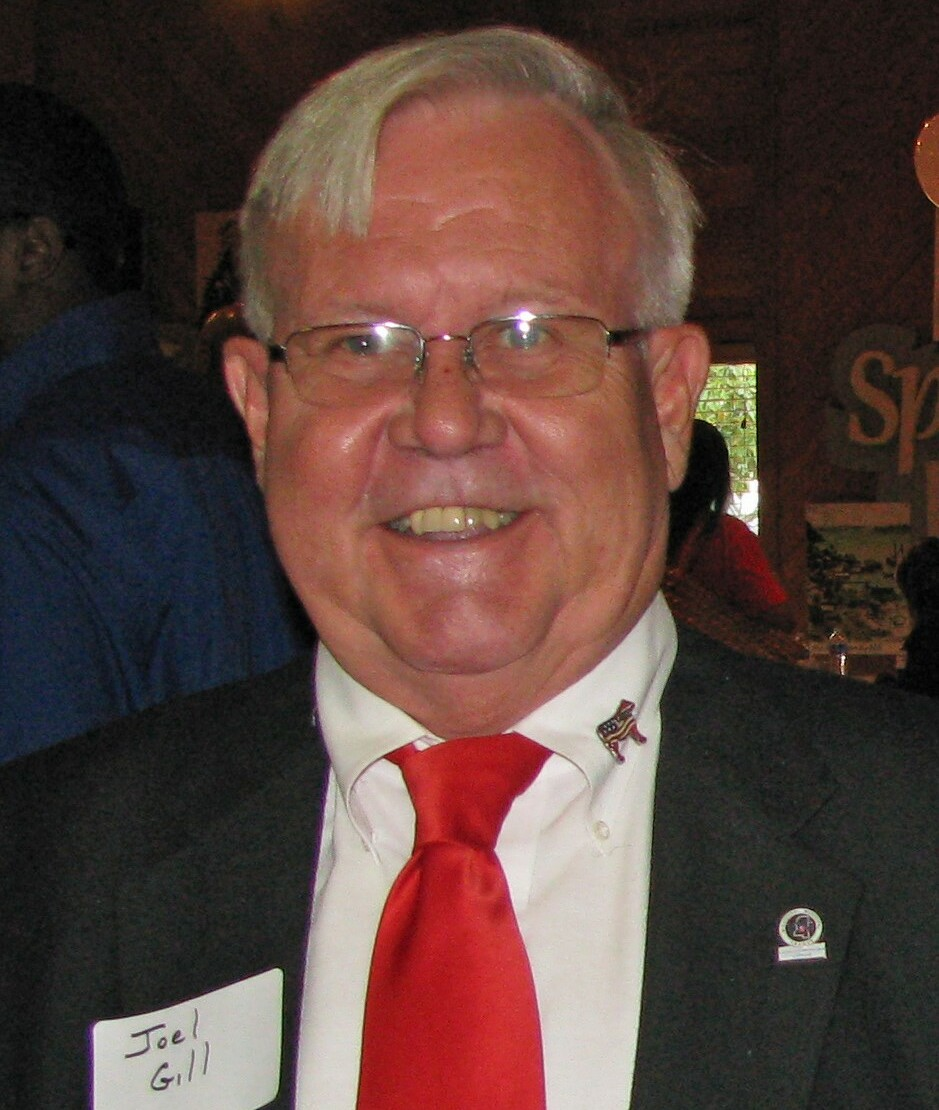
Nominee	Cindy Hyde-Smith	Joel Gill
Party	Republican	Democratic
Electoral vote	81	41
Popular vote	493,417	352,213
Percentage	56.91%	40.63%
- County results Hyde-Smith: 40-50% 50-60% 60-70% 70-80% Gill: 40-50% 50-60% 60-70% 70-80% 80-90% Tie: 40-50%
Commissioner of Agriculture and Commerce before election
Lester Spell
Republican
Elected Commissioner of Agriculture and Commerce
Cindy Hyde-Smith
Republican

Incumbent Republican Commissioner of Agriculture and Commerce Lester Spell decided not to run for reelection. Republican candidate Cindy Hyde-Smith won in the general election over Democratic candidate Joel Gill and Reform Party candidate Cathy L. Toole.

=== Democratic nomination ===
==== Candidates ====
- Joe Gill, Mayor of Pickens

==== Results ====
Democratic primary results
Party	Candidate	Votes	%
Democratic	Joe Gill	298,155	100%
Total votes		298,155	100.0

=== Reform nomination ===
==== Candidates ====
- Cathy L. Toole

=== Republican primary ===
==== Candidates ====
- Cindy Hyde-Smith, Mississippi State Senator
- Max Phillips, retired agriculture educator
- Dannie Reed, Mississippi State House Representative

==== Results ====
Republican primary results
Party	Candidate	Votes	%
Republican	Cindy Hyde-Smith	144,873	52.9%
Republican	Max Phillip	96,049	35.0%
Republican	Dannie Reed	32,809	11.9%
Total votes		273,731	100.0

=== General election ===
==== Results ====
Mississippi Commissioner of Agriculture and Commerce election, 2011
Party	Candidate	Votes	%
Republican	Cindy Hyde-Smith	493,417	56.9%
Democratic	Joel Gill	352,213	40.6%
Reform	Cathy L. Toole	21,347	2.4%
Total votes		866,977	100.0
Republican hold			

== Commissioner of Insurance ==
Mississippi Commissioner of Insurance election, 2011
- November 8, 2011
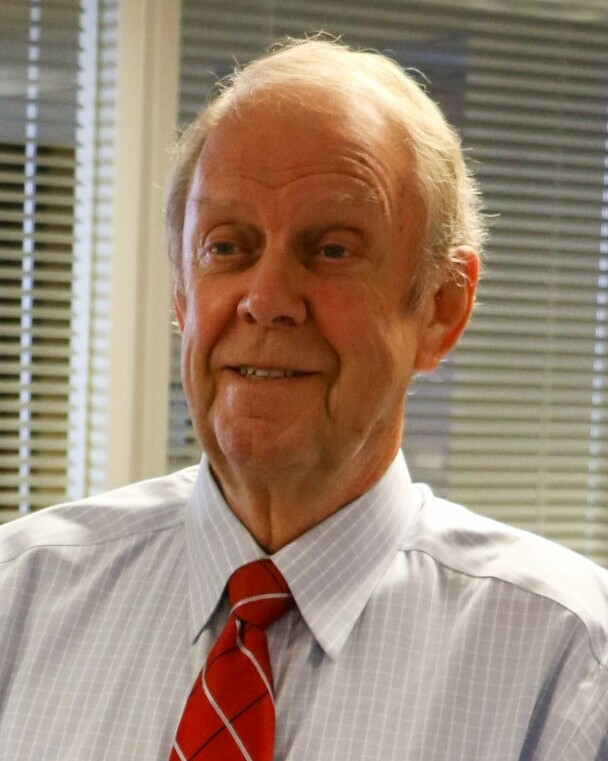

Nominee	Mike Chaney	Louis Fondren
Party	Republican	Democratic
Electoral vote	83	39
Popular vote	538,008	301,185
Percentage	61.9%	34.6%
- County results Chaney: 40-50% 50-60% 60-70% 70-80% 80-90% Fondren: 40-50% 50-60% 60-70% 70-80%
Commissioner of Insurance before election
Mike Chaney
Republican
Elected Commissioner of Insurance
Mike Chaney
Republican

Incumbent Republican Commissioner of Insurance Mike Chaney ran for reelection, winning over Democratic candidate Louis Fondren and Reform Party candidate Barbara Dale Washer.

=== Democratic nomination ===
==== Candidates ====
- Louis Fondren, former Mayor of Moss Point

==== Results ====
Democratic primary results
Party	Candidate	Votes	%
Democratic	Louis Fondren	293,754	100%
Total votes		293,754	100.0

=== Reform nomination ===
==== Candidates ====
- Barbara Dale Washer

=== Republican nomination ===
==== Candidates ====
- Mike Chaney

==== Results ====
Republican primary results
Party	Candidate	Votes	%
Republican	Mike Chaney	202,201	100%
Total votes		202,201	100.0

=== General election ===
==== Results ====
Mississippi Commissioner of Insurance election, 2011
Party	Candidate	Votes	%
Republican	Mike Chaney	538,008	61.9%
Democratic	Louis Fondren	301,185	34.6%
Reform	Barbara Dale Washer	29,200	3.3%
Total votes		863,393	100.0
Republican hold			

== Public Service Commission ==
Mississippi Public Service Commissioner, Northern District election, 2011
- November 8, 2011
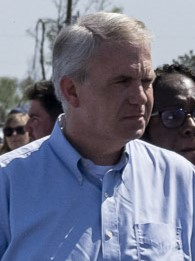

Nominee	Brandon Presley	Boyce Adams
Party	Democratic	Republican
Popular vote	161,099	127,557
Percentage	55.81%	44.19%
- County results Presley: 50-60% 60-70% 70-80% Adams: 50-60% 70-80%
Northern District Commissioner before election
Brandon Presley
Democratic
Elected Northern District Commissioner
Brandon Presley
Democratic

=== Northern district ===
Incumbent Democratic Commissioner Brandon Presley ran for reelection, winning against Republican candidate Boyce Adams.

==== Democratic nomination ====
===== Candidates =====
- Brandon Presley, incumbent

===== Results =====
Democratic primary results
Party	Candidate	Votes	%
Democratic	Brandon Presley	110,693	100%
Total votes		110,693	100.0

==== Republican primary ====
===== Candidates =====
- Boyce Adams
- Marvin Cox

===== Results =====
Republican primary results
Party	Candidate	Votes	%
Republican	Boyce Adams	36,884	65.5%
Republican	Marvin Cox	19,385	34.4%
Total votes		56,269	100.0

==== General election ====
===== Results =====
Mississippi Public Service Commission, Northern District election, 2011
Party	Candidate	Votes	%
Democratic	Brandon Presley	161,099	55.81%
Republican	Boyce Adams	127,557	44.19%
Total votes		288,656	100.0
Democratic hold			

Mississippi Public Service Commissioner, Central District election, 2011
- November 8, 2011

Nominee	Lynn Posey	Addie Green
Party	Republican	Democratic
Popular vote	157,675	121,653
Percentage	56.45%	43.55%
- County results Posey: 50-60% 60-70% 70-80% 80-90% Green: 50-60% 60-70% 70-80%
Central District Commissioner before election
Lynn Posey
Republican
Elected Central District Commissioner
Lynn Posey
Republican

=== Central district ===
Incumbent Republican Commissioner Lynn Posey ran for reelection, winning against Democratic candidate Addie Green.

==== Democratic primary ====
===== Candidates =====
- Addie Green
- Bruce Burton

===== Results =====
Democratic primary results
Party	Candidate	Votes	%
Democratic	Addie Green	55,946	51.9%
Democratic	Bruce Burton	51,836	48.0%
Total votes		107,782	100.0

==== Republican nomination ====
===== Candidate =====
- Lynn Posey

===== Results =====
Republican primary results
Party	Candidate	Votes	%
Republican	Lynn Posey	42,825	100%
Total votes		42,825	100.0

==== General election ====
===== Results =====
Mississippi Public Service Commissioner, Central District election, 2011
Party	Candidate	Votes	%
Republican	Lynn Posey	157,675	56.45%
Democratic	Addie Green	121,653	43.55%
Total votes		279,328	100.0
Republican hold			

Mississippi Public Service Commissioner, Southern District election, 2011
- November 8, 2011

Nominee	Leonard Bentz	Mike Collier
Party	Republican	Democratic
Popular vote	178,804	118,813
Percentage	60.08%	39.92%
- County results Bentz: 50-60% 60-70% 70-80% Collier: 50-60% 60-70%
Southern District Commissioner before election
Leonard Bentz
Republican
Elected Southern District Commissioner
Leonard Bentz
Republican

=== Southern district ===
Incumbent Republican Commissioner Leonard Bentz ran for reelection, winning against Democratic candidate Mike Collier.

==== Democratic primary ====
===== Candidates =====
- Thomas "Tom" Blanton
- James M. Buckhaults
- Mike Collier

===== Results =====
Democratic primary results
Party	Candidate	Votes	%
Democratic	Mike Collier	39,440	38.4%
Democratic	Thomas Blanton	34,659	33.8%
Democratic	James Buckhaults	28,425	27.7%
Total votes		102,524	100.0

==== Republican primary ====
===== Candidates =====
- Leonard Bentz
- Travis Rose

===== Results =====
Republican primary results
Party	Candidate	Votes	%
Republican	Leonard Bentz	94,253	65.0%
Republican	Travis Rose	50,641	34.9%
Total votes		144,894	100.0

==== General election ====
===== Results =====
Mississippi Public Service Commissioner, Southern District election, 2011
Party	Candidate	Votes	%
Republican	Leonard Bentz	178,804	60.08%
Democratic	Mike Collier	118,813	39.92%
Total votes		297,617	100.0
Republican hold			

== Transportation Commission ==
Mississippi Transportation Commissioner, Northern District election, 2011
- November 8, 2011
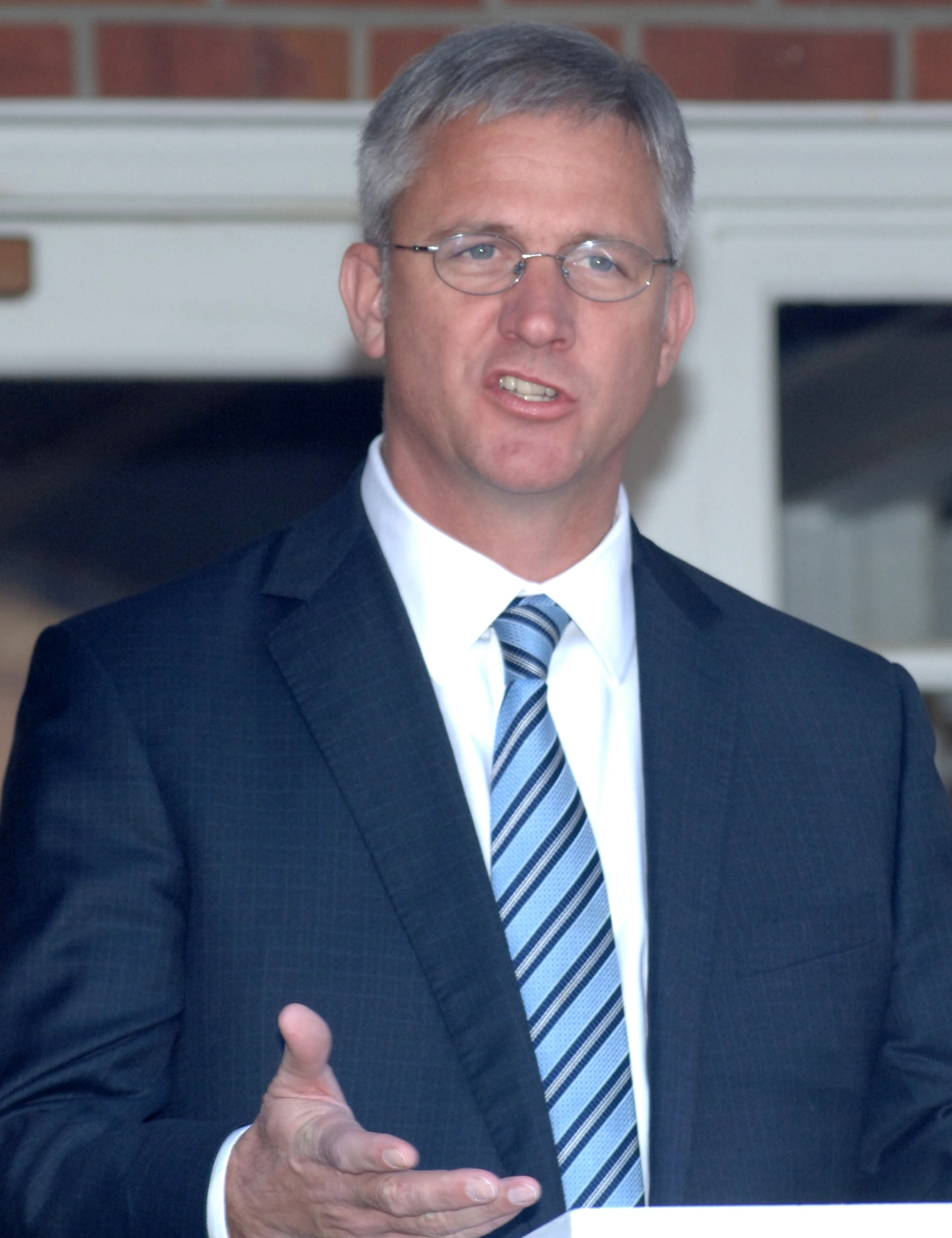

Nominee	Mike Tagert	Ray Minor
Party	Republican	Democratic
Popular vote	169,317	117,934
Percentage	58.94%	41.06%
- County results Tagert: 50-60% 60-70% 70-80% Minor: 50-60% 60-70% 70-80%
Northern District Commissioner before election
Bill Minor
Democratic
Elected Northern District Commissioner
Mike Tagert
Republican

=== Northern district ===
Incumbent Democratic Commissioner Bill Minor died on November 1, 2010, leading to seven candidates to seek his replacement. Republican candidates John Caldwell Sr. and Mike Tagert received the most votes in the special election, but since neither received a majority, a runoff was scheduled for February 1. Mike Tagert won in the runoff.

Come the November elections for a full-term, Tagert faced off against Democrat Ray Minor. Tagert won in the general election.

==== Democratic nomination ====
===== Candidate =====
- Ray Minor

==== Republican nomination ====
===== Candidates =====
- Mike Tagert

==== General election ====
===== Results =====
Mississippi Transportation Commissioner, Northern District election, 2011
Party	Candidate	Votes	%
Republican	Mike Tagert	169,317	58.94%
Democratic	Ray Minor	117,934	41.06%
Total votes		287,251	100.0
Republican gain from Democratic			

Mississippi Transportation Commissioner, Central District election, 2011
- November 8, 2011
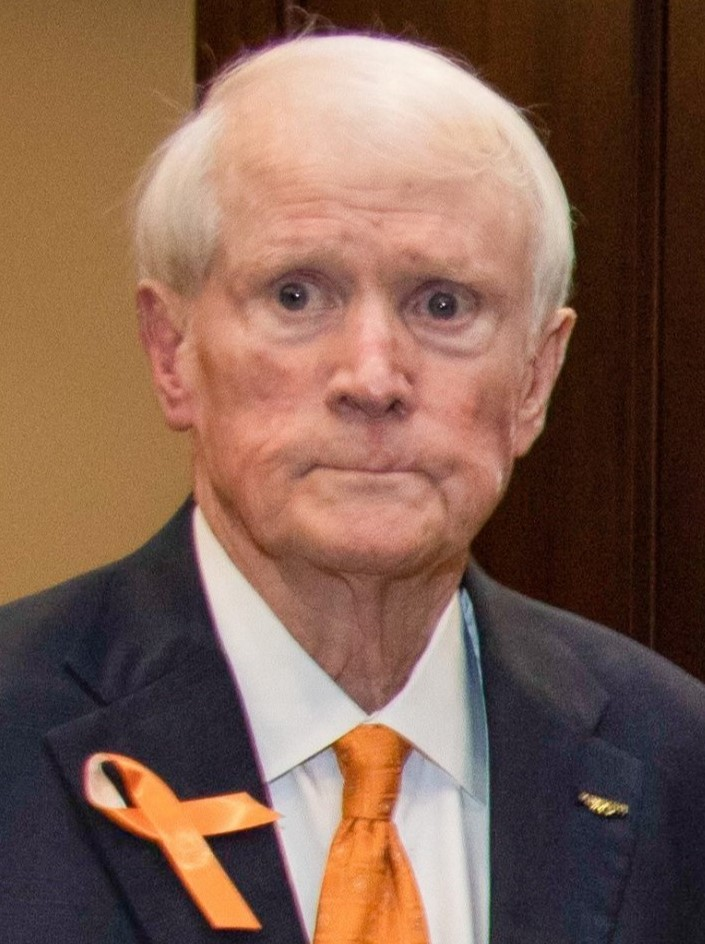

Nominee	Dick Hall	Marshand Crisler
Party	Republican	Democratic
Popular vote	148,470	133,352
Percentage	52.68%	47.32%
- County results Hall: 50-60% 60-70% 70-80% Crisler: 50-60% 60-70% 70-80% 80-90%
Central District Commissioner before election
Dick Hall
Republican
Elected Central District Commissioner
Dick Hall
Republican

=== Central district ===
Incumbent Republican Commissioner Dick Hall ran for reelection, winning against Democratic candidate Marshand Crisler.

==== Democratic primary ====
===== Candidates =====
- Dorothy Benford
- Marshand Crisler

===== Results =====
Democratic primary results
Party	Candidate	Votes	%
Democratic	Marshand Crisler	60,255	53.96%
Democratic	Dorothy Benford	51,402	46.03%
Total votes		111,657	100.0

==== Republican primary ====
===== Candidates =====
- Dick Hall, incumbent
- Tim Johnson

===== Results =====
Republican primary results
Party	Candidate	Votes	%
Republican	Dick Hall	66,879	71.33%
Republican	Tim Johnson	26,869	28.66%
Total votes		93,748	100.0

==== General election ====
===== Results =====
Mississippi Transportation Commissioner, Central District election, 2011
Party	Candidate	Votes	%
Republican	Dick Hall	148,470	52.68%
Democratic	Marshand Crisler	133,352	47.32%
Total votes		281,822	100.0
Republican hold			

Mississippi Transportation Commissioner, Southern District election, 2011
- November 8, 2011
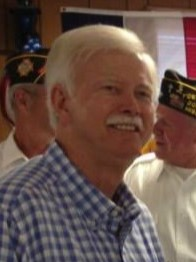

Nominee	Tom King	Larry L. Albritton
Party	Republican	Democratic
Popular vote	179,361	119,414
Percentage	60.03%	39.97%
- County results King: 50-60% 60-70% 70-80% 80-90% Albritton: 50-60% 60-70%
Southern District Commissioner before election
Wayne Brown
Democratic
Elected Southern District Commissioner
Tom King
Republican

=== Southern district ===
Incumbent Democratic Commissioner Wayne Brown did not seek reelection. Republican candidate Tom King won over Democratic candidate Larry L. Albritton in the general election.

==== Democratic nomination ====
===== Candidate =====
- Larry L. Albritton

==== Republican primary ====
===== Candidates =====
- Scottie R. Cuevas
- Tom King

===== Results =====
Republican primary results
Party	Candidate	Votes	%
Republican	Tom King	79,605	66.69%
Republican	Scottie R. Cuevas	39,753	33.30%
Total votes		119,358	100.0

==== General election ====
===== Results =====
Mississippi Transportation Commissioner, Northern District election, 2011
Party	Candidate	Votes	%
Republican	Tom King	179,361	60.03%
Democratic	Larry L. Albritton	119,414	39.97%
Total votes		298,775	100.0
Republican gain from Democratic			
