= Jarvis Dortch =

American politician

Member of the Mississippi House of Representatives from the 66th district
- In office January 5, 2016 – July 2, 2020
- Preceded by: Cecil Brown
- Succeeded by: De'Keither Stamps

Personal details
- Born: February 5, 1981 (age 45) Jackson, Mississippi
- Party: Democratic

Jarvis Dortch (born February 5, 1981) is an American politician who served in the Mississippi House of Representatives from the 66th district from 2016 to mid-2020 and currently serves as the Executive Director of the American Civil Liberties Union of Mississippi. The ACLU of Mississippi is the autonomously-run Mississippi state affiliate of the national American Civil Liberties Union.
