= Bill Johnson (Mississippi politician) =

American politician

Member of the Mississippi State Senate from the 46th district
- In office January 5, 1993 – January 2, 1996
- Preceded by: Vic Franckiewicz Jr.
- Succeeded by: Scottie Cuevas

Personal details
- Born: William Alphonse Johnson Jr. 1954 or 1955 (age 71–72)
- Party: Democratic (until 1992); Republican (since 1992)

William Alphonse Johnson Jr. (born 1954 or 1955) is an American former politician.

He attended Pearl River Community College and Mississippi Gulf Coast Community College. In 1991, he ran in the Democratic Party primary for the 46th district seat in the Mississippi State Senate but lost to Vic Franckiewicz Jr. The next year, after a federal court panel mandated new redistricting and elections for the entire legislature, he ran for the same seat as a Republican, besting Democratic nominee Scottie Cuevas and independent Jerry Ladner. Johnson was defeated in a rematch with Cuevas in 1995.
