= Tom King (Mississippi politician) =

American politician

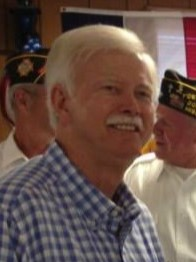

Member of the Mississippi Transportation Commission from the Southern District
- In office January 3, 2012 – January 4, 2024
- Preceded by: Wayne Brown
- Succeeded by: Charles Busby

Member of the Mississippi State Senate from the 44th district
- In office January 4, 2000 – January 3, 2012
- Preceded by: Jim Bean
- Succeeded by: John A. Polk

Member of the Mississippi House of Representatives from the 104th district
- In office January 5, 1993 – January 4, 2000
- Preceded by: Bill Jones
- Succeeded by: Mike Lott

Personal details
- Born: Thomas Edward King, Jr. July 19, 1947 (age 79) Hattiesburg, Mississippi, U.S.
- Party: Republican
- Spouse: Susan Lynn Patterson
- Education: University of Southern Mississippi (BS)

Military service
- Allegiance: United States
- Branch/service: United States Air Force
- Unit: Security Police
- Battles/wars: Vietnam War

Thomas Edward King, Jr. (born July 19, 1947) is an American politician. A Republican, he served for nearly two decades in the Mississippi Legislature before successfully running for the Southern District seat on the Mississippi Transportation Commission in 2011. He retired from the position in 2023.

== Early life and education ==
King was born in Hattiesburg, Mississippi and graduated from Petal High School. He graduate with a Bachelor's degree from the University of Southern Mississippi. He is a veteran from the Vietnam War serving in the United States Air Force as an Air Policeman.

== Career ==
He was the business owner of a historical restoration consulting and contracting business.

A Republican, King was elected to the Mississippi House of Representatives in 1993 for the 104th district before being elected to the Mississippi State Senate for the 44th district in 2000. In the senate, he served as the chairman of the Senate Highways and Transportation Committee. During his time as senator, he authored a bill that supplied a $300 million bond for highways and bridges; a bill that promoted cyclist safety; and a bill that created the Mississippi Wireless Communications Commission.

In the 2011 Mississippi elections, he ran for the Mississippi Transportation Commission for the Southern District. He ran against former state senator Scottie Cuevas. He won with 67% of the vote, and went on to defeat Democrat contender Larry Albritton in the general election, with over 60% of the vote. In 2015, he was uncontested in the primary and won the general election with over 67% percent of the vote. In 2019, he won the Republican primary and won the general election unopposed.

In November 2022, he declared that he would not seek reelection to the Transportation Commission.

== Personal life ==
He lives in Hattiesburg, Mississippi and is married to Susan Lynn Patterson. He has two children.

He is affiliated with the Chamber of Commerce, Rotary Club, American Legion and VFW.
