= Vic Franckiewicz Jr. =

American politician

Member of the Mississippi State Senate from the 46th district
- In office November 29, 1989 – January 5, 1993
- Preceded by: Gene Taylor
- Succeeded by: Bill Johnson

Mayor of Bay St. Louis, Mississippi
- In office July 1, 1985 – July 1, 1989
- Preceded by: Larry Bennett
- Succeeded by: Eddie Favre

Personal details
- Born: 1954 or 1955 (age 71–72)
- Party: Democratic
- Spouse: Cheryl Bencaz (m. 1992)
- Education: Massachusetts Institute of Technology (BS, MCP); Loyola University (JD)
- Occupation: Lawyer; urban planner

Victor John Franckiewicz Jr. (born 1954 or 1955) is an American lawyer and former politician. He studied urban planning at the Massachusetts Institute of Technology, receiving Bachelor of Science and MCP degrees. After serving as mayor of Bay St. Louis, Mississippi from 1985 to 1989, he succeeded Gene Taylor in the Mississippi State Senate when Taylor won a special election to the U.S. House of Representatives. Though elected to a full term in 1991, Franckiewicz chose not to run the following year, after a federal court panel mandated new redistricting and elections for the entire state legislature. Franckiewicz graduated from Loyola University New Orleans College of Law in 1993 and pursued a legal career thereafter. He eventually moving to Louisiana with his wife, Cheryl Bencaz, who he married in 1992.
