= Jim Bean =

American businessman and politician

Member of the Mississippi State Senate from the 44th district
- In office June 1986 – January 4, 2000
- Preceded by: David M. Smith
- Succeeded by: Tom King

Personal details
- Born: James Lesley Bean, Jr. December 15, 1932 Clanton, Alabama, U.S.
- Died: July 7, 2013 (aged 80) Hattiesburg, Mississippi, U.S.
- Party: Republican
- Spouse: Peggy Johnson

Military service
- Allegiance: United States
- Branch/service: United States Air Force
- Battles/wars: Korean War

James Lesley Bean, Jr. (December 15, 1932 – July 7, 2013) was an American businessman and politician. First winning a special election to succeed the outgoing David M. Smith in the Mississippi State Senate, he held the seat until he retired in 2000.
