= Dane Maxwell =

Mississippi politician

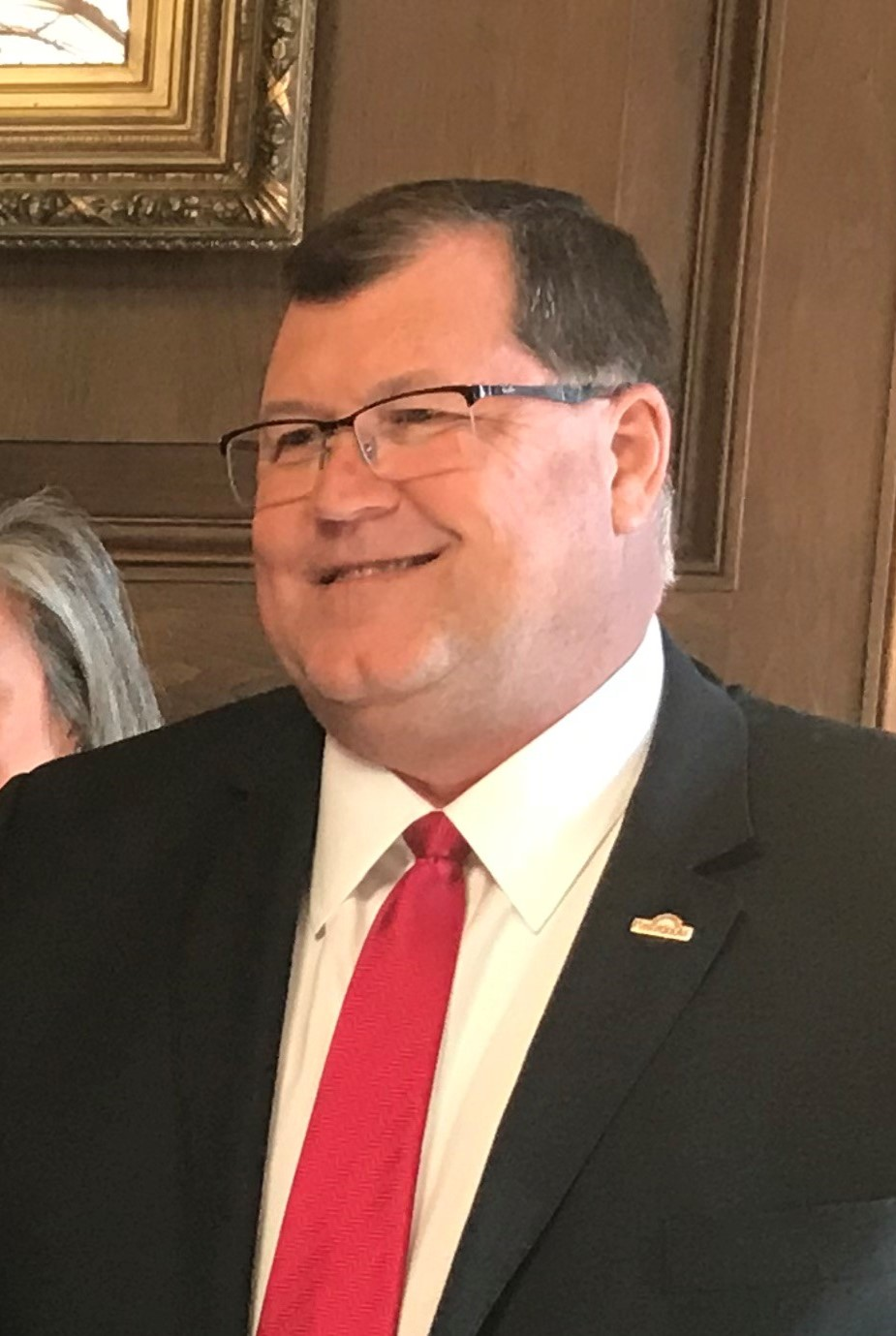

Member of the Mississippi Public Service Commission from the Southern district
- In office January 2, 2020 – January 4, 2024
- Preceded by: Sam Britton
- Succeeded by: Nelson Wayne Carr

Personal details
- Born: Dane Maxwell Pascagoula, Mississippi
- Party: Republican
- Occupation: Businessman

Dane Maxwell is an American businessman and Mississippi politician, serving on the Mississippi Public Service Commission from 2020 to 2024. Prior to that, he was the Mayor of Pascagoula, Mississippi.

== Biography ==
Maxwell was born in Pascagoula, Mississippi.

Maxwell served in the United States Marine Corps and is a retired law enforcement officer. He is an entrepreneur of two national businesses.

He was elected as the mayor of Pascagoula, Mississippi in 2016. He ran for the Southern District seat for the Mississippi Public Service Commission in 2019 as a Republican, defeating Democrat Connie Moran, the former mayor of Ocean Springs, Mississippi. He won 63% to 37%. He resigned his position as mayor to become commissioner in 2020. He was elected chairman of the commission. During the campaign, he promised to listen to customer complaints and tackle robocalls. He ran for reelection in 2023, losing to primary opponent Nelson Wayne Carr. His opponent Carr alleged that Maxwell had violated campaign finance law during the election. After an investigation by the Mississippi Ethics Commission, the Mississippi Secretary or States office and the Attorney General’s office, the accusations were found to be false and Maxwell was found to have been in compliance of all election laws. .

Maxwell started working for President Donald J. Trump in September 2015. He served as Mississippi State Director, SEC Strike Team Leader, South East regional Political Director and continued to serve the campaign in helping President Trump get elected as the 47th President in 2025.

He was a delegate to the 2016 Republican National Convention from Mississippi.

Maxwell was appointed May 5, 2025 by President Donald J. Trump to serve as the Mississippi State Director of the USDA, Rural Development.

Dane Maxwell and his father Robbie Maxwell (deceased 2015) are the first father/son to serve as Pascagoula Mayors and the first citizens of Pascagoula, MS to be appointed by a US President to serve in their term(s), (Robbie Maxwell-Bush and Dane Maxwell-Trump).

He is married to his wife Donna, has three children and resides in Pascagoula.
