= Brandon Jones (politician) =

American politician

Member of the Mississippi House of Representatives from the 111th district
- In office 2008–2012
- Succeeded by: Charles Busby

Personal details
- Born: August 23, 1977 (age 48) Pascagoula, Mississippi, U.S.
- Party: Democratic
- Spouse: Laurie Jones
- Children: 1
- Education: Mississippi College (BA); Wake Forest University (MDiv); Mercer University (JD)

Brandon C. Jones (born August 23, 1977) is an American attorney and politician who served as a member of the Mississippi House of Representatives for the 111th district from 2008 to 2012. He was a Democrat.

== Early life and education ==
Jones was born in Pascagoula, Mississippi. He earned a Bachelor of Arts degree from Mississippi College, a Master of Divinity from Wake Forest University, and a Juris Doctor from the Mercer University School of Law.

== Career ==
Jones was elected to the Mississippi House of Representatives in 2008 and served until 2012. Jones was defeated for re-election by Charles Busby. From 2014 to 2021, Jones was an attorney at Baria-Jones, PLLC in Bay St. Louis, Mississippi. He joined the Southern Poverty Law Center in 2019 as Mississippi director and has worked as the organization's director of political campaigns since October 2021.
