= John A. Polk =

American businessman and politician (1949–2026)

Member of the Mississippi State Senate from the 44th district
- In office January 3, 2012 – January 6, 2026
- Preceded by: Tom King
- Succeeded by: Chris Johnson

Personal details
- Born: John Allen Polk; March 18, 1949 Columbia, Mississippi, U.S.
- Died: July 20, 2026 (aged 77)
- Party: Republican
- Spouse: Jan Barnett
- Education: University of Southern Mississippi
- Occupation: Businessman, politician

John Allen Polk (March 18, 1949 – July 20, 2026) was an American businessman and politician. A member of the Republican Party, he served as the Mississippi State Senator from the 44th district from 2012 until 2026. He retired following court-ordered redistricting.

== Early life ==
John A. Polk was born in Columbia, Mississippi on March 18, 1949. He was educated at the Prentiss High School in Prentiss, Mississippi. He graduated from the University of Southern Mississippi in 1974.

== Career ==
Polk was an executive at Polk Meat Products, his family meat business. From 2012, he served as a Republican member of the Mississippi State Senate, representing District 44. In 2015, he proposed a bill for the repeal of annual vehicle inspections, arguing that cars are less dangerous now than they were when car stickers were introduced.

He was honored as one of the 2011 Alumni of the Year by the College of Business at his alma mater, the University of Southern Mississippi.

== Personal life and death ==
Polk was married to Jan Barnett. They had a son, Brian Polk and a daughter, Julie Polk Breazeale. They resided in Hattiesburg, Mississippi. He was a Baptist. Polk died on July 20, 2026, at the age of 77.
