= Nelson Wayne Carr =

Mississippi politician

Wayne Carr

Member of the Mississippi Public Service Commission from the Southern district
- Incumbent
- Assumed office January 4, 2024
- Governor: Tate Reeves
- Preceded by: Dane Maxwell

Personal details
- Born: Nelson Wayne Carr; 1958 or 1959 (age 66–67) Gulfport, Mississippi, U.S.
- Party: Republican

Nelson Wayne Carr (born 1958 or 1959) is an American businessman and Mississippi politician who has served on the Mississippi Public Service Commission for the Southern District since 2024 after defeating incumbent Dane Maxwell in the primary. Prior to his role on the commission, he served in the contracting and development business as an electrician.

== Biography ==
Carr was born in either 1958 or 1959 and raised in Gulfport, Mississippi. His father was a heavy equipment operator for the Gulfport street department and would help his dad plant crops in the family garden.

He graduated from Gulfport High School in 1977 and entered the construction industry as an electrical apprentice. He was later licensed by the Mississippi Board of Contractors Electrical and Builders Licenses and has worked as a building contracting agent.

=== Public Service Commission ===
Carr ran in the 2023 Mississippi elections in the Republican primary for the Mississippi Public Service Commission for the Southern District. He ran against incumbent and former mayor of Pascagoula Dane Maxwell, who he alleged had violated campaign finance law for improperly reporting campaign donations. He expressed support for diversifying fuel sources and protecting against supply shortages and price spikes on his campaign website.

In the election, he voiced support for scrutinizing rate cases and taking a closer look at out-of-state companies. He encouraged more solar companies in Mississippi "to promote competition" and supported net metering. He critiqued excessive federal regulations from the EPA on coal and disputed the need for a consumer advocate watchdog. He supported the idea of modular nuclear power units for grid stability.

He won the primary 52% to 47%. He ran uncontested in the general election.
