= John Caldwell (Mississippi politician) =

Mississippi politician

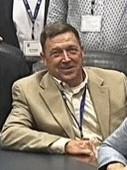

Member of the Mississippi Transportation Commission from the Northern district
- Incumbent
- Assumed office January 7, 2020
- Governor: Tate Reeves
- Preceded by: Mike Tagert

Personal details
- Born: Near Nesbit, Mississippi, U.S.
- Party: Republican
- Education: Arkansas State University (BS); Columbia Southern University (MBA)

John Caldwell is a Mississippi politician serving on the Mississippi Transportation Commission for the Northern District since 2020. A Republican, he previously worked as a transportation director for the largest school district in Mississippi and later served as DeSoto County supervisor. He ran for election to the Mississippi Transportation Commission in 2011 but lost. He ran again and won in 2019.

== Early life and education ==
Caldwell was born near Nesbit, Mississippi to Elizabeth and Joe Caldwell. He graduated with a Bachelor of Science from Arkansas State University and an MBA in Public Administration from Columbia Southern University.

A second generation U.S. Marine, he served in Desert Storm and Iraqi Freedom. He retired as a colonel from the with a Bronze Star, a Legion of Merit, and other awards.

== Career ==
He is a small business owner in Southaven, Mississippi. He was the transportation director for the largest school district in Mississippi, located in DeSoto County. He worked in the transportation industry after his job in the school district. He works as a volunteer firefighter.

He served as DeSoto County supervisor from 1996 to 2003, becoming the first Republican to ever sit on the board. In 2011, he ran for the Mississippi Transportation Commission for the Northern District during a special election upon the death of commissioner Bill Minor. During the campaign, he embraced his Republican affiliation and called for a new Mississippi Department of Transportation executive director. He lost the race to Mike Tagert after a runoff.

He again for the Transportation Commission in 2019, defeating Geoffrey Yoste 56% to 43%. He won 63% to 38% in the general election against Joe Grist. He won reelection in 2023 uncontested. As commissioner, he postposed $100 million in emergency road and bridge money for cities and counties.

== Personal life ==
He is married to Lee Perkins Caldwell since 1982, DeSoto County supervisor, and has four children.
