= Willie Lee Simmons =

American politician

Willie Simmons
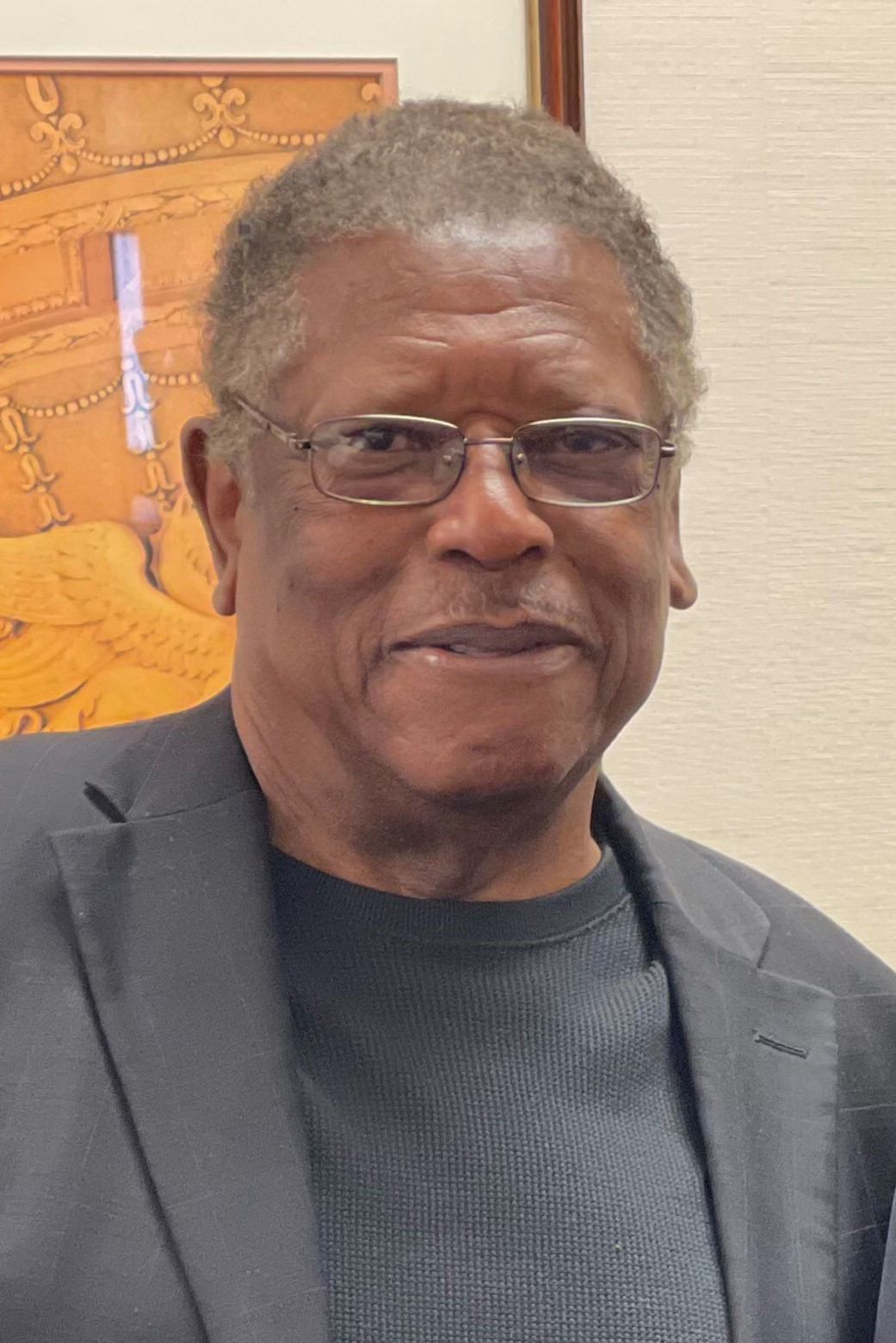

Member of the Mississippi Transportation Commission from the Central district
- Incumbent
- Assumed office January 7, 2020
- Governor: Tate Reeves
- Preceded by: Dick Hall

Member of the Mississippi Senate from the 13th district
- In office January 5, 1993 – January 7, 2020
- Preceded by: Robert Crook
- Succeeded by: Sarita Simmons

Personal details
- Born: Willie Lee Simmons; March 21, 1947 (age 79) Utica, Mississippi, U.S.
- Party: Democratic
- Spouse: Rosie Sibley
- Children: Sarita
- Education: Utica Junior College (attended); Alcorn State University (BS); Delta State University (EdS, MS)

Willie Lee Simmons (born March 21, 1947) is an American politician and former member of the Mississippi State Senate from the 13th District, where he served from 1993 to 2020. Simmons ran and won the election to the Mississippi Transportation Commission for the Central District. Prior to serving in the senate, he worked in the Mississippi Department of Corrections.

He is a member of the Democratic Party. His daughter is Sarita Simmons, Senator for Mississippi's 13th district.

== Early life and education ==
Simmons was born on March 21, 1947 in Utica, Mississippi and went to Utica Junior College. He graduated from Alcorn State University in 1967 with a bachelor's in social science; and received Master of Science Degree in guidance and counseling and Education Specialist Degree in counseling and administration from Delta State University. He served in the U.S. Army during the Vietnam War.

== Career ==
Simmons worked as Deputy Commissioner for the Mississippi Department of Corrections. He founded a pre-release program for inmates at the Mississippi State Penitentiary in 1975. The Mississippi Senate considered naming the program's building at the facility after Simmons. Simmons also worked as a visiting professor for Delta State University and the U.S. Post Office.

A Democrat, he ran for the Mississippi State Senate against Senator Robert Crook in 1992 who was running for re-election to the newly re-apportioned 13th district, which represented Sunflower and Bolivar Counties. Simmons won 54% to 46%, which was considered an upset, as Crook was the most senior member of the legislature. Simmons served in the Senate for 26 years, of which 8 years he served as chairman of the Senate Transportation Committee. In the senate, he played a role in the repair of the Woodrow Wilson Bridge, the upgrade and repair of Highway 8 in Cleveland, Mississippi, and the Highway 82 Bypass in Leland, Mississippi. During his leadership, he appropriated $5 billion in highway and other infrastructure improvements.

In mid-January 2019, Simmons announced a run for the Mississippi Transportation Commission for the Central District after Dick Hall announced his retirement. He won the election against Republic Mayor Butch Lee 51.1% to 48.9% and was sworn into office in January. He won reelection in 2023 against Republican Ricky Pennington 55.2% to 44.8% and was named chairman of the commission in 2024.

== Personal life ==
He is married to Rose Sibley Simmons and has four children, including Senator Sarita Simmons, who also represents the 13th district.
