= Scottie Cuevas =

American politician

Member of the Mississippi State Senate from the 46th district
- In office January 2, 1996 – January 8, 2008
- Preceded by: Bill Johnson
- Succeeded by: David Baria

Personal details
- Born: Scottie Revette Cuevas; November 26, 1965 (age 60) Gulfport, Mississippi, U.S.
- Party: Democratic (before 2011); Republican (since 2011)
- Spouse: April Welsh

Scottie Revette Cuevas (born November 26, 1965) is an American politician. He served as a Democratic member of the Mississippi State Senate from 1996 to 2008. He was defeated for reelection in 2007, losing to primary challenger David Baria by 36 votes. From January 2004 through December 2007, he served as chairman of the Senate Committee on Economic Development and Committee on Tourism.

In 2011, he sought the Republican nomination for Mississippi Transportation Commissioner from the Southern District, losing to Senator Tom King.

In 2020, he ran for Harrison County Tax Collector, ultimately placing in third behind Sharon Nash Barnett and Connie Rockco.
