= De'Keither Stamps =

American politician

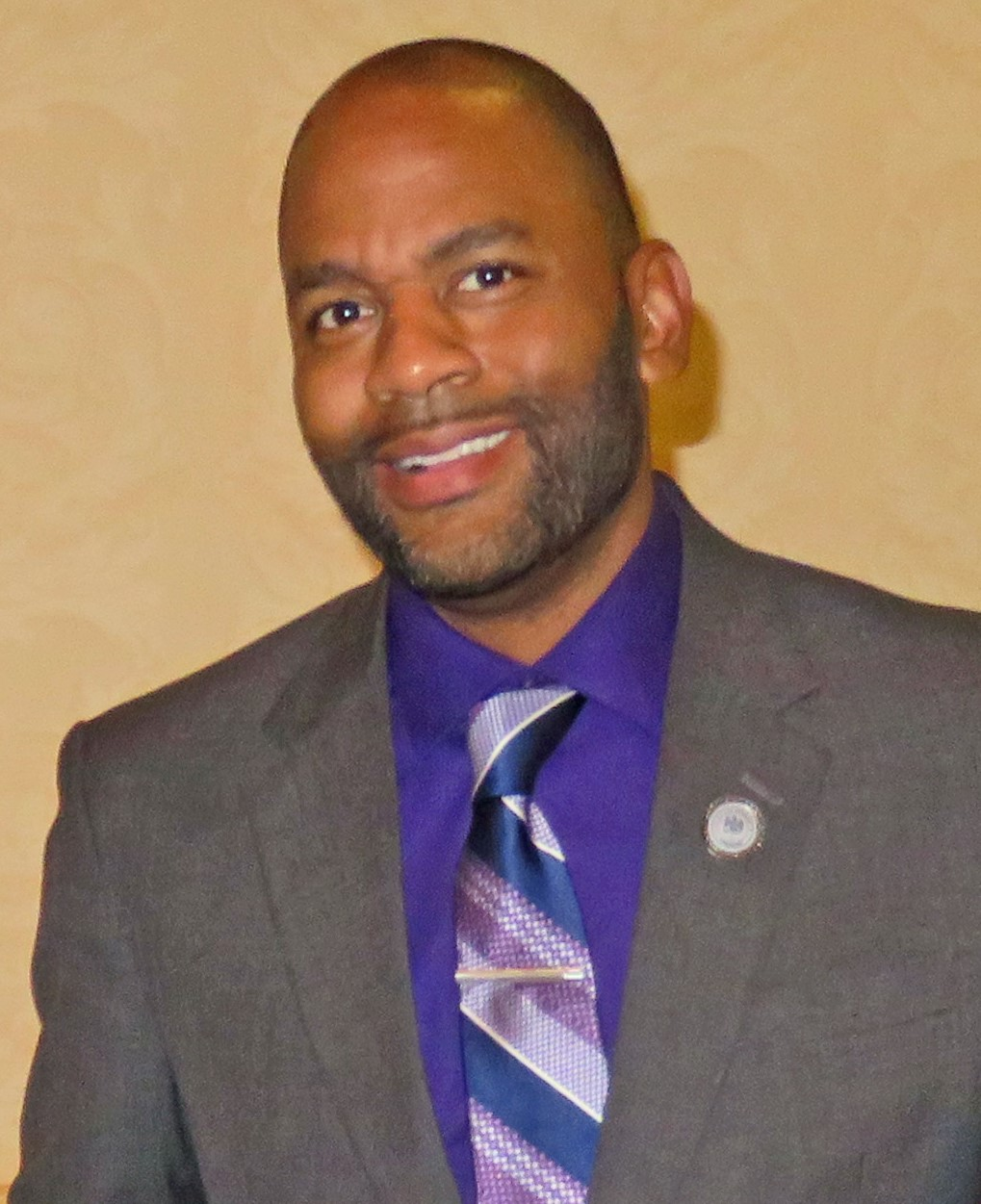
- Stamps in 2016

Member of the Mississippi Public Service Commission from the Central district
- Incumbent
- Assumed office January 4, 2024
- Governor: Tate Reeves
- Preceded by: Brent Bailey

Member of the Mississippi House of Representatives from the 66th district
- In office October 16, 2020 – January 2, 2024
- Preceded by: Jarvis Dortch
- Succeeded by: Fabian Nelson

Personal details
- Born: November 21, 1976 (age 49) Learned, Mississippi, U.S.
- Party: Democratic
- Children: 3
- Education: Marine Corps University (attended)

Military service
- Branch/service: United States Marine Corps; United States Army
- Years of service: 1995–2002 (Marine Corps); 2005–2007 (Army)
- Battles/wars: Iraq War

De'Keither Stamps (born November 21, 1976) is an American politician serving as a member of the Mississippi Public Service Commission. He previously served in the Mississippi House of Representatives from the 66th district as a Democrat from 2020 to 2024. He ran for the 2023 election to the Mississippi Public Service Commission for the Central District, defeating Republican incumbent Brent Bailey in a rematch of their 2019 race. He assumed office in 2024.

== Early life and education ==
Stamps was born on November 21, 1976, in Learned, Mississippi, and was raised in nearby Jackson, Mississippi. He attended Forest Hill High School before transferring and graduating from Crystal Springs High School in 1995. He also attended Marine Corps University.

== Career ==
Stamps joined the United States Marine Corps and was assigned to President Bill Clinton's security team, serving three years in that role. Stamps was later a military security officer assigned to American embassies in Africa, Switzerland, and the United Kingdom, spending three years in that role before discharging in 2002. He joined the United States Army in 2005 as a member of the 82nd Airbornes to fight in the Iraq War and served three years over two consecutive deployments.

A Democrat, Stamps served on the Jackson City Council for Ward 4 from 2013 to 2020. As a council member, he objected to the Jackson's mayor open carry gun ban. With the resignation of Representative Jarvis Dortch, Stamps filed to fill the vacancy for the Mississippi House of Representatives. He greatly outraised his contender Bob Lee and won the October 16, 2020 special election. He was appointed to the Constitution, Investigate State Offices, Military Affairs, Municipalities, and Public Utilities committees. He co-sponsored a bill protecting Mississippi students’ right to free speech. He voiced opposition to an election bill that would revise voter rolls.

He ran for election for the Mississippi Public Service Commission for the central district in 2019, narrowly losing to Brent Bailey 50.3% to 49.7%. He ran again in 2023 in what was considered a competitive race. In an interview for the race, he emphasized affordability, reliability, and return on investment of utilities in ratemaking. He supported a consumer advocate position at the commission. He narrowly flipped the seat 51.1% to 48.9%, making him the only Democrat on the commission.
