= Charles Busby (politician) =

American politician

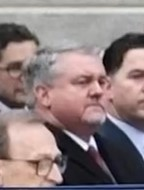

Member of the Mississippi Transportation Commission from the Southern district
- Incumbent
- Assumed office January 4, 2024
- Governor: Tate Reeves
- Preceded by: Tom King

Member of the Mississippi House of Representatives from the 111th district
- In office January 5, 2012 – January 4, 2024
- Preceded by: Brandon Jones
- Succeeded by: Jimmy Fondren

Personal details
- Born: July 24, 1963 (age 62) Laurel, Mississippi, U.S.
- Party: Republican
- Spouse: Felicia
- Education: Mississippi Gulf Coast Community College (AS); University of South Alabama (BS)

Charles Harold Busby (born July 24, 1963) is an American politician, engineer, and businessman who served as a member of the Mississippi House of Representatives from the 111th district. He assumed office in 2012 and served until 2024. He currently serves as the Transportation Commissioner for the Southern District, where he assumed office on January 4, 2024.

== Early life and education ==
Busby was born in Laurel, Mississippi, and raised in Pascagoula, Mississippi. He earned an Associate of Science degree in pre-engineering from Mississippi Gulf Coast Community College in 1987 and a Bachelor of Science in mechanical engineering from the University of South Alabama in 1991.

== Career ==
Busby first worked as a project engineer for Brown & Root and later for Chevron and the Herzog-Hart Corporation. From 2001 to 2023, he served as the president of Orion Engineering. He also worked for Sirius Technical Services.

He is a member of the Pascagoula Rotary Club, Jackson County Chamber of Commerce, Jackson County Economic Development FDN, American Society of Mechanical Engineers, American Council of Engineering Companies, and the National Rifle Association of America.

Politics

He was elected to the Mississippi House of Representatives in 2012. From 2016 to 2023, Busby has served as chair of the House Transportation Committee. He has also served on the state committees of Appropriations, Education, Energy, Gaming, Insurance, Interstate Cooperation, Marine Resources, and Ports, Harbors, and Airports.

On August 10, 2022, Busby announced he would run in the 2023 Mississippi elections for Transportation Commissioner for the Southern District, a position held by outgoing Republican Tom King. He won the seat by a large majority against independent Steve Griffin. He assumed office January 4, 2024.

== Personal life ==
He is married to Felicia Hillman and resides in Pascagoula.
