= Intermodal transport =

Intermodal transport (or intermodal transportation) involves the use of more than one mode of transport for a journey. It may refer to:

- Intermodal passenger transport
- Intermodal freight transport
