= Mississippi Transportation Commission =

Government transportation agency in the U.S. state of Mississippi

Agency overview
- Formed: 1992
- Preceding agency: Mississippi Highway Commission
- Jurisdiction: State of Mississippi
- Headquarters: Jackson, Mississippi
- Agency executives: John Caldwell, Commissioner for the Northern District; Willie Lee Simmons, Commissioner for the Central District; Charles Busby, Commissioner for the Southern District
- Child agency: Mississippi Department of Transportation
- Website: mdot.ms.gov/portal/commission

The Mississippi Transportation Commission is a government agency in the U.S. state of Mississippi which is responsible for overseeing the Mississippi Department of Transportation, overseeing the transportation industry, and formulating state transportation policy. It is the only popularly elected state transportation board in the United States.

== History ==
On March 29, 1916, the Mississippi Legislature created the Mississippi State Highway Commission. Originally consisting of three members, the commission held its first meeting on April 14 to discuss the disbursement of federal funds and coordinate a highway planning program with the U.S. Bureau of Public Roads. In 1920, Governor Lee M. Russell expanded the commission with five additional members. In 1930, the legislature passed the Stansel Act, restoring the commission as a body consisting of three popularly elected commissioners. In the 1980s, Governor William Allain pushed for the State Highway Department to be reorganized—with the highway commissioners to be appointed by the governor and not popularly elected—but his proposal failed due to legislative opposition. In July 1992, the State Highway Commission and State Highway Department were reorganized as the Mississippi Transportation Commission and the Mississippi Department of Transportation. Dick Hall was the longest-tenured transportation commissioner, serving from 1999 until 2019. Willie Lee Simmons, the first black person to serve on the commission, assumed office in 2020.

== Powers and responsibilities ==
The Mississippi Transportation Commission is a part of the executive branch of Mississippi's state government. It is the only popularly-elected state transportation board in the United States. Per state law, the commission is responsible for developing an intermodal transport policy for the state. It oversees all aeronautical, highway, port, railroad, and public transit in Mississippi. The commission appoints the executive director of the Mississippi Department of Transportation to oversee daily administrative matters in the agency, with their choice subject to the approval of the Mississippi State Senate. A majority vote of the commission is required to disburse money from the state's Emergency Road and Bridge Repair fund.

== Structure ==
The Mississippi Transportation Commission is led by three commissioners. One commissioner is elected by voters in each of the state's three Supreme Court districts, and the commissioners elect a chairman among their own members. The commissioners' individual salaries are $78,000 per year, but are set to increase to $95,000 annually in 2024. The Commission meets on the second and fourth Tuesday of each month at its offices in Jackson. The Central District commissioner keeps an office in Jackson, while the Northern District commissioner keeps an office in Tupelo and the Southern District commissioner maintains one in Hattiesburg.

== Current commissioners ==
The current commissioners are below.

District	Name	Party	Start	Next Election
Northern	John Caldwell	Republican	January 7, 2020	2027
Central	Willie Simmons, Chair	Democratic	January 7, 2020	2027
Southern	Charles Busby	Republican	January 4, 2024	2027

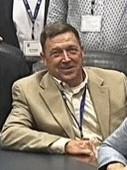
John Caldwell (Republican)
Northern District

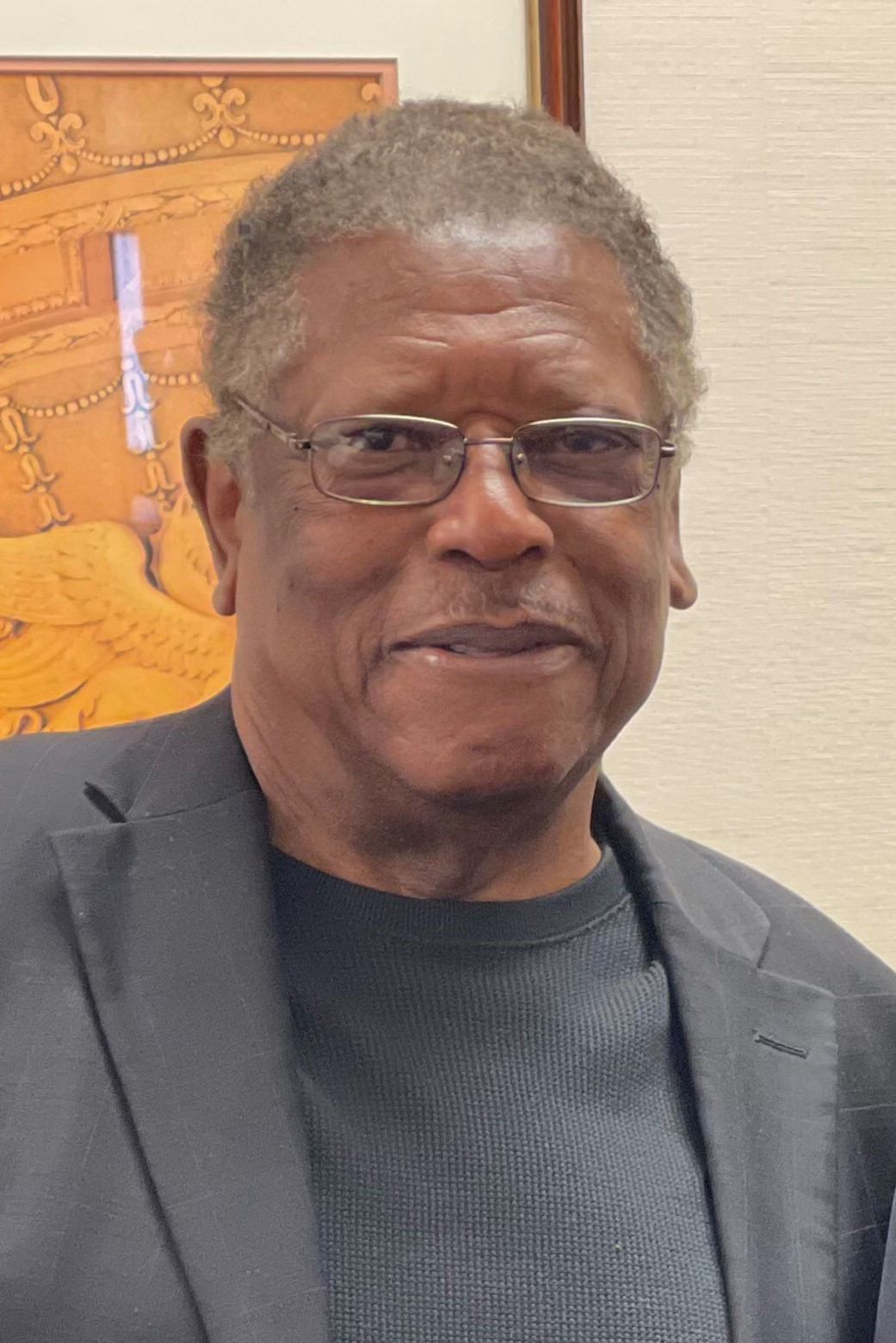
Willie Lee Simmons (Democrat)
Central District

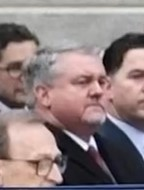
Charles Busby (Republican)
Southern District

== Works cited ==
- Nash, Jere; Taggart, Andy (2009). Mississippi Politics: The Struggle for Power, 1976-2008 (second ed.). University Press of Mississippi. ISBN 9781604733570.
