= Robert Crook =

American politician

Member of the Mississippi Senate
- In office January 1964 – January 1992

Personal details
- Born: Robert Lacey Crook; April 22, 1929 Bolton, Mississippi, U.S.
- Died: January 26, 2011 (aged 81) Jackson, Mississippi, U.S.

Robert Lacey Crook (April 22, 1929 – January 26, 2011) was an American politician from Mississippi.

== Early life and education ==
Robert Lacey Crook was born in Bolton, Mississippi and grew up in Ruleville, Mississippi. He served in the United States Marine Corps during World War II. Crook went to the University of Mississippi, the Mississippi College School of Law, and then practiced law.

== Career ==
Crook served in the Mississippi State Senate from 1964 to 1992 and was a Democrat. He served as chairman of the Senate Fees and Salaries Committee for 20 years, setting policy on compensation for state and local officials.

Crook died from undisclosed causes at his home in Jackson, Mississippi at the age of 81.

== Personal life ==
Crook had a wife, two sons, and a grandson.
