= Mississippi Public Service Commission =

Government regulatory agency in the U.S. state of Mississippi

Agency overview
- Formed: 1938
- Preceding agency: Mississippi Railway Commission
- Type: Public utilities commission
- Jurisdiction: State of Mississippi
- Headquarters: Woolfolk State Office Building, Jackson, Mississippi
- Agency executives: Chris Brown, Commissioner for the Northern District; De'Keither Stamps, Commissioner for the Central District; Wayne Carr, Commissioner for the Southern District
- Website: www.psc.ms.gov

The Mississippi Public Service Commission (MPSC or PSC) is a government agency which regulates telecommunications, electric, gas, water and sewer utilities in the U.S. state of Mississippi. The commission was created in 1884 and in its early history was tasked with regulating various transport and telecommunications industries in the state. It assumed its current name in 1938 and was given jurisdiction over electric, gas, and water utilities in 1956.

The agency is led by three commissioners, with one commissioner elected by voters in each of the state's three Supreme Court districts. Commissioners are elected to four year terms in the general election of the same year that other state and county officials are chosen. The current commissioners are Chris Brown (Northern District), De'Keither Stamps (Central District) and Wayne Carr (Southern District).

== History ==
On March 11, 1884, legislation was signed into law creating the Mississippi Railroad Commission. During its early years the commission was tasked with regulating various enterprises, including railroads, telephone and telegraph companies, express companies, and some motor carriers. The newly-adopted state constitution in 1890 explicitly authorized the Mississippi State Legislature to empower a commission to regulate such industries. The first commissioners were appointed by the governor of Mississippi and then selected thereafter by the legislature to serve two-year terms until 1892. From 1886 to 1906 the body served as the Board of Control of the Mississippi State Penitentiary.

During the legislature's 1938 session, the Motor Carrier Regulatory Act was passed. The law changed the name of the Railroad Commission to the Public Service Commission and gave it full responsibility for regulating motor carriers. In 1956, the Utility Act was adopted, expanding the commission's jurisdiction to electric, gas, and water utilities. Sewer services were integrated into its purview in 1968. The Public Utilities Reform Act of 1983 provided for the hiring of additional staff and tasked the commission with monitoring large contracts and construction projects undertaken by utility companies.

In January 1988, Public Service Commissioner Lynn Havens resigned from office before pleading guilty in June 1989 to conspiracy charges related to an attempt to coerce a power company to settle a lawsuit. Commissioner D.W. Snyder was also convicted for his involvement in the scheme and resigned. In response, the legislature floated several proposals in 1990 to reform the commission. They rejected a plan to have the commissioners chosen by appointment and instead opted to move the Public Utilities Staff—responsible for supplying the commissioners technical advice—to a new Public Utilities Staff agency under the control of an executive director appointed by the governor. The legislation also barred commissioners from having private meetings with or accepting gifts and campaign contributions from utility representatives.

In 2003, the legislature passed the Mississippi Telephone Solicitation Act, creating an official state do not call list and giving the PSC the power to fine telemarketers who called persons who registered their phone numbers on the list. On July 1, 2004, the responsibility for regulating motor carriers was transferred from the PSC to the Mississippi Department of Transportation.

== Powers and responsibilities ==
The Public Service Commission is responsible for regulating telecommunications, electric, gas, water, and sewer utilities in Mississippi. It monitors and approves rates charged to consumers, (Note: Legal cases arising from actions taken by the commission to alter utility rates are expedited and heard by the Supreme Court of Mississippi.) monitors the delivery of services, and determines whether the construction of utility facilities are for the benefit of the public. Per state law, it can fix "reasonable standards, regulations and practices of service" for utility companies and impose safety standards on gas utilities. When a new executive director of the Public Utilities Staff is sought, the commissioners are required to suggest at least three candidates for the post to the governor, who then nominates one of the candidates to be confirmed in the post by the State Senate.

The PSC fields utility consumer complaints, holds hearings, and makes investigations into utility complaints and instances of telemarketing fraud. The commission has the power to issue subpoenas. It can prescribe mandates to utility companies and fine them up to $5,000 per day for outstanding violations and can issue fines no greater than $10,000 to telemarketing firms which violate state laws.

== Structure ==
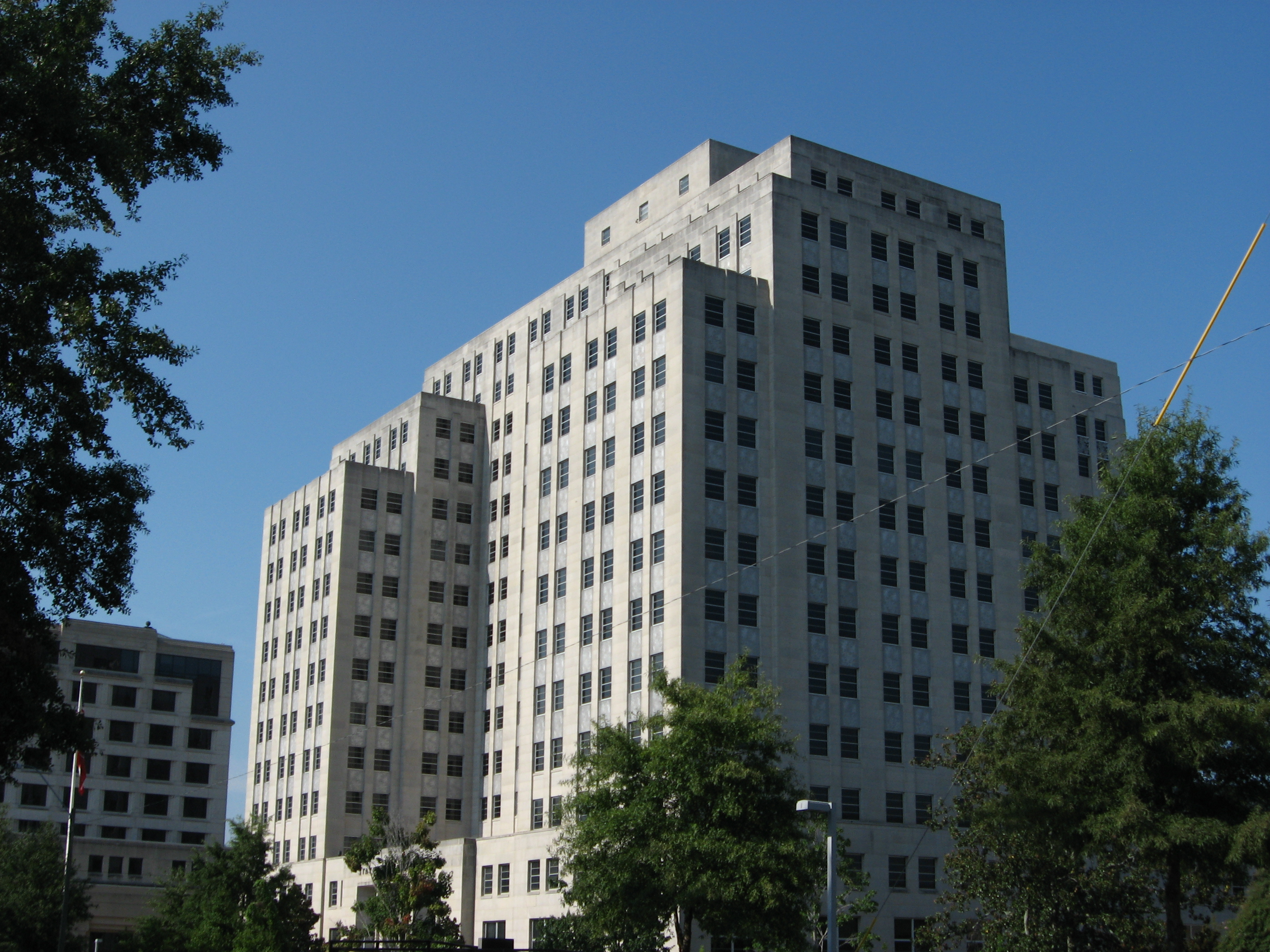
The PSC is headquartered in the Woolfolk State Office Building in Jackson.

The Public Service Commission is led by three commissioners. One commissioner is elected by voters in each of the state's three Supreme Court districts. Commissioners are elected in the general election of the same year that other state and county officials are chosen. Candidates for seats on the body are required by the state constitution and state statute to have resided in Mississippi for at least five years before the date of the election to be eligible. The commissioners serve four-year terms beginning on January 1 of the year following the election. Vacancies are filled by gubernatorial appointment. The commissioners' individual salaries are $78,000 per year, but are set to increase to $95,000 annually in 2024. They are required to meet by law the first Tuesday of every month in their office, though they may skip up to two such meetings per annum. They may also convene additional meetings elsewhere as they deem necessary. The meetings are subject to the state open meeting law and the presence of two commissioners constitutes a quorum. The commission's activities are funded by appropriations from the State Legislature. The agency is headquartered in the Woolfolk State Office Building in Jackson, Mississippi.

The commission retains an executive secretary, whose office is responsible for keeping the minutes of commission meetings, maintaining a record of its official actions, and delivering its subpoenas. The Finance and Personnel Department oversees the commission's finances and staff. The Legal Department, led by a general counsel, offers the PSC legal advice and coordinates its litigation-related activities. The Information Systems Department maintains the PSC's internal online network, supplies information technology support to staff, and runs the agency's website. The Utility Investigation Department fields consumer complaints and monitors service delivery. The Gas Pipeline Safety Division performs safety inspections of intrastate natural gas pipelines. The Public Utilities Staff is not controlled by the commission but is tasked with advising it on the suitability of rates charged and services delivered to consumers and making recommendations for courses of action it should pursue.

== Current commissioners ==
The current commissioners are:

District	Name	Party	Start	Next Election
Northern	Chris Brown	Republican	January 4, 2024	2027
Central	De'Keither Stamps	Democratic	January 4, 2024	2027
Southern	Wayne Carr, Chair	Republican	January 4, 2024	2027

== Works cited ==
- Mississippi Public Service Commission Annual Report Ending June 30, 2022 (PDF), Mississippi Public Service Commission, 2022
- Mississippi Public Service Commission Annual Report Ending June 2017, Mississippi Public Service Commission, 2017
- Pugh, Brian A. (2020). Chaos and Compromise: The Evolution of the Mississippi Budgeting Process. University Press of Mississippi. ISBN 9781496830227.
- Strauss, Scott H.; Mapes, Katharine M. (November 2018), The Role of State Utility Commissions in Setting Policy for Responsible Contracting (PDF), National Alliance For Fair Contracting
- Winkle, John W. III (2014). The Mississippi State Constitution (second ed.). Oxford University Press. ISBN 9780199300631.
