= 1979 United States elections =

- ← 1977 1978 1979 1980 1981 → Off-year elections
- Election day: November 6

Congressional special elections
- Seats contested: 2
- Net seat change: Republican +1

Gubernatorial elections
- Seats contested: 3
- Net seat change: Republican +1
- 1979 gubernatorial election results map

Legend
- Democratic hold Republican gain No election

Elections were held on November 6, 1979. This off-year election primarily involved local, state, and congressional elections.

== Background ==
The 1979 elections occurred in the final year of President Jimmy Carter's first and only term. Minor gains occurred for the Republican party as a result of increasing stagflation.

== Congressional elections ==
Two special elections were held to fill vacancies in the House of Representatives. The most notable race was that for California's eleventh district, whose previous representative had been shot and killed by members of the Peoples Temple in Jonestown, Guyana.

District	Incumbent			This race	
District	Member	Party	First elected	Results	Candidates
California 11	Leo Ryan	Democratic	1972	Incumbent member-elect was murdered November 18, 1978. New member elected April 3, 1979. Republican gain.	▌ ✓ William Royer (Republican) 57.3%; ▌G. W. Holsinger (Democratic) 41.1%; ▌Nicholas Waeil Kudrovzeff (American Independent) 0.8%; ▌Wilson Branch (Peace & Freedom) 0.8%
Wisconsin 6	William A. Steiger	Republican	1966	Incumbent member-elect died December 4, 1978. New member elected April 3, 1979. Republican hold.	▌ ✓ Tom Petri (Republican) 50.4%; ▌Gary Goyke (Democratic) 49.6%

== Gubernatorial elections ==
Three states held gubernatorial elections in 1979.

State	Incumbent	First elected	Result	Candidates
Kentucky	Julian Carroll (Democratic)	1974 (Note: Carroll took office after his predecessor (Wendell Ford) resigned.)	Incumbent term-limited. New governor elected. Democratic hold.	✓ John Y. Brown Jr. (Democratic) 59.41%; Louie Nunn (Republican) 40.59%
Louisiana	Edwin Edwards (Democratic)	1972	Incumbent term-limited. New governor elected. Republican gain.	✓ Dave Treen (Republican) 21.79% (50.35% in Runoff); Louis Lambert (Democratic) 20.74% (49.65% in Runoff); Jimmy Fitzmorris (Democratic) 20.56%; Paul Hardy (Democratic) 16.62%; E. L. Henry (Democratic) 9.94; Edgar G. "Sonny" Mouton Jr. (Democratic) 9.103%; L. D. Knox (Democratic) 0.46%
Mississippi	Cliff Finch (Democratic)	1975	Incumbent term-limited. New governor elected. Democratic hold.	✓ William Winter (Democratic) 61.07%; Gil Carmichael (Republican) 38.93%

== State legislative elections ==
State legislative elections were also held in various states across the country. These elections determined the control of state legislatures, which would play a crucial role in the redistricting process following the 1980 census.

== Local elections ==
In addition to state and congressional races, numerous local elections were held. These elections included mayoral races, city council elections, and referendums on key issues such as taxation and public services.

- San Francisco: Incumbent mayor Dianne Feinstein was reëlected with 53.96 percent of the second round vote.
- Boston: Incumbent mayor Kevin White was reëlected to a fourth term in a rematch, receiving 54.82% of the vote.
