= 1979 United States gubernatorial elections =

- October 27, November 6, and December 8, 1979

4 governorships 3 states; 1 territory
	Majority party	Minority party
Party	Democratic	Republican
Seats before	32	18
Seats after	31	19
Seat change	▼1	▲1
Seats up	3	0
Seats won	2	1
- Democratic hold Republican gain

United States gubernatorial elections were held in the fall of 1979, in three states and one territory.

Republicans gained one gubernatorial seat in this year with Dave Treen's victory in Louisiana, who, as a result, became the first Republican Governor of that state since the Reconstruction era. Treen led a field of six major candidates in the October 27 primary and narrowly edged state senator Louis Lambert in the December 8 general election (or "runoff"). This was the first gubernatorial election in Louisiana's history that was conducted under the nonpartisan blanket primary (a.k.a. "jungle primary") format.

Democrats held control of the governor's mansions in Kentucky and Mississippi in the November 6 general elections.

== Election results ==
State	Incumbent	Party	First elected	Result	Candidates
Kentucky	Julian Carroll	Democratic	1974 (Note: Carroll took office after his predecessor (Wendell Ford) resigned.)	Incumbent term-limited. New governor elected. Democratic hold.	✓ John Y. Brown Jr. (Democratic) 59.41%; Louie Nunn (Republican) 40.59%
Louisiana	Edwin Edwards	Democratic	1972	Incumbent term-limited. New governor elected. Republican gain.	✓ Dave Treen (Republican) 21.79% (50.35% in Runoff); Louis Lambert (Democratic) 20.74% (49.65% in Runoff); Jimmy Fitzmorris (Democratic) 20.56%; Paul Hardy (Democratic) 16.62%; E. L. Henry (Democratic) 9.94; Edgar G. "Sonny" Mouton Jr. (Democratic) 9.103%; L. D. Knox (Democratic) 0.46%
Mississippi	Cliff Finch	Democratic	1975	Incumbent term-limited. New governor elected. Democratic hold.	✓ William Winter (Democratic) 61.07%; Gil Carmichael (Republican) 38.93%

== Close states ==
States where the margin of victory was under 1%:

1. Louisiana, 0.7%

== Kentucky ==
1979 Kentucky gubernatorial election
- November 6, 1979
- Turnout: 54.3%
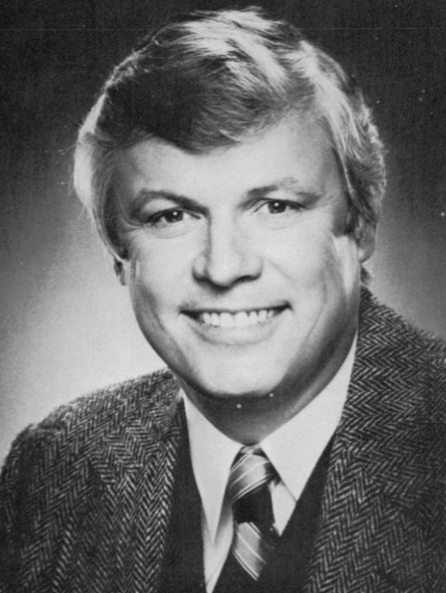

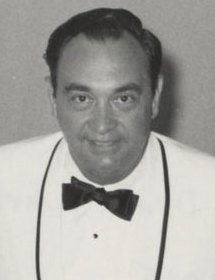
Nominee	John Y. Brown Jr.	Louie Nunn
Party	Democratic	Republican
Popular vote	558,008	381,278
Percentage	59.41%	40.59%
- Brown: 50–60% 60–70% 70–80% Nunn: 50–60% 60–70% 70–80%
Governor before election
Julian Carroll
Democratic
Elected Governor
John Y. Brown Jr.
Democratic

The 1979 Kentucky gubernatorial election was held on November 6, 1979. Democratic nominee John Y. Brown Jr. defeated Republican nominee Louie Nunn with 59.41% of the vote.

== Louisiana ==
1979 Louisiana gubernatorial election
- October 27, 1979 (first round); December 8, 1979 (runoff)
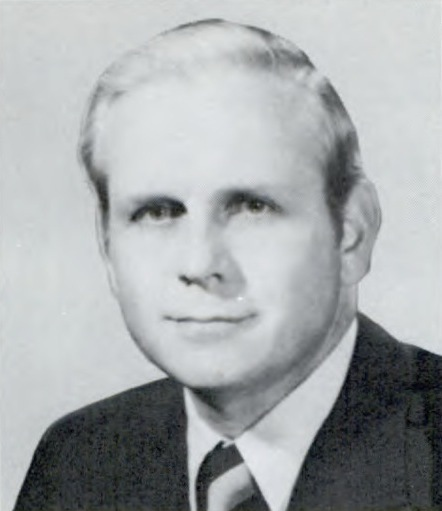

Candidate	Dave Treen	Louis Lambert	Jimmy Fitzmorris
Party	Republican	Democratic	Democratic
First round	297,674; 21.79%	283,266; 20.74%	280,760; 20.56%
Runoff	690,691; 50.35%	681,134; 49.65%	Eliminated
Candidate	Paul Hardy	E. L. "Bubba" Henry	Edgar G. "Sonny" Mouton, Jr.
Party	Democratic	Democratic	Democratic
First round	227,026; 16.62%	135,769; 9.94%	124,333; 9.1%
Runoff	Eliminated	Eliminated	Eliminated
- Treen: 20–30% 30–40% 50–60% 60–70% 70–80% Lambert: 20–30% 30–40% 40–50% 50–60% 60–70% 70–80% 80–90% Fitzmorris: 20–30% 30–40% 40–50% Hardy: 20-30% 30-40% 40-50% 50-60% Henry: 20–30% 30–40% 40–50% Mouton: 40–50%
Governor before election
Edwin Edwards
Democratic
Elected Governor
Dave Treen
Republican

The 1979 Louisiana gubernatorial election was held on December 8, 1979. Incumbent Governor Edwin Edwards was ineligible to run for a third term, making it the only gubernatorial election in Louisiana between 1972 and 1991 to not feature Edwards as a candidate. In the race to succeed him, Dave Treen narrowly defeated Louis Lambert to become the first Republican governor of Louisiana since the Reconstruction Era.

This was the first gubernatorial election held after the adoption of the Louisiana primary in 1978. In the primary election held on October 27, Treen and Lambert finished first and second, respectively, to advance against a field of Democratic candidates including Lieutenant Governor Jimmy Fitzmorris, Secretary of State Paul Hardy, speaker of the Louisiana House E. L. Henry, and state senator Sonny Mouton.

== Mississippi ==
1979 Mississippi gubernatorial election
- November 6, 1979
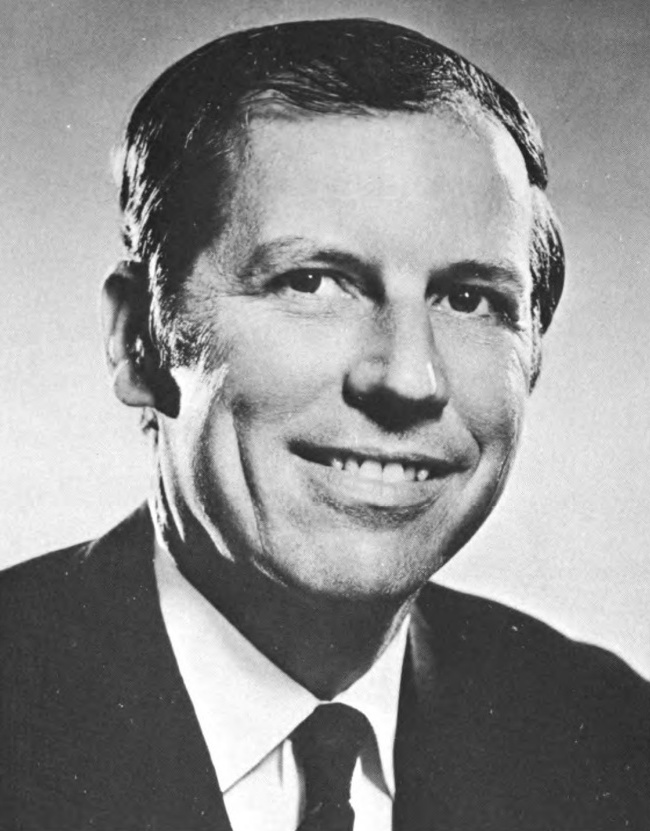

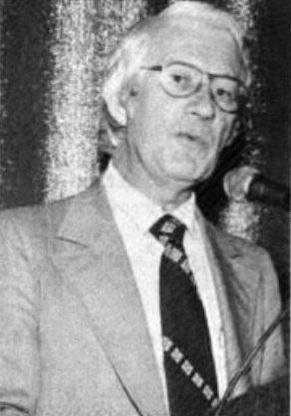
Nominee	William F. Winter	Gil Carmichael
Party	Democratic	Republican
Popular vote	413,620	263,702
Percentage	61.1%	38.9%
- County results Winter: 50-60% 60-70% 70-80% 80-90% Carmichael: 50-60%
Governor before election
Cliff Finch
Democratic
Elected Governor
William Winter
Democratic

The 1979 Mississippi gubernatorial election took place on November 6, 1979, in order to elect the Governor of Mississippi. Incumbent Democrat Cliff Finch was term-limited, and could not run for reelection to a second term.
