= Evelyn Gandy =

American politician

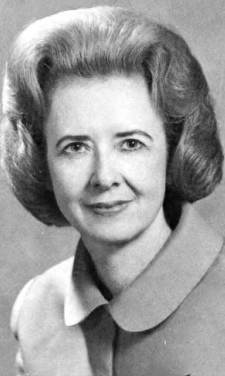
- Gandy c. 1973

Lieutenant Governor of Mississippi
- In office January 14, 1976 – January 16, 1980
- Governor: Cliff Finch
- Preceded by: William F. Winter
- Succeeded by: Brad Dye

Insurance Commissioner of Mississippi
- In office January 17, 1972 – 1976
- Governor: Bill Waller
- Preceded by: Walter Dell Davis
- Succeeded by: George Dale

State Treasurer of Mississippi
- In office 1968–1972
- Governor: John Bell Williams
- Preceded by: William F. Winter
- Succeeded by: Brad Dye
- In office January 1960 – 1964
- Governor: Ross Barnett
- Preceded by: Robert D. Morrow, Sr.
- Succeeded by: William F. Winter

Personal details
- Born: September 4, 1920 Hattiesburg, Mississippi, U.S.
- Died: December 23, 2007 (aged 87) near Hattiesburg, Mississippi, U.S.
- Party: Democratic
- Education: Mississippi Southern College; University of Mississippi School of Law
- Profession: Attorney

Edythe Evelyn Gandy (September 4, 1920 – December 23, 2007) was an American attorney and politician who served as Lieutenant Governor of Mississippi from 1976 to 1980. A Democrat who held several public offices throughout her career, she was the first woman elected to a statewide constitutional office in Mississippi. Born in Hattiesburg, she attended the University of Mississippi School of Law as the only woman in her class. Following graduation, she took a job as a research assistant for United States Senator Theodore Bilbo. She briefly practiced law before being elected to the Mississippi House of Representatives, where she served from 1948 to 1952. Defeated for re-election, she worked as director of the Division of Legal Services in the State Department of Public Welfare and Assistant Attorney General of Mississippi until she was elected State Treasurer of Mississippi in 1959.

Following an unsuccessful campaign for the office of lieutenant governor in 1963, Gandy was appointed State Welfare Board commissioner. She was re-elected state treasurer and served again in that role from 1968 to 1972. She subsequently became insurance commissioner, and in that capacity she investigated false advertising, lobbied for the passage of a no-fault insurance law, pushed for stronger licensing requirements for insurance agents, and restructured the Mississippi Insurance Department. In 1975 she ran a successful campaign to be elected lieutenant governor, thus becoming the first woman to serve in that role in Mississippi and in the Southern United States. Following unsuccessful gubernatorial campaigns in 1979 and 1983, Gandy returned to the practice of law. She remained publicly active in women's organizations and state Democratic politics until her death in 2007.

== Early life ==
Edythe Evelyn Gandy was born on September 4, 1920, to Kearney C. Gandy and Abbie Whigham Gandy in Hattiesburg, Mississippi, United States. Her parents encouraged her from a young age to pursue what interests she had without regard for her gender. She later credited her father, who had supported the women's suffrage movement, with being particularly supportive of her ambitions. She attended Hattiesburg High School, and in her senior year served as president of the debate club and edited the school yearbook and newspaper. Graduating from high school in 1938, she attended Mississippi Southern College before studying law at the University of Mississippi School of Law in Oxford. The only woman in her 1943 law school class, she won a state women's oratorical contest in 1941 and was the first woman to be elected president of the law school student body. She was also the first woman to edit the Mississippi Law Journal.

Following graduation from law school, Gandy sought to join the United States armed forces during World War II, but was disqualified due to nearsightedness. She then took a job as a research assistant in the office of Mississippi United States Senator Theodore Bilbo in Washington, D.C., as Bilbo was a family friend. During her employment Bilbo published a book detailing his views on racial segregation, entitled Take Your Choice: Separation or Mongrelization. Gandy was widely suspected to be the ghost writer of the work, and she later admitted to conducting most of the research for the book. In 1947, she opened a law practice. The following year she was elected treasurer of the Mississippi State Bar Association. She served as second vice president of the Hattiesburg chapter of the National Federation of Business and Professional Women's Clubs from 1951 to 1952 and second vice president of the state chapter in 1951 before becoming first vice president the following year. She was appointed to a two-year term on the Mississippi Congress of Parents and Teachers board of managers.

== Political career ==
=== Early activities ===
A Democrat, Gandy worked in the speaker's bureau of Paul B. Johnson Sr.'s 1939 gubernatorial campaign. She campaigned in 1947 to be elected to the Mississippi House of Representatives for the seat from Forrest County. She advocated for increased support for education, welfare, and the elderly. Billing herself as a racial segregationist, she supported the "Preservation of the customs and traditions of the South and enactment of the necessary legislation to preserve the white Democratic primary." One of her opponents, Lawrence D. Arrington, published an ad which asked "Do you believe that the legislative affairs of Forrest County can best be handled by a man or a woman?" The ad continued by suggesting that some elements of political activity would be inappropriate for a "young girl". She defeated Arrington in a primary runoff and was sworn-in in early 1948, working in the legislature for one four-year term. She closed her law practice to focus on her legislative duties but in September became a legal researcher for the State Department of Public Welfare.

In the House, Gandy was assigned to the ways and means, judiciary, eleemosynary institutions, colleges and universities, and claims committees. She introduced a successful bill to raise bond money for Hattiesburg city school construction and proposed another bill that would authorize Mississippi Southern College to establish its own nursing and law schools. She proposed other bills to establish a state department of labor and a state cosmetology board. After losing a bid for re-election to her House seat in the 1951 Democratic primary to Donald Colmer, Gandy became director of the Division of Legal Services in the Department of Public Welfare, where she served until she announced her resignation in February 1959, effective March 31.

=== State offices ===
In 1959 Gandy campaigned for election to the office of State Treasurer. Her main opponent was former Jackson mayor and investment banker Leland S. Speed. She attacked his credibility, arguing that his business connections disqualified him from handling public funds. She won, making her the first woman to be elected to a Mississippi statewide constitutional office and the second elected to a statewide office overall (after State Tax Collector Nellah Massey Bailey). On September 1, 1959, Gandy was appointed Assistant Attorney General of Mississippi by State Attorney General Joe Patterson. Serving in only a temporary capacity pending her swearing-in as state treasurer in January 1960, she was the first woman to hold the office. She served as state treasurer from 1960 to 1964, leaving office as state law at the time did not allow the treasurer to run for consecutive terms.

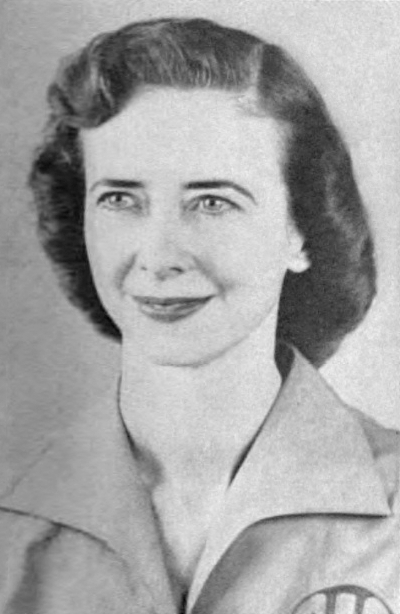
Gandy as State Treasurer, c. 1961

In 1963 Gandy ran for the office of Lieutenant Governor. Facing four opponents, she campaigned on her experience in government, pledging to focus on economic issues and education. She promised to treat the position as a "full time job". Framing herself as a segregationist, she supported states' rights, urging Mississippians to not support President John F. Kennedy and saying "We are now engaged in the greatest clash of Federal-State power which has occurred since the War Between the States one hundred years ago." Placing second in the first primary, she entered a runoff with the leading candidate, incumbent Carroll Gartin. He attacked her gender, with his campaign ads calling on voters to "elect a man". He won, taking 52 percent of the vote.

In 1964 Governor Paul B. Johnson Jr. appointed Gandy as State Welfare Board Commissioner. During her tenure the federal government passed the Civil Rights Act of 1964, which required that all programs which received federal funds could not discriminate based on race. Despite her own segregationist views, Gandy signed a pledge affirming that the welfare board would not discriminate and integrated the reception areas of state welfare offices. In 1965, she oversaw the launch of a monthly newsletter for the State Department of Public Welfare, The Observer. That year Johnson appointed her to the new Commission on the Status of Women. She resigned effective April 30, 1967, to prepare for a second campaign for state treasurer.

Facing no opposition in the Democratic primary or general election, Gandy was re-elected as State Treasurer and served again from 1968 to 1972. During that time, she lobbied for changes to the State Depository Act and implemented new policies which allowed public funds deposited in private banks to earn interest, enabling the state to make an additional $4 million within a year of the new measure. She also implemented a program to deposit state funds equally across banks in the state. A fiscal conservative, she opposed an attempt to amend the state constitution to allow the state to borrow more money through bond issues.

In 1971 Gandy ran for the office of insurance commissioner. Appealing more openly to women voters, her campaign distributed special emery boards. She defeated insurance salesman Truett Smith in the Democratic primary, taking the largest number of votes among any candidate for any office in the primary, and was unopposed in the general election. Upon taking office on January 17, 1972, she initiated an investigation into false advertising, lobbied for the passage of a no-fault insurance law, and pushed for enhanced advertising regulations and stronger licensing requirements for insurance agents. During her tenure the department released a training guide for agents to familiarize them with state standards. She also restructured the Mississippi Insurance Department into three divisions: one to manage insurance claims, one to conduct industry oversight, and another to handle complaints. In 1974 she introduced new fire safety rules for mobile home construction. That year declared her support for the ratification of the Equal Rights Amendment (ERA). Since she was the highest-ranking woman politician in the state, the media frequently asked her about the ERA, and she told The Clarion Ledger, "I personally favor it. But I don't believe it is a priority item for Mississippi women. There are other matters of more importance [...] such as education and health care." She held the insurance commissionership until 1976.

=== Lieutenant governor ===
With her term as insurance commissioner coming to a close, Gandy declared herself a candidate for the office of lieutenant governor in 1975. Her platform focused on improving job opportunities, particularly by expanding vocational training. She repeated her promise from 1963 that she would treat the position as "full time" and also called for government restructuring and campaign finance reform. Unlike in previous years, her campaign literature omitted any mention of her employment under Senator Bilbo. She led the first Democratic primary and won the runoff, against Brad Dye, with 52 percent of the vote. In the general election she faced Republican Bill Patrick, whom she defeated with 70 percent of the vote, thus becoming the first woman to serve as lieutenant governor in Mississippi and in the Southern United States. She was sworn in on January 14, 1976.

As lieutenant governor, Gandy presided over the Mississippi State Senate, which during her tenure comprised 52 male members. She was responsible for appointing the body's committees and mostly reappointed past committee chairs to leadership positions. Under internal party pressure, she reappointed William G. Burgin as chairman of the Senate Appropriations Committee despite suspicions that he was misappropriating funds. She removed Burgin from his chair in September 1978 after he was indicted on federal corruption charges. The action was unprecedented and provoked the ire of other senior senators, though the issue faded after Burgin was convicted a year later. Gandy otherwise maintained good relationships with committee chairmen during her tenure, though her critics attacked her as a defender of the status quo. To pass legislation she favored, she enlisted the assistance of a group of supportive senators known as "The Gandy Boys". She guided the passage of a bill to establish the State Ethics Commission and the passage of the Sixteenth Section Reform Act of 1978, which reformed the leasing of public school lands (she cast a tie-breaking vote in favor of the latter measure). She and Aaron Henry co-chaired the state's delegation to the 1976 Democratic National Convention and supported the nomination of Jimmy Carter as the party's presidential candidate. She also served as acting governor of Mississippi for a cumulative total of 248 days when Governor Cliff Finch was out of the state. She left office on January 16, 1980.

=== Gubernatorial campaigns ===
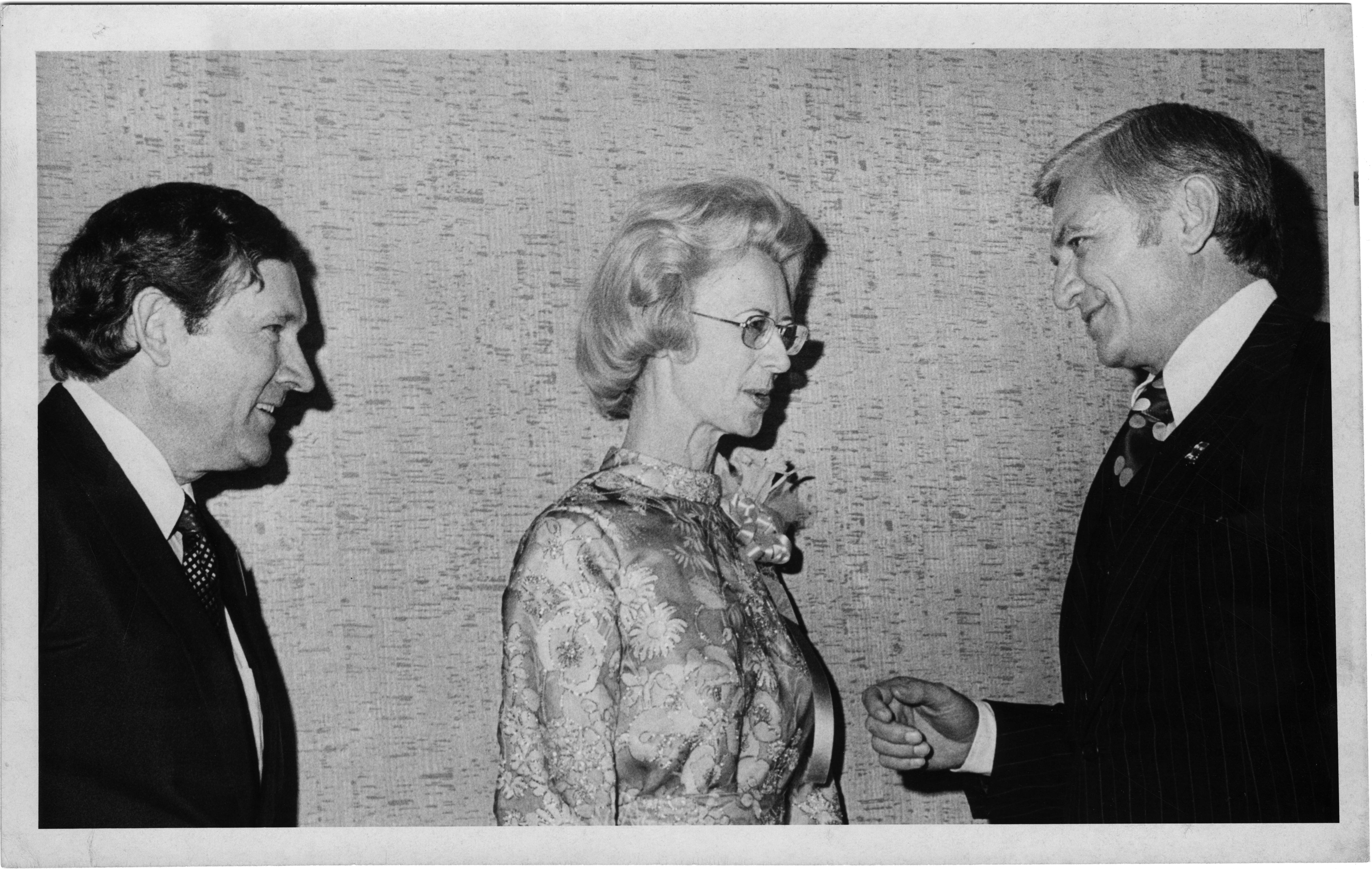
Gandy (center) with Governor Cliff Finch (right). Her main opponent in the 1979 gubernatorial campaign attempted to link her to problems in Finch's administration.

Gandy sought the office of Governor of Mississippi in the 1979 election, campaigning on a platform of economic growth and government reform. In the Democratic primary she faced William F. Winter, John Arthur Eaves, and three other candidates. Winter denounced the "corruption and mismanagement" of Governor Finch's administration and linked Finch's troubles with Gandy. In the first primary Gandy earned about 30 percent of the vote, while Winter received 25 percent. Winter was buoyed by his image as a moderate, professional, experienced public official which stood in sharp contrast to the public's perception of Finch's time in office as haphazard. Gandy's standing was harmed by her association with Finch and the fact that she was a woman. To capitalize on the latter factor, Winter's campaign organization attempted to craft an image of "toughness" for him, and released television commercials that showed him posing with tanks at Camp Shelby and firing a gun at a Mississippi Highway Patrol weapons range. She also refused an offer to debate Winter, citing schedule conflicts, creating doubts about her political abilities. Winter won the runoff with 57 percent of the vote. Gandy subsequently rejected an offer from Winter to take a position in his administration, but several months later was hired as the director of the Office of Human Resources Planning in the Department of Mental Health. By 1981 she was Deputy for Human Resources with the Department of Health.

Gandy ran again for gubernatorial office in 1983, facing Attorney General William Allain, businessman Mike Sturdivant, and two other candidates in the Democratic primary. She made more effort to appear charismatic and friendly, altering her appearance and hiring a professional campaign strategist for the first time in her political career. She also broadcast advertisements which described her as "tough". Her platform included education reform, controlling unemployment, expanding the National Guard, improved benefits for the elderly and disabled, and opposition to in-state radioactive waste disposal. Her opponents attacked her by linking her to her previous segregationist positions, with leaflets and a reprint of a 1963 ad showing her connections to Senator Bilbo distributed. Gandy initially reacted by expressing dismay at the strategy, before saying in a press conference that "[d]efense of segregation 20, 30, or 40 years ago was wrong" and that her previous statements "certainly do not reflect" her current views on race. She attempted to garner sympathy from black voters by pointing to discrimination she had faced because of her sex. Sturdivant aired television commercials which questioned whether a woman should lead the state, leading Gandy to denounce them as "insulting the women of Mississippi and the voters of Mississippi." She led in the first Democratic primary with 38 percent of the vote. In her runoff with Allain she authorized the broadcasting of attack ads against Allain, characterizing him as unlikely to cooperate with the legislature, a misogynist, and a "one issue candidate". He won with 52.3 percent of the vote. Journalist Bill Minor later said of Gandy, "She was a victim of the syndrome in Mississippi that women would not be elevated to high political office. Apparently, lieutenant governor is the ceiling."

== Later life ==
Following her loss in 1983, Gandy returned to legal practice, joining the firm of her friend Carroll Ingram in Hattiesburg in 1984. She rejected a suggestion from her friends that she seek gubernatorial office again in 1987 but remained publicly active in women's organizations and openly encouraged women to pursue careers as they saw fit. In 1994 she was hired as the director of legal services for Central Euro Telekom, a telecommunications company. In 1997 the American Bar Association bestowed on her the Margaret Brent Award for expanding opportunities for female attorneys. She remained involved in Mississippi Democratic politics until her death.

Gandy never married, instead enjoying the companionship of her sister, Frances. She was a distant cousin of politician Edwin L. Pittman. Gandy died on December 23, 2007, at her home near Hattiesburg after suffering from a lengthy bout of progressive supranuclear palsy. Her body lay in state in the rotunda of the Mississippi State Capitol, the first time such an honor had been granted to a woman. A memorial service was held for her in the rotunda on December 27 and a funeral was held the following day at Main Street United Methodist Church in Hattiesburg. She was buried at the city's Roseland Park Cemetery.

== Legacy ==
In 2002 the state of Mississippi declared that it would name a portion of State Highway 42 around Hattiesburg the Evelyn Gandy Parkway. It opened in 2006. The McCain Library and Archives maintains a collection of press clippings, speeches, photographs, and personal effects spanning her career. A bust of her is on display in a Senate committee room at the Mississippi State Capitol. Her death in 2007 spawned numerous laudatory obituaries which praised her as the first woman to serve in several offices and framed her as a public servant "committed to the common people". Mississippi Governor Haley Barbour credited her with "[breaking] the glass ceiling for women in politics and government". Historian Martha Swain described the passage of the Sixteenth Section Reform Act of 1978 as "her most important legacy". An equal pay bill named in her honor, the Evelyn Gandy Fair Pay Act, was introduced in the Mississippi State Legislature in 2019 but died in committee. In 2023 the University of Southern Mississippi launched the "Gandy Encyclopedia", an online project designed to provide content covering Gandy's life and work. The Southern Miss Speech & Debate Hall of Fame is named in her honor. The city of Hattiesburg unveiled a mural honoring Gandy in 2024.

== See also ==
- List of female lieutenant governors in the United States

== Works cited ==
- Bass, Jack (1995). The Transformation of Southern Politics: Social Change and Political Consequence Since 1945 (reprint ed.). University of Georgia Press. ISBN 9780820317281.
- Bolton, Charles C. (2013). William F. Winter and the New Mississippi: A Biography. Jackson: University Press of Mississippi. ISBN 978-1-61703-787-0.
- Brown, Victoria L.; Fendley, Seth; Fuderburk, Casey Malone Maugh (2017). "A Mississippi Woman of First: The Legacy of Edythe Evelyn Gandy". Mississippi Law Journal. 86 (4): 811–832.
- Danielson, Chris (2011). After Freedom Summer : How Race Realigned Mississippi Politics, 1965–1986. Gainesville: University of Florida Press. ISBN 9780813037387.
- Hawks, Joanne V.; Ellis, M. Carolyn; Morris, J. Byron (1981). "Women in the Mississippi legislature (1924-1981)". The Journal of Mississippi History. LVIII (4): 266–293.
- Mississippi Official and Statistical Register 1972–1976. Jackson: Mississippi Secretary of State. 1973. OCLC 1131544573.
- Mississippi Official and Statistical Register 1980–1984. Jackson: Mississippi Secretary of State. 1981. OCLC 1131544573.
- Nash, Jere; Taggart, Andy (2009). Mississippi Politics: The Struggle for Power, 1976-2008 (second ed.). University Press of Mississippi. ISBN 9781604733570.
- Smith, Pete (2017). ""A Lady of Many Firsts": Press Coverage of the Political Career of Mississippi's Evelyn Gandy, 1948-83". American Journalism. 34 (4): 407–426. doi:10.1080/08821127.2017.1382295. S2CID 158694281.
- Stuart, Lorraine A (2017). ""The Essentials of Good Citizenship": A Newly Discovered Archival Document in the Evelyn Gandy Papers". Southern Quarterly. 54 (2) (Winter ed.): 142–150, 172. ISSN 2377-2050.

Party political offices
Preceded by William F. Winter	Democratic nominee for Lieutenant Governor of Mississippi; 1975	Succeeded by Brad Dye
Political offices
Preceded by Robert D. Morrow, Sr.	Treasurer of Mississippi; 1960–1964	Succeeded by William F. Winter
Preceded by William F. Winter	Treasurer of Mississippi; 1968–1972	Succeeded by Brad Dye
Preceded by William F. Winter	Lieutenant Governor of Mississippi; 1976-1980	Succeeded by Brad Dye
