= 1972 United States Senate election in Mississippi =

- November 7, 1972
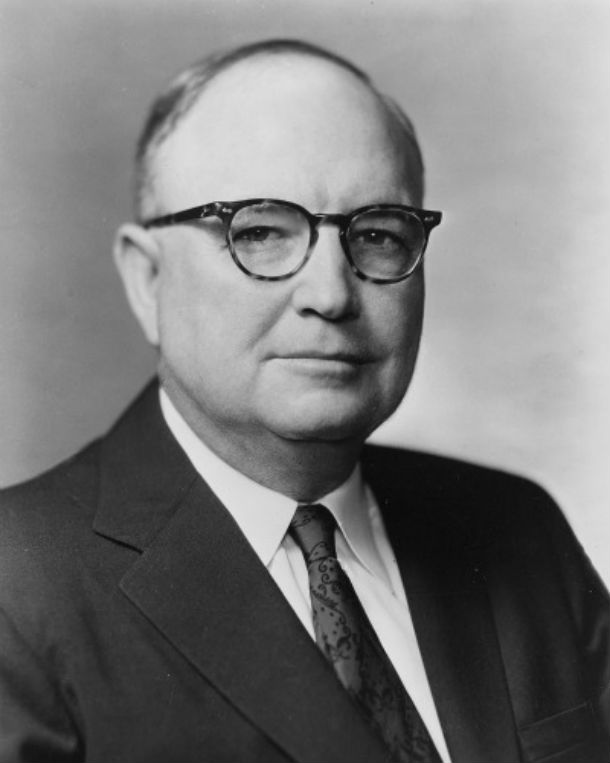

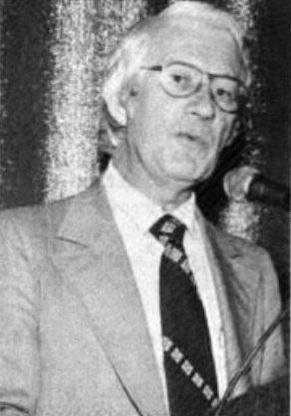
| Nominee | James Eastland | Gil Carmichael |
| Party | Democratic | Republican |
| Popular vote | 375,102 | 249,779 |
| Percentage | 58.09% | 38.68% |
- County results Eastland: 40–50% 50–60% 60–70% 70–80% 80–90% Carmichael: 40–50% 50–60%
U.S. senator before election
James Eastland
Democratic
Elected U.S. Senator
James Eastland
Democratic

The 1972 United States Senate election in Mississippi was held on November 7, 1972. Incumbent Democratic U.S. Senator James Eastland won re-election to his sixth term. This was the last time until 2026 that a Democrat won this Class 2 Senate seat.

Mississippi was one of fifteen states, alongside Alabama, Arkansas, Colorado, Delaware, Georgia, Iowa, Louisiana, Maine, Minnesota, Montana, New Hampshire, Rhode Island, South Dakota, and West Virginia, that were won by Republican President Richard Nixon in 1972 that elected Democrats to the United States Senate.

== Democratic primary ==
=== Candidates ===
==== Declared ====
- James Eastland, incumbent senator
- Louis Fondren, state representative
- Taylor Webb, president of the Mississippi Economic Council

==== Withdrew ====
- C. L. McKinley, pipefitter (to run as an independent candidate)

=== Results ===
1972 Democratic U.S. Senate primary
| Party | Candidate | Votes | % |
|---|---|---|---|
| Democratic | James Eastland (inc.) | 203,847 | 70.23% |
| Democratic | Taylor Webb | 67,656 | 23.21% |
| Democratic | Louis Fondren | 18,753 | 6.46% |
| Total votes | | 290,256 | 100.00% |

== Republican primary ==
=== Candidates ===
- Gil Carmichael, businessman
- James Meredith, Civil Rights Movement icon

=== Campaign ===
Meredith ran as an anti-Nixon candidate, while Carmichael supported President Nixon's re-election.

=== Results ===
1972 Republican U.S. Senate primary
| Party | Candidate | Votes | % |
|---|---|---|---|
| Republican | Gil Carmichael | 18,369 | 79.08% |
| Republican | James Meredith | 4,859 | 20.92% |
| Total votes | | 23,228 | 100.00% |

== General election ==
=== Candidates ===
- Gil Carmichael, businessman (Republican)
- James Eastland, incumbent senator since 1943 (Democratic)
- C.L. McKinley, pipefitter (Independent)
- Prentiss Walker, former congressman and Republican nominee for Senate in 1966 (Independent)

=== Results ===
Mississippi U.S. Senate election, 1972
| Party | Candidate | Votes | % | ±% |
|---|---|---|---|---|
| Democratic | James Eastland (inc.) | 375,102 | 58.09% | ▼7.47 |
| Republican | Gil Carmichael | 249,779 | 38.68% | ▲11.98 |
| Independent | Prentiss Walker | 14,662 | 2.27% | N/A |
| Independent | C.L.McKinley | 6,203 | 0.96% | N/A |

== See also ==
- 1972 United States Senate elections
