= 1980 United States redistricting cycle =

The 1980 United States redistricting cycle took place following the completion of the 1980 United States census. In all fifty states, various bodies re-drew state legislative and congressional districts. States that are apportioned more than one seat in the United States House of Representatives also drew new districts for that legislative body. The resulting new districts were first implemented for the 1981 and 1982 elections.

== U.S. House districts ==
Eliminated districts	Created districts
Illinois 23; Illinois 24; Indiana 11; Massachusetts 12; Michigan 19; Missouri 10; Nevada at-large; New Jersey 15; New York 35; New York 36; New York 37; New York 38; New York 39; Ohio 22; Ohio 23; Pennsylvania 24; Pennsylvania 25; South Dakota 1; South Dakota 2	Arizona 5; California 44; California 45; Colorado 6; Florida 16; Florida 17; Florida 18; Florida 19; New Mexico 3; Nevada 1; Nevada 2; Oregon 5; South Dakota at-large; Tennessee 9; Texas 25; Texas 26; Texas 27; Utah 3; Washington 8

== See also ==
- Redistricting in the United States
