= William Burgin =

William Burgin may refer to:

- William O. Burgin (1877–1946), U.S. Representative from North Carolina
- William G. Burgin, Mississippi state senator convicted of conspiracy to defraud the United States
