= Rod Miller =

Rod Miller may refer to:

- Roderick Miller (politician) (1924–2005), Louisiana politician
- Roderick Miller (footballer) (born 1992), Panamanian international footballer
- Rod Miller (baseball) (1940–2013), baseball player
- Rodney Miller, Australian police officer
