= Robert Louis Freeman Sr. =

American politician

Robert Freeman Sr.

47th Lieutenant Governor of Louisiana
- In office March 10, 1980 – March 14, 1988
- Governor: Dave Treen (1980-1984); Edwin Edwards (1984-1988)
- Preceded by: Jimmy Fitzmorris
- Succeeded by: Paul Hardy

Personal details
- Born: Robert Louis Freeman Sr. April 27, 1934 Plaquemine, Louisiana, U.S.
- Died: May 16, 2016 (aged 82) Baton Rouge, Louisiana, U.S.
- Party: Democratic
- Spouse: Marianne Drago Freeman (1958–2016)
- Education: Louisiana State University (BA); Loyola University New Orleans (LL.B)

Military service
- Allegiance: United States
- Branch/service: United States Army
- Years of service: 1956-1959

Robert Louis Freeman Sr. (April 27, 1934 – May 16, 2016) was an American politician who served as the 47th lieutenant governor of Louisiana from 1980 to 1988 under Governors Dave Treen and Edwin Edwards, having been elected in 1979.

== Early life and education ==
Freeman earned a bachelor's degree from Louisiana State University and L.L.B. from Loyola University New Orleans in 1965. He served in the United States Army from 1956 to 1959.

== Career ==
After earning his law degree, Freeman worked for a chemical company from 1960 to 1961. He later established his own law firm, Freeman and Pendley. Freeman served in the Louisiana House of Representatives from 1968 to 1980.

Freeman, a floor leader for Governor Edwin Edwards, was one of labor's strongest allies in either house of the Louisiana Legislature during his tenure. He vehemently opposed right-to-work legislation, which nonetheless became law in July 1976 despite unyielding opposition by Freeman, other pro-labor legislators, and Louisiana AFL-CIO president Victor Bussie.

In 1979, Freeman was elected lieutenant governor during the simultaneous gubernatorial election, inc which Democratic candidate Louis Lambert, strongly backed by Freeman and Edwards, was narrowly defeated by Dave Treen, who endorsed Freeman's runoff opponent, future Commissioner of Insurance Jim Donelon. Treen also angered Freeman by allowing the outgoing lieutenant governor, Jimmy Fitzmorris, to serve as the state's chief industrial recruiter.

During Treen's governorship, the two feuded on multiple occasions with Freeman using his powers whenever Treen was out of state while Treen attacked the lieutenant governorship position as an unnecessary waste of public funds due to the position having no official duties. In 1983, Treen vetoed a bill giving $381,000 in operating expenses to Freeman's office which forced him to fire 11 employees. He attempted to sue Treen in court, but was his veto was upheld in court. In the 1983 election he was backed by Edwin Edwards who was running for governor at the same time and in the initial election came in first against former Lieutenant Governor Jimmy Fitzmorris and in the runoff defeated him by 20%.

In the 1987 lieutenant gubernatorial initial election Freeman came in first with 40% of the vote, but in the runoff election he was defeated by former Secretary of State Paul Hardy. Hardy, an unsuccessful gubernatorial candidate in 1979, successfully tied Freeman to the scandal-plagued Edwards, who pulled out of the 1987 governor's race after running second to U.S. Representative Buddy Roemer of Bossier City in the open primary.

As a reward for his fealty to Edwards, the governor appointed Freeman's wife, Marianne, to the LSU Board of Supervisors in 1986.

On May 16, 2016, Freeman died from a ruptured aneurysm in Baton Rouge and his death was confirmed by his former press secretary Lester Duhe.

Party political offices
Preceded by Jimmy Fitzmorris	Democratic nominee for Lieutenant Governor of Louisiana; 1987	Succeeded by Melinda Schwegmann
Political offices
Preceded by Jimmy Fitzmorris	Lieutenant Governor of Louisiana; 1980–1988	Succeeded by Paul Hardy
