= 1979 Mississippi gubernatorial election =

- November 6, 1979
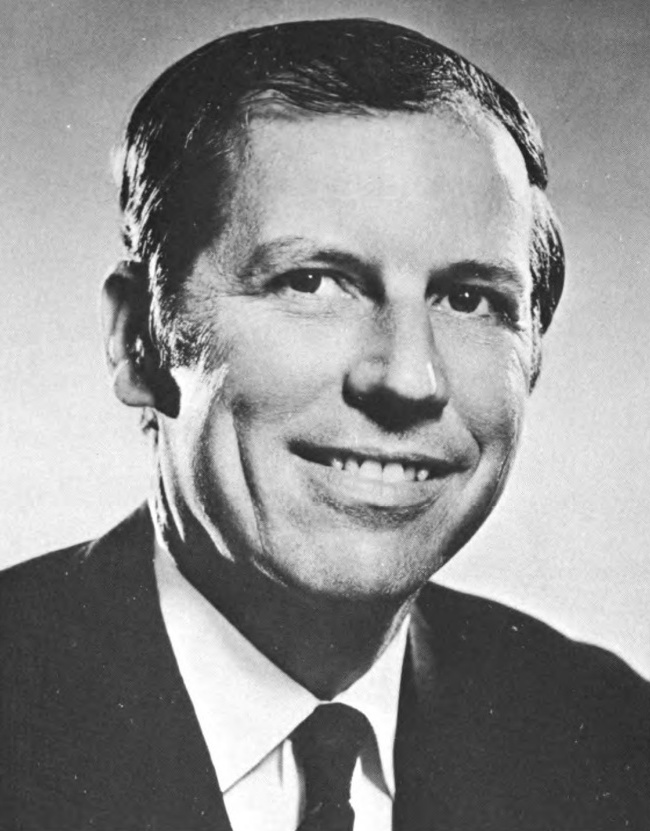

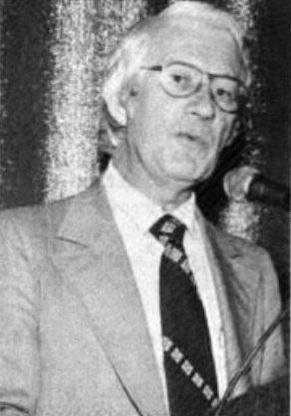
Nominee	William F. Winter	Gil Carmichael
Party	Democratic	Republican
Popular vote	413,620	263,702
Percentage	61.07%	38.93%
- County results Winter: 50–60% 60–70% 70–80% 80–90% Carmichael: 50–60%
Governor before election
Cliff Finch
Democratic
Elected Governor
William Winter
Democratic

The 1979 Mississippi gubernatorial election took place on November 6, 1979, in order to elect the Governor of Mississippi. Incumbent Democrat Cliff Finch was term-limited, and could not run for reelection to a second term. As of 2020, this was the most recent election in which a Democrat won over 60 percent of the statewide vote in a gubernatorial election in the state.

== Democratic primary ==
No candidate received a majority in the Democratic primary, which featured 6 contenders, so a runoff was held between the top two candidates. The runoff election was won by former Lieutenant Governor William Winter, who defeated Lieutenant Governor Evelyn Gandy.

=== Results ===
Mississippi Democratic gubernatorial primary, 1979
Party	Candidate	Votes	%
Democratic	Evelyn Gandy	224,746	30.49
Democratic	William Winter	183,944	24.25
Democratic	John Arthur Eaves	143,411	19.45
Democratic	Jim Herring	135,812	18.42
Democratic	Charles M. Deaton	34,700	4.71
Democratic	Richard Barrett	14,550	1.97
Total votes		737,163	100.00

=== Runoff ===
Mississippi Democratic gubernatorial primary runoff, 1979
Party	Candidate	Votes	%
Democratic	William Winter	386,174	56.62
Democratic	Evelyn Gandy	295,835	43.38
Total votes		682,009	100.00

== Republican primary ==
In the Republican primary, businessman and 1975 nominee Gil Carmichael defeated farmer and businessman Leon Bramlett.

=== Results ===
Mississippi Republican gubernatorial primary, 1979
Party	Candidate	Votes	%
Republican	Gil Carmichael	17,216	53.05
Republican	Leon Bramlett	15,236	46.95
Total votes		32,452	100.00

== General election ==
=== Results ===
Mississippi gubernatorial election, 1979
Party	Candidate	Votes	%
Democratic	William Winter	413,620	61.07
Republican	Gil Carmichael	263,702	38.93
Total votes		677,322	100.00
Democratic hold			
