= 1979 Louisiana gubernatorial election =

- October 27, 1979 (first round); December 8, 1979 (runoff)
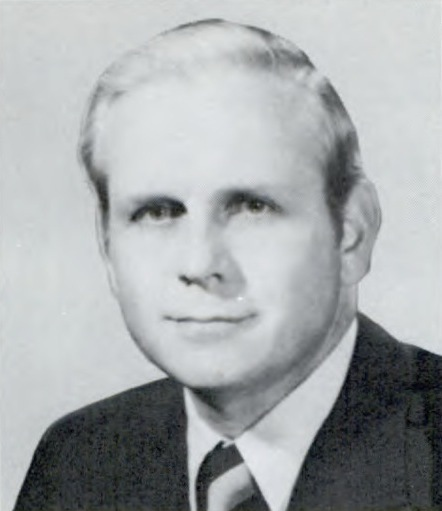

Candidate	Dave Treen	Louis Lambert	Jimmy Fitzmorris
Party	Republican	Democratic	Democratic
First round	297,674; 21.79%	283,266; 20.74%	280,760; 20.56%
Runoff	690,691; 50.35%	681,134; 49.65%	Eliminated
Candidate	Paul Hardy	E. L. Henry	Edgar G. "Sonny" Mouton, Jr.
Party	Democratic	Democratic	Democratic
First round	227,026; 16.62%	135,769; 9.94%	124,333; 9.10%
Runoff	Eliminated	Eliminated	Eliminated
- Treen: 20–30% 30–40% Lambert: 20–30% 30–40% 40–50% 50–60% 60–70% 70–80% Fitzmorris: 20–30% 30–40% 40–50% Hardy: 20–30% 30–40% 40–50% 50–60% Henry: 20–30% 30–40% 40–50% Mouton: 40–50% Treen: 50–60% 60–70% 70–80% Lambert: 50–60% 60–70% 70–80% 80–90%
Governor before election
Edwin Edwards
Democratic
Elected Governor
Dave Treen
Republican

The 1979 Louisiana gubernatorial election was held on December 8, 1979. Incumbent Governor Edwin Edwards was ineligible to run for a third term, making it the only gubernatorial election in Louisiana between 1972 and 1991 to not feature Edwards as a candidate. In the race to succeed him, Dave Treen narrowly defeated Louis Lambert to become the first Republican governor of Louisiana since the Reconstruction Era.

This was the second gubernatorial election held after the adoption of the Louisiana primary in 1975, and the first to require a runoff (officially called the general election). In the primary election held on October 27, Treen and Lambert finished first and second, respectively, to advance against a field of Democratic candidates including Lieutenant Governor Jimmy Fitzmorris, Secretary of State Paul Hardy, speaker of the Louisiana House E. L. Henry, and state senator Sonny Mouton.

== Background ==
Elections in Louisiana—with the exception of U.S. presidential elections—follow a variation of the open primary system called the jungle primary or the nonpartisan blanket primary. Candidates of any and all parties are listed on one ballot; voters need not limit themselves to the candidates of one party. Unless one candidate takes more than 50% of the vote in the first round, a run-off election is then held between the top two candidates, who may in fact be members of the same party. Texas uses this same format for its special elections. In this election, the first round of voting was held on October 27, 1979. The runoff was held on December 8, 1979.

== Primary election ==
=== Candidates ===
==== Democratic ====
- Jimmy Fitzmorris, Lieutenant Governor of Louisiana
- Paul Hardy, Secretary of State of Louisiana
- E. L. Henry, Speaker of the Louisiana House of Representatives
- Luther Devine "None of the Above" Knox
- Louis Lambert, chairman of the Louisiana Public Service Commission
- Ken "Cousin Ken" Lewis, perennial candidate
- Edgar G. "Sonny" Mouton Jr., State Senator from Lafayette

==== Republican ====
- Dave Treen, U.S. Representative from Metairie and Republican nominee for Governor in 1971-72

==== Socialist Workers ====
- Greg Nelson

=== Debates ===
- October 18, 1979

=== Results ===
On election night, the race for second place was too close to call between Lambert and Fitzmorris. Lambert declared victory the following Wednesday. Fitzmorris filed a lawsuit to contest the election, citing voting irregularities.

1979 Louisiana gubernatorial primary
Party	Candidate	Votes	%
Republican	David Treen	297,674	21.79%
Democratic	Louis Lambert	283,266	20.74%
Democratic	Jimmy Fitzmorris	280,760	20.56%
Democratic	Paul Hardy	227,026	16.62%
Democratic	E. L. Henry	135,769	9.94%
Democratic	Edgar G. "Sonny" Mouton, Jr.	124,333	9.10%
Democratic	L.D. Knox	6,327	0.46%
Democratic	Ken Lewis	5,942	0.44%
Socialist Workers	Greg Nelson	4,783	0.35%
Total votes		1,365,880	100.00%

== Runoff election ==
=== Campaign ===
Following the results of the first round, Henry and Mouton endorsed Treen. Lambert alleged that their endorsements had been secured in exchange for payment of their campaign debts; Henry, Mouton and Treen each denied the charge.

=== Debates ===
- November 15, 1979
- November 29, 1979

=== Results ===
1979 Louisiana gubernatorial runoff
Party	Candidate	Votes	%
Republican	David Treen	690,691	50.35%
Democratic	Louis Lambert	681,134	49.65%
Total votes		1,371,825	100.00%

== See also ==
- 1979 Louisiana lieutenant gubernatorial election

== Sources ==
State of Louisiana. Primary and General Election Returns, 1979.
