= 1980 United States elections =

- ← 1978 1979 1980 1981 1982 → Presidential election year
- Election day: November 4
- Incumbent president: ▌Jimmy Carter (D)
- Next Congress: 97th

Presidential election
- Partisan control: Republican gain
- Popular vote margin: Republican +9.7%
- Electoral vote
- Ronald Reagan (R): 489
- Jimmy Carter (D): 49
- 1980 presidential election results. Red denotes states won by Reagan, blue denotes states won by Carter. Numbers indicate the electoral votes won by each candidate.

Senate elections
- Overall control: Republican gain
- Seats contested: 34 of 100 seats
- Net seat change: Republican +12
- 1980 Senate results Democratic hold Republican gain Republican hold

House elections
- Overall control: Democratic hold
- Seats contested: All 435 voting members
- Popular vote margin: Democratic +2.6%
- Net seat change: Republican +34
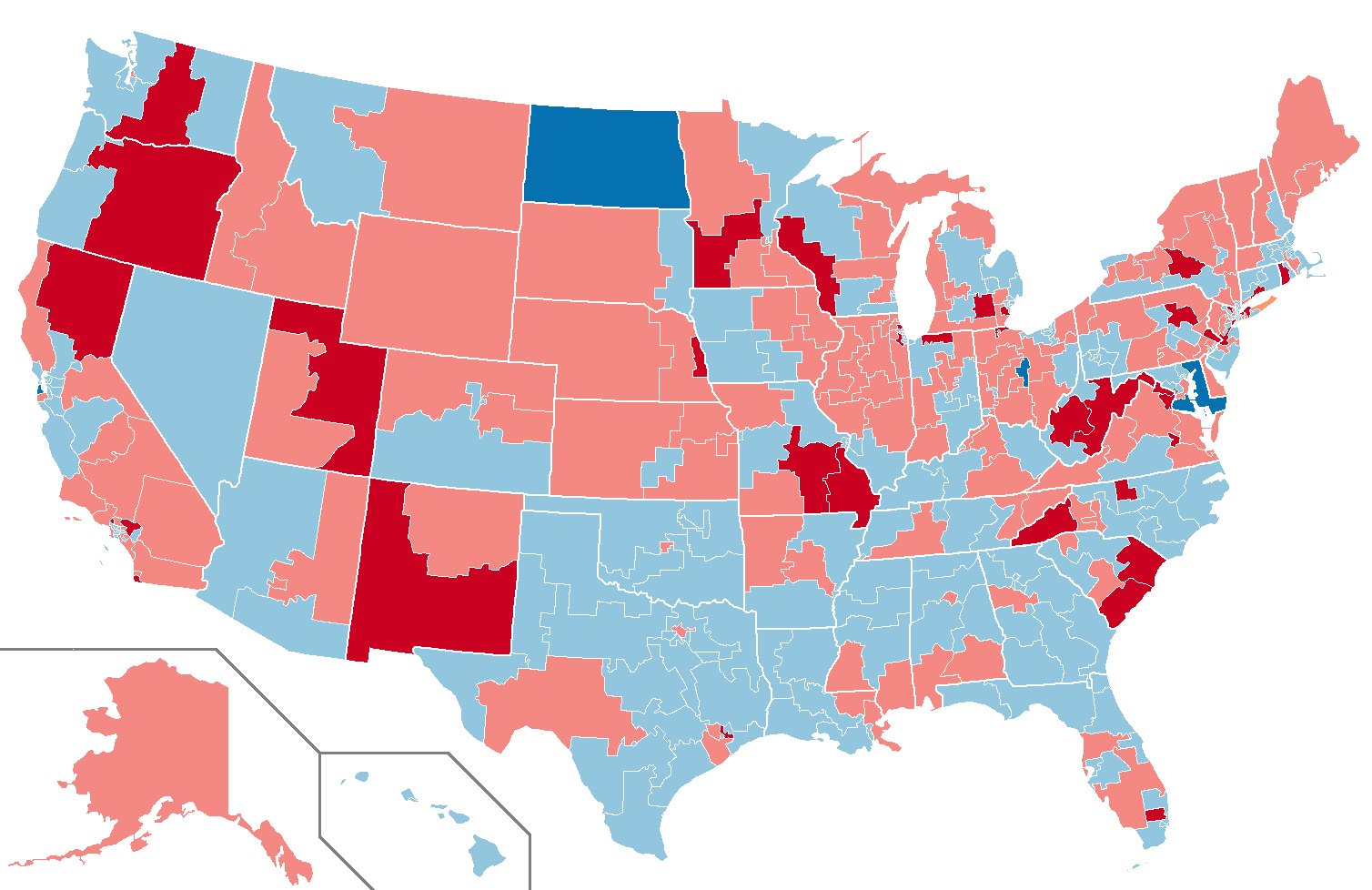
- 1980 House of Representatives results Democratic gain Democratic hold Republican gain Republican hold

Gubernatorial elections
- Seats contested: 15 (13 states, 2 territories)
- Net seat change: Republican +4
- 1980 gubernatorial election results Territorial races not shown Democratic hold Republican gain Republican hold

Elections were held on Tuesday, November 4, 1980. Republican presidential nominee Ronald Reagan defeated incumbent Democratic President Jimmy Carter in a landslide victory. Republicans picked up seats in both chambers of Congress and won control of the Senate, though Democrats retained a majority in the House of Representatives. The election is sometimes referred to as part of the "Reagan Revolution", a conservative realignment in U.S. politics. The election itself marked the start of the Reagan Era.

Reagan defeated George H. W. Bush and other candidates in the 1980 Republican presidential primaries, while Carter fended off a challenge from Senator Ted Kennedy in the 1980 Democratic primaries. In the general election, Reagan won 489 of 538 electoral votes and 50.7 percent of the popular vote, while Carter won 41.0 percent of the popular vote and independent candidate John B. Anderson took 6.6 percent of the vote.

Republicans picked up twelve Senate seats to take control of a chamber of Congress for the first time since the 1954 elections. They picked up 34 seats in the House, but Democrats retained a comfortable majority in that chamber. In the gubernatorial elections, Republicans won a net gain of four seats. This was the first presidential election since 1964 that the winning candidate had coattails in the House and Senate. This was the last election until 2020 when a chamber of Congress changed hands in a presidential election, and the first to do so since 1952. The 97th Congress was also the first since the 72nd Congress after the 1930 elections to have each house controlled by a different party.

This marks the most recent of four occasions where a newly elected president entered office with a divided legislature, which also occurred in 1860, 1876, and 1884. 1876 is the only other occasion where the president's party held the Senate, but not the House. A divided Congress also occurred after the 1984 and 2012 elections.

== Issues ==
=== Domestic issues ===
The United States in the 1970s underwent "stagflation"—a wrenching period of low economic growth, high inflation, and high interest rates and intermittent energy crises. These issues played a large role in the 1980 campaign.

While during Barry Goldwater's 1964 campaign, many voters saw his warnings about a too-powerful government as hyperbolic and only 30% of the electorate agreed that government was too powerful, by 1980 a majority of Americans believed that government held too much power.

=== Foreign issues ===
Events such as the Iran hostage crisis and the Soviet Invasion of Afghanistan played a large role in the 1980 elections. America was perceived by many to be weakening as a world power while the Soviet Union was perceived to be strengthening and expanding.

At the time, 60% of Americans polled felt that United States defense spending was too low.

== Federal elections ==
=== Presidential election ===
Republican Ronald Reagan won the election in a landslide, receiving 489 electoral votes, defeating incumbent Democrat Jimmy Carter, who received 49. Reagan received the highest number of electoral votes ever won by a non-incumbent presidential candidate.

Republican Congressman John B. Anderson, who ran as an independent, received 6.6% of the vote.

=== Congressional elections ===
==== Senate elections ====
The 34 seats of Class III of the United States Senate were up for election. Republicans won majority control of the Senate for the first time in 26 years, picking up 12 seats and losing none.

==== House of Representatives elections ====
Elections were held for all 435 seats in the United States House of Representatives. Though Democrats won the nationwide popular vote by 2.6 percentage points, Republicans gained 34 seats. Nonetheless, Democrats retained a majority with 243 seats, compared to 193 seats held by Republicans.

== State/territorial elections ==
=== Gubernatorial elections ===
Thirteen of the fifty state governorships were up for election. Four state governorships changed hands from Democrat to Republican.

The territorial governorships of American Samoa and Puerto Rico were also up for election.

== See also ==
- Reagan era
- Reagan coalition
- Reagan's coattails
- Boll weevil (politics)
