= 1979 Louisiana lieutenant gubernatorial election =

- October 27, 1979 (first round); December 8, 1979 (runoff)

Candidate	Robert Louis Freeman Sr.	Jim Donelon	Jesse Monroe Knowles
Party	Democratic	Democratic	Democratic
First round	546,837; 43.00%	328,907; 25.86%	283,256; 22.27%
Runoff	679,032; 51.66%	635,466; 48.34%	Eliminated
Lieutenant Governor before election
Jimmy Fitzmorris
Democratic
Elected Lieutenant Governor
Robert Louis Freeman Sr.
Democratic

The 1979 Louisiana lieutenant gubernatorial election was held on December 8, 1979, in order to elect the lieutenant governor of Louisiana. Democratic candidate and incumbent member of the Louisiana House of Representatives Robert Louis Freeman Sr. defeated fellow Democratic candidate Jim Donelon in the Runoff election.

== Background ==
This was the first lieutenant gubernatorial election held after the adoption of the Louisiana primary in 1978. Elections in Louisiana—with the exception of U.S. presidential elections—follow a variation of the open primary system called the jungle primary or the nonpartisan blanket primary. Candidates of any and all parties are listed on one ballot; voters need not limit themselves to the candidates of one party. Unless one candidate takes more than 50% of the vote in the first round, a run-off election is then held between the top two candidates, who may in fact be members of the same party. Texas uses this same format for its special elections. In this election, the first round of voting was held on October 27, 1979. The runoff was held on December 8, 1979.

== Primary election ==
On election day, October 27, 1979, Democratic candidates Robert Louis Freeman Sr. and Jim Donelon received the most votes and thus advanced to a runoff election on December 8.

=== Results ===
Louisiana lieutenant gubernatorial primary election, 1979
Party	Candidate	Votes	%
Democratic	Robert Louis Freeman Sr.	546,837	43.00
Democratic	Jim Donelon	328,907	25.86
Democratic	Jesse Monroe Knowles	283,256	22.27
Republican	R. C. Kiger II	46,847	3.68
Democratic	William Bowen	35,964	2.83
Democratic	Clyde Vidrine	20,444	1.61
Democratic	Lawrence Heaslip	9,581	0.75
Total votes		1,271,836	100.00

== Runoff election ==
On election day, December 8, 1979, Democratic candidate Robert Louis Freeman Sr. defeated fellow Democratic candidate Jim Donelon by a margin of 43,566 votes, thereby retaining Democratic control over the office of lieutenant governor. Freeman was sworn in as the 47th Lieutenant Governor of Louisiana on March 10, 1980.

=== Results ===
Louisiana lieutenant gubernatorial runoff election, 1979
Party	Candidate	Votes	%
Democratic	Robert Louis Freeman Sr.	679,032	51.66
Democratic	Jim Donelon	635,466	48.34
Total votes		1,314,498	100.00
Democratic hold			
