= 1978 United States elections =

- ← 1976 1977 1978 1979 1980 → Midterm elections
- Election day: November 7
- Incumbent president: ▌Jimmy Carter (D)
- Next Congress: 96th

Senate elections
- Overall control: Democratic hold
- Seats contested: 35 of 100 seats (33 seats of Class 2 + 2 special elections)
- Net seat change: Republican +3
- 1978 Senate election results Democratic gain Democratic hold Republican gain Republican hold

House elections
- Overall control: Democratic hold
- Seats contested: All 435 voting seats
- Popular vote margin: Democratic +8.9%
- Net seat change: Republican +15
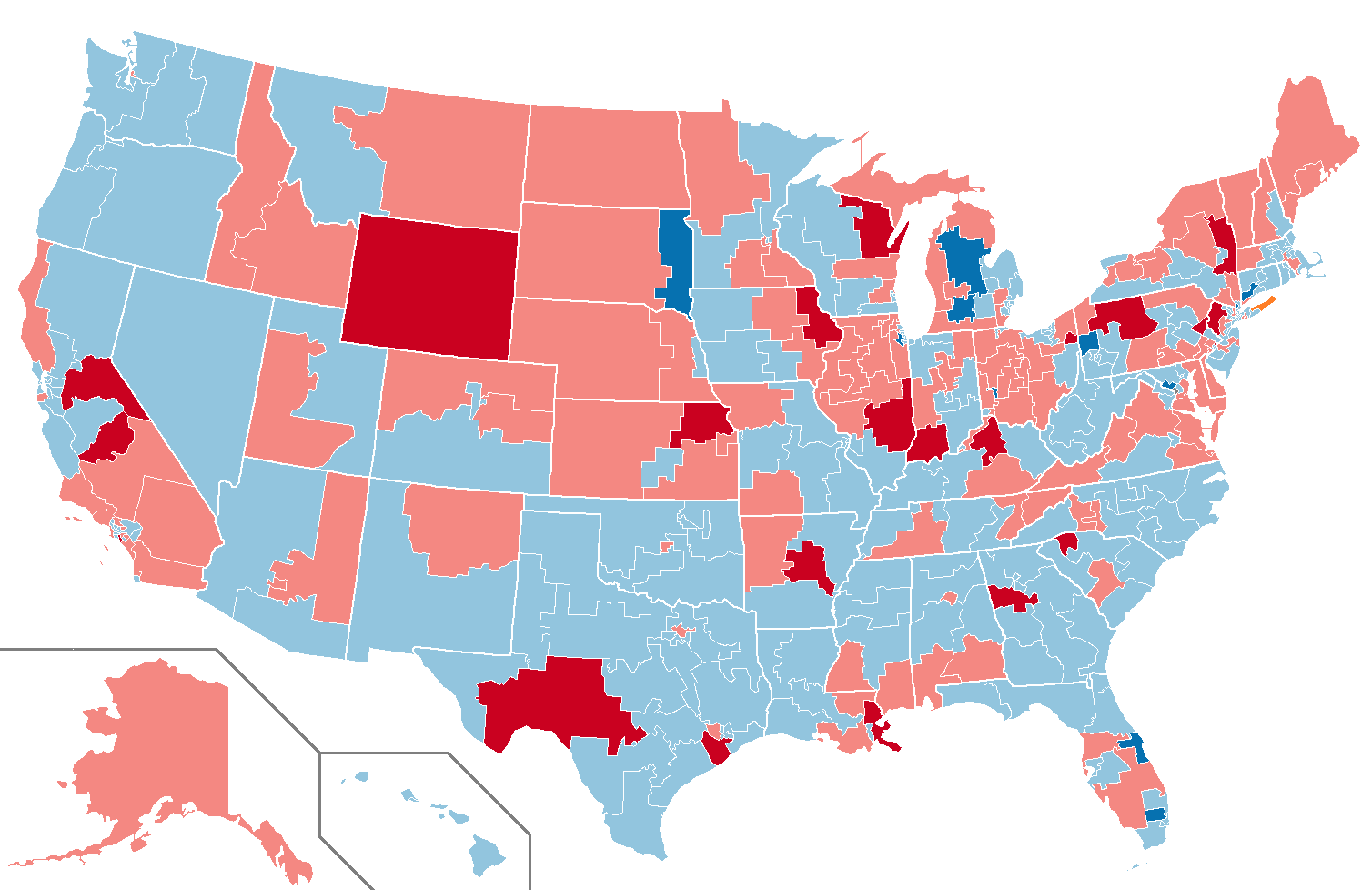
- 1978 House of Representatives election results Democratic gain Democratic hold Republican gain Republican hold

Gubernatorial elections
- Seats contested: 38 (36 states, 2 territories)
- Net seat change: Republican +6
- 1978 gubernatorial election results Territorial races not shown Democratic gain Democratic hold Republican gain Republican hold

Elections were held on November 7, 1978, to elect the members of the 96th United States Congress. The election occurred in the middle of Democratic President Jimmy Carter's term. Democrats retained control of both houses of Congress.

The Democrats lost three seats in the United States Senate to the Republicans. Democrats won the nationwide popular vote for the House of Representatives by a margin of 8.9 percentage points, but lost fifteen seats to Republicans. The elections represent the most recent instance in which the president's party retained control of both houses of Congress in a midterm election, although the 2002 elections saw Republicans retain the House and win control of the Senate.

In the gubernatorial elections, Republicans picked up six seats. Among the newly elected governors was future president Bill Clinton from Arkansas. Clinton's eventual successor as president, George W. Bush, ran as the Republican nominee in Texas's 19th congressional district but was defeated by Democrat Kent Hance, while future president Joe Biden was elected to his second term as senator from Delaware. Also, Georgia's 6th congressional district was flipped from Democratic to Republican by future House Speaker and one-time presidential candidate, Republican Newt Gingrich.

Though Republicans' gains were relatively modest for a midterm election, the election set the stage for the Reagan Revolution. Many of the newly elected members of Congress were more conservative than their predecessors, and most supported tax cuts that would eventually be implemented in the Economic Recovery Tax Act of 1981. The election also ended the possibility of a ratification of the SALT II treaty with the Soviet Union. Carter's move to the center after this election encouraged a 1980 Democratic primary challenge by Massachusetts Senator Ted Kennedy.

== See also ==
- 1978 United States House of Representatives elections
- 1978 United States Senate elections
- 1978 United States gubernatorial elections
