= Brad Dye =

American politician (1933–2018)

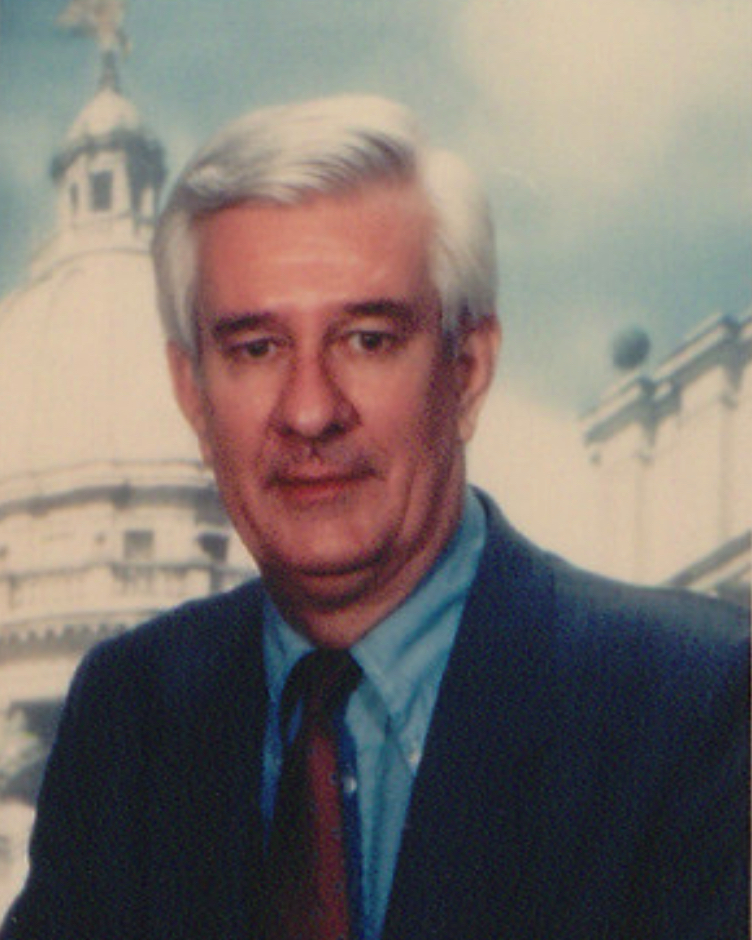

27th Lieutenant Governor of Mississippi
- In office January 16, 1980 – January 9, 1992
- Governor: William Winter; William Allain; Ray Mabus
- Preceded by: Evelyn Gandy
- Succeeded by: Eddie Briggs

47th State Treasurer of Mississippi
- In office January 18, 1972 – January 20, 1976
- Governor: Bill Waller
- Preceded by: Evelyn Gandy
- Succeeded by: Ed Pittman

Member of the Mississippi State Senate from the 31st district
- In office 1964–1968

Member of the Mississippi House of Representatives
- In office 1960–1964

Personal details
- Born: December 20, 1933 Charleston, Mississippi, U.S.
- Died: July 1, 2018 (aged 84) Ridgeland, Mississippi, U.S.
- Resting place: Charleston Cemetery; Charleston, Mississippi
- Party: Democratic
- Spouse: Donna Baile (m. 1963)
- Children: 3 sons
- Education: University of Mississippi (BA, JD)
- Profession: Lawyer

Bradford Johnson Dye Jr. (December 20, 1933 – July 1, 2018) was an American politician and lawyer who served as the 27th Lieutenant Governor of Mississippi from 1980 until 1992. Dye was the only individual in state history to have served as lieutenant governor for 12 consecutive years.

== Early life ==
Bradford Johnson Dye Jr. was born on December 20, 1933, in Charleston, Mississippi to Braford Johnson Dye and Maylise Dorgan Dye. His father was a state legislator. He received a Bachelor of Business Administration in 1957 from the University of Mississippi and a Juris Doctor degree in 1959 from the University of Mississippi School of Law. He married Donna Bess Bailey and had three children with her.

== Career ==
Dye was a conservative and a member of the Democratic Party. He began his political career in 1950 as a page in the U.S. House of Representatives for Jamie Whitten. He also worked as a driver for James Eastland during one of his U.S. Senate campaigns. He won election to the Mississippi House of Representatives in 1959, serving in that capacity from 1960 until 1964. He served in the Mississippi State Senate from 1964 to 1968. From 1961 to 1964 he worked as an attorney for the United States Senate Judiciary Committee, resigning to become a commissioner to the Workman's Compensation Commission. He directed the Mississippi Agricultural and Industrial Board from 1968 to 1971. He was a segregationist in the 1960s and in 1967 served as gubernatorial candidate John Bell Williams' campaign manager.

Dye served as Mississippi State Treasurer from 1972 to 1976. In 1975 he ran for the office of Lieutenant Governor of Mississippi. He entered a runoff in the Democratic primary with Evelyn Gandy and lost. He was president of Jackson Savings and Loan Association from 1976 to 1979.

=== Lieutenant governor ===
Dye was elected lieutenant governor in 1979. By then, he decided to "make his peace with integration, hiring African Americans onto his staff as lieutenant governor." He was sworn in on January 16, 1980. In office he had the power to appoint members to Senate committees. Unlike his predecessors, he was keen to place senators of certain political persuasions on committees in such a fashion as to advance his own legislative agenda. He also convinced the Senate to let him chair the body's Rules Committee.

In December 1982 Governor William F. Winter called the legislature into special session to consider the adoption of an expansive education reform program. Dye was not initially a strong supporter of the bill, but decided that the Senate should approve the measure—including the creation of public kindergartens—after the House approved it. He feared that Senate Finance Committee Chairman Ellis B. Bodron would block the bill's passage. The night the reform legislation passed the House, Dye called Bodron and told him, "Ellis, what you do with your politics is fine, but in running your mouth, you've hurt my politics. I want you to add some Senate things to the House bill." When Bodron asked for clarification, Dye told him "I want a commitment out of you right now—that this bill is going to come out of Finance Committee and you'll support it. If you're not, this is going to be the first time the Education Committee has ever raised taxes in this state." Bodron acquiesced to Dye's request, and the reform bill was ultimately passed into law. Dye remained generally supportive of education reform but was accused by journalists of blocking other reform legislation.

In 1983, Dye won his second term as lieutenant governor by defeating Republican Gil Carmichael, an auto dealer from Meridian who ran as an independent. In 1987, Dye won re-election to a third consecutive four-year term in office. In 1986 a commission studying the state's constitution affirmed Dye's perspective on the powers of the lieutenant governor's office.

In 1991 Dye was challenged in the Democratic primary by state senator Ken Harper, accused him of creating "gridlock" over reform legislation affecting ballot initiatives, referendums, and limits on lobbying. Dye shortly thereafter declared his support for these reforms in a speech at the Neshoba County Fair, but this action was viewed as opportunistic by many voters. In televisions attack ads, Harper criticized Dye for using $850 of public funds to acquire a new office chair while supporting a tax hike. Dye countered by accusing Harper of improperly using his office for private gain by performing legal services for three state bodies. While his opponent garnered the support of labor unions and the state teacher association, Dye was narrowly re-nominated, earning 51.5 percent of the vote in the Democratic primary.

In the general election Dye faced Republican state senator Eddie Briggs, a former Democrat who faced no primary challenge, and black independent Henry J. Kirksey. Briggs characterized Dye as beholden to "the tired, old, worn politic of the past" and denounced him for failing to pass reform legislation. He also attacked him for refusing to release his tax returns, participate in a public debate, and for collecting the governor's salary while serving as acting governor whenever the incumbent was out of the state. Briggs ultimately won with 49.5 percent of the vote. Dye collected 41.5 percent, and Kirksey earned the remainder. The Mississippi constitution stipulated that a statewide race not won by outright majority was to be decided by a vote of the House. Dye encouraged the House to affirm Briggs' victory on the basis that he earned a plurality of the votes. Briggs replaced him on January 9, 1992.

Dye was the longest-serving lieutenant governor in Mississippian history. Unlike many of his predecessors and most of his successors, he did not view the office as a platform from which to run for gubernatorial office. Changes were later instituted which placed a two-term limit on the lieutenant governor's office.

== Later life and death ==
In the 2007 Mississippi gubernatorial election, Dye endorsed Republican candidate Haley Barbour, who was ultimately victorious. In September 2010 he was presented with the Mississippi Medal of Service by Governor Barbour.

Dye died of respiratory failure on July 1, 2018, at a hospice in Ridgeland, Mississippi.

== Works cited ==
- Bolton, Charles C. (2013). William F. Winter and the New Mississippi: A Biography. Jackson: University Press of Mississippi. ISBN 978-1-61703-787-0.
- Brown, Victoria L.; Fendley, Seth; Fuderburk, Casey Malone Maugh (2017). "A Mississippi Woman of First: The Legacy of Edythe Evelyn Gandy". Mississippi Law Journal. 86 (4): 811–832.
- Bullock, Charles S.; Rozell, Mark J., eds. (2010). The New Politics of the Old South: An Introduction to Southern Politics. Rowman & Littlefield. ISBN 9780742570214.
- Krane, Dale; Shaffer, Stephen D. (1992). Mississippi Government and Politics: Modernizers Versus Traditionalists. University of Nebraska Press. ISBN 9780803277588.
- Lamis, Alexander P., ed. (1999). Southern Politics in the 1990s. Louisiana State University Press. ISBN 9780807166765.
- Mississippi Official and Statistical Register 1980–1984. Jackson: Mississippi Secretary of State. 1981. OCLC 1131544573.
- Nash, Jere; Taggart, Andy (2009). Mississippi Politics: The Struggle for Power, 1976-2008 (second ed.). University Press of Mississippi. ISBN 9781604733570.

Party political offices
Preceded by Evelyn Gandy	Democratic nominee for Lieutenant Governor of Mississippi; 1979, 1983, 1987, 1991	Succeeded by Ronnie Musgrove
Political offices
Preceded by Evelyn Gandy	Treasurer of Mississippi; 1972–1976	Succeeded by Ed Pittman
Preceded by Evelyn Gandy	Lieutenant Governor of Mississippi; 1980–1992	Succeeded by Eddie Briggs
