= Lunch pail Democrat =

Term for blue-collar Democratic Party members

In United States politics, the term lunch pail Democrat, lunchbox Democrat, or lunchbucket Democrat refers to members of the Democratic Party of a "blue collar" or working-class background, as well as politicians who share or attempt to leverage this background through populist appeals. Laurence Collins of The Boston Globe summarized the term as "a label that connotes an absence of lofty philosophical concerns in favor of a concern for people's more basic needs".

The term lunchpail is also used more broadly as a metaphor for the working class, and in addition to Democrat is paired with other terms, such as lunch pail liberal or lunch pail socialism.

== History ==
The Oxford Dictionary of American Political Slang notes the term "lunch-pailers" being used to refer to laborers in a political context as early as 1958, and "lunch-pail liberals and Progressive Democrats" used in 1992.

== Politicians ==
Among the traits associated with lunch-pail Democratic politicians are:

- Support for full employment even at the risk of deficit spending
- Populist appeals to working-class and lower middle class families

== Applications ==
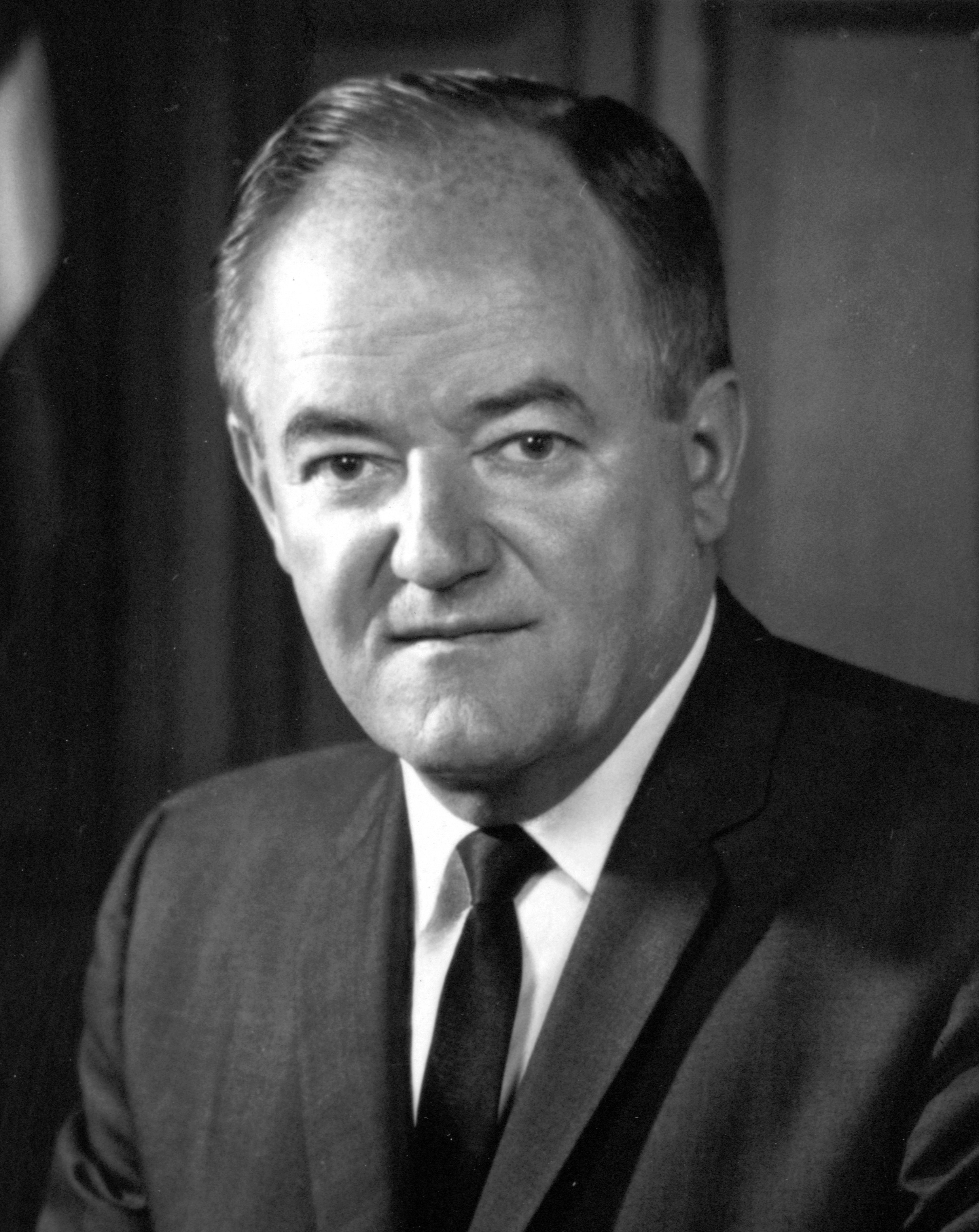
Hubert Humphrey

- Hubert Humphrey was described as the "last of the lunch-pail Democrats" in 1982 by New York magazine.
- Al Gore's efforts during his 1992 campaign have been described as: "determined to cast himself as an old school, labor lunch-pail Democrat in the tradition of Hubert Humphey and Walter Mondale. This strategy was problematic in a number of ways, not least because it wasn't particularly convincing."
- Democratic politician and eventual 56th governor of Mississippi, Cliff Finch used the emblem of a lunch-pail with his name upon it in his campaigns.
- During the 2008 Presidential primaries, Hillary Clinton was described as "transforming herself into a white lunch-pail populist, knocking back whiskey shots in Indiana."
- Spiro Agnew was described as "Nixon's ambassador to the lower middle class, to the blue-collar American — the people who voted Democratic in the past, the people we used to call lunch-pail Democrats."
