= 1975 Mississippi gubernatorial election =

- November 5, 1975
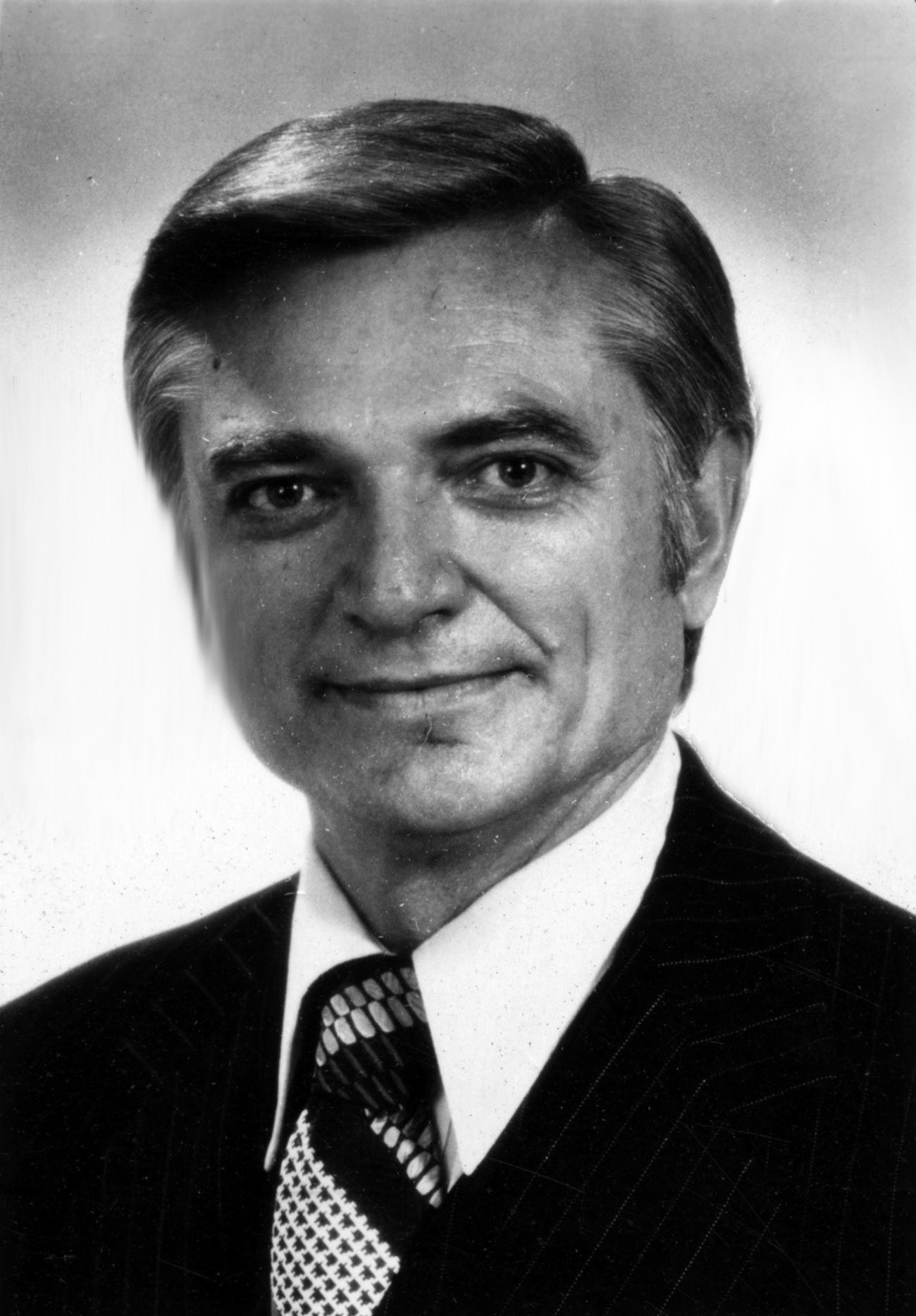

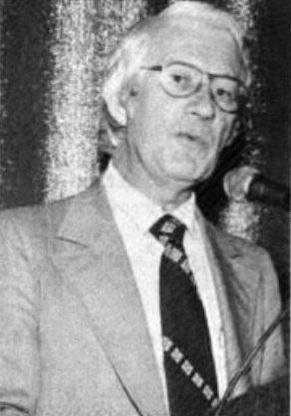
Nominee	Cliff Finch	Gil Carmichael
Party	Democratic	Republican
Popular vote	369,568	319,632
Percentage	52.19%	45.14%
- County results Finch: 40–50% 50–60% 60–70% 70–80% 80–90% Carmichael: 40–50% 50–60% 60–70%
Governor before election
Bill Waller
Democratic
Elected Governor
Cliff Finch
Democratic

The 1975 Mississippi gubernatorial election took place on November 5, 1975, in order to elect the Governor of Mississippi. Incumbent Democrat Bill Waller was term-limited, and could not run for reelection to a second term. To date, this was the last time Washington County voted for the Republican candidate.

== Democratic primary ==
No candidate received a majority in the Democratic primary, which featured 6 contenders, so a runoff was held between the top two candidates. The runoff election was won by former state representative Cliff Finch, who defeated Lieutenant Governor William Winter.

=== Results ===
Mississippi Democratic gubernatorial primary, 1975
Party	Candidate	Votes	%
Democratic	William Winter	286,652	36.29
Democratic	Cliff Finch	253,829	32.14
Democratic	Maurice Dantin	179,472	22.72
Democratic	John Arthur Eaves	50,606	6.41
Democratic	Leman Gandy	11,966	1.52
Democratic	David Perkins	7,369	0.93
Total votes		789,894	100.00

=== Runoff ===
Mississippi Democratic gubernatorial primary runoff, 1975
Party	Candidate	Votes	%
Democratic	Cliff Finch	442,865	57.69
Democratic	William Winter	324,749	42.31
Total votes		767,614	100.00

== General election ==
=== Campaign ===
During the campaign, Finch forged a coalition of African American and working class white voters in a populist-style gubernatorial campaign, adopted the campaign slogan "The working man's friend". This campaign tactic proved popular as Finch was elected over Republican nominee Gil Carmichael and the African American independent candidate Henry Kirksey. Carmichael did, however, draw 45 percent of the vote, an exceptionally high figure for a statewide Republican candidate at that time.

=== Results ===
Mississippi gubernatorial election, 1975
Party	Candidate	Votes	%
Democratic	Cliff Finch	369,568	52.19
Republican	Gil Carmichael	319,632	45.14
Independent	Henry Jay Kirksey	18,883	2.67
Total votes		708,083	100.00
Democratic hold			

== Analysis ==
Historian David Sansing described Mississippi's 1975 gubernatorial election as "one of the most unusual in the state's history".

== Works cited ==
- Sansing, David G. (2016). Mississippi Governors: Soldiers, Statesmen, Scholars, Scoundrels (first ed.). Oxford: Nautilus Publishing Company. ISBN 978-1-936946-81-5.
