= Gil Carmichael =

American businessman and politician (1927–2016)

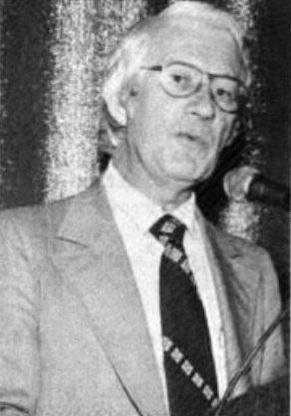
- Carmichael in 1974
- Born: June 27, 1927; Columbia, Mississippi, U.S.
- Died: January 31, 2016 (aged 88); Meridian, Mississippi, U.S.
- Political party: Republican

Gilbert Ellzey Carmichael (June 27, 1927 – January 31, 2016) was an American businessman and politician. Born in Columbia, Mississippi, he attended Texas A&M University and served in the United States Coast Guard during the Korean War, earning a Silver Lifesaving Medal for helping rescue crewmen from a sinking tanker. In June 1950 Carmichael was hired by the Dow Jones & Company to sell its newspaper, The Wall Street Journal. After eight years, he joined a friend in distributing cars in Shreveport, Louisiana. He later became a partner in a car dealership in Meridian, Mississippi, before taking over the business. A member of the Republican Party, he became involved in politics in the 1960s, making two unsuccessful bids for a seat in the Mississippi State Legislature. Carmichael also ran for a U.S. Senate seat in 1972 and in 1975 ran for the office of Governor of Mississippi, the first serious Republican contender for the post in decades. He lost a narrow race and made another unsuccessful bid in 1979. He also launched an unsuccessful independent campaign in 1983 to be elected Lieutenant Governor of Mississippi. From the 1970s to the 1990s he served on various national transportation advisory boards. He died in 2016.

== Early life and business career ==
Gilbert Ellzey Carmichael was born on June 27, 1927, in Columbia, Mississippi, United States to Calvin Ellzey Carmichael and Clyde Myrna Smith Carmichael. His father died when he was young, forcing his mother to provide for the family. He graduated from Columbia High School in 1944, served in the United States Military from 1945 to 1946. He thereafter attended Texas A&M University, where he graduated in 1950 with a business degree and a minor in petroleum engineering. He married and had a son. Carmichael was commissioned as an officer in the United States Coast Guard during the Korean War. While serving at the rank of ensign in 1952, he participated in the rescue of crewmen from the sinking tanker SS Fort Mercer off the coast of Cape Cod, when the ship broke apart in a storm. He commanded a boat which retrieved two men off of the ship's bow, and for his efforts was awarded a Silver Lifesaving Medal for "heroic action".

In June 1950, Carmichael was hired by the Dow Jones & Company to sell its newspaper, The Wall Street Journal. Assigned to a distribution area comprising southern Mississippi, southern Louisiana, and the city of New Orleans, he would go door-to-door in office buildings and pitch the paper and teach potential customers how it should be read. After eight years, he joined a friend in distributing Fiat cars in Shreveport, Louisiana. He later became a partner in a car dealership in Meridian, Mississippi, before buying out the entire business. He established a Volkswagen dealership in 1961 and later expanded to sell Audi and Mercedes vehicles. He also acquired dealerships in Tuscaloosa, Alabama. He sold his dealerships in Meridian upon his appointment to the Federal Railroad Administration, but retained their buildings and later used them as he became involved in his son's commercial real estate company, Missouth Properties.

== Political career ==
=== 1972 U.S. Senate election ===
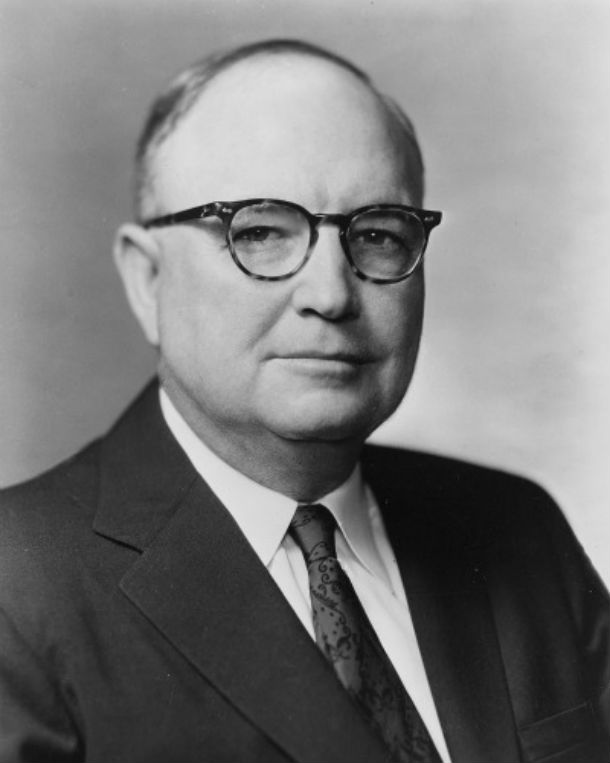
Incumbent Democratic Senator James Eastland, Carmichael's opponent when he ran for senate in 1972

Carmichael was a member of the Republican Party. He became involved in politics in the 1960s, making two unsuccessful bids for a seat in the Mississippi State Legislature and chairing Rubel Phillips's 1963 gubernatorial campaign organization in Lauderdale County. In 1971 he considered running for the office of Lieutenant Governor of Mississippi, but was convinced not to by Republican leaders who were fearful that his bid would associate the Republican Party with the gubernatorial campaign of black independent Charles Evers. In 1972 black civil rights activist James Meredith declared himself a candidate for the Republican nomination to contest the U.S. Senate seat held by Democrat James Eastland. A group of Mississippi Republicans felt that Meredith was not a strong enough contender and did not want the party to become associated with another black candidate, and recruited Carmichael to run instead. He won the Republican primary election, but faced opposition in his bid from national Republicans. President Richard Nixon, though a Republican, wanted to maintain good relations with Eastland so as to ease his political interests in the federal government. A Nixon campaign official visited Carmichael and told him that if he withdrew from the race, Nixon would appoint him as an ambassador. Carmichael refused. When Vice President Spiro Agnew traveled to Mississippi to host a rally, he was instructed to specifically not invite Carmichael. This action backfired, as the press learned of the maneuvering and covered Carmichael as an underdog. Carmichael ultimately lost the general election to Eastland, taking only 39 percent of the vote.

=== Gubernatorial campaigns ===
In 1975, Carmichael declared his candidacy for the office of Governor of Mississippi. He was the first serious Republican candidate for gubernatorial office in decades. In the general election he faced Democrat Cliff Finch. A black politician, Henry J. Kirksey, also ran as an independent. Finch largely ignored his opponents and espoused vague rhetoric. Carmichael offered specific proposals and stances. He supported the creation of a new state constitution, the ratification of the Equal Rights Amendment, the supply of federal financial aid to New York City, gun registration, reduced penalties for marijuana possession, and mandatory school attendance for children. He believed that the Republican Party should be biracial, arguing that it was "the party of emancipation, the party of homeownership, the party of individual responsibility [...] the natural party for black people to be involved in." Thus he attempted to appeal to black voters, placing black politician Robert G. Clark Jr. on his campaign strategy committee and visiting the all-black community of Mound Bayou; these entreaties had minimal impact. Carmichael ultimately lost but drew 47 percent of the vote, a high figure for a statewide Republican candidate at that time. His largest support came from urban and suburban areas. Many Republicans felt he had staked out positions viewed as too liberal by Mississippians and would have won the election otherwise. He served as a delegate at the 1976 Republican National Convention and backed Gerald Ford's candidacy. The convention revealed significant conservative-moderate divisions in the party as well as disagreement over race, and Carmichael declared that he wanted to ensure that the party would not become "lily white and hard right".

Carmichael decided to run for governor again in 1979. Finch's administration had been plagued by corruption scandals, and he hoped to exude a moderate and professional image which Mississippians would find attractive. More conservative Mississippi Republicans who blamed Carmichael for losing the 1975 race thought he should not run again and recruited another candidate for the Republican primary, Leon Bramlett. Bramlett styled himself as the "conservative alternative" to Carmichael. Carmichael ultimately had better name recognition and prevailed in the primary, taking 17,216 votes to his opponent's 15,236. Long-time politician William F. Winter won the Democratic primary to Carmichael's dismay; the two men exuded similar images, but Winter had more experience in government. Harmed by his divisive primary, Carmichael trailed Winter in polls and lost the general election, carrying a majority of the votes in only three counties. The moderate wing of the Mississippi Republican Party declined after his loss, as well as the party's attempts to secure black support. In 1983, Carmichael ran for the office of lieutenant governor as an independent. Making an appeal to rewrite the state constitution the centerpiece of his campaign, he took only 35.7 percent of the vote, losing to Brad Dye. In 1998 he delivered a series of speeches calling for the state of Mississippi to redraft its constitution. He also advocated changing the Mississippi state flag later in his life.

== Later life and death ==
In 1973 Carmichael was appointed to the National Highway Safety Advisory Committee as a consolation for the Nixon administration's lack of support for him in the 1972 Senate race. He became its chairman before being made the federal commissioner for the National Transportation Policy Study Commission in 1976. He left the job in 1979. Carmichael worked in the Federal Railroad Administration from 1989 to 1993 and strongly supported intermodal freight transport. He created the Transportation Institute at the University of Denver in 1996. In 1998 he was appointed to the Amtrak Reform Council. He was made chairman the following year and left the council in mid-2002. The body produced recommendations to U.S. Congress on ways to improve the financial viability of Amtrak. From 1993 to 2002 he wrote a column for Progressive Railroading. Carmichael died of a heart attack at Anderson Regional Medical Center in Meridian, Mississippi on January 31, 2016. A funeral was held for him at St. Paul's Episcopal Church in Meridian on February 5.

Party political offices
| Preceded by Prentiss Walker | Republican nominee for U.S. Senator from Mississippi (Class 2); 1972 | Succeeded by Thad Cochran |
| Vacant Title last held by Rubel Phillips | Republican nominee for Governor of Mississippi; 1975, 1979 | Succeeded by Leon Bramlett |
