= 1981 United States elections =

- ← 1979 1980 1981 1982 1983 → Off-year elections
- Election day: November 3

Congressional special elections
- Seats contested: 5
- Net seat change: Democrat +1

Gubernatorial elections
- Seats contested: 2
- Net seat change: 0
- 1981 gubernatorial election results map

Legend
- Republican gain Democratic gain No election

Elections were held on Tuesday, November 3, 1981, comprising 2 gubernatorial races, 5 congressional special elections, and a plethora of other local elections across the United States. No Senate special elections were held.

== Federal elections ==
=== United States House of Representatives special elections ===
In 1981, five special elections were held to fill vacancies to the 97th United States Congress. They were for Michigan's 4th congressional district, Maryland's 5th congressional district, Ohio's 4th congressional district, Mississippi's 4th congressional district, and Pennsylvania's 3rd congressional district.

District	Date	Predecessor	Winner	Cause of vacancy
Michigan 4	April 21, 1981	David Stockman	Mark D. Siljander	Resigned January 27, 1981, to become Director of the Office of Management and Budget.
Maryland 5	May 19, 1981	Gladys Spellman	Steny Hoyer	Incapacitated since last Congress and seat declared vacant February 24, 1981.
Ohio 4	June 25, 1981	Tennyson Guyer	Mike Oxley	Died April 12, 1981.
Mississippi 4	July 7, 1981	Jon Hinson	Wayne Dowdy	Resigned April 13, 1981.
Pennsylvania 3	July 21, 1981	Raymond F. Lederer	Joseph F. Smith	Convicted of bribery in the Abscam sting operation, resigned.

== State and local elections ==
Several statewide elections were held this year, most notably the gubernatorial elections in two U.S. States.

=== Gubernatorial elections ===
Two gubernatorial elections were held in 1981 in New Jersey and the Commonwealth of Virginia and both states flipped parties.

State	Incumbent	Party	Result	Opposing candidates
New Jersey	Brendan Byrne	Democratic	Term-limited, Republican victory	Thomas Kean (Republican) 49.5% James Florio (Democratic) 49.4%
Virginia	John N. Dalton	Republican	Term-limited, Democratic victory	Chuck Robb (Democratic) 53.6% Marshall Coleman (Republican) 46.4%

Note: Candidates' vote percentages are rounded to the nearest tenth of one percent. Candidates earning 0.05% or more of the vote are included.

=== Legislative ===
Elections took place in the New Jersey Senate and Virginia House of Delegates. The Democrats maintained control of the New Jersey Senate but lost 2 seats. In Virginia, Democrats maintained control of the House of Delegates but lost 8 seats.
