= Prentiss Walker =

Mississippi farmer and congressman (1917–1998)

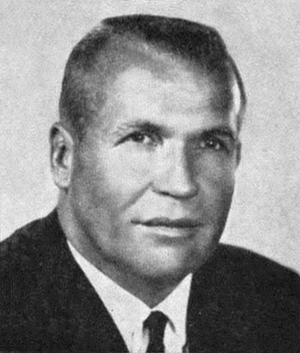

Member of the U.S. House of Representatives from Mississippi's 4th district
- In office January 3, 1965 – January 3, 1967
- Preceded by: W. Arthur Winstead
- Succeeded by: Gillespie V. Montgomery

Personal details
- Born: Prentiss Lafayette Walker; August 23, 1917 Taylorsville, Mississippi, U.S.
- Died: June 5, 1998 (aged 80) Magee, Mississippi, U.S.
- Resting place: Zion Hill Missionary Baptist Church Cemetery, Mize, Mississippi
- Party: Republican
- Spouse: Dimple Howell Walker
- Children: Treta Walker Butler; Jan Walker Magee
- Education: Mississippi College
- Occupation: Farmer

Military service
- Branch/service: United States Army
- Battles/wars: World War II

Prentiss Lafayette Walker (August 23, 1917 – June 5, 1998) was an American farmer, businessman, and politician from Mississippi. A staunch segregationist, in 1964 he became the first Republican to be elected to the United States House of Representatives from Mississippi during the twentieth century.

== Early life ==
Walker was born in Taylorsville, Mississippi. He attended public schools in Taylorsville, Mize, and Las Cruces, New Mexico. In 1936, he attended Mississippi College in Clinton.

During World War II, he served in the US Army in the Pacific Theater of Operations. Then, he returned to his previous work as a chicken farmer in Smith County and became president of Walker Egg Farms, Inc., based in Mize. From 1937 to 1963, he was the owner of Walker's Supermarket. In 1960, Walker served on the executive committee of the Mississippi Game and Fish Commission under Governor Ross Barnett.

== Political career ==
In 1964, Walker was a delegate to the Republican National Convention, which met in San Francisco, California, and he ran as a Republican in Mississippi's 4th congressional district, in the central eastern part of the state. He unseated 11-term incumbent W. Arthur Winstead by some 7,000 votes, an 11% margin, the first Republican breakthrough in Mississippi since Elza Jeffords served a term in Congress from 1883 to 1885.

Walker's victory was made possible by two factors. The first was white Mississippians' anger at the national Democratic Party's support for civil rights, which pushed many registered Democrats to vote for Barry Goldwater, who carried Mississippi in the 1964 presidential election with 87 percent of the vote.

The second was widespread suppression of African Americans' right to vote. Only 6.7 percent of eligible Black Mississippians were registered to vote in 1964. In Walker's Congressional district, Goldwater won many of the counties with greater than ninety percent of the vote; two, Holmes and Noxubee, gave him a staggering 96.6 percent, tied for his best showing in the nation, and one which has never since been equalled by any presidential candidate in any county nationwide.

After winning the election, Walker's first public appearance was to speak at a meeting organized by the group Americans for the Preservation of the White Race.

At a Republican fundraiser at the Mississippi Coliseum in the capital city of Jackson on June 20, 1983, US President Ronald Reagan would tell the following anecdote:

Former Congressman Prentiss Walker, who is here today, tells a story about his first campaign. He dropped in on a farm and introduced himself as a Republican candidate. And as he tells it, the farmer's eyes lit up, and then he said, "Wait till I get my wife. We've never seen a Republican before."

And a few minutes later he was back with his wife, and they asked Prentiss if he wouldn't give them a speech. Well, he looked around for kind of a podium, something to stand on, and then the only thing available was a pile of that stuff that the late Mrs. Truman said it had taken her thirty-five years to get Harry to call "fertilizer."

So, he stepped up on that and made his speech. And apparently he won them over. And they told him it was the first time they'd ever heard a Republican. And he says, "That's okay. That's the first time I've ever given a speech from a Democratic platform."

Walker relinquished his House seat after only one term. He instead challenged U.S. Senator James Eastland. He ran well to Eastland's right even criticizing the veteran senator of being too friendly with US President Lyndon Johnson and not being tough enough to block integration-friendly judges in his position as chairman of the Senate Judiciary Committee.

With 105,652 votes, Walker polled 26.7 percent at the general election. His supporters included blacks in southwestern Mississippi, which came as a surprise because of Walker's open support for segregation. Black voters had entered the political process under the Voting Rights Act of 1965 and carried Claiborne and Jefferson Counties for Walker in protest of Eastland as a "Democratic Regular."

Years later, Wirt Yerger, the chairman of the Mississippi Republican Party in the 1960s, noted that Walker's decision to relinquish his House seat after one term for the vagaries of a Senate race against the powerful Eastland was "very devastating" to the growth of the Republican Party in Mississippi.

In 1966, state Representative Lewis McAllister of Meridian, the first Republican elected to the Mississippi House of Representatives since Reconstruction, sought to hold Walker's House seat for the Republican, but victory went to fellow State Representative Gillespie V. "Sonny" Montgomery, also of Meridian, who held the seat for 30 years. Walker tried to unseat Montgomery in 1968 but got only thirty percent of the vote. When Walker again ran for the Senate against Eastland in 1972, as an Independent, rather than a Republican, he drew only 14,662 votes (2.3 percent). The Rockefeller-style Republican Gil Carmichael, a former critic of Walker, trailed with 249,779 votes (38.7 percent), as Eastland won handily with 375,102 votes or 58.1 percent.

== Private life ==
Walker and his wife, the former Dimple Howell, had two daughters, Treta Walker Butler and husband James of Mize and Jan Walker Magee of Magee. Prentiss and Dimple Walker are interred in Mize at Zion Hill Missionary Baptist Church Cemetery.

== Legacy ==
Prentiss Walker Lake (originally called Ross Barnett Lake) near Mize is named in his honor.

== Sources ==
- "G.O.P. Threatened in South by Loss of Backlash Vote," October 9, 1966; ProQuest Historical Newspapers, The New York Times (1851 – 2003)

Party political offices
Preceded by Joe Moore	Republican nominee for United States Senator from Mississippi (Class 2); 1966	Succeeded by Gil Carmichael
U.S. House of Representatives
Preceded by W. Arthur Winstead	Member of the U.S. House of Representatives from Mississippi's 4th congressional district 1965–1967	Succeeded by Sonny Montgomery
