= 1966 United States Senate election in Mississippi =

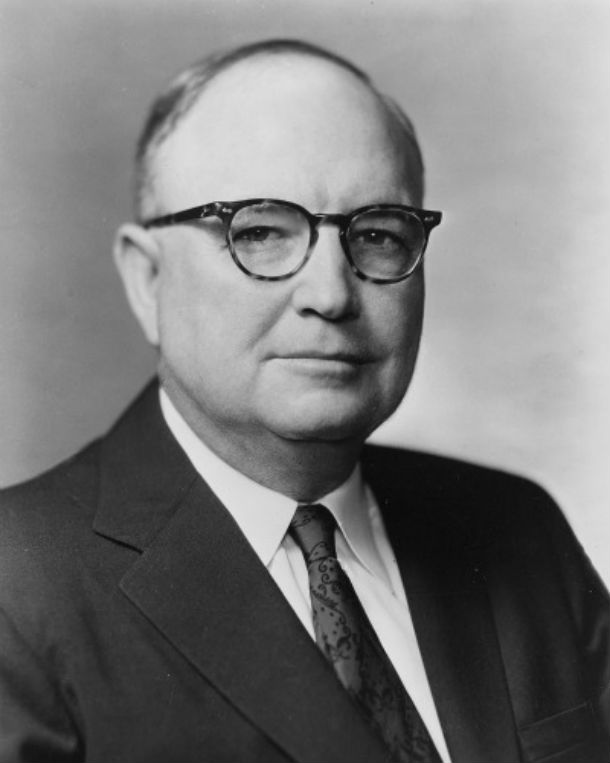

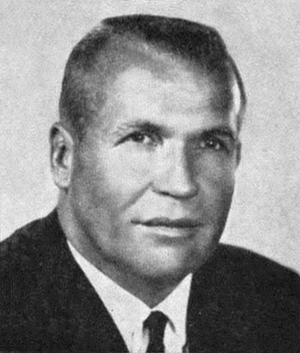

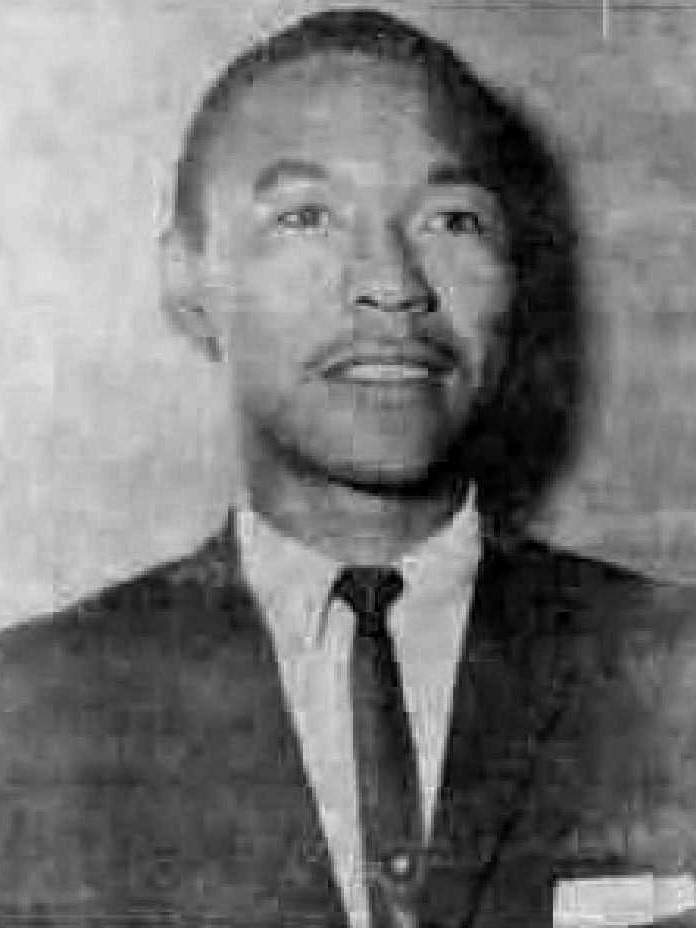
Nominee	James Eastland	Prentiss Walker	Clifton R. Whitley
Party	Democratic	Republican	Mississippi Freedom Democratic
Popular vote	258,248	105,150	30,502
Percentage	65.56%	26.70%	7.74%
- County results Eastland: 40–50% 50–60% 60–70% 70–80% 80–90% Walker: 40–50% 50–60% 60–70%
U.S. senator before election
James Eastland
Democratic
Elected U.S. Senator
James Eastland
Democratic

The 1966 United States Senate election in Mississippi was held on November 8, 1966.

Incumbent James Eastland, who first entered the Senate on 1941, was re-elected to a fifth term in office. He was challenged by U.S. Representative Prentiss Walker. Walker was the first Republican elected to Congress from Mississippi since Reconstruction and was also the first such competitive Senate candidate.

== Democratic primary ==
=== Candidates ===
- James Eastland, incumbent Senator
- Charles P. Mosby, candidate for Mississippi's 5th congressional district in 1964
- Clifton Whitley, reverend and black civil rights leader

=== Results ===
Primary results by county: Eastland: 50–60% 60–70% 70–80% 80–90% >90% Whitley: 50–60%

1966 Democratic U.S. Senate primary
Party	Candidate	Votes	%
Democratic	James Eastland (incumbent)	240,171	83.08%
Democratic	Clifton R. Whitley	34,323	11.87%
Democratic	Charles Mosby	14,591	5.05%
Total votes		289,085	100.00%

== Republican primary ==
=== Candidates ===
- Prentiss Walker, U.S. Representative from Mississippi's 4th congressional district

=== Results ===
Walker was unopposed for the Republican nomination.

== Independents and third parties ==
=== Mississippi Freedom Democratic ===
- Clifton Whitley, reverend and civil rights leader

Reverend Clifton Whitley also ran for the Mississippi Freedom Democratic Party. A sore-loser law was invoked against Whitley, who had also run in the Democratic primary against Eastland. He only won his case one week before the election, thereby preventing to enter any serious campaign or fundraising.

== General election ==
=== Campaign ===
Eastland cast the civil rights movement with the tar of Communism and Black Power and raised the bloody shirt of Reconstruction against the candidacy of Walker. He was supported by segregationists Thomas Pickens Brady, George Wallace and Leander Perez.

Walker, who voted against the Civil Rights Act of 1964, ran on the right of Eastland and solely focused on the white vote, accusing him of not being hard enough in opposing integration and being friendly with President Johnson, accusations to which Eastland partisans opposed the fact Walker nominated a black constituent, Marvell Lang, to the Air Force Academy. Walker proudly announced he went to a meeting of the Americans for the Preservation of the White Race, a Ku Klux Klan front, enabling Eastland to proudly announce he was opposed by both the Klan and the AFL–CIO.

=== Results ===
Most of the White voters stayed with Eastland, and Walker ironically won African-Americans in southwestern Mississippi who wanted to cast a protest vote against Eastland.

Years later, Wirt Yerger, the chairman of the Mississippi Republican Party in the 1960s, said that Walker's decision to relinquish his House seat after one term for the vagaries of a Senate race against Eastland was "very devastating" to the growth of the GOP in Mississippi.

General election results
Party	Candidate	Votes	%
Democratic	James Eastland (incumbent)	258,248	65.56%
Republican	Prentiss Walker	105,150	26.69%
Independent	Clifton R. Whitley	30,502	7.74%
Majority		153,098	38.87%
Turnout		393,900	
Democratic hold			

== See also ==
- 1966 United States Senate elections
