= 1982 United States elections =

- ← 1980 1981 1982 1983 1984 → Midterm elections
- Election day: November 2
- Incumbent president: ▌Ronald Reagan (R)
- Next Congress: 98th

Senate elections
- Overall control: Republican hold
- Seats contested: 33 of 100 seats
- Net seat change: Democratic +1
- 1982 Senate election results Democratic gain Democratic hold Republican gain Republican hold

House elections
- Overall control: Democratic hold
- Seats contested: All 435 voting seats
- Popular vote margin: Democratic +11.8%
- Net seat change: Democratic +26
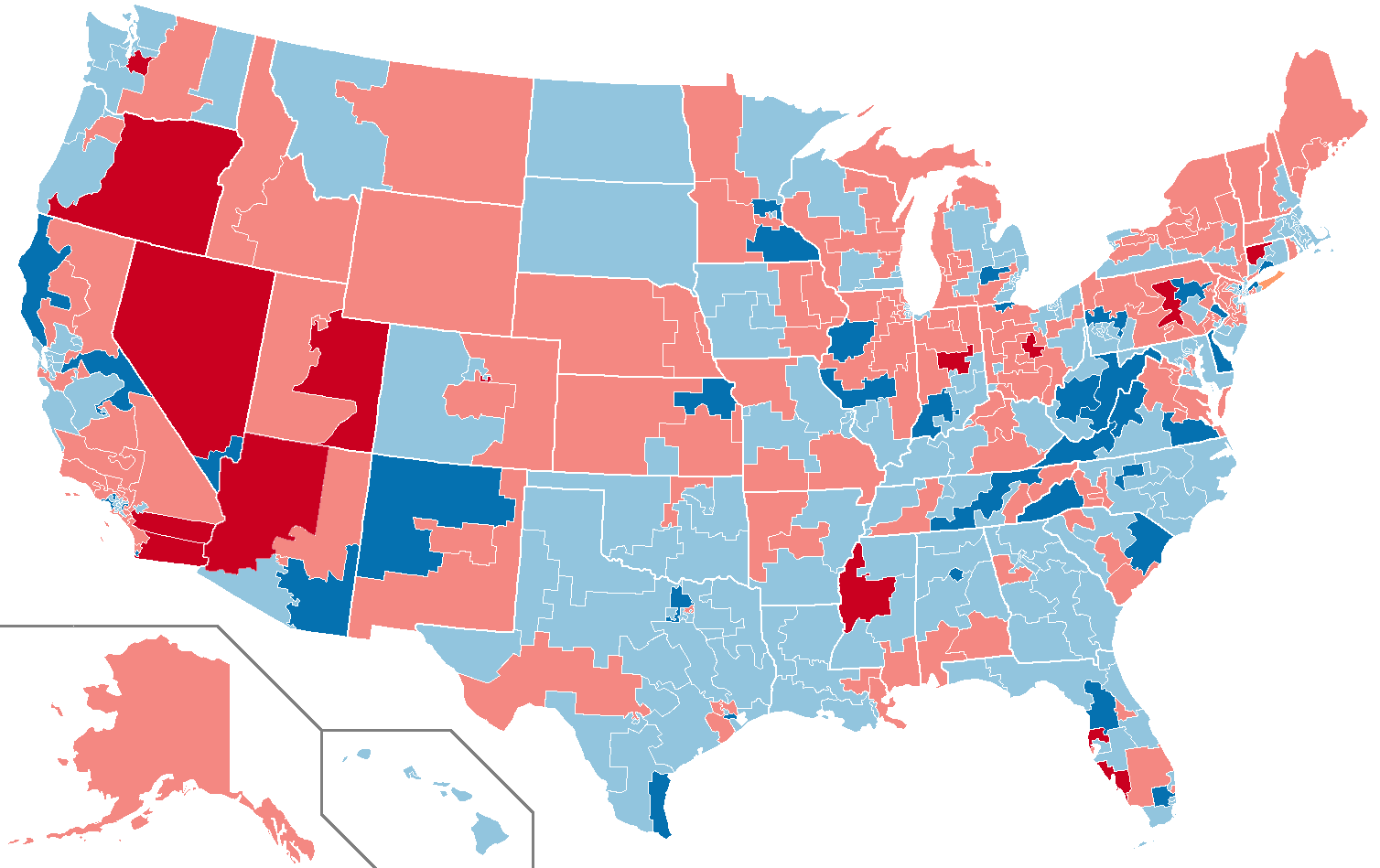
- 1982 House of Representatives election results Democratic gain Democratic hold Republican gain Republican hold

Gubernatorial elections
- Seats contested: 38 (36 states, 2 territories)
- Net seat change: Democratic +7
- 1982 gubernatorial election results Territorial races not shown Democratic gain Democratic hold Republican gain Republican hold

Elections were held on November 2, 1982. The elections occurred in the middle of Republican President Ronald Reagan's first term and after the 1980 United States census. Neither chamber of Congress changed hands.

The party balance in the Senate remained practically unchanged; Democrats only gained one seat after a Democratic-leaning Independent left the Senate. Democrats won the nationwide popular vote for the House of Representatives by a margin of 11.8 points and gained 26 seats, cementing their majority in that chamber. The House elections took place after the 1980 United States census and the subsequent Congressional re-apportionment. In the gubernatorial elections, Democrats won a net gain of seven seats.

The Democratic election gains have been linked to President Ronald Reagan's unpopularity as a result of the deepening 1982 recession, which many voters blamed on his economic policies. Prior to the elections, some observers predicted a poor performance for Republicans due to the difficult economic conditions. The Democrats' gains put a check on Reagan's policies, as the incoming Congress (particularly the House) was significantly less open to Reagan's conservative policies. Despite the Democratic electoral gains, this election was the first time that the Republican Party had successfully defended a majority in either chamber of Congress since 1930.

== See also ==
- 1982 United States House of Representatives elections
- 1982 United States Senate elections
- 1982 United States gubernatorial elections
