= Roderick Miller (politician) =

American politician

Roderick L "Rod" Miller was a politician in Louisiana. He represented Lafayette. He was a delegate to the 1980 Republican National Convention. He was a member of the Louisiana House of Representatives. He was friends with Edgar G. "Sonny" Mouton Jr.
