= Cliff Finch =

American politician

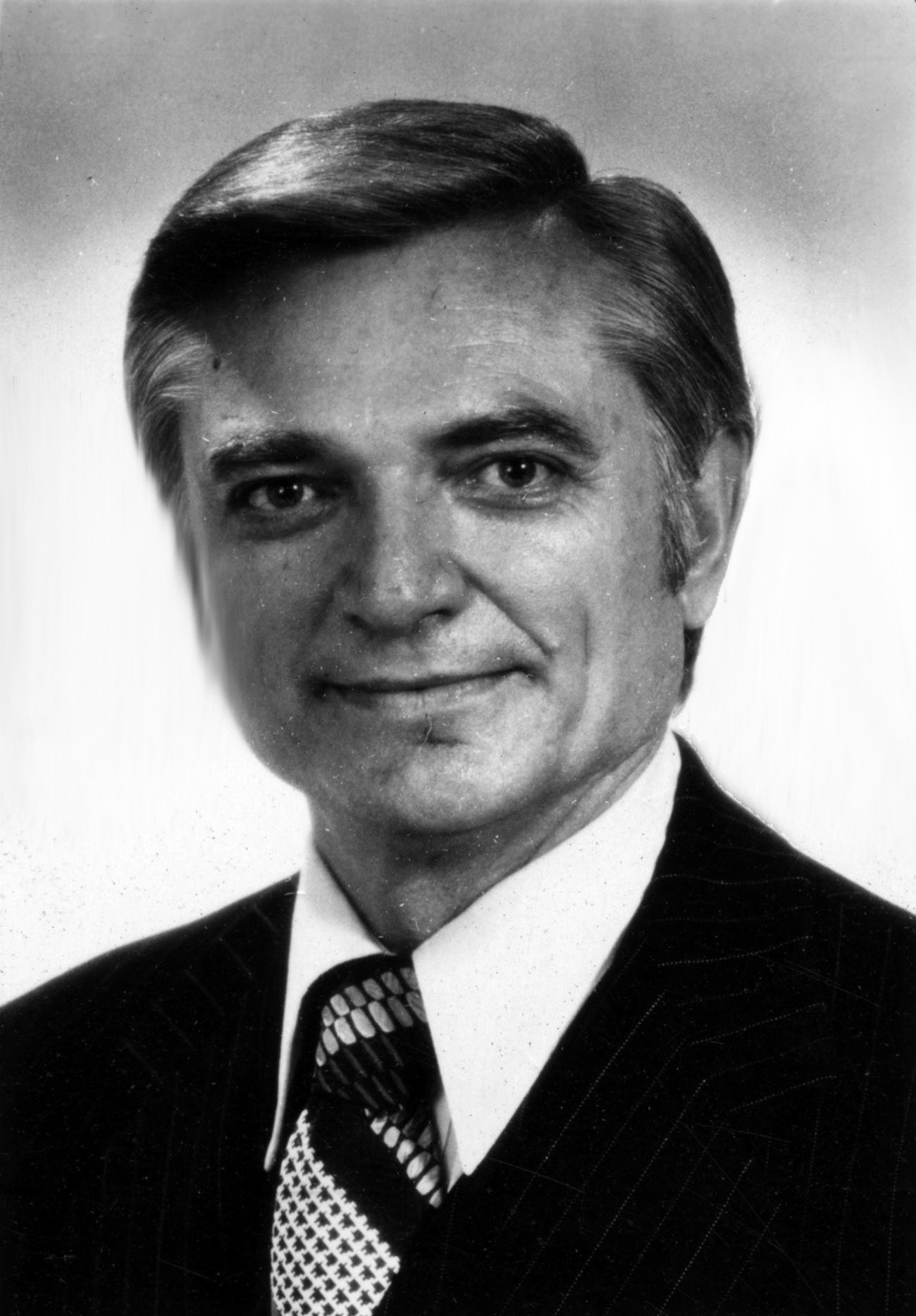
- Finch c. 1976-1980

57th Governor of Mississippi
- In office January 20, 1976 – January 22, 1980
- Lieutenant: Evelyn Gandy
- Preceded by: Bill Waller
- Succeeded by: William Winter

Member of the Mississippi House of Representatives from Panola County
- In office 1960–1964

Personal details
- Born: Charles Clifton Finch; April 4, 1927 Pope, Mississippi, U.S.
- Died: April 22, 1986 (aged 59) Batesville, Mississippi, U.S.
- Resting place: Magnolia Cemetery; Batesville, Mississippi, U.S.
- Party: Democratic
- Spouse: Zelma Smith
- Education: University of Mississippi (BA, JD)

Military service
- Allegiance: United States
- Branch/service: United States Army
- Battles/wars: Italian Campaign of World War II

Charles Clifton Finch (April 4, 1927 – April 22, 1986) was an American politician who served as the 57th governor of Mississippi from 1976 to 1980.

== Early life ==
Finch was born on April 4, 1927 in the village of Pope in Panola County, Mississippi. He was the eldest of five children of Christine (McMinn) and Carl Finch. His parents were poor farmers. He was educated in Panola County schools and at the age of 18 he enlisted in the U.S. Army. During World War II he served with the 88th Infantry Division in the Italian Campaign as a howitzer gunner. After the war, Finch returned home and attended a school for veterans. He purchased a truck and hauled logs until an economic downturn occurred. He then got a job operating heavy machinery for a construction company in Guam, while also working part-time as a barber. After fourteen months he returned to Mississippi and used his earnings to help his father rebuild his house, which had burned down. He passed General Educational Development tests and then enrolled at the University of Mississippi at Oxford in 1953. In 1958, he graduated from the University of Mississippi School of Law. During this time he worked variously as a campus police officer, bulldozer driver, dragline operator, and cotton measurer. He married Zelma Smith, a schoolteacher, on December 14, 1953. They had four children together.

== Early political career ==
Finch opened a law practice in Batesville after earning his law degree. He specialized in damage suits, and in time became very financially successful. In 1959 he was elected over eight opponents to the Mississippi House of Representatives, where he served from 1960 to 1964. During this time Finch supported racial segregation and backed Governor Ross Barnett's efforts to preserve segregation in the state. In 1964 and again in 1968, he was elected district attorney for the Seventeenth Judicial District. In 1971, he was an unsuccessful candidate for lieutenant governor. Despite his loss, he continued to make appearances around the state.

== Gubernatorial career ==
=== Election ===
Finch ran for the office of Governor of Mississippi in 1975, facing William F. Winter and Maurice Dantin in the Democratic primary. Most political observers initially doubted Finch's chances, and he placed far behind Winter in public polls. He cast himself as "the workingman's candidate"; to do this, he used a lunch pail bearing his name as his campaign symbol and spent one day a week performing a blue collar job, including installing a car engine, pumping fuel, pricing groceries, and driving a bulldozer. He reasoned, "When I sit down and open up my lunch box with that man or that woman who has been working side by side with me, sweating just like me, they know that I am sincere." His one major policy proposal was the creation of a Mississippi Internal Development Assistance System (MIDAS), which entailed coordinated action among state agencies to finance and supply workers to new industries, issue low-interest long-range loans to spur development, and increased marketing to attract outside investment. He shied away from journalists, not holding press conferences and avoiding television interviews.

Winter denounced Finch's tactics as mere gimmicks, saying, "I am convinced that the people do not want a clown or stuntman leading you for four years." Finch retorted, "If they call them rednecks, clown, or whatever, then I'm proud to be one." Winter led the first primary with 36 percent of the vote, while Finch came second with 32 percent and Dantin placed third. Finch repeated his blue collar message in anticipation of the runoff, though Winter attacked him for lacking a substantive program. Winter suggested the two debate, but Finch declined, saying he was "too busy to give Winter a platform." He also increased his outreach to black voters, greeting a winning Miss Black America contestant at the airport and running a television ad showing him speaking about his youth to a black man. In the runoff, Finch won with 58 percent of the vote—one of the largest victories ever in a gubernatorial runoff—taking 442,864 votes to Winter's 324,749 votes.

The 1975 general election marked the first time in decades that the Republican Party offered a serious candidate for gubernatorial office, Gil Carmichael. A black politician, Henry J. Kirksey, also ran as an independent. Carmichael offered specific proposals and stances, while Finch largely ignored him and espoused vague and confused statements, such as describing himself as "progressive, but conservative." The election was close, with Finch winning with just slightly more than half the vote; the margin was about 50,000 votes, and black voters proved key to his victory. In the same election, Evelyn Gandy won the lieutenant governorship, and Democrats retained control of the state legislature. Carmichael drew 47 percent of the vote, a high figure for a statewide Republican candidate at that time. Finch was inaugurated on January 20, 1976.

=== Executive action ===
In office, Finch held monthly "work days", whereby he would perform menial jobs to keep in contact with constituents. As governor, he helped save Mississippi's savings and loan industry from collapse, and provided flood relief after the 1979 Easter flood. During his tenure several people of minority status were elevated to positions of responsibility. He appointed the first black woman to the State College Board, selected a black man to lead the Governor's Office of Minority Affairs, and expanded the Minority Affairs Council to include Chinese people, Choctaw Native Americans, and more African Americans. His actions to increase minority representation in government remained largely nominal; only seven percent of his first-year appointments went to African Americans.

Finch's tenure was marred by scandals. A federal grand jury conducted a three-year-long investigation into his administration and several state agencies were accused of corruption and mismanagement. Finch was never found guilty of any wrongdoing, though some of his aides and appointees were indicted. His marital tensions also received media coverage, as it was rumored that he and his wife fought in the Governor's Mansion. One rumor reported in the Jackson media suggested that Zelma shot Finch in the mansion during a heated debated about rumored affairs, though no evidence has ever been produced to substantiate the story. She eventually moved out, and Finch told the press that she was mentally ill. In 1979 his wife filed for divorce. By the end of his term, his approval ratings were the lowest among any Mississippi public official.

=== Legislative action ===
Many of Finch's proposals, including a repeal of the state sales tax on food and drugs, were rebuffed by the legislature. He pushed for an amendment to the state constitution to allow for gubernatorial succession, provoking the ire of leading businessmen and legislators. He convinced the Senate to approve such an amendment but the measure was defeated in the House of Representatives. He signed the act which abolished the State Sovereignty Commission.

=== Political affairs ===
At the time Finch took office, the Mississippi Democratic Party was split into two factions: the Regulars and the Loyalists. The split traced back to the 1960s, when black Democrats created the Mississippi Freedom Democratic Party to challenge segregationist delegations at Democratic National Conventions. The segregationists became the Regulars, while the integrated forces became the Loyalists. Attempts to reconcile the factions in the early 1970s had failed. Following his election, Finch pledged to reunite the two blocs. The factions reached a compromise, whereby a white Regular and a black Loyalist would serve together as co-chairs of the party executive committee.

While still governor, Finch ran for the United States Senate in 1978, but he was defeated in the Democratic party primary by Maurice Dantin, who then lost in the general election to the Republican U.S. Representative Thad Cochran. Some critics accused him of neglecting his gubernatorial responsibilities in favor of advancing his own career. He left gubernatorial office on January 22, 1980.

== Presidential campaign ==
After leaving office, Finch declared his candidacy in the 1980 Democratic presidential primaries against incumbent U.S. President Jimmy Carter. Entering the campaign shortly before the New Hampshire presidential primary, he failed to secure the 1,000 signatures needed before the filing deadline to have his name placed on the ballot and declared that he would be a write-in candidate. Garnering almost no national traction, he withdrew his candidacy in June.

== Later life ==
Finch resumed practicing law following his exit from politics. He died on April 22, 1986, at his law office in Batesville, Mississippi after a massive heart attack. He was subsequently buried at the Magnolia Cemetery in Batesville. Historian Chris Danielson wrote, "The fusion of the white and black wings of the state Democratic Party was Finch's greatest legacy. This action integrated and modernized the state Democrats and finally led to a shedding of the party's segregationist past."

== Works cited ==
- Bass, Jack (1995). The Transformation of Southern Politics: Social Change and Political Consequence Since 1945 (reprint ed.). University of Georgia Press. ISBN 9780820317281.
- Bolton, Charles C. (2013). William F. Winter and the New Mississippi: A Biography. Jackson: University Press of Mississippi. ISBN 978-1-61703-787-0.
- Danielson, Chris (2019). "Cliff Finch (1976-1980) and the Limits of Racial Integration" (PDF). The Journal of Mississippi History. LXXXI (1–2): 121–132. ISSN 0022-2771.
- Foster, E. C. (1983). "A Time of Challenge: Afro-Mississippi Political Developments Since 1965". The Journal of Negro History. 68 (2): 185–200. doi:10.2307/2717721. JSTOR 2717721. S2CID 149567064.
- Mississippi Official and Statistical Register 1980–1984. Jackson: Mississippi Secretary of State. 1980. OCLC 1131544573.
- Sansing, David G. (2016). Mississippi Governors: Soldiers, Statesmen, Scholars, Scoundrels (first ed.). Oxford: Nautilus Publishing Company. ISBN 978-1-936946-81-5.
- Sumners, Cecil L. (1998). The Governors of Mississippi. Pelican Publishing. ISBN 9781455605217.
- Yates, Gayle Graham (1990). Mississippi Mind: A Personal Cultural History of an American State. University of Tennessee Press. ISBN 9780870496431.

Party political offices
Preceded by Bill Waller	Democratic nominee for Governor of Mississippi; 1975	Succeeded by William Winter
Political offices
Preceded by William Waller	Governor of Mississippi; January 20, 1976 – January 22, 1980	Succeeded by William Winter
