= Edgar Mouton =

American politician (1929–2016)

Louisiana State Senate (now District 23)
- In office 1966–1980
- Preceded by: Garland L. Bonin
- Succeeded by: Allen Bares

President pro tempore of the Louisiana State Senate
- In office 1976–1980
- Preceded by: Michael O’Keefe
- Succeeded by: Samuel B. Nunez Jr.

Louisiana State Representative for Lafayette Parish
- In office 1964–1966
- Preceded by: Richard J. Bertrand
- Succeeded by: Roderick Miller

Personal details
- Born: September 22, 1929 Lafayette, Louisiana, U.S.
- Died: March 24, 2016 (aged 86) Lafayette, Louisiana, U.S.
- Resting place: Calvary Cemetery in Lafayette, Louisiana
- Party: Democratic
- Spouse: Patsy Dauphin Mouton
- Children: Four daughters
- Parent(s): Edgar G. Sr. and Myrtle Grevemberg Mouton
- Education: Cathedral High School; Tulane University
- Occupation: Attorney

Edgar Gonzague "Sonny" Mouton Jr. (September 22, 1929 – March 24, 2016) was an American attorney from Lafayette, Louisiana, who was a Democratic member of the Louisiana House of Representatives from 1964 to 1966 and the Louisiana State Senate from 1966 to 1980. He ran unsuccessfully for governor in the 1979 nonpartisan blanket primary.

Preceded by At-large members: Louis J. Michot Richard J. Bertrand	Louisiana State Representative for Lafayette Parish; Edgar Gonzague "Sonny" Mouton Jr. 1964–1966	Succeeded by Roderick Miller
Preceded by Garland L. Bonin	Louisiana State Senator for now District 23 (Lafayette Parish); Edgar Gonzague "Sonny" Mouton Jr. 1966–1980	Succeeded by Allen Bares
Preceded by Lieutenant Governor James Edward "Jimmy" Fitzmorris Jr.	Louisiana State Senate President Pro Tempore; Edgar Gonzague "Sonny" Mouton Jr. 1976–1980	Succeeded by Michael O'Keefe
