= Louis Lambert (politician) =

American politician (1940–2025)

Member of the Louisiana Senate from the 18th district
- In office 1994–2004

Member of Louisiana Public Service Commission

Personal details
- Born: Louis Joseph Lambert, Jr. December 14, 1940
- Died: September 27, 2025 (aged 84) Sorrento, Louisiana, U.S.
- Party: Democratic
- Education: Louisiana State University (BA) Loyola University (LLB)
- Profession: Attorney

Louis Lambert (December 14, 1940 – September 27, 2025) was an American politician, lawyer and teacher from Prairieville, Louisiana. He is best known for his campaign for the 1979 Louisiana gubernatorial election, which he lost to David Treen in one of the closest elections in recent memory. By losing this election, Lambert became the first Democrat to lose a general election campaign for governor in Louisiana since Reconstruction.

== Background ==
Lambert was born on December 14, 1940. He attended Louisiana State University for his undergraduate degree before receiving his LLB from Loyola University.

Lambert died from liver cancer in Sorrento on September 27, 2025, at the age of 84.

== Career ==
In addition to running for governor, Lambert also served as a public service commissioner and state senator in Louisiana.

Party political offices
Preceded by Edwin Edwards	Democratic nominee for Governor of Louisiana; 1979	Succeeded by Edwin Edwards
