= William G. Burgin =

American politician

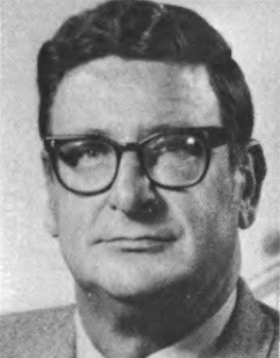

Member of the Mississippi Senate from the 6th district
- In office January 1964 – 1979
- In office 1952 – January 1960
- Preceded by: T. H. Henry

Personal details
- Born: August 3, 1924 Rock Hill, South Carolina
- Died: October 3, 2002 (aged 78)
- Party: Democratic

William Garner Burgin Jr. (August 3, 1924 – October 3, 2002) was an American attorney and politician. He served in the Mississippi State Senate from 1952 to 1960 and from 1964 to 1979, when he was convicted of conspiring to defraud the government.

== Biography ==
William Garner Burgin Jr. was born on August 3, 1924, in Rock Hill, South Carolina. He graduated from Ole Miss in 1947. In April 1952, Burgin was first elected to the Mississippi State Senate to replace the deceased T. H. Henry. Burgin was re-elected in 1955 and served in the 1956-1960 term. He was re-elected to the Senate in 1964, and was re-elected in 1967, 1971, and 1975.

In 1977, Burgin (D) State Senator and Chair of the Senate Appropriations Committee, was caught in an FBI investigation, for conspiring to defraud the US Government Head Start Program. He was found guilty and sentenced to fourteen months in prison and fined $10,000. Burgin was fined $10,000. Burgin died on October 3, 2002.
