= Henry Kirksey =

American politician (1915–2005)

Henry Jay Kirksey Sr. (May 9, 1915 - December 9, 2005) was a state legislator and civil rights leader in Mississippi. He served in the Mississippi Senate. He was born on the outskirts of Tupelo, Mississippi. He advocated and protested for the release of Mississippi Sovereignty Commission records. He also advocated for the Confederate battle flag to be removed from the upper left corner of the Mississippi's state flag. He served in the U.S. Army, advocated for African American political and jusicial candidates, was a printer, newspaper editor, and map maker. He was involved in lawsuits for African American civil rights and political representation. He was also an adjunct professor.

He opposed construction of the Jackson Metro Parkway. He had a son and a daughter.

He was inducted into North Carolina Central University's Athletics Hall of Fame in 1990 for his football career at the school.

Henry J. Kirksey Middle School in Jackson, Mississippi opened in 2010.
