= John Arthur Eaves =

American lawyer and politician (1935–2022)

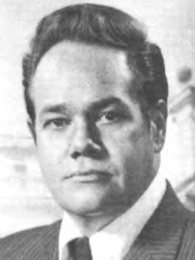

Member of the Mississippi House of Representatives from the 31st district
- In office 1972–1976

Personal details
- Born: July 31, 1935 Louisville, Mississippi, U.S.
- Died: March 18, 2022 (aged 86) Jackson, Mississippi, U.S.
- Party: Democratic Party
- Children: 3, including John Jr.
- Education: Mississippi State University; University of Mississippi School of Law

John Arthur Eaves Sr. (July 31, 1935 – March 18, 2022) was an American lawyer and politician. A Democrat, he served one term in the Mississippi House of Representatives from 1972 to 1976 and made three unsuccessful bids for gubernatorial office in 1975, 1979, and 1987.

== Early life ==
John Arthur Eaves was born on July 31, 1935, in Louisville, Mississippi. He graduated from Louisville High School in 1954 and Mississippi State University in 1959 with a degree in geology. He subsequently joined the U.S. Army, reaching the rank of sergeant and serving as a judge advocate in the Judge Advocate General's Corps before obtaining a Bachelor of Laws and a Juris Doctor from the University of Mississippi School of Law. He married Patricia Lovorn on August 23, 1963, and had three children with her: John Arthur Jr., Paige, and Tiffany. He began practicing law in Jackson, Mississippi, in 1963 and established a reputation as a successful trial lawyer.

== Political career ==
A Democrat, Eaves served one term in the Mississippi House of Representatives from 1972 to 1976, representing the 31st District. Eaves mounted his first gubernatorial bid in 1975, finishing fourth in the Democratic primary with 50,606 votes. In 1979 he ran again, placing third in the primary with 143,411 votes. He launched his final campaign in 1987, finishing fourth with 98,517 votes.

== Later life ==
Eaves died on March 18, 2022, at the Mississippi Baptist Medical Center in Jackson, succumbing to cancer.

== Works cited ==
- Mississippi Official and Statistical Register 1972–1976. Jackson: Mississippi Secretary of State. 1973. OCLC 1131544573.
