= Jimmy Fitzmorris =

American politician (1921–2021)

46th Lieutenant Governor of Louisiana
- In office May 9, 1972 – March 10, 1980
- Governor: Edwin W. Edwards
- Preceded by: Clarence C. Aycock
- Succeeded by: Robert Louis Freeman Sr.

Personal details
- Born: November 15, 1921 New Orleans, Louisiana, U.S.
- Died: June 30, 2021 (aged 99) Slidell, Louisiana, U.S.
- Party: Democratic
- Spouse: Gloria Lopez Fitzmorris
- Children: 1

Military service
- Allegiance: United States
- Branch/service: United States Army
- Years of service: 1942–1945
- Rank: Major
- Battles/wars: World War II

James Edward Fitzmorris Jr. (November 15, 1921 – June 30, 2021) was an American politician who served on the New Orleans City Council from 1954 to 1966 and as the 46th lieutenant governor of Louisiana from 1972 to 1980.

Fitzmorris graduated from Loyola University New Orleans in 1962 and was an initiated member of Tau Kappa Epsilon fraternity from the University of New Orleans.

Party political offices
| Preceded by Taddy Aycock | Democratic nominee for Lieutenant Governor of Louisiana; 1972 | Succeeded by Robert Louis Freeman Sr. |
Political offices
| Preceded by Clarence C. Aycock | Lieutenant Governor of Louisiana; 1972–1980 | Succeeded by Robert Louis Freeman Sr. |
