= List of elections in 1983 =

The following elections occurred in the year 1983.

== Africa ==
- 1983 Cameroonian parliamentary election
- 1983 Equatorial Guinean legislative election
- 1983 Kenyan general election
- 1983 Malagasy parliamentary election
- 1983 Malawian general election
- 1983 Mauritian general election
- 1983 Nigerian parliamentary election
- 1983 Nigerian presidential election
- 1983 Rwandan parliamentary election
- 1983 Rwandan presidential election
- 1983 Senegalese general election
- 1983 Seychellois parliamentary election
- 1983 Sudanese presidential election
- 1983 Swazi parliamentary election
- 1983 Zambian general election

== Asia ==
- 1983 Cypriot presidential election
- 1983 Israeli municipal elections
- 1983 Israeli presidential election
- 1983 Japanese House of Councillors election
- 1983 Japanese general election
- 1983 Maldivian presidential election
- 1983 North Korean local elections
- 1983 Republic of China legislative election
- 1983 Sarawak state election
- 1983 Thai general election
- 1983 Turkish general election

== Europe ==
- 1983 Åland legislative election
- 1983 Andorran local elections
- 1983 Austrian legislative election
- 1983 Finnish parliamentary election
- 1983 French municipal elections
- 1983 Icelandic parliamentary election
- 1983 Irish presidential election
- 1983 Italian general election
- 1983 Liechtenstein local elections
- 1983 Monegasque general election
- 1983 Norwegian local elections
- 1983 Portuguese legislative election
- 1983 French municipal elections
- 1983 San Marino general election
- 1983 Swiss federal election
- 1983 Turkish general election

=== Germany ===
- 1983 Rhineland-Palatinate state election
- 1983 West German federal election

=== Spain ===
- Elections to the Aragonese Corts, 1983
- Elections to the Corts Valencianes, 1983
- 1983 Spanish local elections

=== United Kingdom ===
- 1983 United Kingdom general election
  - England: 1983 United Kingdom general election in England
  - Scotland: 1983 United Kingdom general election in Scotland
  - Wales: 1983 United Kingdom general election in Wales
  - Northern Ireland: 1983 United Kingdom general election in Northern Ireland
  - List of MPs elected in the 1983 United Kingdom general election
- 1983 Bermondsey by-election
- 1983 Darlington by-election
- 1983 Labour Party leadership election (UK)
- 1983 Penrith and The Border by-election

==== United Kingdom local ====
- 1983 United Kingdom local elections

===== English local =====
- 1983 Bristol City Council election
- 1983 Manchester Council election
- 1983 Trafford Council election
- 1993 Wiltshire Council election
- 1983 Wolverhampton Council election

== North America ==
=== Canada ===
- 1983 British Columbia general election
- 1983 Edmonton municipal election
- 1983 Manitoba municipal elections
- 1983 Northwest Territories general election
- 1983 Progressive Conservative leadership election
- 1983 Winnipeg municipal election

=== Caribbean ===
- 1983 Bermudian general election
- 1983 Jamaican general election
- 1983 Montserratian general election

=== United States ===
==== United States lieutenant gubernatorial ====
- 1983 Kentucky lieutenant gubernatorial election
- 1983 Louisiana lieutenant gubernatorial election

==== United States gubernatorial ====
- 1983 Kentucky gubernatorial election
- 1983 Louisiana gubernatorial election
- 1983 Mississippi gubernatorial election
- 1983 United States gubernatorial elections

==== United States House of Representatives ====
- 1983 United States House of Representatives elections

==== United States Senate ====
- 1983 United States Senate special election in Washington

==== United States mayoral elections ====
- 1983 Baltimore mayoral election
- 1983 Boston mayoral election
- 1983 Burlington mayoral election
- 1983 Chicago mayoral election
- 1983 Durham mayoral election
- 1983 Evansville mayoral election
- 1983 Hartford mayoral election
- 1983 Indianapolis mayoral election
- 1983 Manchester, New Hampshire, mayoral election
- 1983 Madison mayoral election
- 1983 Philadelphia mayoral election
- 1983 San Francisco mayoral election
- 1983 South Bend mayoral election
- 1983 Springfield, Massachusetts mayoral election
- 1983 Tampa mayoral election

== Oceania ==
- March 1983 Cook Islands general election
- November 1983 Cook Islands general election
- 1983 Kiribati parliamentary election
- 1983 Kiribati presidential election
- 1983 Micronesian general election
- 1983 Nauruan parliamentary election
- 1983 Vanuatuan general election

=== Australia ===
- 1983 Australian federal election
- 1983 Bragg state by-election
- 1983 Bruce by-election
- 1983 Kogarah state by-election
- 1983 Maroubra state by-election
- 1983 Marrickville state by-election
- 1983 Moreton by-election
- 1983 Northern Territory general election
- 1983 Queensland state election
- 1983 Riverstone state by-election
- 1983 Springvale state by-election
- 1983 Wannon by-election
- 1983 Western Australian state election

== South America ==
- 1983 Argentine general election
- 1983 Paraguayan general election
- 1983 Venezuelan presidential election
