= Jack Reed (Mississippi politician) =

American businessman and politician

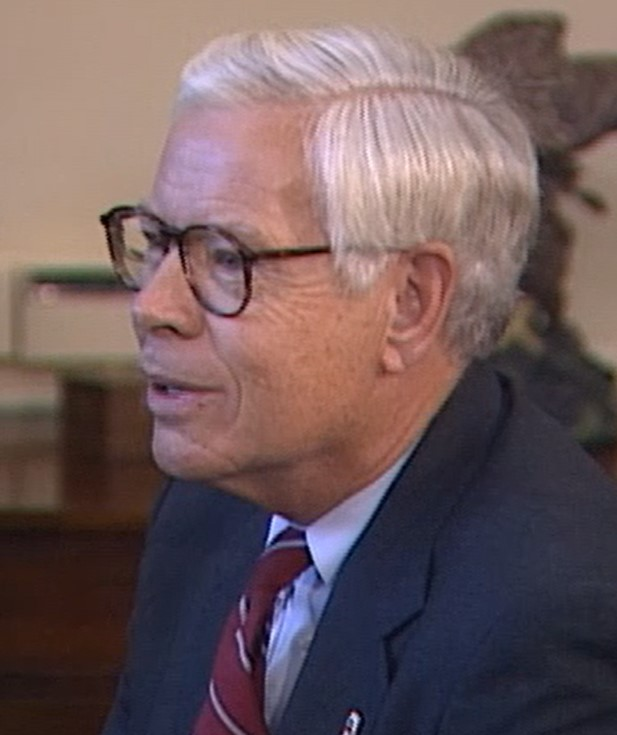
- Reed in 1987

Chairman of the Mississippi Board of Education
- In office July 2, 1984 – 1987
- Governor: William Allain

Personal details
- Born: Jack Raymond Reed Sr. May 19, 1924 Tupelo, Mississippi, U.S.
- Died: January 27, 2016 (aged 91)
- Party: Republican
- Spouse: Frances Purvis Reed
- Children: 4
- Occupation: Businessman

Military service
- Allegiance: United States
- Branch/service: United States Army
- Unit: U.S. Army Intelligence Corps
- Battles/wars: World War II

Jack Raymond Reed Sr. (May 19, 1924 – January 27, 2016) was an American businessman and politician. Born in Tupelo, Mississippi, he served in the United States Army during World War II and earned degrees from Vanderbilt University and New York University before returning home to help run his family's retail business. He later assumed control over their department store after his father's death in 1956. Active in local civic affairs, he chaired the Mississippi Economic Council from 1963 to 1964 and became a vocal proponent for public education. Appointed to the Mississippi Board of Education in 1984, he chaired the body until he decided to run for the office of governor of Mississippi in 1987 as a moderate Republican. Reed lost the general election but performed better than any Republican gubernatorial candidate had in Mississippi in the 20th century to that point. In his later life he continued to advocate for public education. He died in 2016.

== Early life ==
Jack Raymond Reed was born on May 19, 1924, in Tupelo, Mississippi, to Bob and Hoyt Reed. His father was a businessman who had established a grocery store and dry goods store in the town. Reed attended public schools in Tupelo before enrolling at Vanderbilt University.

Upon the outbreak of World War II, Reed enlisted in the United States Army and was assigned to the U.S. Army Intelligence Corps. He was taught Japanese and then served as a code-breaker, operating from Australia. He later joined the occupation of Japan before leaving the army with the rank of sergeant. He finished his studies at Vanderbilt and received a master's degree in retailing from New York University. While at the latter school, he completed internships at Brooks Brothers and Bloomingdale's. He rejected a permanent job offer at Brooks Brothers and returned home in 1948 to help with his family's venture, Reed's Department Store. He married Frances Camille Purvis in 1950 and had four children with her.

== Business and civic career ==
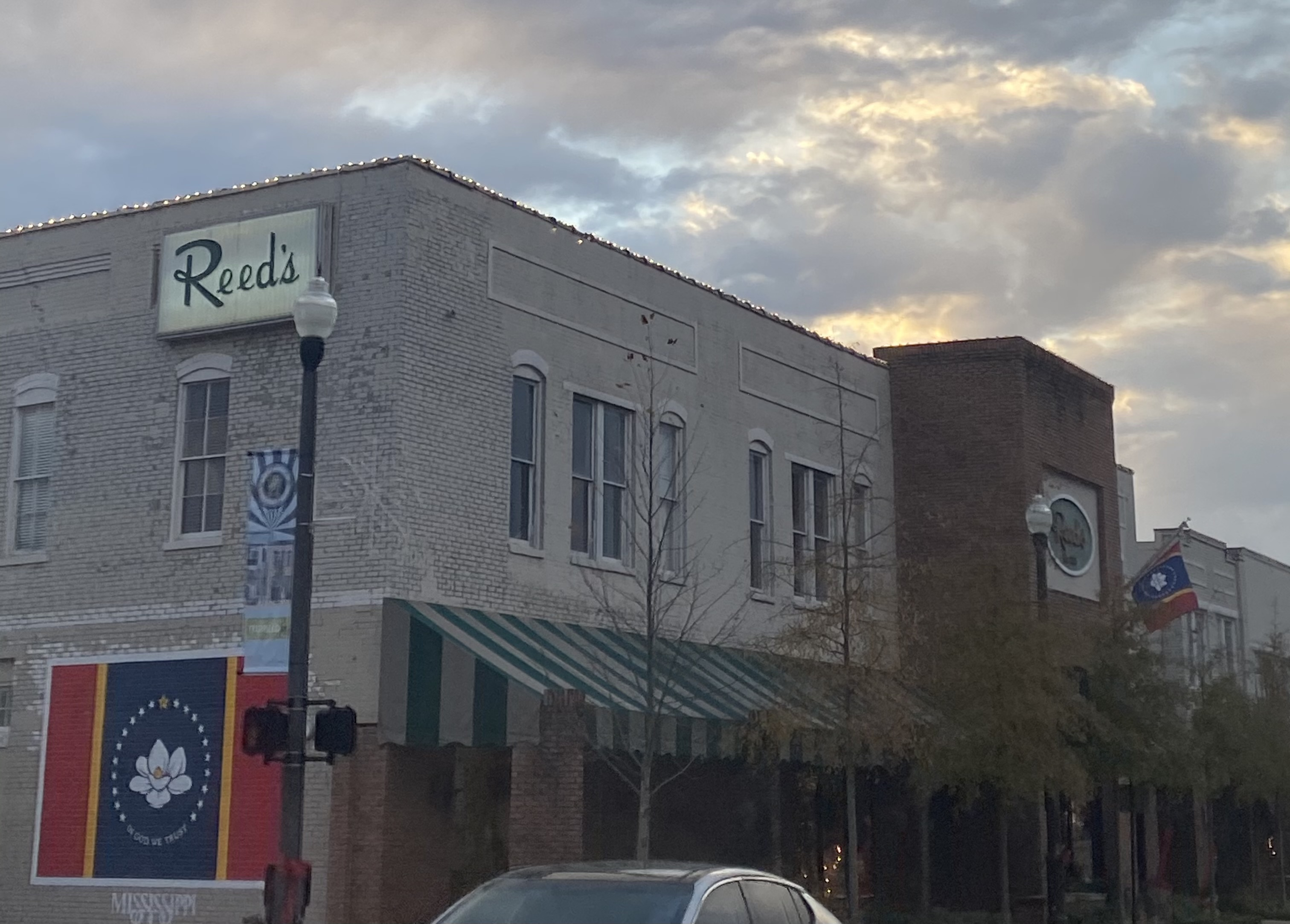
Reed's Department Store in Tupelo

Reed's father died in 1956, leaving Reed and his two brothers equal partners in the store and other family business ventures. They shortly thereafter reorganized their holdings, leaving Reed in charge of the store. By the 2010s, Reed's Department Store was one of only two major independent department store's in operation in the state. Smaller branches of the retailer were later opened in Columbus and Starkville. He chaired the board of directors of a local bank and the Mississippi Economic Council from 1963 to 1964. He was elected president of the Mississippi Retail Merchants Association in 1966. In 1984 he and his brothers opened a bookstore in Tupelo.

Reed became active in civic affairs in Tupelo. He believed that Jim Crow racial segregation and racial bigotry harmed Mississippi's economic prospects and during the 1960s encouraged white residents to remain supportive of the local public schools despite federal integration orders. Following the Ole Miss riot, in which a white mob attempted to halt the integration of the University of Mississippi, and numerous calls by politicians to close the state's public schools, Reed delivered a speech at the Heidelberg Hotel on January 22, 1963. He said, "We must support public education and keep our schools open! [...] A responsible citizen who wishes to see Mississippi prosper and realize her full economic potential can hardly do less!" This made him one of only a few prominent white Mississippians to question the state's approach towards segregation. Though several state legislators in attendance walked out during his speech and one man bought a half-page newspaper advertisement to denounce him, Reed later viewed it as his "defining moment" in civic affairs. He worked with Tupelo Journal publisher George McLean to cofound LIFT, a charitable organization which administered the Head Start program. He later served on the board of directors of the Journal.

== Political career ==
In 1980 the Mississippi State Legislature, at the request of Governor William F. Winter, created a commission to study public education, the Blue Ribbon Committee on Education. Winter appointed Reed to the body, which subsequently elected him as its chairman. The committee worked through the year to document perceived flaws in the state's education system and proposed reforms. For his work, the Mississippi Association of Educators accorded Reed its 1981 Friend of Education Award. Some of the reforms were implemented in the Education Reform Act of 1982.

By the 1980s Reed had a reputation for supporting the Republican Party at a national level but supporting the Democratic Party in statewide contests. He supported businessman Mike Sturdivant's candidacy in the 1983 Democratic gubernatorial primary. The primary and general election were won by William Allain. Despite the fact that Reed had backed one of his opponents, the governor appreciated his work on education reform and appointed him to the first lay Mississippi Board of Education in 1984. Reed was sworn in on July 2 and the board members subsequently chose him to chair the body. He left the board in 1987 to run for governor.

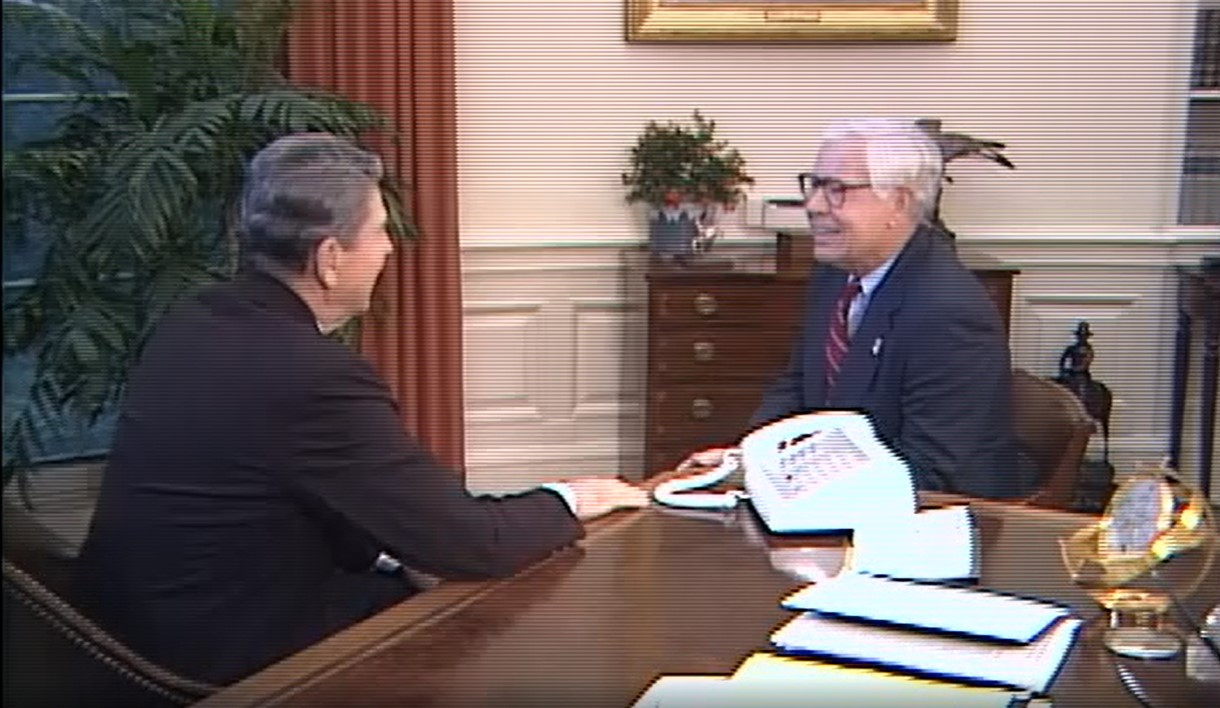
Reed meeting with President Ronald Reagan, 1987

Reed began mulling over the possibility of contesting the 1987 Mississippi gubernatorial election in 1986, though he was initially unsure of which party's nomination he would seek. Reed eventually declared his candidacy as a Republican, later explaining that "it was only chance I had to get elected". He said of his personal views on the parties that "In my heart I'm a Democrat but in my head I'm a Republican." He ultimately won the Republican primary, defeating financial consultant Doug Lemon with 78 percent of the vote.

Reed ran as a moderate in the general election against Democratic State Auditor Ray Mabus. Both candidates supported education improvement, government reform, and industrial recruitment, though by different means. Mabus sought to increase teacher salaries to the Southeastern average rate within one year, while Reed proposed a five-year plan. He also sought to stress that he was "not a professional politician" and not beholden to partisan loyalties. He conducted outreach with black voters and gained the support of some black businessmen—one of the few Mississippi Republicans to do so—but struggled to gain larger black traction. He also supported abortion restrictions and school prayer. Mabus outspent Reed's campaign and won with 53 percent of the vote. Reed performed well among white rural Democrats due to his socially conservative views on abortion and prayer in school, but attracted little black support due to the nationally conservative shift of the Republican Party. He also lost some urban counties to Mabus. Nevertheless, his 46.6 percent of the vote was the largest any Republican gubernatorial candidate had received in Mississippi in the 20th century to that point. He supported Pete Johnson in the 1991 Republican gubernatorial primary.

During the 1987 campaign Reed became acquainted with U.S. Vice President George H. W. Bush. After Bush became president, he appointed Reed to a seat on the National Advisory Committee on Education Research and Improvement in 1990. Reed was made the council's chairman, but felt the body accomplished little, and he left in 1993 upon Bill Clinton's assumption of the presidency. In 2000 he served on a state commission to consider alterations to the flag of Mississippi, including the removal of its canton of the Confederate battle flag. Accepting the position only after urging from the commission chairman, William Winter, Reed later dubbed it "the low point" of his public career, expressing dismay at the public opposition to altering the flag. The commission held a public meeting chaired by him in Tupelo where many in the audience denounced the notion of taking the flag, and as a result Reed received angry letters and some protestors picketed his department store. In 2004 he and Winter lobbied for the legislature to fund the Mississippi Adequate Education Program and hosted eight public forums to build public support for the program. He jokingly referred to their partnership as "Octogenarians Against Ignorance".

== Later life ==
In 2007, the Mississippi Association of Partners in Education created the Winter-Reed Partnership Award in homage to Reed and Winter to be bestowed annually to a Mississippian for public service in education. A collection of Reed's speeches from his career, A Time To Speak, was published in 2009. In 2015, Reed was awarded an honorary Doctor of Public Service degree from Millsaps College. He died on January 27, 2016, at the age of 91. The following day U.S. Senator Thad Cochran read a tribute of him into the Congressional Record. A funeral was held at First United Methodist Church in Tupelo on January 30. His son, Jack Reed Jr., served as mayor of Tupelo from 2009 to 2013.

== Works cited ==
- Blade, Robert (2012). Tupelo Man: The Life and Times of George McLean, a Most Peculiar Newspaper Publisher. University Press of Mississippi. ISBN 9781617036286.
- Bolton, Charles C. (2013). William F. Winter and the New Mississippi: A Biography. Jackson: University Press of Mississippi. ISBN 978-1-61703-787-0.
- Danielson, Chris (2011). After Freedom Summer : How Race Realigned Mississippi Politics, 1965–1986. Gainesville: University of Florida Press. ISBN 9780813037387.
- Dement, Polly (2014). Mississippi Entrepreneurs. University Press of Mississippi. ISBN 9781626741232.
- Krane, Dale; Shaffer, Stephen D. (1992). Mississippi Government and Politics: Modernizers Versus Traditionalists. University of Nebraska Press. ISBN 9780803277588.
- McKenzie, Danny; Reed, Jack Raymond (2009). A Time to Speak : Speeches by Jack Reed. University Press of Mississippi. ISBN 9781604731309.
- Lamis, Alexander P., ed. (1999). Southern Politics in the 1990s. Louisiana State University Press. ISBN 9780807166765.
- Nash, Jere; Taggart, Andy (2009). Mississippi Politics: The Struggle for Power, 1976-2008 (second ed.). University Press of Mississippi. ISBN 9781604733570.

Party political offices
Preceded by Leon Bramlett	Republican nominee for Governor of Mississippi; 1987	Succeeded by Kirk Fordice
