= 1983 United States gubernatorial elections =

- October 22 and November 8, 1983

3 governorships
	Majority party	Minority party
Party	Democratic	Republican
Seats before	34	16
Seats after	35	15
Seat change	▲1	▼1
Seats up	2	1
Seats won	3	0
- Democratic hold Democratic gain

United States gubernatorial elections were held on October 22 and November 8, 1983, in three states. Following the elections, the Democratic Party won all three seats.

== Election results ==
State	Incumbent	Party	First elected	Result	Candidates
Kentucky	John Y. Brown Jr.	Democratic	1979	Incumbent term-limited. New governor elected. Democratic hold.	✓ Martha Layne Collins (Democratic) 54.5%; Jim Bunning (Republican) 44.1%; Nicholas McCubbin (Independent) 1.4%
Louisiana	Dave Treen	Republican	1979	Incumbent lost re-election. New governor elected. Democratic gain.	✓ Edwin Edwards (Democratic) 62.3%; Dave Treen (Republican) 36.4%; Robert M. Ross (Republican) 0.5%; Ken "Cousin Ken" Lewis (Democratic) 0.3%; Charlie Moore (Independent) 0.1%; Floyd W. Smith, Jr. (Democratic) 0.1%; Midiele Smith (Independent) 0.1%; Joseph T. Robino (Independent) 0.1%; Michael Musmeci (Democratic) 0.1%
Mississippi	William Winter	Democratic	1979	Incumbent term-limited. New governor elected. Democratic hold.	✓ William Allain (Democratic) 55.1%; Leon Bramlett (Republican) 38.9%; Charles Evers (Independent) 4.1%; Billie H. Taylor (Independent) 1.1%; Henry McMullen Williams (Independent) 0.8%

== Kentucky ==
1983 Kentucky gubernatorial election
- November 8, 1983
- Turnout: 55.6% ▲1.3 pp
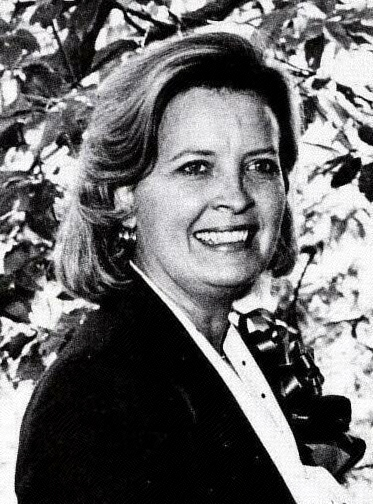

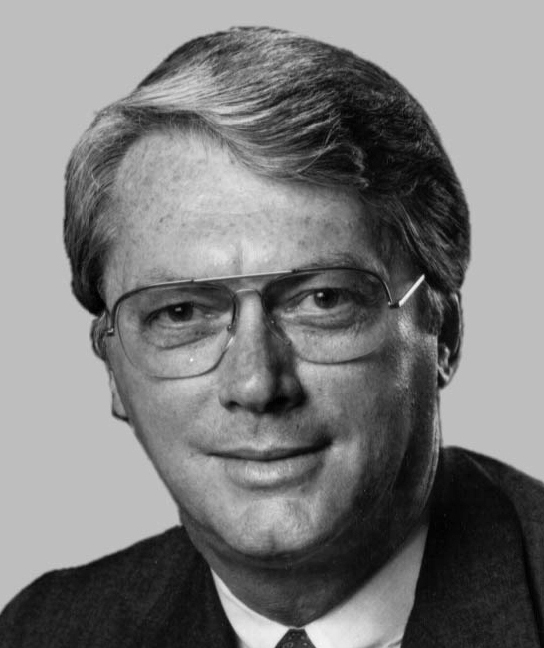
Nominee	Martha Layne Collins	Jim Bunning
Party	Democratic	Republican
Popular vote	561,674	454,650
Percentage	54.50%	44.11%
- Collins: 40–50% 50–60% 60–70% 70–80% Bunning: 40–50% 50–60% 60–70% 70–80%
Governor before election
John Y. Brown Jr.
Democratic
Elected Governor
Martha Layne Collins
Democratic

The 1983 Kentucky gubernatorial election was held on November 8, 1983. Democratic nominee Martha Layne Collins defeated Republican nominee Jim Bunning with 54.5% of the vote, replacing outgoing governor John Y. Brown Jr., and becoming the first female governor of Kentucky.

== Louisiana ==
1983 Louisiana gubernatorial election
- October 22, 1983
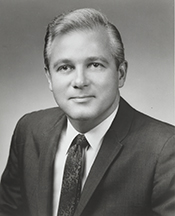

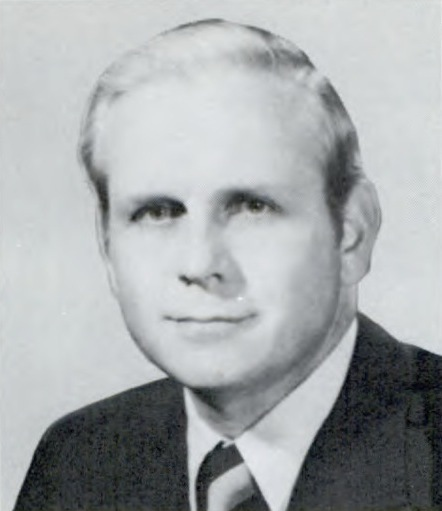
Nominee	Edwin Edwards	Dave Treen
Party	Democratic	Republican
Popular vote	1,002,798	585,692
Percentage	62.31%	36.39%
- Parish results Edwards: 50–60% 60–70% 70–80% 80–90% Treen: 50–60%
Governor before election
Dave Treen
Republican
Elected Governor
Edwin Edwards
Democratic

The 1983 Louisiana gubernatorial election was held to elect the governor of Louisiana. Incumbent Republican governor Dave Treen lost re-election to a second term, defeated by former Democratic governor Edwin Edwards. Edwards, who had previously served two consecutive terms from 1972 to 1980, became the first Louisiana governor since Earl Long to win non-consecutive terms. He went on to win a fourth term in 1991, becoming the first Louisiana governor elected to four terms.

Under Louisiana's jungle primary system, all candidates appear on the same ballot regardless of party, and voters may choose any candidate. A runoff is held if no candidate receives an absolute majority of the vote during the primary election. On October 22, 1983, Edwards and Treen took the two highest popular vote counts, but a runoff election was not held as Edwards won over 50% of the vote in the primary.

== Mississippi ==
1983 Mississippi gubernatorial election
- November 8, 1983
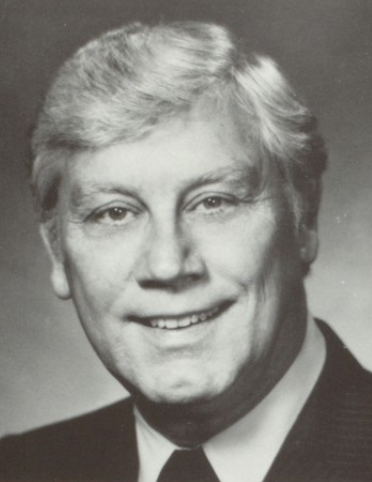

Nominee	William Allain	Leon Bramlett
Party	Democratic	Republican
Popular vote	409,209	288,764
Percentage	55.10%	38.88%
- County results Allain: 50–60% 60–70% 70–80% 80–90% Bramlett: 50–60%
Governor before election
William Winter
Democratic
Elected Governor
William Allain
Democratic

The 1983 Mississippi gubernatorial election took place on November 8, 1983, to elect the Governor of Mississippi. Incumbent Democrat William Winter was term-limited, and could not run for re-election to a second term. Democratic nominee William Allain defeated Republican Leon Bramlett.
