= George E. Harris =

American politician (1827–1911)

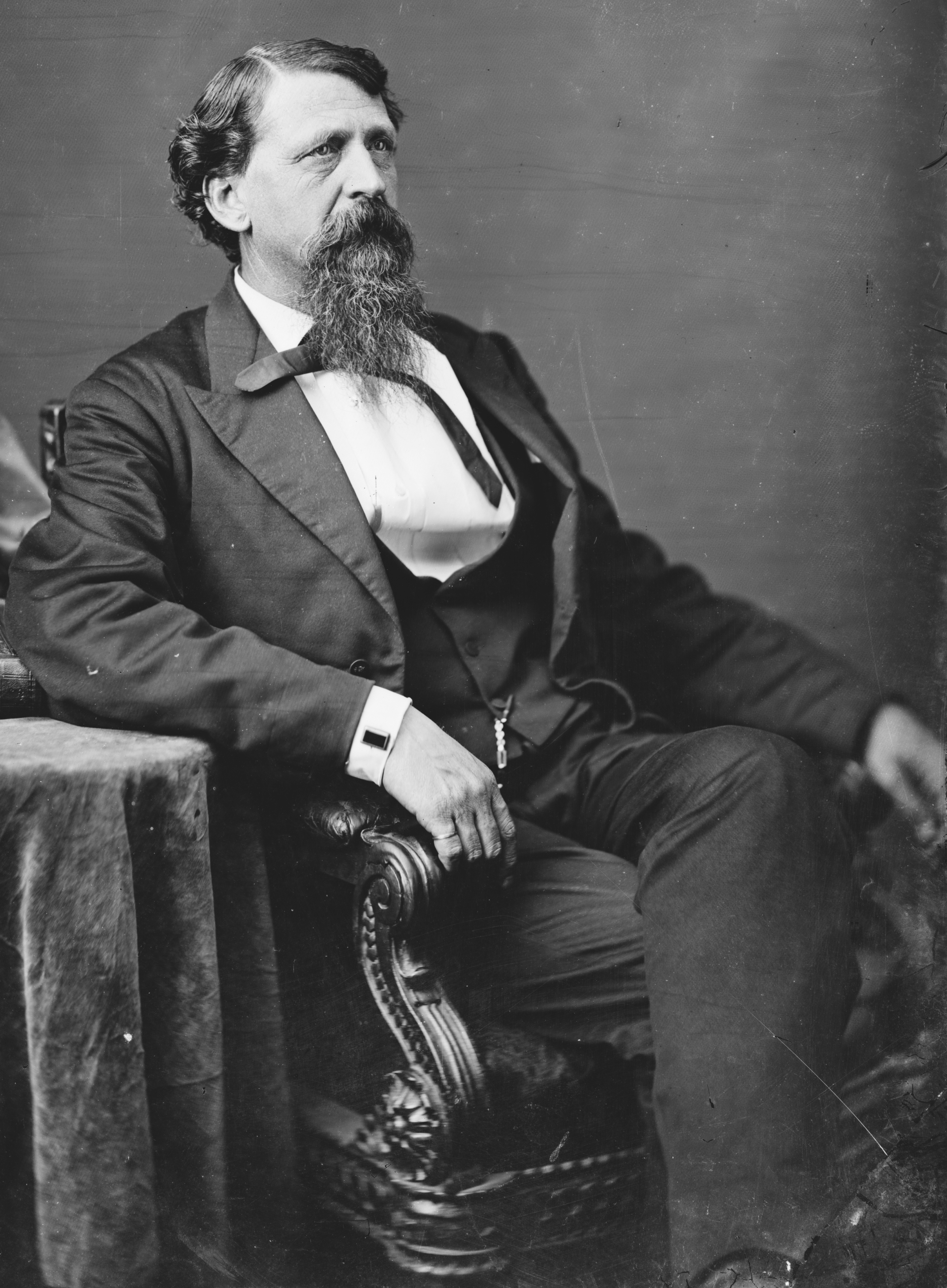
- Harris, c. 1860–1875

16th Attorney General of Mississippi
- In office January 4, 1874 – January 1878
- Governor: Adelbert Ames; John M. Stone
- Preceded by: Joshua S. Morris
- Succeeded by: Thomas C. Catchings

Member of the U.S. House of Representatives from Mississippi's 1st district
- In office February 23, 1870 – March 3, 1873
- Preceded by: vacant (secession)
- Succeeded by: Lucius Q. C. Lamar

Personal details
- Born: George Emrick Harris; January 6, 1827 Orange, North Carolina, U.S.
- Died: March 19, 1911 (aged 84) Washington, D.C., U.S.
- Resting place: Oak Hill Cemetery; Washington, D.C., U.S.
- Party: Republican
- Spouse: Harriet Seton McAllister (died)
- Children: 7

Military service
- Allegiance: Confederate States
- Branch/service: Confederate States Army
- Rank: Lieutenant colonel
- Battles/wars: American Civil War

George Emrick Harris (January 6, 1827 – March 19, 1911) was an American lawyer, Civil War veteran and politician who served two terms as a U.S. Representative from Mississippi from 1870 to 1873.

== Early life ==
George Emrick Harris was born on January 6, 1827, in Orange County, North Carolina. He moved to Tennessee and later Mississippi. He attended common schools and studied law. He was admitted to the bar in 1854.

== Career ==
Harris practiced law. He entered the Confederate States Army and served as lieutenant colonel until the close of the Civil War.

=== Political career ===
Harris was elected district attorney in 1865 and re-elected in 1866. Upon the readmission of the Mississippi to representation in the Union, he was elected as a Republican to the Forty-first and Forty-second Congresses and served from February 23, 1870, to March 3, 1873.

He succeeded Joshua Morris as the second Republican Mississippi Attorney General from 1873 to 1877 and was the last Republican elected to the position until the election of Lynn Fitch in 2019.

He wrote books on legal subjects.

=== Death and burial ===
Harris married Harriet Seton McAllister, daughter of Ward McAllister. They had seven children, including George McAllister. His wife predeceased him.

Harris died on March 19, 1911, in Washington, D.C. At the time of his death, he lived at the Ruppert Home for the Aged and Indigent. He was interred in Oak Hill Cemetery in Washington, D.C.

== Notes ==
U.S. House of Representatives
Preceded by Lucius Q. C. Lamar	Member of the U.S. House of Representatives from Mississippi's 1st congressional district 1870–1873	Succeeded by Lucius Q. C. Lamar
Legal offices
Preceded by Joshua S. Morris	Attorney General of Mississippi; 1874–1878	Succeeded by Thomas C. Catchings
