= Greek L. Rice =

American politician (1886–1950)

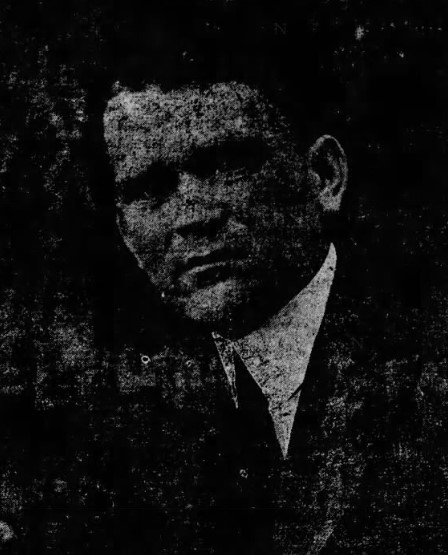

Greek Lent Rice (May 18, 1886 – February 21, 1950) was a lawyer, judge, and state legislator, who served as the Attorney General of Mississippi from 1932 until his death in 1950. He was a Democrat. He was buried at the Charleston cemetery in Charleston, Mississippi. He was succeeded by James Plemon Coleman.

Rice graduated from Mississippi College and received a law degree from Cumberland College. He served in the Mississippi House of Representatives in 1920 and 1921. He was part of a delegation of Mississippi officials that met with bankers in New York City to discuss road bonds.

Rice was attorney general when Mississippi sued in federal court over rates for intrastate trucking. He also presented an argument in a case regarding federal taxes in mineral waters from Saratoga Springs in New York.

Rice's photo along with those of other state officers appears in Mississippi Blue Book; Biennial report of the Secretary of State to the Legislature of Mississippi July 1, 1937 to July 1, 1939.

Rice died a bachelor. He had several siblings. The Mississippi Department of Archives & History has a collection of his papers.
