= Steve Patterson (politician) =

American politician

39th State Auditor of Mississippi
- In office January 9, 1992 – November 1, 1996
- Preceded by: Pete Johnson
- Succeeded by: Phil Bryant

Personal details
- Party: Democratic Party

Steven A. Patterson is an American politician who served as State Auditor of Mississippi from 1992 to 1996. A Democrat, he worked on several political campaigns in the 1970s and served as treasurer for Bill Allain's 1983 gubernatorial campaign. With Allain's backing, Patterson assumed the chairmanship of the Mississippi Democratic Party, which he held until 1987.

In 1991 Patterson ran for the office of state auditor. Taking office in 1992, he secured law enforcement powers for some the employees of his office and gained authorization to conduct performance audits of state agencies. He was reelected in 1995, but resigned the following year after he came under investigation for several instances of malfeasance. In 2006, he joined a law firm, despite not being a lawyer. In 2008 he pled guilty to a charge of conspiracy to bribe an elected official.

== Early life ==
Steve Patterson was raised in Union County, Mississippi. He earned a master's degree from the University of Southern Mississippi and married a woman, Debbie, with whom he had two sons. He later became an investment banker in Jackson.

== Political career ==
=== Early activities ===
A Democrat, Patterson worked for Charles L. Sullivan's 1971 gubernatorial campaign. He then worked for William F. Winter's 1975 gubernatorial campaign and managed John Arthur Eaves' 1979 gubernatorial campaign. After Eaves was eliminated in the Democratic primary, Patterson campaigned for Winter. He later worked as an aide for Governor Winter and Senator John Stennis. He served as the treasurer for William Allain's 1983 gubernatorial campaign. With Allain's backing, he was elected chairman of the Mississippi Democratic Party on May 26, 1984 by the party's executive committee and served in that role until his resignation in November 1987. In 1984 he was the first non-black recipient of the National Association for the Advancement of Colored People's Medgar Evers Award. In 1988 he ran for the U.S. House of Representatives seat for Mississippi's 4th congressional district, placing third in the Democratic primary.

=== State Auditor ===
Patterson ran for the office of State Auditor of Mississippi in 1991. He advanced into a Democratic runoff primary with lawyer Ryan Hood and won, facing no challenge in the general election. Assuming the auditor's office on January 9, 1992, he pushed for reforms in state government that had been advocated by his predecessors. In January 1993 he released a book, Stop the Waste, which detailed suggested cost-saving measures. That year he convinced the Mississippi State Legislature to grant some employees in the auditor's office's investigative division law enforcement powers. He later gained statutory authority to conduct performance audits of state agencies and in February 1995 his office published such an audit, which included recommended reforms he claimed could save the state $650 million by 2000. The audit was largely ignored by the governor and the State Legislature. He won re-election in 1995.

In July 1996 the head of the Department of Audit's investigative branch, Danny Banks, was indicted on embezzlement charges. While investigating Banks, the office of the Attorney General of Mississippi discovered that Patterson had used a forged letter to acquire a license plate for his car in 1995 to avoid paying back taxes on it. He claimed in the falsified letter that the car had not been operated on public roads between October 1993 and February 1995 (thus not being charged taxes for that time period), even though his wife had been involved in an accident while driving the vehicle in 1994. Patterson later paid the necessary taxes for the vehicle, but by August 1996 he was under investigation from the attorney general's office, the state highway patrol, and the Federal Bureau of Investigation (FBI) for various activities, including benefiting from the use of funds embezzled by Banks and potentially profiting from the actions of a former business associate. On October 10, 1996, he declared that he would resign effective November 1 and plead guilty to the misdemeanor charge of filing a false affidavit to keep from paying county taxes through the purchase of a license plate. Entering his guilty plea on October 18, he was sentenced to pay a $1,020 fine. He became the first Mississippi statewide official to resign from office in decades. Governor Kirk Fordice appointed Phil Bryant as his successor.

== Later life ==
In 2006 Patterson and lawyer Tim Balducci founded Patterson Balducci PLLC, a law firm, in New Albany, Mississippi. The two also created Patterson, Balducci, & Biden PLLC in Washington D.C. and recruited additional partners but struggled to gain casework. Patterson was not a lawyer, and the Mississippi Rules of Professional Conduct stipulated that only lawyers could be named partners at firms that performed legal services. The president of the Union County bar association wrote to The Mississippi Bar on several occasions to report the apparent rules breach. Patterson affirmed that he was not an attorney but denied any malfeasance. The Mississippi Bar instructed Balducci to ensure that Patterson was not being advertised to the public as one of the New Albany firm's attorneys, but additional allegations of the potential unauthorized practice of law led the bar to direct a committee to conduct a full investigation. In September the committee concluded that Patterson had engaged in unauthorized practice.

In 2007, trial lawyer Richard Scruggs attempted to bribe a state circuit court judge to secure a favorable outcome in a ruling on the payment of legal fees. The judge alerted the FBI, which launched an investigation and arrested Scruggs and several others involved in the case, including Patterson and Balducci, who prosecutors accused of assisting in offering the bribe. Balducci resigned from the Mississippi Bar, thereby terminating its investigation into Patterson's activities, though Balducci acknowledged his partner's unauthorized practice of law in his letter of resignation. Patterson pled guilty to a charge of conspiracy to bribe an elected official on January 15, 2008 and agreed to cooperate with authorities in exchange for a lighter sentence. On February 14, 2009, Patterson was sentenced to two years of incarceration and ordered to pay a $150,000 fine. His sentence was reduced for good behavior and he was released on December 19, 2010.

On April 29, 2026, Patterson revealed that he was the "undisclosed family friend" who adopted Major, one of former President Joe Biden's German Shepherds, after he struggled to adapt to life in the White House. In a column for NEMiss.news, an online news site for northeast Mississippi where he is a regular contributor, Patterson said he met Biden in 1973, soon after he was sworn in to the U.S. Senate. Patterson was a junior staffer for Stennis at the time. He wrote of their close friendship:

I have stayed in the Biden families’ homes many times, and they have stayed with me on several occasions. I’ve been honored to be their guest at family affairs where I was the only person present who did not have Biden as a last name. I was the first state Democratic Party chair to endorse his candidacy for the Presidency in 1988 and served as his southern campaign coordinator. I have raised money for each of his races and traveled all over the country with him, speaking on his behalf. In short, we have shared life’s ups and downs for over 50 years.

Their friendship was strained after Biden assumed the presidency, which Patterson wrote "often leaves no room for old friends, because friends associated with the political role take up all the air."

== Works cited ==
- Crockett, James R. (2003). Operation Pretense: The FBI's Sting on County Corruption in Mississippi. Jackson: University Press of Mississippi. ISBN 9781578064960.
- Crockett, James R. (2007). Hands in the Till: Embezzlement of Public Monies in Mississippi. University Press of Mississippi. ISBN 9781578069354.
- Crockett, James R. (2014). Power, Greed, and Hubris: Judicial Bribery in Mississippi (reprint ed.). University Press of Mississippi. ISBN 9781617039188.
- Nash, Jere; Taggart, Andy (2009). Mississippi Politics: The Struggle for Power, 1976-2008 (second ed.). University Press of Mississippi. ISBN 9781604733570.

Party political offices
Preceded by Pete Johnson	Democratic nominee for State Auditor of Mississippi; 1991, 1995	Succeeded by Rod Nixon
