= King Edward Hotel (Jackson, Mississippi) =

- Edwards Hotel
- U.S. National Register of Historic Places
- Mississippi Landmark
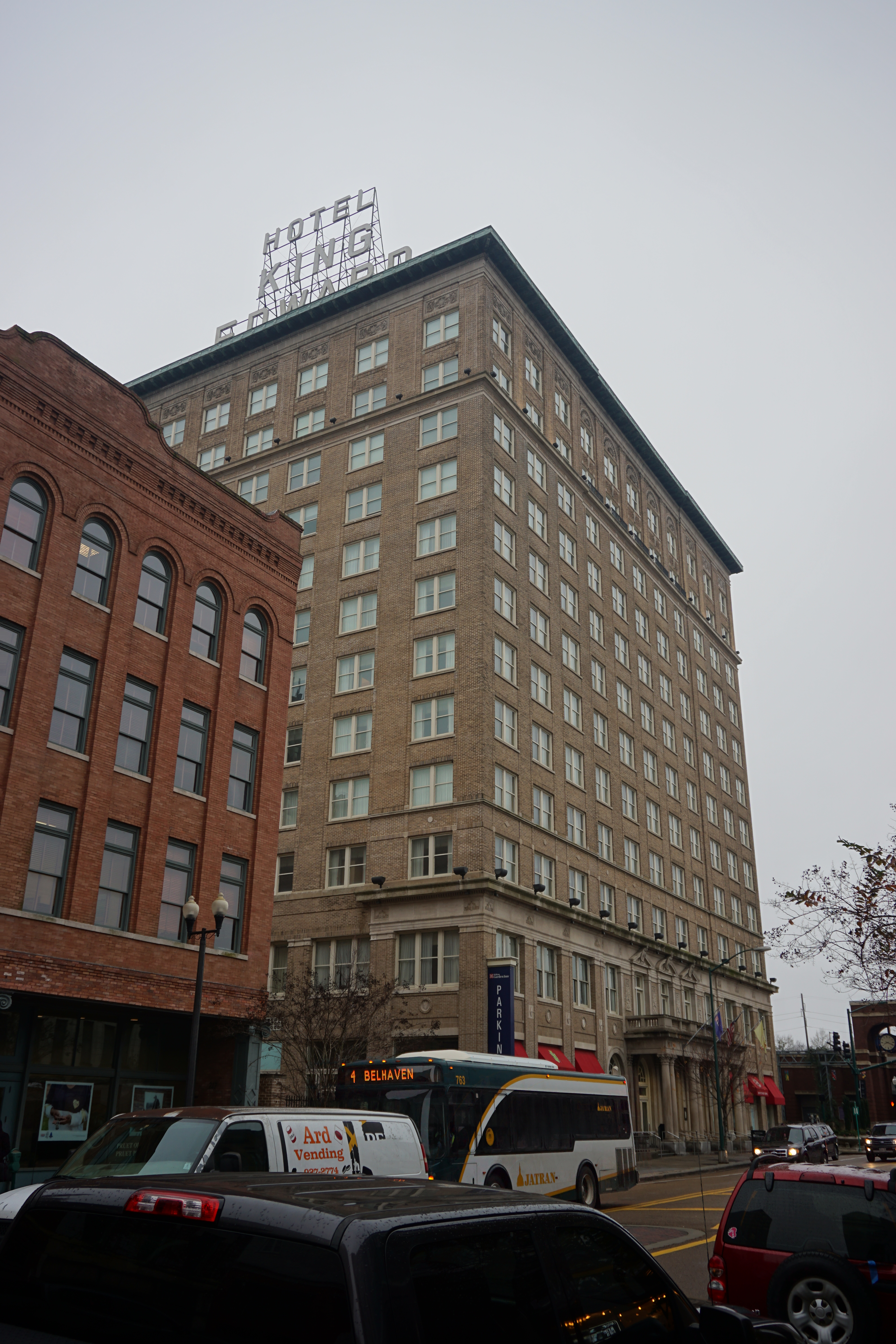
- King Edward Hotel in Jackson, Mississippi

- Location within Mississippi Location within the United States
- Location: Jackson, Mississippi
- Coordinates: 32°17′59″N 90°11′25″W
- Built: 1923
- Architect: Nolan, William T.
- NRHP reference No.: 76001096
- USMS No.: 049-JAC-0095.1-NR-ML

Significant dates
- Added to NRHP: November 7, 1976
- Designated USMS: November 14, 1990

The King Edward Hotel, built in 1923 as the Edwards Hotel, is an historic hotel in downtown Jackson, Mississippi. The second of two buildings located on the site at the corner of Capitol and Mill Streets, it was closed and vacant for nearly 40 years before renovations began in 2006. The hotel was listed on the National Register of Historic Places in 1976, and declared a Mississippi Landmark in 1990. It was restored from 2007-2009 as a combination of apartments and the Hilton Garden Inn Jackson Downtown, which opened on December 17, 2009. It features the King Edward Grill, King Edward Bar, Pavilion Pantry convenience mart, a fitness center and formerly a Seattle's Best Coffee shop.

== History ==
The original hotel on the site, known as the Confederate House, was built in 1861 by "Major" R.O. Edwards. It was destroyed in the Civil War in 1863. Major Edwards built a new hotel on the site, the Edwards House, which opened in 1867. This structure was replaced in 1923 by the present building, a 12-story beige brick structure, designed in the Beaux-Arts architecture style by New Orleans architect William Nolan. The hotel opened as the Edwards Hotel on December 29, 1923, and was the center of Jackson society and politics for over forty years.

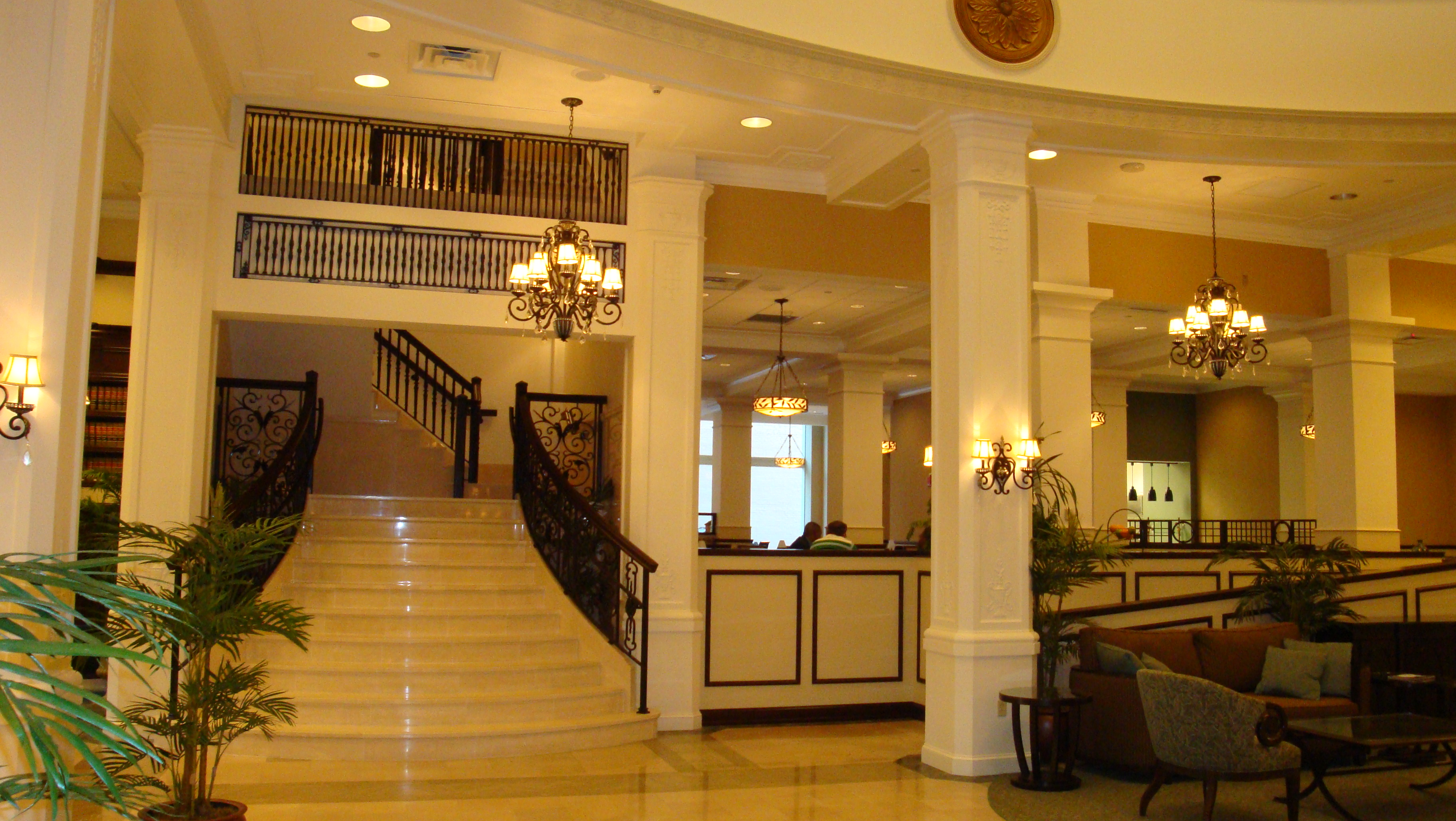
The restored lobby today

A room at the hotel was used by Okeh Records to record a number of important blues sessions in December 1930. It was in front of the hotel that Jessie Lee Garner was attacked by a white man on a Jackson city bus.

In 1954, the hotel was purchased by R.E. "Dumas" Milner, a wealthy automobile dealer and businessman. Milner renovated the hotel in the popular modernist style of the day and renamed it the King Edward Hotel. Many of the original details were obscured in the renovations. The hotel closed in 1967 after years of declining occupancy rates.

Standard Life bought the building in 1976 and got it placed on the National Register of Historic Places. The company sold it to private developers for half a million dollars in 1981. While a number of attempts to restore the building had proven ineffective and demolition of the building continued to be considered by Jackson city leadership, a workable plan was finally agreed upon. The former Mayor of Jackson, Harvey Johnson Jr., called the renovation of the hotel the "linchpin" in attempts to revitalize the downtown of the city.

In December 2006, Watkins Partners, former New Orleans Saints running back Deuce McAllister and Historic Restoration Inc. of New Orleans formed a partnership to restore the King Edward. It reopened its doors as the Hilton Garden Inn-Jackson Downtown in December 2009 with 186 hotel rooms, 64 luxury apartments, a signature restaurant, bar coffee shop and some retail space. The interior renovation of the historic hotel, designed by Thomas Hamilton & Associates of Richmond, Virginia, incorporates Hilton brand design requirements into the existing hotel, while preserving some of the original historic architectural elements as part of the hotel project. The renovation began in November, 2007 and was completed in December, 2009, at a cost of $90 million.
