= Joseph Turner Patterson =

Mississippi Attorney General (1907–1969)

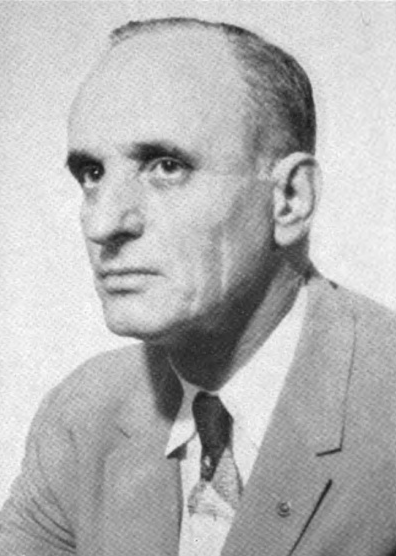

34th Attorney General of Mississippi
- In office January 18, 1956 – April 19, 1969
- Governor: James P. Coleman; Ross Barnett; Paul B. Johnson Jr. John Bell Williams
- Preceded by: James P. Coleman
- Succeeded by: A. F. Summer

Personal details
- Born: July 10, 1907 Eupora, Mississippi
- Died: April 19, 1969 (aged 61)
- Cause of death: Stroke
- Party: Democratic
- Parents: Albert Thomas "Abb" Paterson (father); Mae Vivian Harpole (mother)
- Education: Mississippi A&M; Mississippi College; Cumberland University Law School LLB 1929
- Known for: Role in Civil Rights

Joseph Turner Patterson (1907–1969) was the thirty-fourth Attorney General of Mississippi.

== Early life and education ==
Patterson was born July 10, 1907, in Eupora, Mississippi.

== Public service ==
In 1930, Patterson was elected city attorney of Calhoun, Mississippi. In 1932, he was elected to the Mississippi House of Representatives. In 1936, he joined the staff of Senator Pat Harrison.

In 1962, Patterson cooperated with the Kennedy administration to register James Meredith to attend Ole Miss.

In 1968, he represented the state's interests in Coffey v. State Educational Finance Commission. This case marked the end of state subsidies to segregation academies.

Legal offices
Preceded by James P. Coleman	Attorney General of Mississippi; January 18, 1956–April 19, 1969	Succeeded by Albioun Fernando Summer
