= Chris Masingill =

American politician

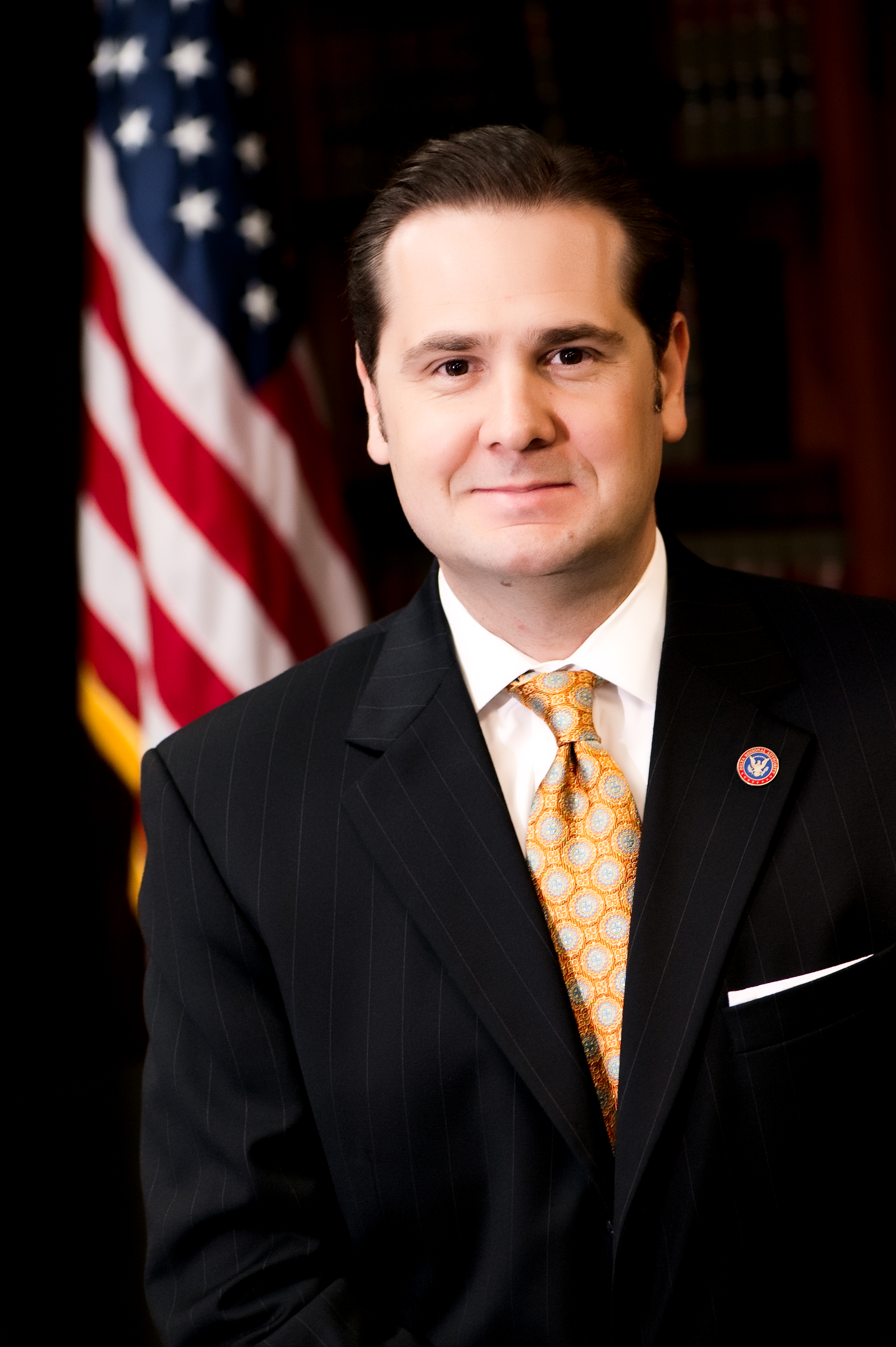

Federal Co-Chair of the Delta Regional Authority
- In office June 24, 2010 – July 28, 2017
- Preceded by: Pete Johnson
- Succeeded by: Christopher Caldwell

Personal details
- Born: 1973 (age 52–53) Texas
- Party: Democratic
- Education: Texas Wesleyan University (B.S.)

Chris Masingill is an American official who served as the second Federal Co-Chair of the Delta Regional Authority.

== Early life and career ==
Chris Masingill was born 1973 in Texas. His family later moved to Morrilton, Arkansas. He returned to Texas to attend Texas Wesleyan University where he became involved in politics. In 1998, he worked for the campaign of Blanche Lincoln, joining her staff after she won the election. Shortly after, he worked on the campaign of Mike Ross. Afterwards, he served as Ross's district director for four years. In 2006, served as the campaign manager for Mike Beebe's successful gubernatorial campaign. He then worked for the Beebe administration, which included implementation of the American Recovery and Reinvestment Act of 2009.

In 2008, Masingill attended the Democratic National Convention as a delegate for the presidential campaign of Hillary Clinton.

== Delta Regional Authority ==
In 2010, Barack Obama appointed Masingill to be the Federal Co-Chair of the Delta Regional Authority. Masingill came out against a Trump Administration budget proposal which would abolish the DRA. In July 2017, President Donald Trump fired Masingill from his role. On September 12, 2017, Trump nominated Christopher Caldwell, a staffer to Senator John Boozman. Caldwell was later confirmed by the United States Senate and took office January 12, 2018.

== Post-federal service ==
On May 22, 2018, it was reported that Masingill had been appointed to lead the economic development efforts of the St. Tammany Development District, a state created entity centered on St. Tammany Parish, Louisiana in the New Orleans metropolitan area.
