= A. F. Summer =

American politician

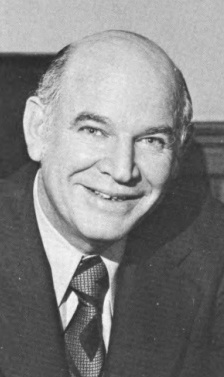

35th Attorney General of Mississippi
- In office April 24, 1969 – January 22, 1980
- Governor: John Bell Williams; Bill Waller; Cliff Finch
- Preceded by: Joseph Turner Patterson
- Succeeded by: William Allain

Personal details
- Born: Albioun Fernando Summer; November 2, 1921; Pelahatchie, Mississippi
- Died: November 19, 1981 (aged 60); Jackson, Mississippi
- Political party: Democratic

Albioun Fernando Summer (November 2, 1921 – November 19, 1981) was an American politician who served as the Attorney General of Mississippi from 1969 to 1980.

He died of a heart attack on November 19, 1981, in Jackson, Mississippi at age 60.
