= Pete Johnson (politician) =

American politician (1948–2025)

1st Federal Co-Chairman of the Delta Regional Authority
- In office 2002–2011
- Preceded by: Office established
- Succeeded by: Chris Masingill

38th State Auditor of Mississippi
- In office January 7, 1988 – 1992
- Preceded by: Ray Mabus
- Succeeded by: Steve Patterson

Personal details
- Born: Patrick Hayes Johnson Jr. May 12, 1948 Alexandria, Louisiana, U.S.
- Died: January 20, 2025 (aged 76) Memphis, Tennessee, U.S.
- Party: Republican (after 1989); Democratic (until 1989)
- Relations: Paul B. Johnson Sr. (grandfather); Paul B. Johnson Jr. (uncle)
- Education: University of Mississippi (B.A.); Mississippi College (J.D.)

Patrick Hayes "Pete" Johnson Jr. (May 12, 1948 – January 20, 2025) was an American politician and lawyer who served as State Auditor of Mississippi from 1988 to 1992. Originally a Democrat, he joined the Republican Party in 1989, thus becoming the first Republican to hold statewide office in Mississippi since the Reconstruction era. He mounted an unsuccessful campaign for governor in 1991. He served as Federal Co-Chairman of the Delta Regional Authority from 2002 to 2011.

== Early life ==
Patrick Hayes "Pete" Johnson Jr. was born on May 12, 1948, in Alexandria, Louisiana. Both his grandfather, Paul B. Johnson Sr., and uncle, Paul B. Johnson Jr., served as Governor of Mississippi. He graduated from Murrah High School in Jackson, Mississippi, in 1966. He earned a bachelor's degree in business administration from the University of Mississippi in 1971 and a Juris Doctor degree from Jackson School of Law in 1974. Johnson thereafter joined the Bank of Clarksdale as a senior vice president and also served as president of the Young Bankers Section of the Mississippi Bankers Association. He then formed a financial planning firm. He married Margaret Birdsong and had two daughters with her. While working as an ambulance driver in the 1960s, he contracted hepatitis C, for which he was formally diagnosed in 1987.

== Political career ==
=== Early activities and state auditor tenure ===
Johnson was initially a member of the Democratic Party. He twice ran to represent Mississippi's 2nd congressional district in the U.S. House of Representatives, in 1982 and 1986, in both instances losing in the Democratic primaries to Robert G. Clark Jr. and Mike Espy, respectively. In 1984, Governor William Allain appointed him Chair of the Mississippi Marketing Council. On May 28, 1987, he declared his candidacy for the office of State Auditor. He secured the Democratic nomination after defeating Al Gary in a primary runoff in late August and defeated Republican city councilman Danny Ware in the November general election.

Incumbent auditor Ray Mabus was elected Governor the same election. During his tenure, Mabus had collaborated with the Federal Bureau of Investigation on a corruption investigation into Mississippi county governments—known as Operation Pretense—and pushed for various reforms to reduce official malfeasance. Before taking office, Johnson appointed a Committee on Reform of County Government. He assumed the auditor's office on January 7, 1988. Early on in his tenure, he continued the anti-corruption efforts of his predecessor, warning county boards of supervisors about misuse of resources and threatening to claw back misspent funds, though by early May he had announced that he would wait for outstanding legal issues surrounding purchasing standards to be settled before seeking more claw backs.

Johnson's reform committee compiled a report suggesting structural issues with the beat system of county government and advising counties to transition to a unit form of government. (Note: Under the beat system, each supervisor on a given board is responsible for managing road construction in their assigned district, or beat. Under the unit system, road construction considerations are handled in a centralized manner by the entire board of supervisors and a county administrator and road manager. At the time, many complaints of corruption in Mississippi county governments stemmed from alleged misuse of county road crews and materials, such as by graveling private driveways.) While Mabus pushed for state unit legislation which would mandate that county road construction would be considered in a unified, professional manner, Johnson appealed to the county supervisors to voluntarily commit to centralized management of road construction. The two men entered a dispute when Johnson released a report predicting that switching to unit forms of government would be expensive for counties; Mabus accused him of inflating the projections. A referendum was held in November 1988 which led to several counties voting to switch to unit systems. The auditor's office was tasked with overseeing the transition and Johnson threatened to cut off funds from Tallahatchie County to ensure its supervisors' compliance.

=== Party switch and gubernatorial campaign ===
In early 1989, Johnson announced he was joining the Republican Party, thus making him the first Republican to hold statewide office in Mississippi since the Reconstruction era. He later attributed his decision to switch to the election of moderate Republican George H. W. Bush to the presidency, as well as encouragement from U.S. Senator Thad Cochran. He was invited alongside other party switchers to visit Bush at the White House in May. In 1991, he declared his candidacy for governor and contested for the Republican nomination. As the Republican Party lacked available candidates, no Republican was nominated to contest for the office of auditor in the general election. Johnson was viewed as the early favorite to win the gubernatorial nomination, and thus most of the television ads he aired early in the campaign focused on Mabus instead of his primary opposition. In the Republican primary he faced Kirk Fordice, a conservative contractor who had been active in Republican politics since the 1960s, and Bobby Clanton, a social conservative activist. Fordice characterized Johnson as a "professional politician". Johnson struggled physically throughout the campaign as symptoms from his hepatitis C affliction—which he kept secret—intensified. The race for the Republican nomination went to a runoff on October 8. Fordice won with 60.6 percent of the vote, while Johnson only earned 39.4 percent. Fordice went on to defeat Mabus in the general election. Johnson later reflected, "It was not meant for me to be governor".

== Later life and death ==
After Johnson left office, he began working in the Mississippi office of the Farmers Home Administration and opened a legal practice in Clarksdale. President George H. W. Bush appointed him state director of the Farmers Home Administration in July 1992. He held the office until Bill Clinton became president in January 1993. He purchased a former motel in Flowood and began leasing it to the state's Department of Corrections as a minimum security women's prison in May 1994. He underwent a liver transplant in 1996 to ameliorate his hepatitis C affliction. In March 2001, President George W. Bush appointed him to become the first Federal Co-Chairman of the Delta Regional Authority. Confirmed by the U.S. Senate in September, he served in the role from 2002 to 2011.

Johnson died at Baptist Memorial Hospital in Memphis, Tennessee, on January 20, 2025, at the age of 76.

== Sources ==
- Crockett, James R. (2003). Operation Pretense: The FBI's Sting on County Corruption in Mississippi. Jackson: University Press of Mississippi. ISBN 9781578064960.
- Krane, Dale; Shaffer, Stephen D. (1992). Mississippi Government and Politics: Modernizers Versus Traditionalists. University of Nebraska Press. ISBN 9780803277588.
- Lamis, Alexander P., ed. (1999). Southern Politics in the 1990s. Louisiana State University Press. ISBN 9780807166765.
- Nash, Jere; Taggart, Andy (2009). Mississippi Politics: The Struggle for Power, 1976-2008 (second ed.). University Press of Mississippi. ISBN 9781604733570.

Political offices
Preceded by Ray Mabus	State Auditor of Mississippi; 1988–1992	Succeeded by Steve Patterson
Office established	Federal Co-Chairman of the Delta Regional Authority; 2002–2011	Succeeded by Chris Masingill
