= 1987 Mississippi gubernatorial election =

- November 3, 1987
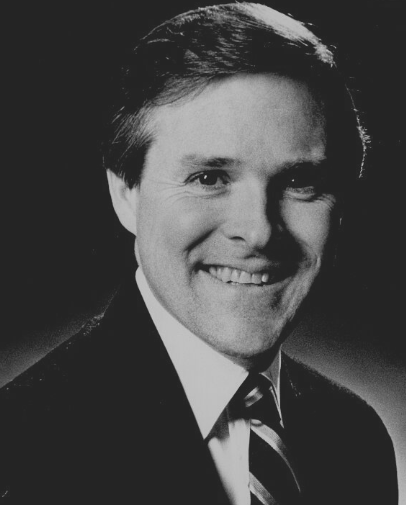

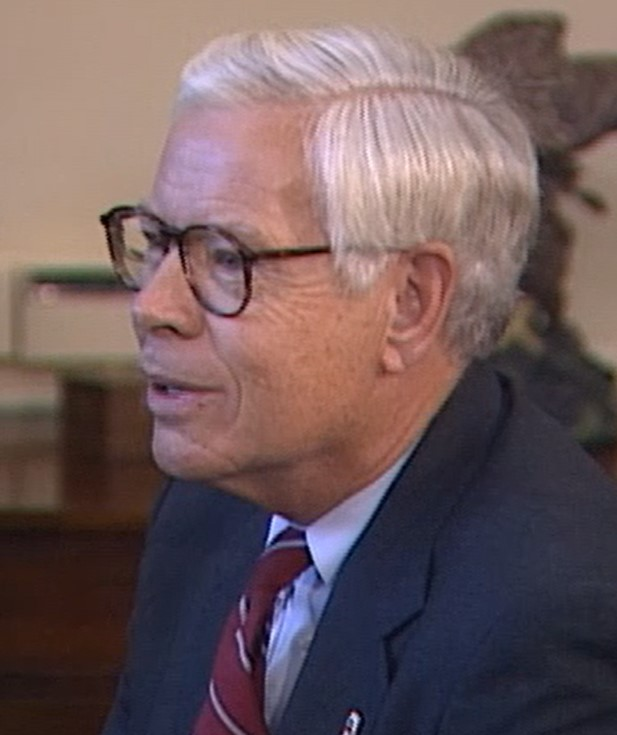
| Nominee | Ray Mabus | Jack Reed |
| Party | Democratic | Republican |
| Popular vote | 385,689 | 336,006 |
| Percentage | 53.44% | 46.56% |
- County results Mabus: 50–60% 60–70% 70–80% 80–90% Reed: 50–60% 60–70%
Governor before election
William Allain
Democratic
Elected Governor
Ray Mabus
Democratic

The 1987 Mississippi gubernatorial election took place on November 3, 1987 to elect the governor of Mississippi.

This is the most recent Mississippi gubernatorial election in which the Democratic candidate received a majority of votes. In January 2000, Ronnie Musgrove was elected by the Mississippi House of Representatives after neither he nor Republican Mike Parker received a majority in the 1999 general election.

== Democratic primary ==
No candidate received a majority in the Democratic primary, which featured 7 contenders, so a runoff was held between the top two candidates. The runoff election was won by State Auditor Ray Mabus, who defeated cotton farmer and businessman Mike Sturdivant.

=== Results ===
Mississippi Democratic gubernatorial primary, 1987
| Party | Candidate | Votes | % |
|---|---|---|---|
| Democratic | Ray Mabus | 304,559 | 37.69 |
| Democratic | Mike Sturdivant | 131,180 | 16.24 |
| Democratic | Bill Waller | 105,056 | 13.00 |
| Democratic | John Arthur Eaves | 98,517 | 12.19 |
| Democratic | Maurice Dantin | 83,603 | 10.35 |
| Democratic | Ed Pittman | 73,667 | 9.12 |
| Democratic | Gilbert Fountain | 5,990 | 0.74 |
| Total votes | | 802,572 | 100.00 |

=== Runoff ===
Runoff results by county Mabus: 50–60%; 60–70%; 70–80%; Sturdivant: 50–60%; 60–70%

Mississippi Democratic gubernatorial primary runoff, 1987
| Party | Candidate | Votes | % |
|---|---|---|---|
| Democratic | Ray Mabus | 473,321 | 64.74% |
| Democratic | Mike Sturdivant | 257,761 | 35.26% |
| Total votes | | 731,082 | 100.00% |

== Republican primary ==
Businessman and State Board of Education member Jack Reed won the Republican primary, defeating Doug Lemon.

=== Results ===
Mississippi Republican gubernatorial primary, 1987
| Party | Candidate | Votes | % |
|---|---|---|---|
| Republican | Jack Reed | 14,798 | 78.48 |
| Republican | Doug Lemon | 4,057 | 21.52 |
| Total votes | | 18,855 | 100.00 |

== General election ==
=== Campaign ===
National Republicans considered Mississippi's 1987 gubernatorial contest a major target for them, and they devoted significant financial resources to Jack Reed's campaign.

At 39 years of age, Ray Mabus defeated Tupelo businessman Reed in the 1987 gubernatorial election by 53% to 47%, becoming the youngest governor in the United States. He won "on a wave of black votes" (black voters made up about 30 percent of the state's registered voters) and lost the white vote "by about 3 to 2" despite support from what a coalition one Democratic state chairman described as "poor whites" and yuppies. Mabus, who ran on the slogan "Mississippi Will Never Be Last Again", was billed as "the face of the New South", much like his counterpart in Arkansas at the time, Bill Clinton. Mabus was featured in a 1988 New York Times Magazine cover story titled "The Yuppies of Mississippi; How They Took Over the Statehouse".

=== Results ===
Mississippi gubernatorial election, 1987
| Party | Candidate | Votes | % |
|---|---|---|---|
| Democratic | Ray Mabus | 385,689 | 53.44% |
| Republican | Jack Reed | 336,006 | 46.56% |
| Total votes | | 721,695 | 100.00 |
| Democratic hold | | | |
