= Monroe McClurg =

American lawyer (1857–1925)

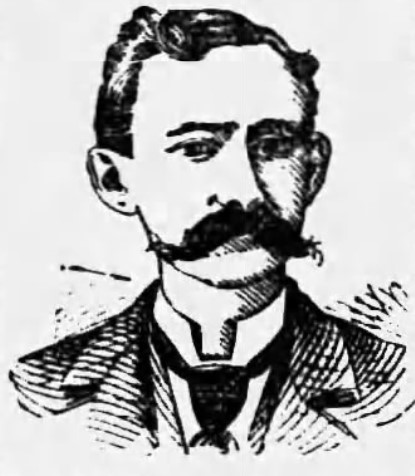

Monroe McClurg (March 19, 1857- April 1925) was a lawyer who served as Attorney General of Mississippi from 1900-1903. He also served in the state legislature. While serving as Attorney General he was a member of the State House Commission.

He was born in Vaiden, Mississippi where he established a law practice. He eventually relocated his home and business to Greenwood, Mississippi. He married and had two daughters and a son, who was named after him. He was reportedly introduced once as "the red-headed Scotch-Irish Democrat."

He wrote The Courts, the Bench and the Bar of Mississippi. He also authored The State of Louisiana Versus the State of Mississippi; Disputed Boundary in the Waters of the Gulf of Mexico. Original Suit in the Supreme Court of the United States. March 19, 1924, he addressed law school students at the University of Mississippi.
