= Leon Bramlett =

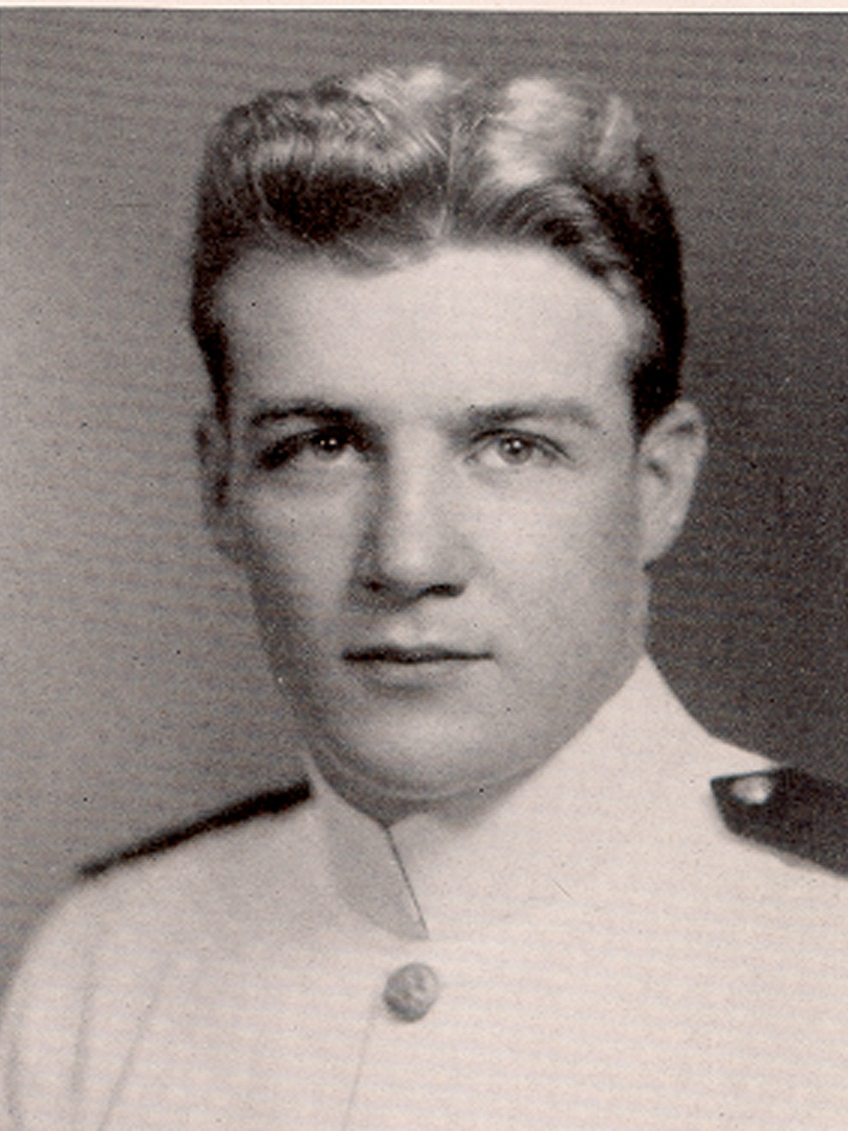
Leon Bramlett

Leon Crow Bramlett Jr. (September 17, 1923 – October 19, 2015) was an American farmer, football player, and politician. Born in Clarksdale, Mississippi, he briefly played football at the University of Mississippi and the University of Alabama before being admitted to the U.S. Naval Academy, where he played from 1943 to 1947. He briefly worked as an end coach for the team while serving in the United States Marine Corps before returning to Clarksdale to farm cotton. He served on the Mississippi Marketing Council and chaired the Mississippi Democratic Party from 1968 to 1972, during a time when the party was split between conservative "Regulars", including Bramlett, and pro-civil rights "Loyalists". In 1976 the Regulars and the Loyalists reached a compromise and in response Bramlett joined the Republican Party. He lost the 1979 Republican gubernatorial primary in Mississippi but secured the nomination four years later before losing in the general election. He retired from farming in 2001 and served on U.S. Senator Thad Cochran's staff for several years, dying in 2015.

== Early life ==
Bramlett was born on September 17, 1923, in Clarksdale, Mississippi, United States to Leon Crow Bramlett Sr. and Elizabeth Jones Bramlett. He graduated from Clarksdale High School in 1941. Bramlett played on the football team of the University of Mississippi in 1941, the University of Alabama in 1942, and the U.S. Naval Academy from 1943 to 1947. He was declared an All-America player in 1944 and 1945 and served as captain of the academy's team in 1946. He learned to box from an oil mill employee who worked for his father, and won the academy heavyweight boxing championship in 1943. He decided not to pursue a professional football career after sustaining a knee injury for which he was hospitalized in 1946. Graduating from the Naval Academy in 1947, he was stationed at Quantico, Virginia. In 1948 he was made end coach under head coach George Sauer, and served in that role until 1949. He served in the United States Marine Corps for two years and married Virginia McGehee in 1947. He was inducted into the Mississippi Sports Hall of Fame in 1988.

== Political career ==
Bramlett returned to Clarksdale in 1950 and became a cotton farmer. By 1989 he had amassed 3,000 acres of farmland in the Clarksdale area and farmed an additional 1,000 rented acres. Garnering an interest in politics, he served on the Mississippi Marketing Council and chaired the Mississippi Democratic Party from 1968 to 1972. His leadership coincided with a time of division in the party between the more conservative "Regulars" and the black-dominated "Loyalists"; Bramlett was a Regular. He led the Regular delegation to the 1968 Democratic National Convention, but the convention credentials committee rejected the Regulars and sat the Loyalists delegation instead. He co-founded the Lee Academy, a segregation academy, and presided over its school board from 1970 to 1979. In 1976 the Regulars and the Loyalists reached a compromise and agreed to jointly-select their next national delegation. In response, Bramlett joined the Republican Party, saying, "The Democratic Party which I knew and worked for no longer exists. There is no room in the new united party for people like me, for we are not willing to embrace the philosophy of the national Democratic Party and abandon the principles that made this country great." He co-chaired Gerald Ford's 1976 presidential campaign in Mississippi.

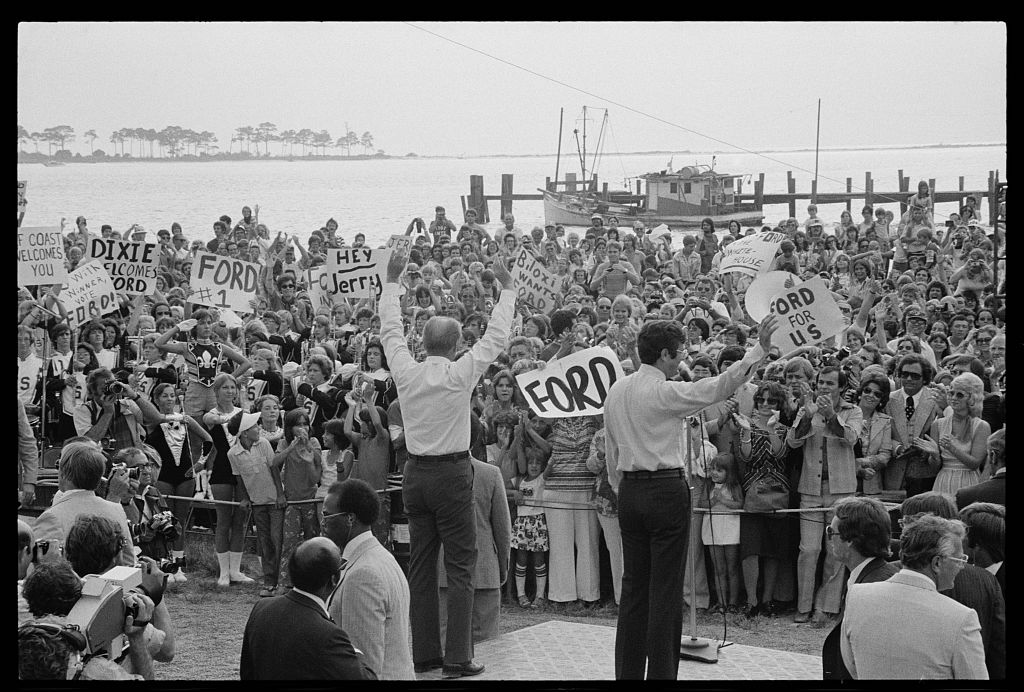
Bramlett co-chaired Gerald Ford's 1976 presidential campaign in Mississippi.

Moderate Republican Gil Carmichael decided to run for governor in 1979 after a failed bid in 1975. More conservative Mississippi Republicans who blamed Carmichael for losing the 1975 race thought he should not run again and recruited Bramlett to run in the Republican primary. Bramlett was convinced that "Gil could not win in November" and styled himself as the "conservative alternative" to Carmichael. Carmichael ultimately had better name recognition and prevailed in the primary, taking 17,216 votes to his opponent's 15,236. Bramlett co-chaired Ronald Reagan's presidential campaign in Mississippi in 1980.

In 1983 Bramlett, at the behest of Republican leaders, reluctantly entered that year's gubernatorial race and secured the Republican nomination unopposed to face Democrat William Allain in the general election. Early polls indicated that Allain had a large lead. During the campaign Bramlett attacked Allain for being a "bachelor" and emphasized that he was "blessed" with a wife and children and thus more qualified to manage education and healthcare issues. Allain accused Bramlett making "smears and innuendo" and of rumor–mongering, and emphasized that he had once had three step-children through his previous marriage.

Meanwhile, three Republican oil company executives, having heard rumors that Allain regularly solicited sex from black transvestites, decided to enlist attorney Bill Spell and a private detective agency to investigate the veracity of the claims. The attorney and detectives interviewed three black transvestites who testified that they had sex with Allain and repairmen from his former apartment complex who said they had seen gay pornography in his unit. The oil executives informed Bramlett of their findings, but he expressed disbelief at the allegations and refused to support their efforts. After failed attempts to get the media to report the story, Spell held a press conference on October 25 to publicly reveal the allegations, noting that the claims were supported by the three transvestites—who had undergone polygraph examinations—and by police officers who had reported witnessing Allain attempt to solicit transvestite prostitutes in the Farish Street District of Jackson. Allain denounced the allegations as "malicious lies", denied knowing the three transvestites, and said, "I'm no sexual deviate and Leon Bramlett knows it." Bramlett distanced himself from the attorney and oil executives, maintaining that he had no involvement in the investigation.

Feeling that he was losing momentum, Spell began demanding that Allain take a polygraph test. The candidate agreed to do so, but the two men disputed the arrangement of the examination. Shortly thereafter, Bramlett's campaign declared that if Allain passed three such tests the Republican would drop out of the race, while a group of businessmen demanded that both candidates take polygraph tests. Allain eventually took a polygraph test which supported his denials and his lawyer obtained an affidavit from one of the transvestite's parents, denouncing their son's credibility. By the close of the campaign, the contest had devolved into questions of the credibility of Allain and Spell, and Bramlett was largely forgotten by the public. In the general election on November 8, Allain won with 55 percent of the vote, while Bramlett only garnered 39 percent.

== Later life ==
Bramlett retired from farming in 2001. He served on U.S. Senator Thad Cochran's staff from 2001 to 2013. He died on October 19, 2015, at his son's home in Bedford, Texas.

== Works cited ==
- Bolton, Charles C. (2013). William F. Winter and the New Mississippi: A Biography. Jackson: University Press of Mississippi. ISBN 978-1-61703-787-0.
- Howard, John (2001). Men Like That: A Southern Queer History (reprint ed.). University of Chicago Press. ISBN 9780226354705.
- Nash, Jere; Taggart, Andy (2009). Mississippi Politics: The Struggle for Power, 1976-2008 (second ed.). University Press of Mississippi. ISBN 9781604733570.
- Wilkie, Curtis (2002). Dixie: A Personal Odyssey Through Historic Events That Shaped the Modern South. Simon and Schuster. ISBN 978-0-7432-2604-2.

Party political offices
Preceded by Gil Carmichael	Republican nominee for Governor of Mississippi; 1983	Succeeded by Jack Reed
