= Jessie Lee Garner =

African-American victim of assault

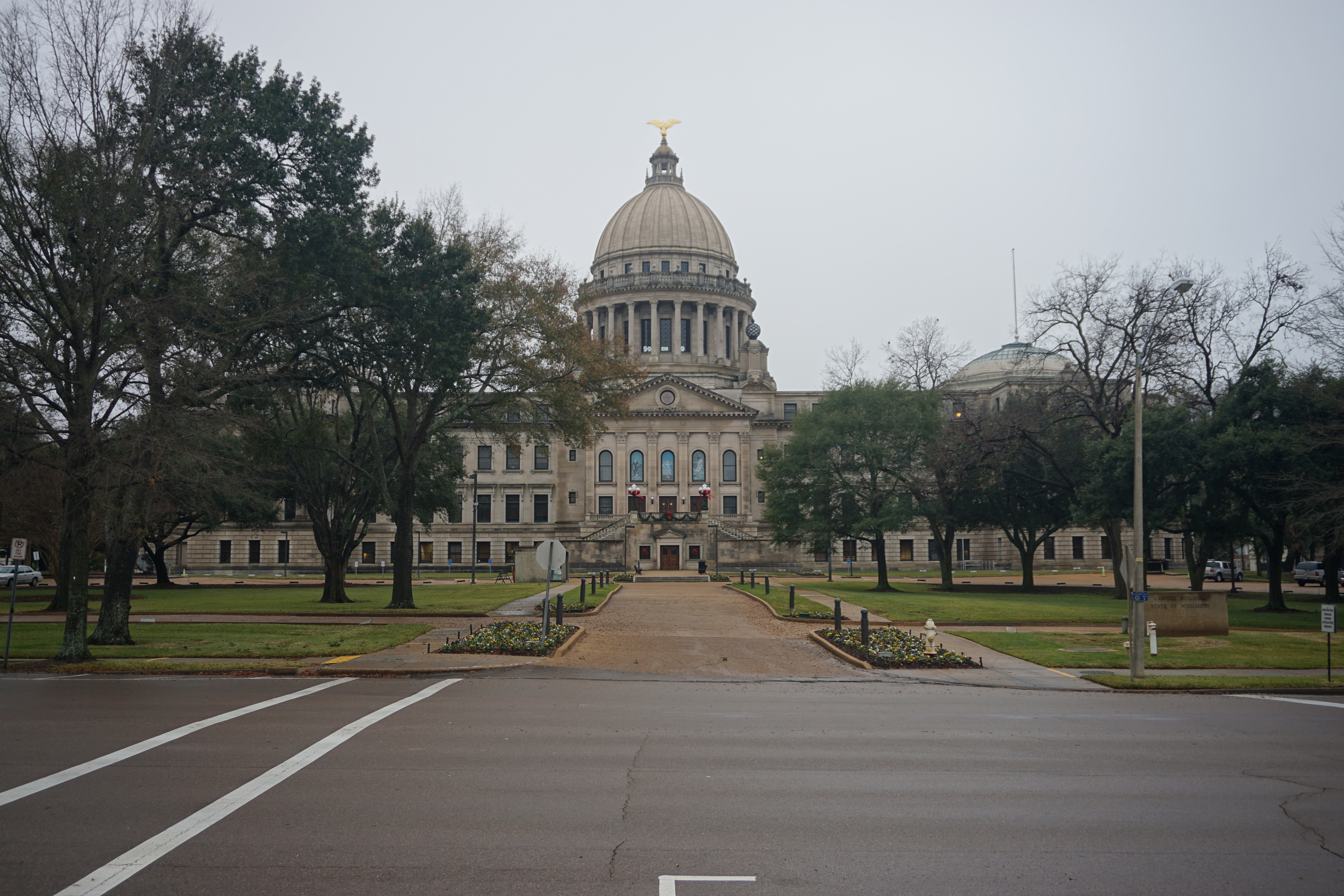
The Mississippi State Capitol, where the Supreme Court of Mississippi heard cases between 1903 and 1973

Jessie Lee Garner was an African American woman who, in the depths of Jim Crow segregation territory in Jackson, Mississippi, successfully sued the municipal bus company over being attacked by a white man who was seeking her seat in the African American section of the bus. An all-white jury awarded Garner damages of $1,000 (about $22,000 in 2024 dollars). This was a rare legal victory for a Black citizen of the American South in the white supremacist courts of the period, and is an example how attorneys for African Americans used state civil law to advance the civil rights of their clients before such juries.

== Violent attack ==
On August 31, 1936, Garner was six months pregnant and waiting for a bus outside Sutton's Ice Cream Parlor in Jackson. When the bus arrived, Garner took a seat in the section of the bus that was reserved for African Americans. As the bus followed its route, the other section of the bus became crowded, with all seats taken.

Outside the Edwards Hotel in downtown Jackson, a young white man walked back to the African American section of the bus and, "with rude and profane language", ordered Garner to stand up and to give her seat to him. Garner responded by noting her pregnancy and that she would be exiting the bus shortly at Farish Street. The man punched her twice in the head, knocking her to the bus floor, knocking out several pieces of dental work, and leaving her eyes badly swollen. She suffered a miscarriage soon thereafter and was bedridden from August 31 until mid-November.

== Court case ==
Garner sued the Mississippi Power & Light Company (today part of Entergy), claiming negligence. Mississippi's Jim Crow laws mandated that buses and trains have "by a partition or adjustable screen... so as to secure separate accommodations for the white and colored races". Mississippi statute required "a partition constructed of metal, wood, strong cloth, or other material".

Garner argued that if the bus had had a physical partition required by the law — as opposed to simply a small tin sign labeling the division of the two sections — the assault would not have occurred. One of Garner's three white attorneys wrote that the bus company knew that the lack of a partition "would very probably result in the injury to law-abiding, peaceable colored persons who were passengers on its buses, and that the proximate cause of the injury suffered by Garner was the failure of the power company to comply with the law, which directed them to separate the races".

Rather than attack the constitutionality of Jim Crow in front of an all-white jury — the strategy of her attorneys was instead, to accept it as a set of laws meant to preserve peace between the races and to appeal to "the paternalist sentiments of the jurors". The approach succeeded. The bus company lost the case and the jury awarded Garner $1,000, both for her medical expenses and because she had "suffered great pain and mental anguish".

Mississippi Power & Light appealed the verdict to the Supreme Court of Mississippi, arguing that the lack of a partition was not the proximate cause of the attack, but on October 18, 1937, the Supreme Court affirmed the lower court decision. In its decision, Justice George H. Ethridge wrote that the "object of the law in requiring separation of the races... is to avoid outbreaks and conflicts which mar the public peace".

== See also ==
- Apartheid
- Black Codes in the United States
- Jim Crow economy
- List of Jim Crow law examples by state
- Racial segregation in the United States
- Racism in the United States
- Second-class citizen
- Timeline of the civil rights movement
