= Joshua S. Morris =

Attorney General of Arkansas

Joshua S. Morris (1835 - February 13, 1890) was an American lawyer who served as the first Republican Attorney General of Mississippi from 1870 to 1874.

== Presidential campaign of 1872 ==
A letter Morris wrote regarding the 1872 presidential campaign, Letter from J.S. Morris, Esq., Attorney-general of Mississippi, on the Presidential Campaign of 1872, reveals the political divide, not just among the Reconstructionists and military occupation of the former Confederate States, but also within the Republican party during the campaign of Ulysses S. Grant. In this letter, Morris speaks for the continued protection of African Americans in the U.S. south, as well as against excessive taxation of white merchants and labourers. Letters to him from other officials are extant.

Referring to Grant, who was generally despised by whites in Mississippi, as the former Union Army General who defeated the Confederate forces, and due to the U.S. military continued to occupation of the state, Morris addressed Grant's presidential rival Horace Greeley's campaign, Anything to beat Grant. Morris writes:

"Suffice it to say that the motto, 'Anything to beat Grant,' does not meet my approbation. Let it rather be, “Anything to help Mississippi!” We are not in a condition to beat “anybody or anything.” Let us get into the prevailing sentiment of this great nation, make ourselves a part of it, secure its confidence and friendship, obtain a voice in its councils, and assist in guiding it. Then, and not till then, we may talk about “beating” somebody for President."

Grant took the state, winning by 27% of the vote.

== Other writings ==
He wrote an editorial about the role of militia officers and Mississippi governor Adelbert Ames in the "invasion of Vicksburg" (Vicksburg riots of 1874).

== Death ==
Morris died February 13, 1890, aged 55, at his home in Natchez and was survived by his wife and several children.
