= 1983 Tampa mayoral election =

- March 1, 1983
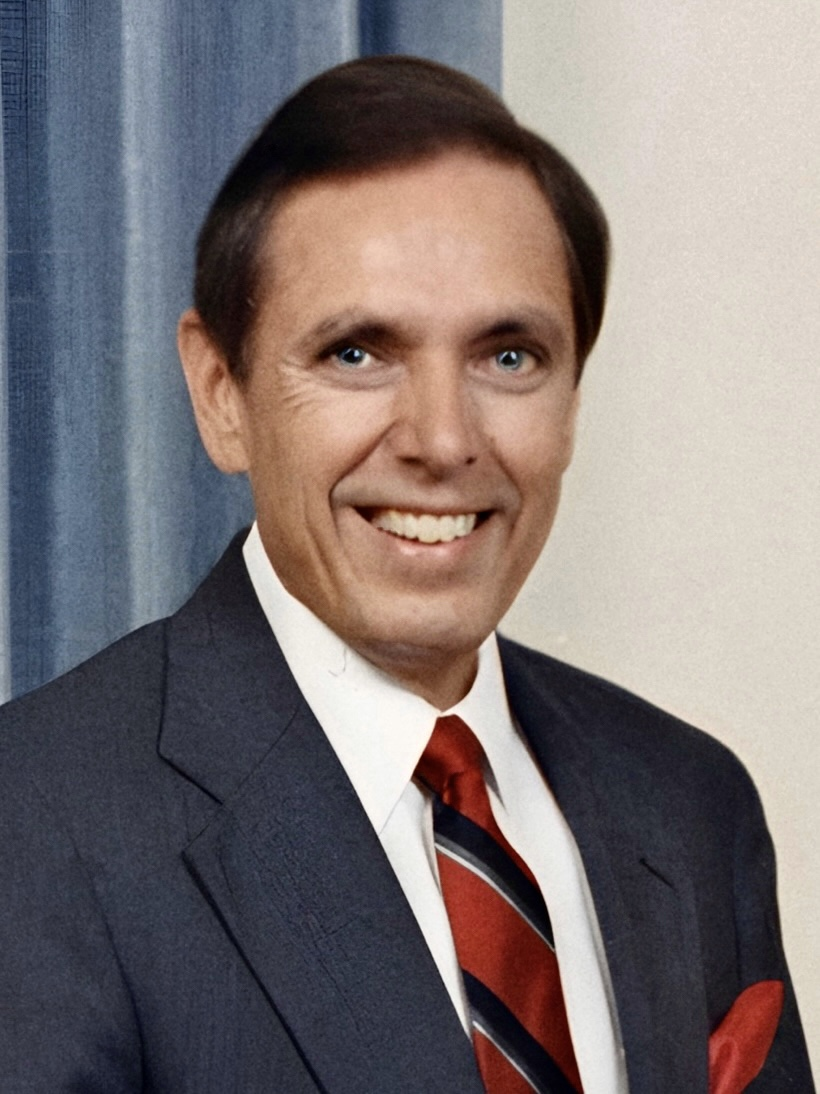

Candidate	Bob Martinez	Armando P. Valdes, Jr.
Party	Nonpartisan	Nonpartisan
Popular vote	27,984	7,141
Percentage	79.67%	20.33%
Mayor before election
Bob Martinez
Nonpartisan
Elected mayor
Bob Martinez
Nonpartisan

The 1983 Tampa mayoral election took place on March 1, 1983. Incumbent Mayor Bob Martinez ran for re-election to a second term. He was opposed by jeweler Armando Valdes, who had previously run for mayor several times. Martinez, who was personally popular and had significantly outraised Valdes, spent most of the campaign advocating and campaigning for a referendum to create district seats on the City Council. Martinez ultimately defeated Valdes in a landslide, winning 80 percent of the vote to Valdes's 20 percent.

Martinez did not serve a full term. He switched to the Republican Party to successfully run for governor in 1986, and resigned from office on July 16, 1986, to focus on his campaign. City Councilmember Sandra Freedman served out the remainder of Martinez's term.

== Candidates ==
- Bob Martinez, incumbent mayor
- Armando P. Valdes, Jr., jeweler, perennial candidate

== Results ==
1983 Tampa mayoral election
Party	Candidate	Votes	%
Nonpartisan	Bob Martinez (inc.)	27,984	79.67%
Nonpartisan	Armando P. Valdes, Jr.	7,141	20.33%
Total votes		35,125	100.00%
