= 1983 Louisiana lieutenant gubernatorial election =

- October 22, 1983 (first round); November 19, 1983 (runoff)

Candidate	Robert Louis Freeman Sr.	Jimmy Fitzmorris	William J. Long
Party	Democratic	Democratic	Democratic
First round	732,247; 47.52%	622,521; 40.40%	140,017; 9.09%
Runoff	625,306; 59.50%	425,536; 40.50%	Eliminated
- Parish results Freeman: 50–60% 60–70% 70–80% 80–90% Fitzmorris: 50–60% No Data
Lieutenant Governor before election
Robert Louis Freeman Sr.
Democratic
Elected Lieutenant Governor
Robert Louis Freeman Sr.
Democratic

The 1983 Louisiana lieutenant gubernatorial election was held on November 19, 1983, in order to elect the lieutenant governor of Louisiana. Incumbent Democratic lieutenant governor Robert Louis Freeman Sr. won re-election against fellow Democratic candidate and former lieutenant governor Jimmy Fitzmorris in the Runoff election.

== Background ==
Elections in Louisiana—with the exception of U.S. presidential elections—follow a variation of the open primary system called the jungle primary or the nonpartisan blanket primary. Candidates of any and all parties are listed on one ballot; voters need not limit themselves to the candidates of one party. Unless one candidate takes more than 50% of the vote in the first round, a run-off election is then held between the top two candidates, who may in fact be members of the same party. Texas uses this same format for its special elections. In this election, the first round of voting was held on October 22, 1983. The runoff was held on November 19, 1983.

== Primary election ==
On election day, October 22, 1983, incumbent Democratic lieutenant governor Robert Louis Freeman Sr. and former Democratic lieutenant governor Jimmy Fitzmorris received the most votes and thus advanced to a runoff election on November 19.

=== Results ===
Louisiana lieutenant gubernatorial primary election, 1983
Party	Candidate	Votes	%
Democratic	Robert Louis Freeman Sr. (incumbent)	732,247	47.52
Democratic	Jimmy Fitzmorris	622,521	40.40
Democratic	William J. Long	140,017	9.09
Republican	Larry Napoleon Cooper	46,056	2.99
Total votes		1,540,841	100.00

== Runoff election ==
On election day, November 19, 1983, incumbent Democratic lieutenant governor Robert Louis Freeman Sr. defeated fellow Democratic candidate and former lieutenant governor Jimmy Fitzmorris by a margin of 199,770 votes, thereby retaining Democratic control over the office of lieutenant governor. Freeman was sworn in for his second term on March 12, 1984.

=== Results ===
Louisiana lieutenant gubernatorial runoff election, 1983
Party	Candidate	Votes	%
Democratic	Robert Louis Freeman Sr. (incumbent)	625,306	59.50
Democratic	Jimmy Fitzmorris	425,536	40.50
Total votes		1,050,842	100.00
Democratic hold			
