= Mississippi Attorney General =

Attorney general for the U.S. state of Mississippi

Attorney General of Mississippi
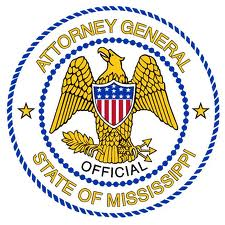
- Seal of the attorney general

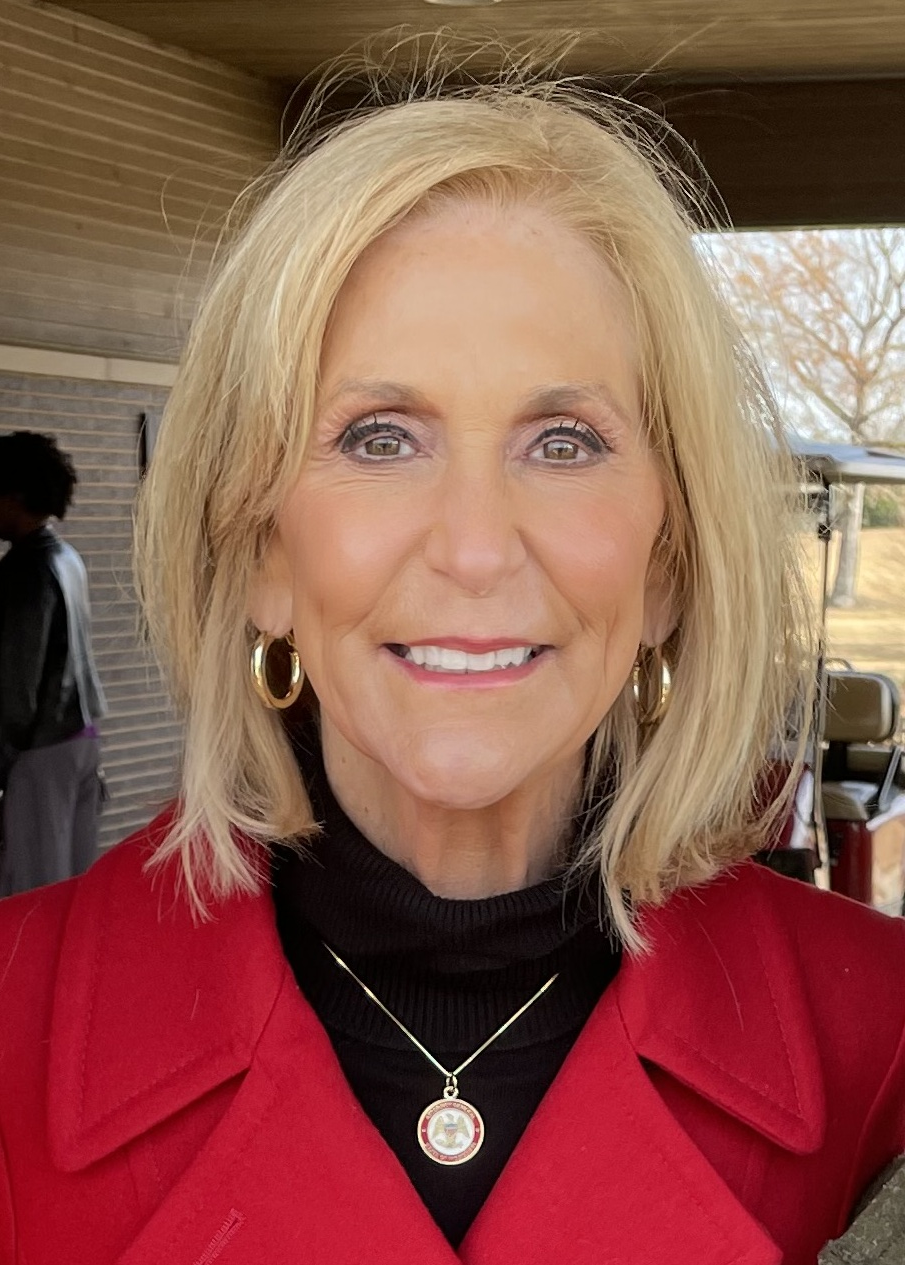
- Incumbent; Lynn Fitch since January 9, 2020
- Term length: 4 years
- Formation: 1818
- First holder: Lyman Harding
- Salary: $150,000 annually
- Website: ago.state.ms.us

The attorney general of Mississippi is a statewide elected office in the U.S. state of Mississippi. The attorney general is a constitutional officer responsible for representing state agencies in legal matters, supplying other state officials and prosecutors with legal advice, and bringing lawsuits on behalf of the state. They serve a four-year term with no term limits.

The office was created by 1817 Constitution of Mississippi as a legislatively-elected position with a one-year term. In 1832 the office was made popularly-elective and the term was extended. All attorneys general from 1878 to 2020 were Democrats. The incumbent attorney general, Republican Lynn Fitch, was sworn-in to office on January 9, 2020.

== History ==
The 1817 Constitution of Mississippi provided for an attorney general to be elected by the Mississippi State Legislature for a one-year term. The legislature elected Mississippi's first attorney general, Lyman Harding, on January 21, 1818. Under the constitution of 1832, the term was extended to four years and the officer was made popularly-elective.

The 1890 state constitution maintained the attorney general of Mississippi as a popularly-elected executive official with a four-year term. The document also made the officer an ex officio member of the State Board of Education. In 1982 the constitution was amended, removing the attorney general from the board effective July 1, 1984. From 1878 until 2020, all Mississippi attorneys general were Democrats. The incumbent attorney general, Republican Lynn Fitch, was sworn-in to office on January 9, 2020. She is the first woman to hold the position.

== Powers and responsibilities ==
Like the seats in the Mississippi State Legislature and the other seven statewide-elected offices, the Mississippi attorney general is popularly elected every four years in the November preceding a United States presidential election year. There are no term limits for the holder of the office. Candidates for the office must meet the same constitutional qualifications as candidates for circuit court and chancery court judges; they must be at least 26 years old, have lived in the state for at least five years, and have practiced law for at least five years. The attorney general's salary is determined by law. It is currently fixed at $108,960 per year, but is set to increase to $150,000 annually in 2024.

The attorney general is the chief legal officer of the state and serves as the state's lawyer, representing its agencies, boards, and commissions in legal capacities. The attorney general's office also represents district attorneys and local judges in civil litigation, though it is forbidden by law from providing counsel to defendants in criminal cases. Only their office can bring or defend a lawsuit on behalf of the state, though they may retain private counsel to work on their own behalf in such instances. They are also empowered to appoint special investigations and prosecutors to try criminal cases on behalf of the state, and may—at their own discretion—assume responsibility for the prosecution of a crime in the event a local district attorney recuses themselves from proceedings. The attorney general is responsible for appointing the state's solicitor general. (Note: State law does not explicitly authorize or recognize the position of solicitor general, but Attorney General Lynn Fitch created the job shortly after assuming office in 2020 to lead appellate activities.) They are empowered by law to issue advisory opinions on questions of state law to statewide elected officials, legislators, state agencies, judges, and some local officials. They can also exercise powers under common law.

The Office of the Attorney General of Mississippi is split into 16 divisions. The main facilities of the attorney general and their staff are located in Jackson, though a satellite office is maintained in Biloxi and another is planned to be opened in Oxford. As of February 2023, the agency employs about 300 people, including attorneys and law enforcement officers.

== List of attorneys general ==
Attorneys General
No.	Attorney General	Term in office	Party	Source
1	Lyman Harding	1818 – 1820	Democrat-Republican	
2	Edward Turner	1820 – 1821	Democrat-Republican	
3	Thomas Buck Reed	1821 – 1825	Democrat-Republican	
4	Richard Stockton	1825 – 1828	Jacksonian Democrat	
5	George Adams	1828 – 1829	Jacksonian Democrat	
6	Robert H. Buckner	1829 – 1830	Democratic	
7	R. M. Gaines	1830 – 1834	Democratic	
8	M. D. Patton	1834 – 1837	Democratic	
9	T. F. Collins	1837 – 1841	Democratic	
10	John D. Freeman	1841 – 1850	Democratic	
11	David C. Glenn	1850 – 1857	Democratic	
12	T. J. Wharton	1857 – 1865	Democratic	
13	Charles E. Hooker	1865 – 1868	Democratic	
14	Jasper Myers	1868 – 1870	Democratic	
15	Joshua S. Morris	1870 – 1874	Republican	
16	George E. Harris	1874 – 1878	Republican	
17	Thomas C. Catchings	1878 – 1885	Democratic	
18	Thomas S. Ford	1885 – 1886	Democratic	
19	T. Marshall Miller	1886 – 1893	Democratic	
20	Frank Johnston	1893 – 1896	Democratic	
21	Wiley N. Nash	1896 – 1900	Democratic	
22	Monroe McClurg	1900 – 1903	Democratic	
23	William Williams	1903 – 1907	Democratic	
25	Robert Virgil Fletcher	1907 – 1908	Democratic	
26	J. Bowman Sterling	1908 – 1910	Democratic	
27	Shepherd Spencer Hudson	1910 – 1912	Democratic	
28	Ross A. Collins	1912 – 1920	Democratic	
29	Frank Roberson	1920 – 1923	Democratic	
30	Clayton D. Potter	1923 – 1924	Democratic	
31	Rush Hightower Knox	1924 – 1928	Democratic	
32	George T. Mitchell	1928 – 1932	Democratic	
33	Greek Lent Rice	1932 – 1950	Democratic	
34	James P. Coleman	1950 – 1956	Democratic	
35	Joseph Turner Patterson	1956 – 1969	Democratic	
36	A. F. Summer	1969 – 1980	Democratic	
37	William Allain	1980 – 1984	Democratic	
38	Edwin L. Pittman	1984 – 1988	Democratic	
39	Mike Moore	1988 – 2004	Democratic	
40	Jim Hood	2004 – 2020	Democratic	
41	Lynn Fitch	2020 – present	Republican	

== Works cited ==
- Bullock, Charles S.; Rozell, Mark J., eds. (2010). The New Politics of the Old South: An Introduction to Southern Politics. Rowman & Littlefield. ISBN 9780742570214.
- Krane, Dale; Shaffer, Stephen D. (1992). Mississippi Government and Politics: Modernizers Versus Traditionalists. University of Nebraska Press. ISBN 9780803277588.
- Mississippi Official and Statistical Register 2020–2024. Jackson: Mississippi Secretary of State. 2021. OCLC 1353823876.
- Rowland, Dunbar, ed. (1904). The Official and Statistical Register of the State of Mississippi. Jackson: Mississippi Department of Archives and History. OCLC 777030828.
- Welcome Guide (PDF), Mississippi Attorney General's Office, February 2023
- Winkle, John W. III (2014). The Mississippi State Constitution (second ed.). Oxford University Press. ISBN 9780199300631.
