= Cumberland College =

Cumberland College may refer to:

- Cumberland College of Health Sciences, Sydney, now University of Sydney School of Health Sciences
- Cumberland College, Otago, a residential college for the University of Otago, in Dunedin, New Zealand
- Cumberland College (Princeton, Kentucky), a defunct institution
- Cumberland College (Saskatchewan)
- Cumberland County College in Vineland, New Jersey
- Cumberland School of Law in Birmingham, Alabama; formerly in Tennessee
- Cumberland University in Lebanon, Tennessee; formerly named Cumberland College
- University of Nashville, formerly named Cumberland College
- University of the Cumberlands in Williamsburg, Kentucky; formerly named Cumberland College
- University of the Ozarks, formerly named Arkansas Cumberland College
