= Farish Street Neighborhood Historic District =

Historic district in Mississippi, United States

- U.S. National Register of Historic Places
- U.S. Historic district
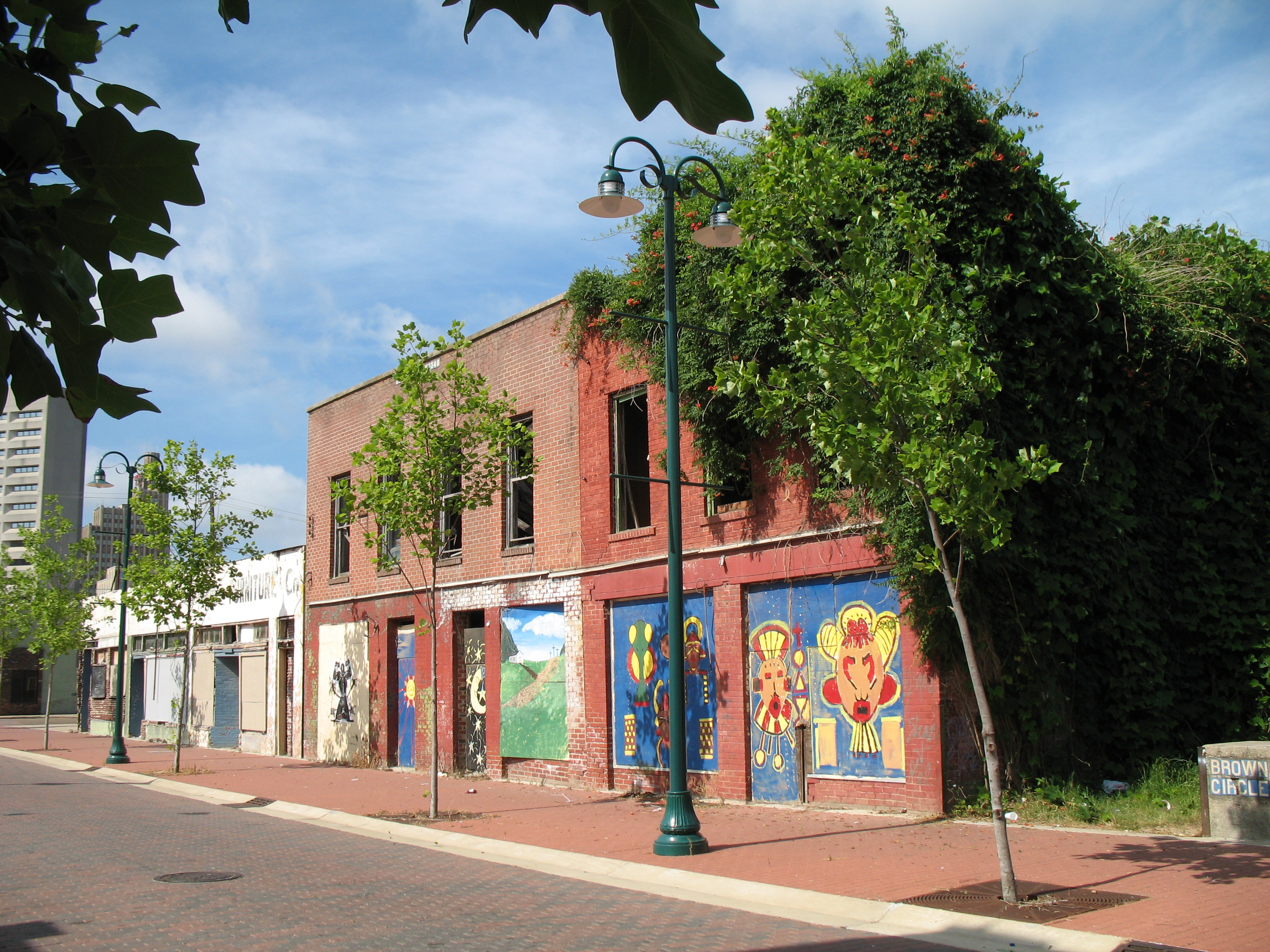

- Location within Mississippi
- Location: Roughly bounded by Amite, Mill, Fortification and Lamar Sts., Jackson, Mississippi
- Coordinates: 32°18′14″N 90°11′19″W
- Area: 125 acres (51 ha)
- Architectural style: Bungalow/craftsman, Art Deco, Queen Anne
- NRHP reference No.: 80002245
- Added to NRHP: March 13, 1980

Farish Street Neighborhood Historic District is a historic district and neighborhood in Jackson, Mississippi, known as a hub for Black-owned businesses up until the 1970s. Named after a family that lived and had businesses on that street for four generations, the street became a flourishing business area after the imposition of legal segregation under Jim Crow.

== History ==
By 1908 one third of the area of Jackson was black-owned, one third of the houses where blacks lived were black-owned, and half of black families owned their own homes. Sidney Dillon Redmond (1871–1948) reportedly owned some 300 rental homes in the Farish Street Neighborhood Historic District in Jackson. In 1915 the Farish Street neighborhood was well known as a progressive area in Jackson; and Farish Street was home to Trumpet Records, Ace Records, and Speir Phonograph Company. Jackson State University, a historically Black university, was located at the corner of Farish and Griffith for about a year until it moved to its new location. Jessie Lee Garner was a resident of the neighborhood.

The Farish Street neighborhood was added as a historic district to the National Register of Historic Places in 1980. The neighborhood is historically significant as an economically independent black community, and as of 1980 was the largest such community in Mississippi. Most of the properties in the district were built between 1890 and 1930.

A plan to renovate shotgun style homes for low income housing was initiated during the 1990s.
