= William Allain =

American politician (1928–2013)

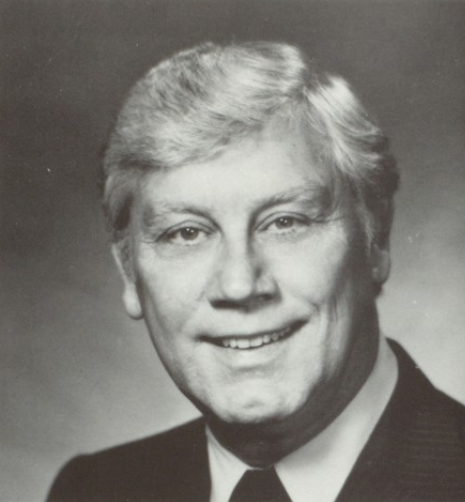

59th Governor of Mississippi
- In office January 10, 1984 – January 12, 1988
- Lieutenant: Brad Dye
- Preceded by: William F. Winter
- Succeeded by: Ray Mabus

36th Attorney General of Mississippi
- In office January 22, 1980 – January 10, 1984
- Governor: William Winter
- Preceded by: A. F. Summer
- Succeeded by: Edwin L. Pittman

Personal details
- Born: February 14, 1928 Washington, Mississippi, U.S.
- Died: December 2, 2013 (aged 85) Jackson, Mississippi, U.S.
- Resting place: Natchez City Cemetery; Natchez, Mississippi, U.S.
- Party: Democratic
- Spouse: Doris Rush (m. 1964; div. 1970)
- Education: University of Notre Dame (BA); University of Mississippi (LLB)

Military service
- Allegiance: United States
- Branch/service: United States Army
- Years of service: 1950-1953
- Battles/wars: Korean War

William A. Allain (February 14, 1928 – December 2, 2013) was an American politician and lawyer who held office as the 59th governor of Mississippi as a Democrat from 1984 to 1988. Born in Adams County, Mississippi, he attended the University of Notre Dame and received a law degree from the University of Mississippi School of Law in 1948.

He served in the U.S. Army during the Korean War and practiced law in Natchez until he was appointed Assistant Attorney General of Mississippi in 1962. In 1979 he was elected Attorney General of Mississippi. In that capacity he fought utility rate increases and sued to have members of the Mississippi State Legislature removed from executive boards in state government.

Allain ran for gubernatorial office in 1983. During the general election allegations emerged that Allain had engaged in sexual activity with transvestites. The veracity of the allegations were disputed and Allain won the election, but his credibility with the public was damaged and made it difficult for him to secure public support for his ideas as governor.

Taking office in January 1984, he blocked tax increases and unsuccessfully pushed for a constitutional convention. Leaving office in January 1988, he opened a law practice in Jackson. He died there after becoming stricken with pneumonia in 2013.

== Early life ==
William Allain was born in Washington in Adams County, Mississippi, United States on February 14, 1928. He was educated in county public schools and graduated from Natchez High School. He studied pre-law at University of Notre Dame and enrolled at the University of Mississippi School of Law in 1948, graduating with a law degree in May 1950.

Allain opened a law office in Natchez later that year, though upon the outbreak of the Korean War he enlisted in the United States Army infantry. Honorably discharged in 1953, he returned to legal practice. He was a member of the American Legion and Veterans of Foreign Wars. He married Dorus Johnson in 1964 and divorced her in 1970. He continued to practice law until he was appointed Assistant Attorney General of Mississippi in 1962. In that capacity he represented the state government in state courts, federal district and appellate courts, and the United States Supreme Court. He helped to represent the state to the federal government during the integration of the University of Mississippi and in the Conner v. Johnson reapportionment cases. Leaving the post in 1975, he practiced law in Jackson until 1979.

== Political career ==
=== Attorney General ===
In 1979 Allain sought election to the office of Attorney General of Mississippi. A Democrat, he faced Republican Charles W. Pickering in the general election. Opinion polls showed Pickering with a lead throughout most of the campaign. Two days before the election date, Pickering's campaign organization ran a series of radio ads in black-majority communities which accused Allain of opposing civil rights for blacks throughout his career and being a former member of a Citizens' Council. (Note: The allegation that Allain was once a member of a Citizens' Council was untrue.) Allain's campaign publicized the ads further and denounced them as "gutter tactics", with the hopes of assuaging blacks' possible concerns while also garnering support from conservative whites. The following day both candidates scheduled press conferences in each major city in the state with a television media market. Allain's campaign scheduled him just before Pickering's appearances. In Jackson, Allain was slated to appear at the same hotel room as his opponent. His campaign team arranged for the room to be professionally lit, and Allain denounced Pickering for having "lied to the people of the state of Mississippi. He says one thing to the black community and another to the whites." Allain's team then removed their lights, leaving Pickering to deliver his press conference in a comparatively dim setting while overwhelmed with questions about his ads from reporters. Allain was elected state attorney general on November 6, with Pickering attributing his defeat to the fallout from his ads.

Allain earned a reputation as a consumer advocate. He fought utility rate increases and stopped the storage of nuclear waste in Mississippi. State labor president Claude Ramsay sought to broker an agreement between Democratic Party presidential candidate Walter F. Mondale and Allain when the latter sought a veto over the federal storage of nuclear waste in Mississippi as a condition for his political support of Mondale.

In December 1981 Allain advised 36 members of the Mississippi State Legislature that they should be removed from executive boards in state government, arguing that their participation on these bodies violated the separation of powers language in the Mississippi Constitution. After the legislature ignored the issue during its 1982 session, he warned them that he would pursue legal action against them. When final negotiations between the two parties failed, the legislators sued Allain on April 7, 1982 to secure a legal judgement in their favor. He filed his own lawsuit several hours later. The case was initially heard in the Hinds County Circuit Court in November, and the following February the circuit court judge ruled in Allain's favor. The legislators concerned appealed the case to the Supreme Court of Mississippi, which unanimously affirmed the previous decision in Alexander v. State of Mississippi by and Through Allain and ordered the legislators to vacate their executive positions.

=== 1983 gubernatorial campaign ===
In 1983 Allain ran for the office of governor, facing five other candidates in the Democratic primary, including businessman Mike Sturdivant and former lieutenant governor Evelyn Gandy. While Gandy was the most well-known of the three, Allain benefitted from press coverage throughout the year for his efforts to have convicted murderer Jimmy Lee Gray executed. He placed second in the Democratic primary and defeated Gandy in the primary runoff and faced Republican candidate Leon Bramlett in the general election. Allain ran a populist-style campaign, emphasizing his work as attorney to general to prevent utility rate increases. Early polls indicated that he had a large lead over Bramlett.

During the campaign Bramlett attacked Allain for being a "bachelor" and emphasized that he was "blessed" with a wife and children and thus more qualified to manage education and healthcare issues. Allain accused Bramlett making "smears and innuendo" and of rumor–mongering, and emphasized that he had once had three step-children through his previous marriage. Meanwhile, three Republican oil company executives, having heard rumors that Allain regularly solicited sex from black transvestites, decided to enlist attorney Bill Spell and a private detective agency to investigate the veracity of the claims. They obtained a copy of Allain's divorce decree, which reportedly included grievances from his former wife that he would "absent himself at night over long periods of time and failed to perform his husbandly duties." The attorney and detectives interviewed three black transvestites who testified that they had sex with Allain and repairmen from his former apartment complex who said they had seen gay pornography in his unit. The oil executives informed Bramlett of their findings, but he refused to support their efforts. State Democratic leaders were tipped off about the investigation and decided that they would rebuff any allegations and support Allain.

After failed attempts to get the media to report the story, Spell held a press conference on October 25 to publicly reveal the allegations, noting that the claims were supported by the three transvestites—who had undergone polygraph examinations—and by police officers who had reported witnessing Allain attempt to solicit transvestite prostitutes in the Farish Street District of Jackson. The allegations were printed on the front page of The Clarion-Ledger the following morning. Allain denounced the allegations as "malicious lies", denied knowing the three transvestites, and said, "I'm no sexual deviate and Leon Bramlett knows it." He also said he would sue his accusers for defamation. The oil executives and their detectives moved the transvestites around various motels to control their appearances. Bramlett distanced himself from them and maintained that he had no involvement in the investigation. Other Democratic statewide candidates rallied to Allain's defense, while most media outlets rebuffed attempts by Spell to purchase advertisements to further publicize his findings.

Feeling that he was losing momentum, Spell began demanding that Allain take a polygraph test. The candidate agreed to do so, but the two men disputed the arrangement of the examination. Shortly thereafter, Bramlett's campaign declared that if Allain passed three such tests the Republican would drop out of the race, while a group of businessmen demanded that both candidates take polygraph tests. Allain eventually took a polygraph test which supported his denials and his lawyer obtained an affidavit from one of the transvestite's parents, denouncing their son's credibility. By the close of the campaign, the contest had devolved into questions of the credibility of Allain and Spell, and Bramlett was largely forgotten by the public. In the general election on November 8, Allain won with 55 percent of the vote, while Bramlett only garnered 39 percent. In January 1984 the transvestites reneged their stories, saying they had been paid for their testimonies, and Allain's attorney said new polygraph test results showed they had lied in October. Considering the affair over, Allain never followed up on his threat of a lawsuit. Nevertheless, the allegations damaged Allain's credibility with the public and made it difficult for him to secure public support for his ideas as governor.

=== Governor ===
Allain was sworn-in as Governor of Mississippi on January 10, 1984, becoming the first Roman Catholic to hold the office. He created an administrative task force of state agency heads to reduce the use of illegal drugs, leading to the interdiction and seizure of almost a ton of cocaine. He backed Steve Patterson's successful bid to become chairman of the Mississippi Democratic Party in May 1984.

In 1984 the legislature passed a reorganization act which removed its members from executive boards—pursuant to the ruling in Alexander v. Allain—and created two new advisory budget commissions, one which consisted largely of legislators and another which was controlled by the governor. Allain took a passive approach towards crafting his first budget proposal, figuring—correctly—that the legislature would largely ignore it. Strongly opposed to tax increases, in 1985 he vetoed a hike which would back the raising of the salaries of public school teachers. This generated the first teacher strike in the state's history, and eventually the legislature overrode his veto. His staunch refusal to support tax hikes contributed to the cutting of funding for many state services during his tenure.

After securing the removal of legislators from executive boards, Allain focused on reforming the State Highway Department, which was led by a three-member elected commission. He instead lobbied for the leadership of the department to be placed in a director to be appointed by the governor. Failing to secure this change, he vetoed the highway funding bill in 1986. Irritated by the department's lack of responsiveness regarding questions over how much of its appropriated funds were not yet committed to projects, he issued an executive order to seize control of the department and its books so that leftover money could be moved into the state's general fund. The attorney general ruled against the takeover of the department but permitted Allain to have its books audited. The audit revealed that the department had $23 million in uncommitted funds, and over the following two years the legislature re-appropriated most of the money to other areas.

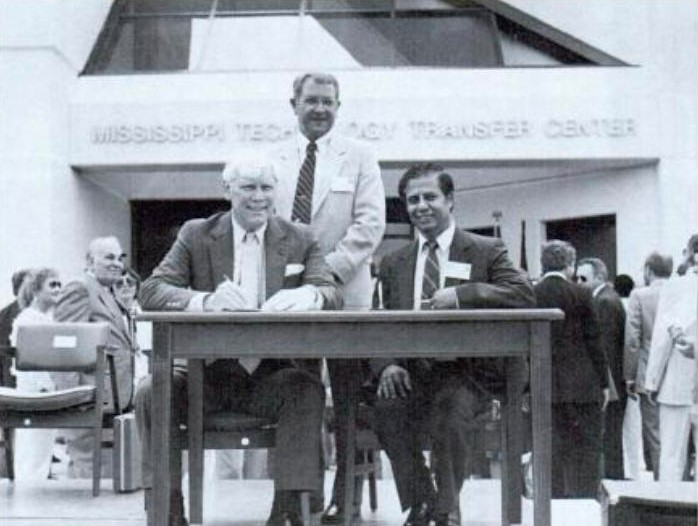
Allain (seated left) signing over the Mississippi Technology Transfer Center to the federal government in 1987

In the aftermath of the 1986 legislative session, highway officials and several businessmen lobbied Allain to call the legislature into special session to fund the highways before the end of the fiscal year. He scheduled a special session for May 28, but backed away from his reform plan when it garnered little public traction. Highway funding was secured, while towards the end of the session the lobby group and the highway commissioners drafted a plan to greatly expand the number of the state's four-lane highways, dubbed Advocating Highways for Economic Advancement and Development (AHEAD), financed by a five-cent increase on fuel-per-gallon taxes. Legislators introduced the bill at the open of their 1987 session, but Allain proposed his own program the following day, which included four-lane highway construction, a reorganization of the highway department, and scrapped the tax hike in favor of a bond issue. AHEAD supporters ignored Allain's proposal, and were able to pass their program. Allain vetoed the bill, saying "I am not willing to be a party to any program which means an undue tax increase, coupled with a continuance of present practices." The legislature subsequently overrode the governor's veto.

In 1985 Allain appointed Reuben V. Anderson to the Mississippi Supreme Court, the first black man to ever sit on it. He also appointed a 350-person Constitutional Study Commission, chaired by former governor James P. Coleman. It outlined a new state constitution which greatly strengthened the executive authority of the governor, and appealed to the legislature to schedule a constitutional convention. The legislature scheduled two amendments for referendum in 1986, but though Allain publicly endorsed a full convention in early 1987, the legislature never permitted one to be held.

As the result of the referendum to amend the constitution in 1986, the Governor of Mississippi was permitted to seek election to a consecutive term. Allain did not indicate whether he intended to seek re-election, but let the June 5, 1987 filing deadline for candidates pass without taking any action. He later explained, "I got a little tired [...] With age and everything else, I just decided I didn't want to go campaign." He left office in January 1988.

== Later life ==
After leaving the governorship, Allain opened a law practice in Jackson. He generally kept to himself in later years, and in 2009 lost much of his eyesight to glaucoma. In late November 2013 he was hospitalized for pneumonia. He died in Jackson on December 2 and was buried in Natchez City Cemetery. Unlike most Mississippi governors, Allain did not have an official portrait painted of himself during his tenure, and one was not unveiled until 2018.

== Works cited ==
- Danielson, Chris (2011). After Freedom Summer : How Race Realigned Mississippi Politics, 1965–1986. Gainesville: University of Florida Press. ISBN 9780813037387.
- Howard, John (2001). Men Like That: A Southern Queer History (reprint ed.). University of Chicago Press. ISBN 9780226354705.
- Krane, Dale; Shaffer, Stephen D. (1992). Mississippi Government and Politics: Modernizers Versus Traditionalists. University of Nebraska Press. ISBN 9780803277588.
- Mississippi Official and Statistical Register 1980–1984. Jackson: Mississippi Secretary of State. 1981.
- Nash, Jere; Taggart, Andy (2009). Mississippi Politics: The Struggle for Power, 1976-2008 (second ed.). University Press of Mississippi. ISBN 9781604733570.
- Pugh, Brian (2019). "The Mississippi Legislature's Dominance over Budgeting Pre-Reform" (PDF). The Journal of Mississippi History. LXXXI (3, 4). Mississippi Historical Society: 163–184. ISSN 0022-2771.
- Sansing, David G. (2016). Mississippi Governors: Soldiers, Statesmen, Scholars, Scoundrels (first ed.). Oxford: Nautilus Publishing Company. ISBN 978-1-936946-81-5.

Legal offices
Preceded by A. F. Summer	Attorney General of Mississippi; January 22, 1980–January 10, 1984	Succeeded by Edwin L. Pittman
Party political offices
Preceded by William Winter	Democratic nominee for Governor of Mississippi; 1983	Succeeded by Ray Mabus
Political offices
Preceded by William Winter	Governor of Mississippi; January 10, 1984–January 12, 1988	Succeeded by Ray Mabus
