= 1983 Mississippi gubernatorial election =

- November 8, 1983
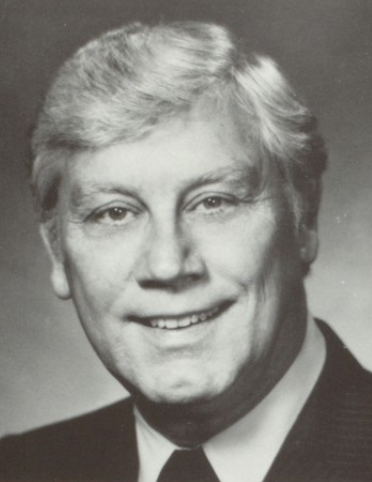

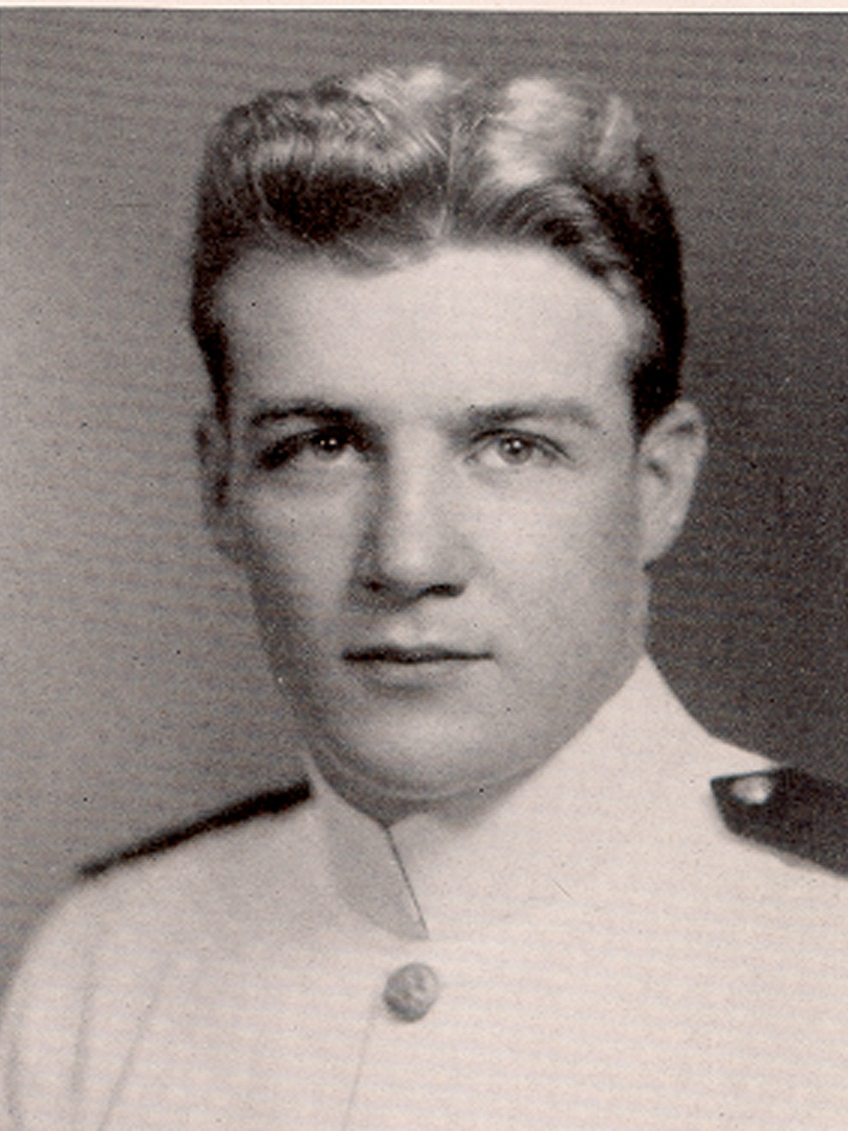
Nominee	William Allain	Leon Bramlett
Party	Democratic	Republican
Popular vote	409,209	288,764
Percentage	55.10%	38.88%
- County results Allain: 50–60% 60–70% 70–80% 80–90% Bramlett: 50–60%
Governor before election
William Winter
Democratic
Elected Governor
William Allain
Democratic

The 1983 Mississippi gubernatorial election took place on November 8, 1983, in order to elect the Governor of Mississippi. Incumbent Democrat William Winter was term-limited, and could not run for reelection to a second term. As of 2023, this is the last time that Hinds County has voted for the Republican candidate.

As of 2026, this is the most recent Mississippi gubernatorial election to feature major party nominees who are now both deceased.

== Democratic primary ==
No candidate received a majority in the Democratic primary, so a runoff was held between the top two candidates. The runoff election was won by Attorney General William Allain, who defeated former Lieutenant Governor Evelyn Gandy.

=== Results ===
Mississippi Democratic gubernatorial primary, 1983
Party	Candidate	Votes	%
Democratic	Evelyn Gandy	316,304	38.19
Democratic	William Allain	293,348	35.42
Democratic	Mike Sturdivant	172,526	20.83
Democratic	Lonnie C. Johnson	32,861	3.97
Democratic	Billy Davis	13,172	1.59
Total votes		828,211	100.00

=== Runoff ===
Mississippi Democratic gubernatorial primary runoff, 1983
Party	Candidate	Votes	%
Democratic	William Allain	405,348	52.42
Democratic	Evelyn Gandy	367,953	47.58
Total votes		773,301	100.00

== General election ==
=== Campaign ===
In the campaign, the private detective Rex Armistead, formerly with the Mississippi State Sovereignty Commission, helped to spread rumors that Allain had sexual intercourse with two African-American male transvestites. Allain denied the charges. The transvestites went on the record with a lie detector but in 1984, after the election had been held, they claimed that they had never met Allain and had been paid for their testimony. Bramlett lost the general election, 288,764 (38.9 percent) to Allain's 409,209 (55.1 percent). Charles Evers, the African American civil rights activist from Fayette, ran as an Independent and polled 30,593 (4.1 percent). Gil Carmichael, who defeated Bramlett for the GOP gubernatorial nomination in a very close race in 1979, ran in 1983 for lieutenant governor as a low-budget independent candidate in an apparent attempt to gain a larger share of the African-American vote against the incumbent Democrat Brad Dye, who prevailed with 464,080 votes (64.3 percent) to Carmichael's 257,623 (35.7 percent). Bramlett, spending over $1.1 million total (and outspending Allain as well) outpolled Carmichael by just over 31,000 votes when both were on the ballot as de facto ticket mates.

=== Results ===
Mississippi gubernatorial election, 1983
Party	Candidate	Votes	%
Democratic	William Allain	409,209	55.10
Republican	Leon Bramlett	288,764	38.88
Independent	Charles Evers	30,493	4.12
Independent	Billie H. Taylor	7,869	1.06
Independent	Henry McMullen Williams	6,302	0.85
Total votes		742,737	100.00
Democratic hold			

== Analysis ==
Historian David Sansing described the 1983 contest as "one of the most tumultuous campaigns in the history of Mississippi politics." Journalist Charles Overby wrote that the sex scandal accusations were "a lot stranger than fiction". The allegations and the 1983 campaign have been covered in several works, including William Franklin West's 1995 master's thesis, The Case of the Reluctant Story: The Allain Sex Scandal; a chapter in Jere Nash and Andy Taggart's Mississippi Politics; and several pages in John Howard's 199 book on gay history in Mississippi, Men Like That. Through the passage by Mississippi voters of a 1986 amendment to the state constitution, Allain became the first Governor in a century eligible to run for reelection in 1987, but up to the filing deadline for candidates that year declined to say whether or not he would, and the deadline passed without him filing to.

== Works cited ==
- Sansing, David G. (2016). Mississippi Governors: Soldiers, Statesmen, Scholars, Scoundrels (first ed.). Oxford: Nautilus Publishing Company. ISBN 978-1-936946-81-5.
