= 1971 United States gubernatorial elections =

- November 2, 1971; February 1, 1972 (LA)

3 governorships
	Majority party	Minority party
Party	Democratic	Republican
Seats before	29	21
Seats after	30	20
Seat change	▲1	▼1
Seats up	2	1
Seats won	3	0
- Democratic hold Democratic gain

United States gubernatorial elections were held in three states. In Mississippi and Kentucky, general elections took place on 2 November 1971. In Louisiana, their general election took place on 1 February 1972 after the party primaries on 6 November 1971 and a Democratic primary runoff on 18 December 1971. In Mississippi and Louisiana, Democrats held both open seats. In Kentucky, Democrats flipped the open seat from Republicans.

In Kentucky, Louie B. Nunn was not allowed to run for a second term under the term limits rule at the time, a rule that was changed in 1992. In Mississippi, John Bell Williams was also barred from a second term under the term limits rule at the time, a rule that was changed in the mid-1980s. In Louisiana, John McKeithen had been allowed a second term due to a new rule enacted that allowed governors two consecutive terms, and thus was allowed to run for a second term (see Louisiana gubernatorial election, 1967). Thus, he too was term-limited.

== Election results ==
State	Incumbent	Party	First elected	Result	Candidates
Kentucky	Louie Nunn	Republican	1967	Incumbent term-limited. New governor elected. Democratic gain.	✓ Wendell Ford (Democratic) 50.56%; Tom Emberton (Republican) 44.35%; Happy Chandler (Independent) 4.24%; William Smith (American) 0.85%
Louisiana	John McKeithen	Democratic	1964	Incumbent term-limited. New governor elected. Democratic hold.	✓ Edwin Edwards (Democratic) 57.2%; Dave Treen (Republican) 42.8%
Mississippi	John Bell Williams	Democratic	1967	Incumbent term-limited. New governor elected. Democratic hold.	✓ Bill Waller (Democratic) 77.02%; Charles Evers (Independent) 22.13%; Charles L. Sullivan (Independent) 0.85%

== Closest races ==
States where the margin of victory was under 10%:

1. Kentucky, 6.21%

== Kentucky ==
1971 Kentucky gubernatorial election
- November 2, 1971
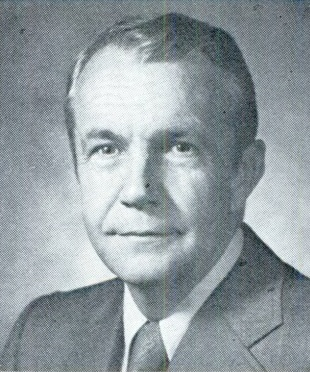

Nominee	Wendell Ford	Thomas Emberton
Party	Democratic	Republican
Popular vote	470,420	412,653
Percentage	50.56%	44.35%
- Ford: 30–40% 40–50% 50–60% 60–70% 70–80% Emberton: 40–50% 50–60% 60–70% 70–80%
Governor before election
Louie Nunn
Republican
Elected Governor
Wendell Ford
Democratic

The 1971 Kentucky gubernatorial election was held on November 2, 1971. Incumbent Republican Louie Nunn, was ineligible for a second term due to term limits, a rule that was later repealed in 1992.

In the Democratic primary, Lieutenant Governor Wendell Ford ran against former Governor Bert Combs and 6 other opponents. Ford would win in an easy victory that wasn't expected. In the Republican primary, Thomas Emberton easily won his primary and was endorsed by Governor Nunn.

In the general election, Ford and Emberton were joined by former Governor A. B. "Happy" Chandler, running as an Independent, as well as American Party candidate William Smith. The Republicans had hoped that Chandler would help Emberton's chances, but Ford ultimately won the general election.

== Louisiana ==
1972 Louisiana gubernatorial election
- February 1, 1972
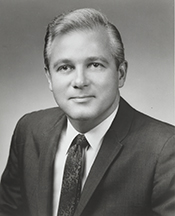

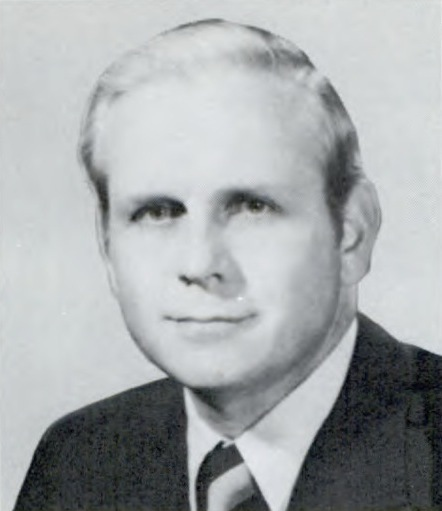
Nominee	Edwin Edwards	David Treen
Party	Democratic	Republican
Popular vote	641,146	480,424
Percentage	57.17%	42.83%
- Parish results Edwards: 50–60% 60–70% 70–80% 80–90% Treen: 50–60% 60–70%
Governor before election
John McKeithen
Democratic
Elected Governor
Edwin Edwards
Democratic

The 1972 Louisiana gubernatorial election was held on February 1, 1972. Edwin Edwards defeated Republican candidate David Treen to become Governor of Louisiana.

Party primaries were held on November 6, 1971, and a run-off was held for the Democratic nomination on December 18, 1971. These were the last closed primaries for Governor of Louisiana before the state adopted its current primary election system. This was also the last gubernatorial election not to take place in an off-year, as all elections starting from 1975 would take place 1 year before a presidential election.

== Mississippi ==
1971 Mississippi gubernatorial election
- November 2, 1971
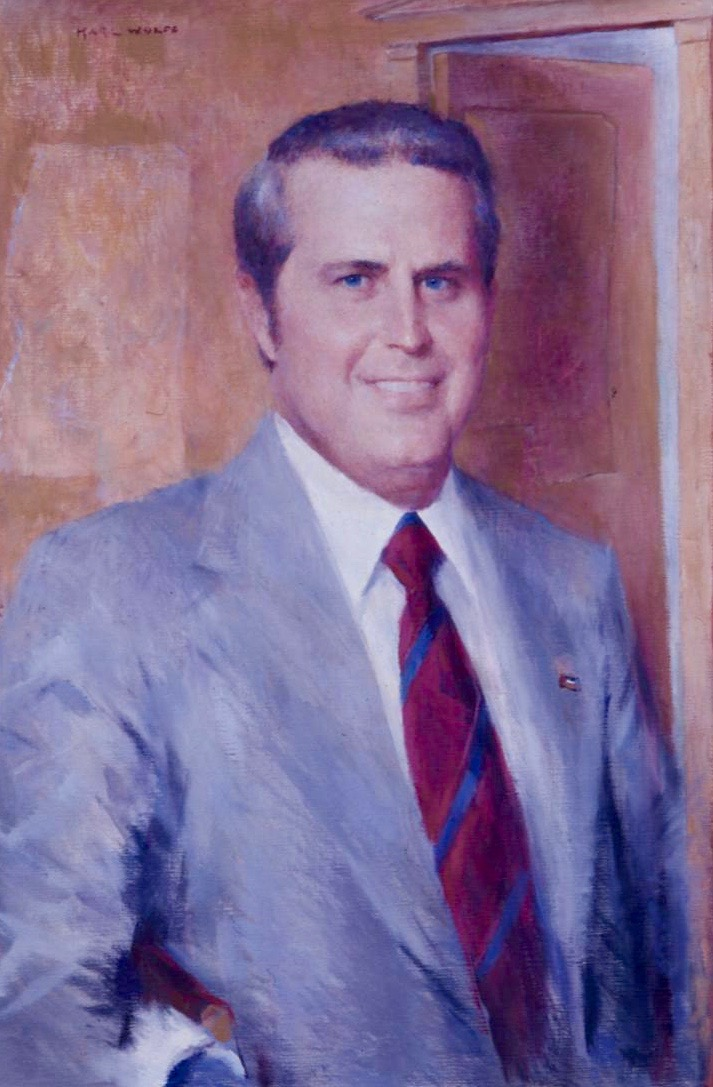

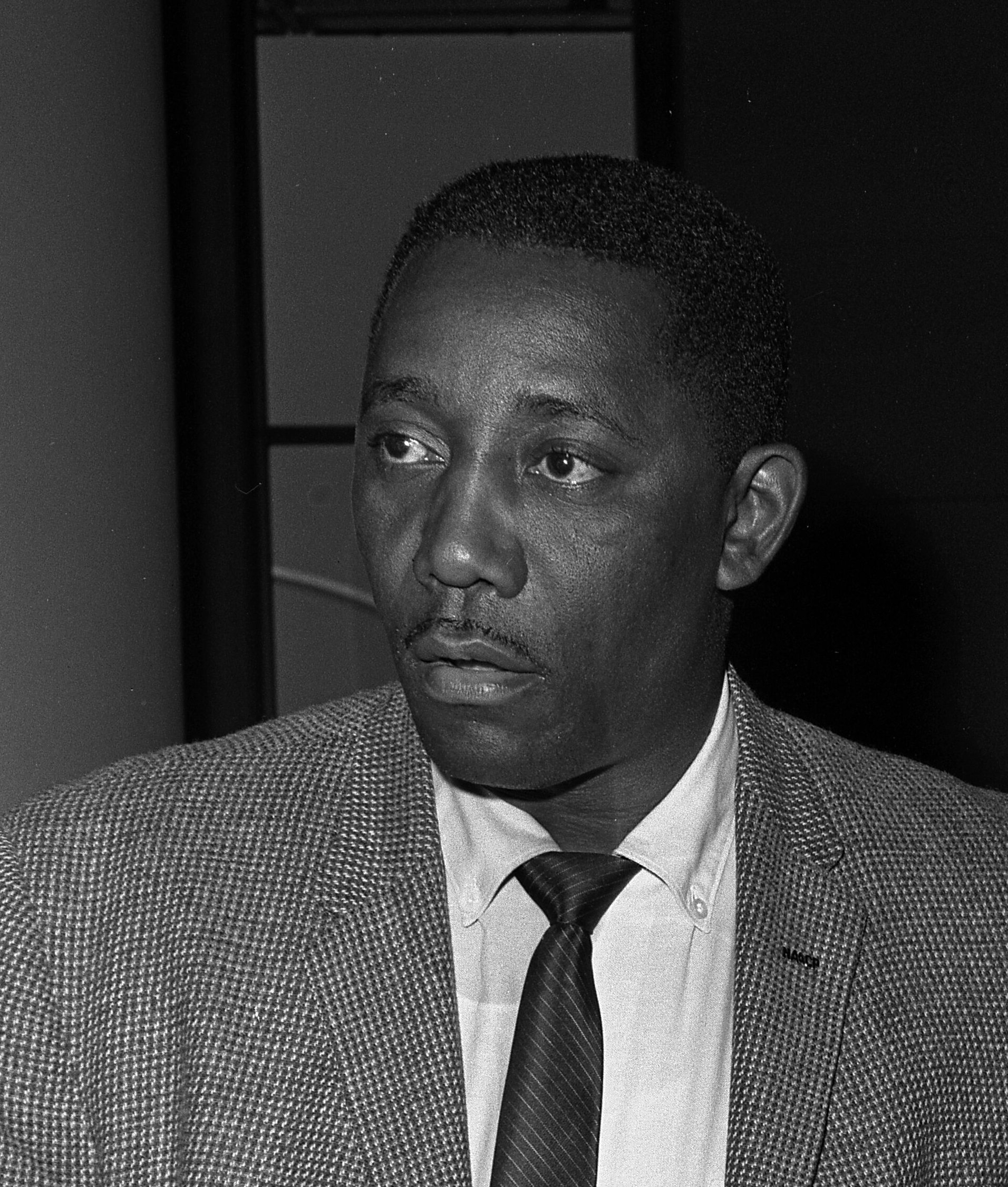
Nominee	Bill Waller	Charles Evers
Party	Democratic	Independent
Popular vote	601,222	172,762
Percentage	77.0%	22.1%
- County results Waller: 50-60% 60-70% 70-80% 80-90% >90% Evers: 40-50% 50-60% 60-70%
Governor before election
John Bell Williams
Democratic
Elected Governor
Bill Waller
Democratic

The 1971 Mississippi gubernatorial election took place on 2 November 1971 for the post of Governor of Mississippi. The incumbent governor, Democrat John Bell Williams, was ineligible due to term limits, a rule that was changed to two back-to-back terms in the 1980s.

Democrat Bill Waller, the former District Attorney of Hinds County, was chosen as his party's nominee in a contested primary. Running as an independent, Mayor of Fayette Charles Evers became the first African-American candidate for governor of Mississippi.
