= 1967 Mississippi gubernatorial election =

- November 7, 1967
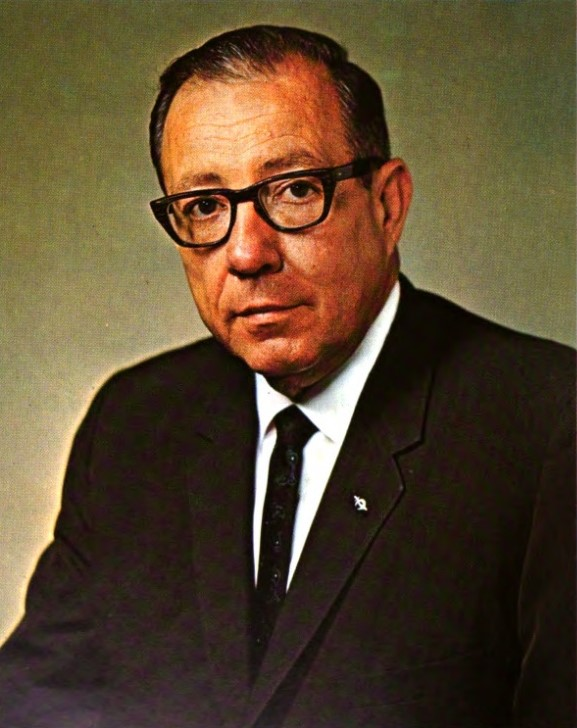

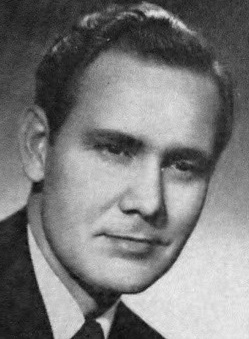
Nominee	John Bell Williams	Rubel Phillips
Party	Democratic	Republican
Popular vote	315,318	133,379
Percentage	70.27%	29.73%
- County results Williams: 50–60% 60–70% 70–80% 80–90% >90%
Governor before election
Paul B. Johnson Jr.
Democratic
Elected Governor
John Bell Williams
Democratic

The 1967 Mississippi gubernatorial election took place on November 7, 1967, in order to elect the Governor of Mississippi. Incumbent Democrat Paul B. Johnson Jr. was term-limited, and could not run for reelection to a second term.

== Democratic primary ==
No candidate received a majority in the Democratic primary, which featured seven contenders, so a runoff was held between the top two candidates.

It was the first Democratic primary for the governorship since the Civil Rights Act of 1964 and the Voting Rights Act of 1965, resulting in an increased registration for black voters from 29,500 to 195,000, making overt segregationist rhetoric less acceptable, as the Citizens' Councils complained by asking the contestants "why our ideals of states' rights and racial segregation" were not being "featured in this campaign as in the past". On the other hand, the abolition of poll tax benefited many poor whites, most of whom were supporters of segregation. As a result, each one of the seven candidates aired support for segregation, although to varying degrees.

Bill Waller, who prosecuted Byron De La Beckwith and attacked the Ku Klux Klan, additionally railed against civil rights "rabble-rousers". He was the more moderate candidate on the race question along with Winter, who had to embrace segregationist rhetoric to stay in the race.

Barnett attempted to make a comeback, but more militant segregationists complained he did not do enough during the Ole Miss riot of 1962. Staunch segregationist John Bell Williams ironically used the least overtly racist rhetoric since he could claim to have sacrificed his House career for Goldwater three years ago in 1964, although his supporters handed out flyers stating that "if William F. Winter is elected governor, the Negroes will run Mississippi."

The most openly segregationist candidate was Jimmy Swan, running on a promise to establish "FREE, private, SEGREGATED SCHOOLS for every white child in the State of Mississippi" in the first twelve months of his term, or else he would resign and publicly apologize. He proposed to save Mississippi "from the moral degeneracy of total mass integration that Washington has decreed for our children this fall", saying that granting equality to the blacks was to make savagery the equal of civilization and promising to use extreme force against any black urban riot, which he viewed as a "Communist monster", and openly courted the Klan, of which his campaign bodyguard Pat Massengale was a member. Such rhetoric might have contributed to the relatively less extremist voters moving to vote for Barnett, viewed as more moderate, and similarly winning most extreme segregationists from Barnett. Swan always wore a white suit to demonstrate his beliefs on race.

Vernon E. Brown, a 65-year-old tax assessor from Stone County, Mississippi, and C. L. McKinley, a Creole pipefitter living in Pennsylvania, had no campaign organization.

The runoff election was won by U.S. Representative John Bell Williams, who defeated state treasurer William Winter.

As was common at the time, the Democratic primary had higher turnout than the general election, as it was a given the Democrat would win. Black leaders avoided publicly supporting a candidate, out of fear that the candidate might lose votes. In some places, the MFDP called on blacks to boycott the primaries.

=== Results ===
Primary results by county: Winter: <30% 30–40% 40–50% 50–60% Williams: <30% 30–40% 40–50% 50–60% Swan: <30% 30–40% 40–50% 50–60% Barnett: 40–50%

Mississippi Democratic gubernatorial primary, 1967
Party	Candidate	Votes	%
Democratic	William Winter	222,001	32.46
Democratic	John Bell Williams	197,778	28.92
Democratic	Jimmy Swan	124,361	18.18
Democratic	Ross Barnett	76,053	11.12
Democratic	Bill Waller	60,090	8.79
Democratic	Vernon E. Brown	2,051	0.30
Democratic	C. L. McKinley	1,671	0.24
Total votes		684,005	100.00

=== Runoff ===
Runoff results by county: Williams: 50–60% 60–70% 70–80% Winter: 50–60% 60–70%

Mississippi Democratic gubernatorial primary runoff, 1967
Party	Candidate	Votes	%
Democratic	John Bell Williams	371,815	54.49
Democratic	William Winter	310,527	45.51
Total votes		682,342	100.00

== General election ==
=== Campaign ===
Phillips, a former Democratic public service commissioner, had no running-mate. His previous nominee for lieutenant governor, Stanford Morse, endorsed Williams. Phillips later said that the GOP did not at the time realize the importance of offering full candidate slates. The unopposed Democratic nominee for lieutenant governor, Charles L. Sullivan of Clarksdale, had defeated in his party's primary Governor Paul Johnson, who ran in 1967 for his former post of lieutenant governor. At the time Mississippi governors could not succeed themselves but could sit out a term and enter the next race four years later. Sullivan earlier said that he could work with either Phillips or Williams, but he endorsed the Democratic nominee, having verbally sparred with Phillips at a meeting in Biloxi of the Mississippi Manufacturing Association.

Clarke Reed of Greenville, who succeeded Yerger as state chairman in 1966, recalled that Phillips did not wish to run for governor again in 1967 but was persuaded to do so by party leaders in need of a candidate though there was little expectation of success. For his second race, Phillips shed his past segregationist image and ran to the middle, as had Williams' unsuccessful primary opponent, state Treasurer William F. Winter, who ultimately won the governorship in 1979. Time magazine called Phillips "an erstwhile segregationist who this year appealed for an end to the racial rancor". Phillips later said that his moderate stance hurt the Republicans at that time but that the party since "benefited from the things we did".

In a television address, Phillips reaffirmed his belief in segregation but spoke in conciliatory language toward African Americans:

The influence of race ... is so dominant that it is utterly unrealistic to expect any significant progress in such vital fields as education, economic development, and federal-state relations until we have brought the race issue out into the open and begun, at least begun, to deal with it effectively. ... I advocate spending money to develop our underdeveloped human resources ... with the expectation of getting all that money back ... With God's help and your help, I will bring peace and harmony and material progress to Mississippi.

The Meridian Star charged that Phillips had "made it plain that he is no conservative. He is a member of the Republican Party, not just here ... but at the national level." The Clarion-Ledger judged Phillips' in his second race as "a weak candidate with a weak pitch" and termed his prospects as virtually "hopeless".

Phillips took other heretical positions, having urged a "long-range master plan for education" and the reinstatement of compulsory attendance, which had been repealed in 1958. Phillips questioned the need of the Mississippi Milk Commission, which he said kept the price of milk artificially too high.

Presidential politics played some role in the 1967 campaign, as Williams stressed his friendship with George C. Wallace of Alabama, who was preparing for an independent candidacy in 1968. Phillips countered that only a Republican, perhaps Nixon or Governor Ronald Wilson Reagan of California, could defeat a national Democratic presidential nominee. Reagan cut a campaign commercial for Phillips; Maureen Reagan made some twenty appearances on Phillips' behalf at various places in the state. Neighboring Governor Winthrop Rockefeller of Arkansas, younger brother of Nelson Rockefeller, spoke in Corinth and assisted Phillips in fundraising. Phillips raised $300,000 in the 1967 race.

Williams rejected Phillips' pleas for debates, as had Paul Johnson in 1963. In fact, the congressman spent few days on the general election campaign trail and urged friends "to do the campaigning for me". Williams, who had lost the lower part of his left arm while service in the United States Army Air Corps during World War II, was hospitalized during the campaign with a leg ailment, which also stemmed from war injuries. At a $40 per person fundraiser attended by some five thousand and hosted by the state's congressional delegation, Williams vowed to "destroy that Republican crowd so bad that they won't be able to find a Rubel in the rubble."

=== Endorsements ===
Phillips obtained the endorsement of the Mississippi Freedom Democratic Party, which sent a rival delegation to the 1964 national party convention in Atlantic City, New Jersey, but he repudiated the support of that group. The Freedom Democrats backed Phillips because he had expressed doubts that Williams as governor would be able to fight the desegregation policies of the then United States Department of Health, Education and Welfare.

As in 1963, the Greenville Delta Democrat-Times endorsed Phillips, having hailed his racial-moderation speech as "frank, honest, courageous ... the unvarnished truth." The paper claimed that Phillips had abandoned the earlier GOP efforts to "out-Dixiecrat the Dixiecrats". An unidentified Republican told U.S. News & World Report that the GOP had "thrown off the tag of being a racist, segregationist party in the South."

== Results ==
1967 Mississippi gubernatorial election
Party	Candidate	Votes	%	±%
Democratic	John Bell Williams	315,318	70.27%	
Republican	Rubel Phillips	133,379	29.73%	
Total votes		448,697	100.00%	

=== County results ===
County	John Bell Williams	Votes	Rubel Phillips	Votes	Total
	Democratic		Republican		
Adams	64.32%	5,810	35.68	3,223	9,033
Alcorn	53.39%	3,468	46.61%	3,027	6,495
Amite	86.60%	2,631	13.40%	407	3,038
Attala	77.24%	3,834	22.76%	1,130	4,964
Benton	77.46%	928	22.54%	270	1,198
Bolivar	71.96%	6,432	28.04%	2,506	8,938
Calhoun	90.13%	3,143	9.87%	344	3,487
Carroll	78.17%	2,141	21.83%	598	2,739
Chickasaw	82.76%	2,976	17.24%	620	3,596
Choctaw	84.17%	1,850	15.83%	348	2,198
Claiborne	56.33%	1,309	43.67%	1,015	2,324
Clarke	74.75%	2,788	25.25%	942	3,730
Clay	69.98%	2,622	30.02%	1,125	3,747
Coahoma	71.12%	4,540	28.88%	1,844	6,384
Copiah	74.10%	4,434	25.90%	1,550	5,984
Covington	78.13%	2,851	21.87%	798	3,649
DeSoto	79.69%	3,175	20.31%	809	3,984
Forrest	60.61%	7,779	39.39%	5,056	12,835
Franklin	83.54%	2,055	16.46%	405	2,460
George	89.31%	1,979	10.69%	237	2,216
Greene	84.45%	1,390	15.55%	256	1,646
Grenada	64.59%	3,066	35.41%	1,681	4,747
Hancock	74.18%	2,534	25.82%	882	3,416
Harrison	68.77%	11,751	31.23%	5,336	17,087
Hinds	59.02%	26,077	40.98%	18,109	44,186
Holmes	53.61%	3,654	46.39%	3,162	6,816
Humphreys	76.20%	1,931	23.80%	603	2,534
Issaquena	65.84%	586	34.16%	304	890
Itawamba	83.58%	2,810	16.42%	552	3,362
Jackson	68.56%	8,165	31.44%	3,744	11,909
Jasper	74.22%	2,381	25.78%	827	3,208
Jefferson	54.74%	1,248	45.26%	1,032	2,280
Jefferson Davis	78.36%	2,194	21.64%	606	2,800
Jones	63.33%	9,096	36.67%	5,267	14,363
Kemper	85.70%	1,941	14.30%	324	2,265
Lafayette	68.13%	2,435	31.87%	1,139	3,574
Lamar	78.72%	3,200	21.28%	865	4,065
Lauderdale	66.11%	9,726	33.89%	4,986	14,712
Lawrence	82.51%	2,251	17.49%	477	2,728
Leake	73.97%	4,057	26.03%	1,428	5,485
Lee	73.94%	5,954	26.06%	2,099	8,053
Leflore	68.52%	5,133	31.48%	2,358	7,491
Lincoln	81.37%	4,985	18.63%	1,141	6,126
Lowndes	65.08%	5,986	34.92%	3,212	9,198
Madison	60.68%	3,401	39.32%	2,204	5,605
Marion	77.29%	5,096	22.71%	1,497	6,593
Marshall	69.44%	1,586	30.56%	698	2,284
Monroe	73.03%	4,691	26.97%	1,732	6,423
Montgomery	77.87%	2,452	22.13%	697	3,149
Neshoba	77.60%	4,777	22.40%	1,379	6,156
Newton	78.16%	4,011	21.84%	1,121	5,132
Noxubee	59.90%	1,746	40.10%	1,169	2,915
Oktibbeha	66.42%	3,165	33.58%	1,600	4,765
Panola	70.38%	3,331	29.62%	1,402	4,733
Pearl River	73.90%	3,769	26.10%	1,331	5,100
Perry	77.41%	1,573	22.59%	459	2,032
Pike	74.07%	6,119	25.93%	2,142	8,261
Pontotoc	85.28%	3,238	14.72%	559	3,797
Prentiss	81.34%	2,982	18.66%	684	3,666
Quitman	81.67%	1,867	18.33%	419	2,286
Rankin	71.77%	6,565	28.23%	2,582	9,147
Scott	78.40%	4,260	21.60%	1,174	5,434
Sharkey	69.64%	1,110	30.36%	484	1,594
Simpson	70.52%	3,868	29.48%	1,617	5,485
Smith	80.37%	3,730	19.63%	911	4,641
Stone	83.03%	1,453	16.97%	297	1,750
Sunflower	69.01%	4,320	30.99%	1,940	6,260
Tallahatchie	73.78%	2,395	26.22%	851	3,246
Tate	81.18%	2,994	18.82%	694	3,688
Tippah	80.91%	2,547	19.09%	601	3,148
Tunica	76.66%	1,406	23.34%	428	1,834
Union	75.86%	3,205	24.14%	1,020	4,225
Walthall	83.80%	3,005	16.20%	581	3,586
Warren	66.08%	6,330	33.92%	3,250	9,580
Washington	50.31%	5,529	49.69%	5,460	10,989
Wayne	76.46%	2,625	23.54%	808	3,433
Webster	86.75%	2,528	13.25%	386	2,914
Wilkinson	75.47%	1,640	24.53%	533	2,173
Winston	76.62%	3,091	23.38%	943	4,034
Yalobusha	83.27%	2,220	16.73%	446	2,666
Yazoo	72.27%	4,762	27.73%	1,827	6,589
Total	70.27%	315,318	29.73%	133,379	448,697
