= New South governor =

Moderate governors of the American South during the latter half of the twentieth century

New South governor is a term applied to various governors who led states in the Southern United States in the latter half of the twentieth century. Politically moderate or conservative, these governors were viewed as avoiding racial rhetoric and advocating reform of government institutions.

== History ==
In the early twentieth century, the Southern United States was characterized by Jim Crow racial segregation, widespread voter disenfranchisement, malapportionment of state legislative districts, and dominance by a single political party. At this time, governors' offices in the South were generally weak, and officeholders tended to be either political elites or adventurers. The United States Supreme Court's ruling in the 1954 case Brown v. Board of Education, the increased activity of the civil rights movement, and the creation of civil rights legislation altered these political dynamics. The passage of the Voting Rights Act in 1965 enabled the massive growth of black voter registration and black political participation. As a result, black voters began to combine their electoral strength with white moderates to alter the outcomes of regional elections.

New South governors tended to avoid race-baiting campaigning or strong affirmations in favor of segregation. Their campaigns were also more modernized and media driven, and they tended to rely upon coalitions of moderate and liberal white voters and African Americans. Terry Sanford was the first New South governor, being elected Governor of North Carolina in 1960. He emphasized peaceful race relations, improvements in education, and vigorous economic development. Carl Sanders of Georgia was elected in 1962. Several New South governors were elected in 1970: Reubin Askew in Florida, John C. West in South Carolina, Dale Bumpers in Arkansas, and Jimmy Carter in Georgia. Many national media outlets celebrated the election of these politicians as a sign of change and social progress in the region. Bumpers described these electoral outcomes as "a cry for new leadership in the South". All declared upon their inaugurations that they would avoid racial issues of the past, and in office they tended to ignore racially-charged issues, careful not to alienate white voters. Bill Waller won election in Mississippi in 1971, and was succeeded in 1975 by Cliff Finch, who was described by The New York Times as emblematic of the New South.

By 1972, all Southern states except Alabama had elected a governor who espoused racially moderate rhetoric. Albert Brewer assumed the office of governor in Alabama in 1968 but was not elected, and was defeated in an electoral campaign for a full term in 1970. The victor, George Wallace, ran a racially-charged campaign but won the primary runoff by a narrow margin over Brewer and moderated his stance after taking office.

A second group of New South governors were later elected, including Richard Riley of South Carolina, Bob Graham of Florida, George Busbee of Georgia, David Treen of Louisiana, William F. Winter of Mississippi, Lamar Alexander of Tennessee, Chuck Robb of Virginia, David Pryor and Bill Clinton of Arkansas, and James Holshouser, Jim Hunt, and James G. Martin of North Carolina. Many of these governors cited Sanford as an inspiration. Some of these governors sought national political influence, and two were elected President of the United States: Carter in 1976, and Clinton in 1992. Most New South governors were replaced by more conservative officeholders in the 1980s and 1990s. The last New South governor is considered to be North Carolina's Jim Hunt, who left office in 2001. The last New South governor in any elected office was Lamar Alexander, who served 18 years as a Senator from 2003 to 2021.

== Ideology and characteristics ==
New South governors tended to be well-educated, sometimes having been educated outside of the South. In office, they were active executives and proponents of government reform, emphasizing executive leadership, efficiency, and honesty. Some supported new government services, but typically avoided large tax increases. The extent of reform they supported was generally limited to education, mental health services, and prisons. Most favored public investment in infrastructure, but not redistributionist programs. Many were economically conservative. New South governors also avoided racial rhetoric and took a moderate approach towards racial issues. These positions were guided by a desire to attract outside investment and strengthen professional workforces. They also tried to cultivate better relationships with the federal government than their predecessors, who had been more focused on states' rights.

== New South governors ==
Ascended to office through death or resignation of incumbent governor

Governor	Party	State	Term			Notes
Governor	Party	State	Start	End	Length of service	Notes
Terry Sanford	Democratic	North Carolina	January 5, 1961	January 8, 1965	4 years, 3 days	Later served as U.S. Senator from 1986 to 1993.
Carl Sanders	Democratic	(Georgia (U.S. state)) Georgia	January 14, 1963	January 10, 1967	3 years, 361 days	
Albert Brewer	Democratic	Alabama	May 7, 1968	January 18, 1971	2 years, 256 days	
Reubin Askew	Democratic	Florida	January 5, 1971	January 2, 1979	7 years, 362 days	
Dale Bumpers	Democratic	Arkansas	January 12, 1971	January 3, 1975	3 years, 356 days	Later served as U.S. Senator from 1975 to 1999.
Jimmy Carter	Democratic	(Georgia (U.S. state)) Georgia	January 12, 1971	January 14, 1975	4 years, 2 days	Later served as President of the United States from 1977 to 1981.
John C. West	Democratic	South Carolina	January 19, 1971	January 21, 1975	4 years, 2 days	
Bill Waller	Democratic	Mississippi	January 18, 1972	January 20, 1976	4 years, 2 days	
James Holshouser	Republican	North Carolina	January 5, 1973	January 8, 1977	4 years, 3 days	
David Pryor	Democratic	Arkansas	January 14, 1975	January 3, 1979	3 years, 354 days	Later served as U.S. Senator from 1979 to 1997.
George Busbee	Democratic	(Georgia (U.S. state)) Georgia	January 14, 1975	January 11, 1983	7 years, 362 days	
Cliff Finch	Democratic	(Georgia (U.S. state)) Mississippi	January 20, 1976	January 22, 1980	4 years, 2 days	
Jim Hunt	Democratic	North Carolina	January 8, 1977; January 9, 1993	January 5, 1985; January 6, 2001	15 years, 364 days	
Bob Graham	Democratic	Florida	January 2, 1979	January 3, 1987	8 years, 1 day	Later served as U.S. Senator from 1987 to 2005.
Bill Clinton	Democratic	Arkansas	January 9, 1979; January 11, 1983	January 19, 1981; December 22, 1992	11 years, 356 days	Later served as President of the United States from 1993 to 2001.
Richard Riley	Democratic	South Carolina	January 10, 1979	January 14, 1987	8 years, 4 days	
Lamar Alexander	Republican	Tennessee	January 20, 1979	January 17, 1987	7 years, 362 days	Later served as U.S. Senator from 2003 to 2021.
William F. Winter	Democratic	(Georgia (U.S. state)) Mississippi	January 22, 1980	January 10, 1984	3 years, 353 days	
Dave Treen	Republican	Louisiana	March 10, 1980	March 12, 1984	4 years, 2 days	
Chuck Robb	Democratic	Virginia	January 16, 1982	January 18, 1986	4 years, 2 days	Later served as U.S. Senator from 1989 to 2001.
James G. Martin	Republican	North Carolina	January 5, 1985	January 9, 1993	8 years, 4 days	

== Works cited ==
- Drescher, John (2000). Triumph of Good Will: How Terry Sanford Beat a Champion of Segregation in and Reshaped the South. Jackson: University Press of Mississippi. ISBN 1-57806-310-8. - Read online, registration required.
- Evans, Eli N. (1993). The Lonely Days Were Sundays. University of Mississippi Press. ISBN 9781617035036.
- Gretlund, Jan Nordby, ed. (1999). The Southern State of Mind. University of South Carolina Press. ISBN 9781570033124. - Link to profile at Google Books
- Harvey, Gordon E. (2002). A Question of Justice: New South Governors and Education, 1968-1976. Tuscaloosa: The University of Alabama Press. ISBN 9780817311575.
- Sanders, Randy (2007). Mighty Peculiar Elections: The New South Gubernatorial Campaigns of 1970 and the Changing Politics of Race (reprint ed.). Louisiana State University Press. ISBN 9780807132906.
- Wirt, Frederick M. (1997). We Ain't what We was: Civil Rights in the New South. Duke University Press. ISBN 9780822318934. - Profile at Google Books
