= Vernon H. Broom =

American judge (1924–)

Vernon Herrin Broom

Justice of the Supreme Court of Mississippi
- In office 1973–1984

Personal details
- Born: January 16, 1924 Columbia, Marion County, Mississippi, U.S.
- Died: January 6, 1989 (aged 64) Columbia, Marion County, Mississippi, U.S.
- Education: Columbia High School; Pearl River Community College; B.B.A., University of Mississippi; LL.B., University of Mississippi
- Occupation: Lawyer; judge

Vernon Herrin Broom (January 16, 1924 – January 6, 1989) was an American lawyer and judge who served as a justice of the Supreme Court of Mississippi from 1973 to 1984.

== Early life, education, and military service ==
Born in Columbia, Marion County, Mississippi, to John Calvin Broom and Bertha Herrin Broom, he was educated at Columbia High School and Pearl River Community College, before receiving a B.B.A. and an LL.B from the University of Mississippi.

Broom served in the United States Army in World War II, "in the First Infantry Division in Belgium, France and Germany". "He was awarded the Combat Infantry Badge, the Purple Heart and the Bronze Star".

From 1952 to 1964, Broom was district attorney for the Mississippi 15th Judicial District.

== Judicial service ==
In 1970, Broom was elected as a judge of Mississippi 15th Judicial District.

Governor Bill Waller initially named Broom to the state supreme court as a temporary replacement for ailing Justice Thomas Pickens Brady, on October 5, 1972.

On February 8, 1973, Broom was appointed by Governor Waller to formally fill the seat vacated by the death of Brady. Broom then ran unopposed for the last two years of this term in 1974.

He ran unopposed again in 1976, and retired on February 15, 1984.

== Later life ==
Broom died on January 6, 1989, a week and a half before turning 65. A funeral for him was held the following day and he was buried in Woodlawn Cemetery in Columbia.

== Works cited ==
- Southwick, Leslie (1998). "Mississippi Supreme Court Elections: A Historical Perspective 1916-1996". Mississippi College Law Review. 18 (1): 115–198.

Political offices
Preceded by Thomas Pickens Brady	Justice of the Supreme Court of Mississippi; 1973–1984	Succeeded by Michael D. Sullivan
