= 1971 Mississippi gubernatorial election =

- November 2, 1971
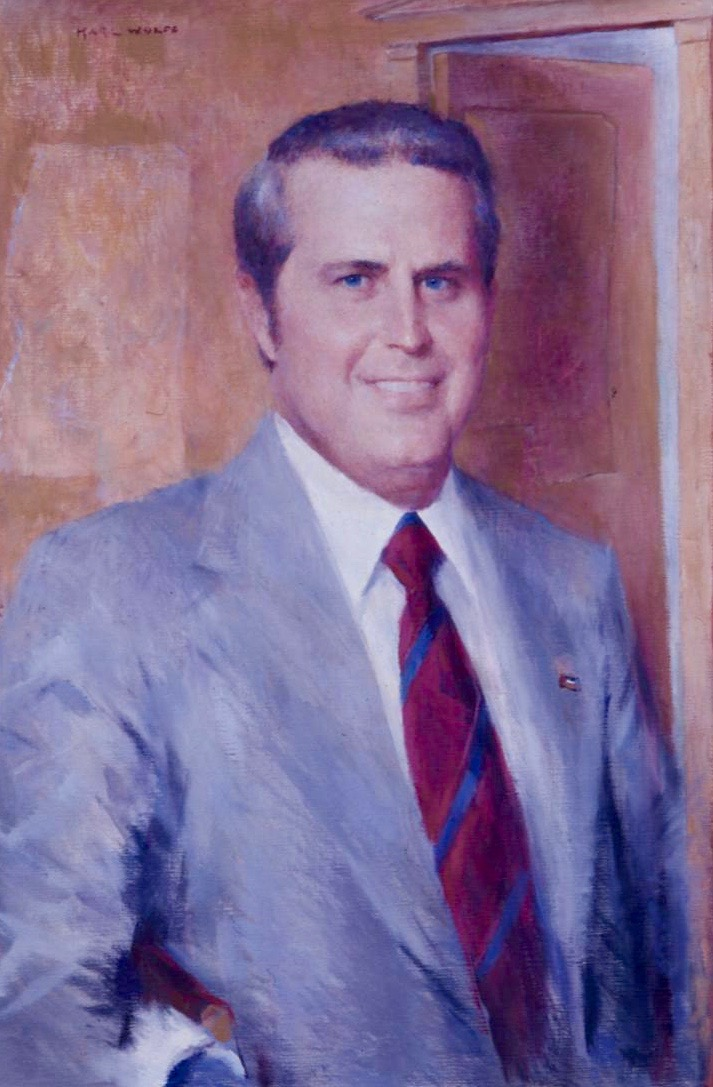

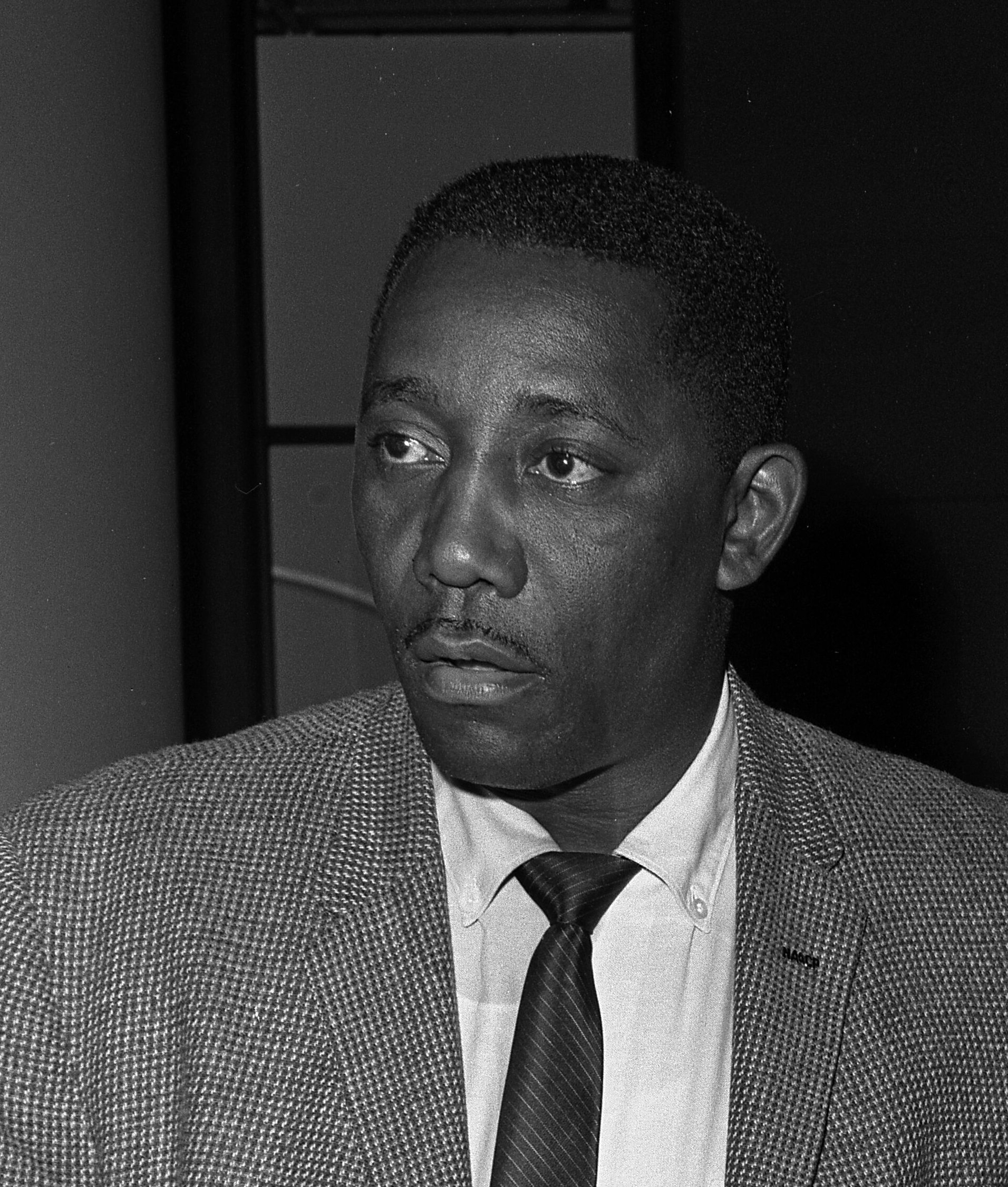
Nominee	Bill Waller	Charles Evers
Party	Democratic	Independent
Popular vote	601,222	172,762
Percentage	77.02%	22.13%
- County results Waller: 50–60% 60–70% 70–80% 80–90% >90% Evers: 40–50% 50–60% 60–70%
Governor before election
John Bell Williams
Democratic
Elected Governor
Bill Waller
Democratic

The 1971 Mississippi gubernatorial election took place on 2 November 1971 for the post of Governor of Mississippi. The incumbent governor, Democrat John Bell Williams, was ineligible due to term limits, a rule that was changed to two back-to-back terms in the 1980s.

Democrat Bill Waller, the former District Attorney of Hinds County, was chosen as his party's nominee in a contested primary. Running as an independent, mayor of Fayette Charles Evers became the first African-American candidate for governor of Mississippi.

To date, this is the most recent time that Rankin County voted Democratic in a gubernatorial election.

== Democratic primary ==
=== Candidates ===
- Roy C. Adams, former state highway commissioner from Tupelo
- Marshall Perry, circuit court judge from Grenada
- Edwin L. Pittman, state senator from Hattiesburg
- Andrew W. Sullivan, Jackson oilman
- Charles L. Sullivan, Lieutenant Governor of Mississippi
- Jimmy Swan, country music singer from Hattiesburg and candidate for governor in 1967
- Bill Waller, former Hinds County prosecutor and candidate for governor in 1967

=== Results ===
Primary results by county: Sullivan: <30% 30–40% 40–50% 50–60% 60–70% 70–80% Waller: <30% 30–40% 40–50% Swan: 30–40% Adams: 40–50% Perry: 30–40%

Mississippi Democratic Party primary, 1971
Party	Candidate	Votes	%
Democratic	Charles L. Sullivan	288,219	37.78
Democratic	William L. Waller	227,424	29.81
Democratic	James E. "Jimmy" Swan	128,946	16.90
Democratic	Roy C. Adams	45,445	5.96
Democratic	Ed Pittman	38,170	5.00
Democratic	Marshall Perry	18,021	2.36
Democratic	Andrew W. Sullivan	16,762	2.20

=== Democratic primary runoff ===
Runoff results by county: Waller: 50–60% 60–70% Sullivan: 50–60% 60–70% 70–80% 80–90%

Mississippi Democratic Party primary runoff, August 24, 1971
Party	Candidate	Votes	%
Democratic	William L. Waller	389,952	54.22
Democratic	Charles L. Sullivan	329,236	45.78

== Republican primary ==
No Republican primary was held.

== General election ==
=== Candidates ===
- Thomas Pickens Brady, Brookhaven judge (Independent)
- Charles Evers, mayor of Fayette (Independent)
- Bill Waller, former Hinds County prosecutor and candidate for governor in 1967 (Democratic)

=== Campaign ===
Evers' campaign was supported by civil rights leader Coretta Scott King, the Congressional Black Caucus, and Mayor of New York John Lindsay.

According to The New York Times, Waller ran a relatively moderate campaign. However, one report noted that Waller's campaign featured "racially ragged edges", such as airing radio commercials that played the song "Dixie" and receiving support from segregationist politicians like James Eastland.

Following Waller's victory, Evers drove across town to a local TV station to congratulate him. A reporter later wrote that:

Waller's aides learned Evers was in the building and tried to hustle the governor-elect out of the studio as soon as the interview ended. They were not quite quick enough. Surrounded by photographers, reporters, and television crews, Evers approached Waller's car just as it was about to pull out. Waller and his wife were in the back seat. "I just wanted to congratulate you," said Evers. "Whaddya say, Charlie?" boomed Waller. His wife leaned across with a stiff smile and shook the loser's hand. During the campaign Evers told reporters that his main purpose in running was to encourage registration of black voters.

=== Results ===
Mississippi gubernatorial election, 1971
Candidate	Votes	%	±
Democratic	William L. Waller	601,222	77.02
Independent	Charles Evers	172,762	22.13
Independent	Tom P. Brady	6,653	0.85

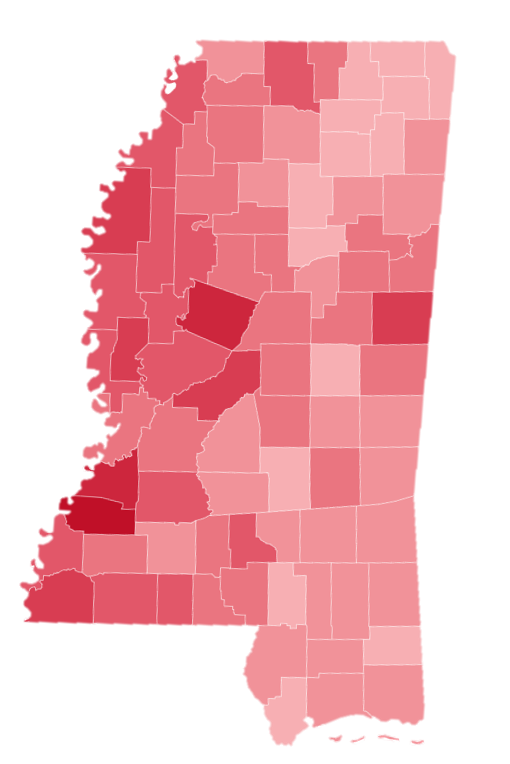
Evers' performance by county Legend: 60-70%; 50-60%; 40-50%; 30-40%; 20-30%; 10-20%; 0-10%
