= Bill Waller =

American politician (1926–2011)

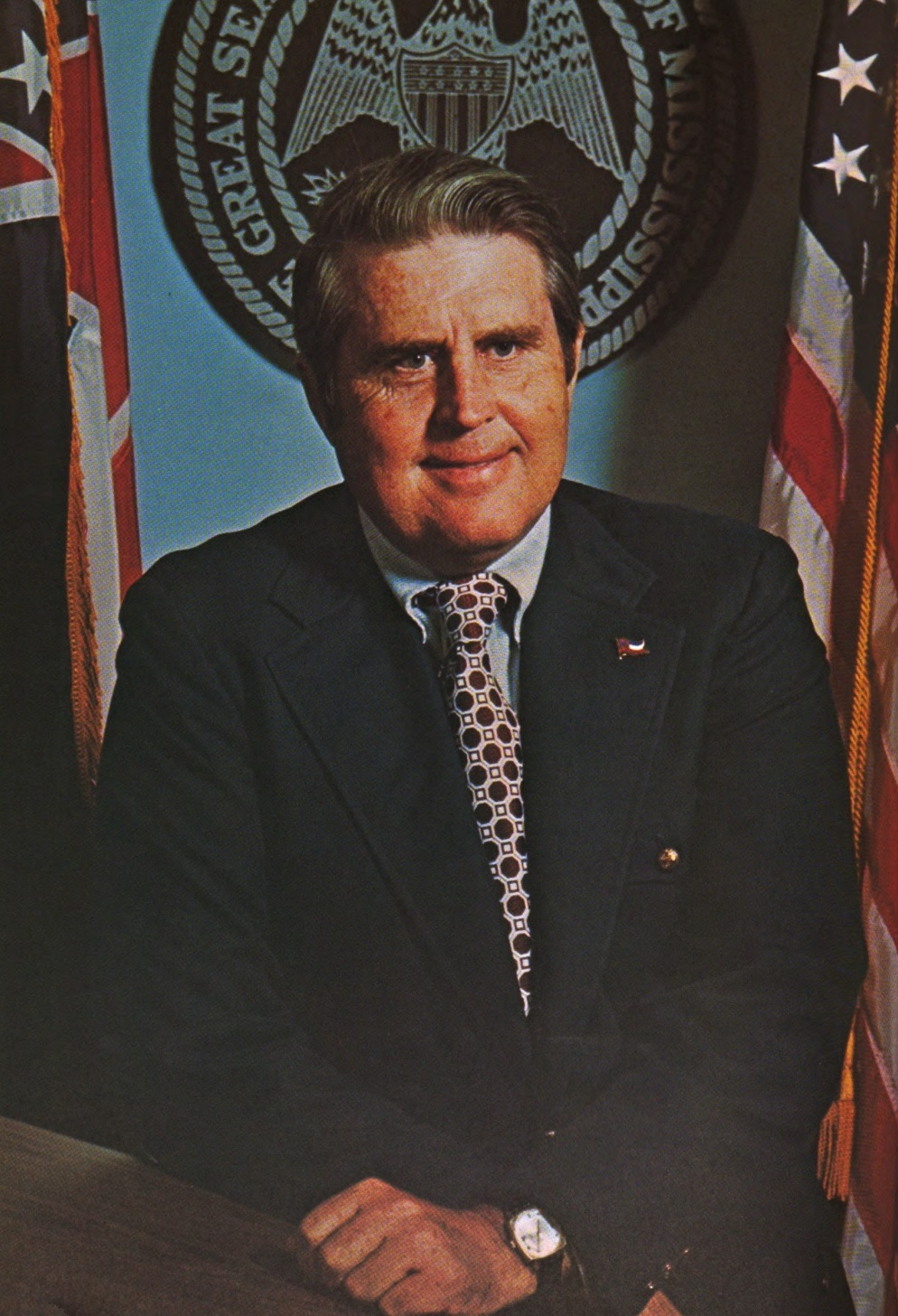
- Official portrait, c. 1976

56th Governor of Mississippi
- In office January 18, 1972 – January 20, 1976
- Lieutenant: William F. Winter
- Preceded by: John Bell Williams
- Succeeded by: Cliff Finch

Personal details
- Born: William Lowe Waller; October 21, 1926 Lafayette County, Mississippi, U.S.
- Died: November 30, 2011 (aged 85) Jackson, Mississippi, U.S.
- Resting place: Jessamine Cemetery; Ridgeland, Mississippi, U.S.
- Party: Democratic
- Spouse: Ava Carroll Overton (m. 1950)
- Children: 5, including Bill
- Education: Memphis State University (BS); University of Mississippi School of Law (LLB)

Military service
- Allegiance: United States
- Branch/service: United States Army
- Years of service: 1951–1953
- Rank: Sergeant
- Battles/wars: Korean War

William Lowe Waller Sr. (October 21, 1926 – November 30, 2011) was an American politician and attorney. A Democrat, Waller served as the 56th governor of Mississippi from 1972 to 1976. Born near Oxford, Mississippi to a farming family, Waller went to law school and in 1950 established a law practice in Jackson. Nine years later, he was elected District Attorney of Hinds County, Mississippi. Waller attempted to reform the position and provoked the ire of local law enforcement for aggressively prosecuting several cases. In 1964, he twice prosecuted Byron De La Beckwith for the murder of civil rights activist Medgar Evers, with both trials resulting in deadlocked juries. In 1967, he launched an unsuccessful campaign for governor, finishing fifth in the Democratic primary.

Waller ran for governor again in 1971, denouncing state establishment leaders and winning in the primary and in the general election. Taking office in January 1972, he associated himself with the New South governors, his moderate contemporaries in other Southern states. Though unsuccessful in reconciling racial differences within the Mississippi Democratic Party, he brought African Americans into state government and successfully shut down the State Sovereignty Commission. His tenure was also marked by his significant disagreement with the Mississippi State Legislature. After leaving gubernatorial office in 1976, Waller returned to practicing law in Jackson. He ran for a U.S. Senate seat in 1978 and for governor again in 1987, losing both races. He released his memoirs in 2007 and died four years later.

== Early life ==
Waller was born on October 21, 1926, near Oxford in Lafayette County, Mississippi, to Percy A. Waller and Myrtle Gatewood. He and his two siblings worked on their parents' 300 acres (1.2 km^{2}) farm in their youth. The family was not affluent, but fared better than many of their neighbors during the Great Depression. Waller's father was involved in local politics and a friend of politician Ross Barnett, who later became governor of the state. He attended public schools in the Black Jack community of Panola County before graduating from University High School in Oxford in 1944. He earned a bachelor's degree in business administration from Memphis State University and a bachelor of laws from the University of Mississippi School of Law.

In 1950, Waller established a legal practice in Jackson, Mississippi. He served in the United States Army as an intelligence officer during the Korean War, attaining the rank of sergeant. He was offered a commission in the intelligence corps, but he declined, being discharged on November 30, 1953. He returned to Jackson to active Army Reserve duty and resumed his legal career. He married Carroll Waller on November 11, 1950 and had four sons and a daughter with her. One of his sons, Bill Waller Jr., later served as Chief Justice of the Supreme Court of Mississippi and made an unsuccessful bid for gubernatorial office in 2019.

== Early political career ==
Waller was elected District Attorney of the Seventh Judicial District of Mississippi (Hinds County) in 1959 and was reelected in 1963. He was sworn in on January 2, 1960. At the time he took office, the district attorney in Hinds County was a part-time job with little expected of its incumbent. Many previous attorneys had used the office to promote their own private legal services. Waller attempted to reform the position, and provoked the ire of local law enforcement for aggressively prosecuting several cases, including a white man who had murdered a black man and a wealthy woman who had murdered her husband. Despite this, his legal practice expanded during his tenure with several new partners. He also befriended Mississippi political columnist Bill Minor.

As the district attorney, Waller prosecuted Byron De La Beckwith in the murder of civil rights advocate Medgar Evers in two trials in 1964, both of which resulted in mistrials due to deadlocked juries. Waller did not approve of Evers' activism and did not view the trials as a means to denounce Jim Crow racial segregation, but saw it as an opportunity to demonstrate that laws would be upheld in the state. Most observers agreed Waller ably presented his case against Beckwith, establishing his rifle as the murder weapon and using witnesses to establish his presence in the vicinity of the killing on the night it had occurred. Though worried that it might backfire among the white jury members, Waller also attempted to establish a motive for the murder by getting Beckwith to testify to his support for white supremacy and staunch opposition to racial integration. Fears among white Mississippians that Waller was a "liberal" for trying De Le Beckwith led his firm to lose clients. Numerous observers speculated that the trials would damage his political prospects, with The New York Times writing in February 1964 that "He may have put his career on the block by his tireless prosecution of the case". Despite this, he won some national acclaim for convincing several white jurors to vote for conviction and ingratiated himself to Mississippi's black population. Beckwith was later convicted after a third trial in 1994.

By the mid-1960s, Waller was disenchanted with Mississippi's political leaders' hardline efforts to resist desegregation. In 1967, he ran for the office of governor in the Democratic primary. Not backed by a significant campaign organization, he was low on resources and confined to active campaigning on the weekends. The contest was dominated by issues of race. Waller attempted to straddle both sides of the issue, becoming the first Mississippian gubernatorial candidate to ever publicly condemn the Ku Klux Klan while also criticizing civil rights activists and praising the work of Citizens' Councils. Largely ignored by the public in favor of other segregationist candidates, he placed fifth in the primary, earning 60,090 votes, only nine percent of the vote.

== Gubernatorial career ==
=== 1971 campaign and election ===
In 1971, Waller mounted another campaign for gubernatorial office, facing Lieutenant Governor Charles L. Sullivan, Jimmy Swan, and four others in the Democratic primary. While Swan resorted to racist appeals and declared his opposition to integration, Waller and Sullivan focused on other matters, though they both affirmed their support for "law and order" and segregation academies, and opposed desegregation busing. They also pledged to appoint blacks to state offices. Waller stated that he was running against the "Capitol Street Gang", establishment industry leaders and lawyers in Jackson he said had acted as a political machine and captured control of state government, preventing Mississippi from economically developing. He declared his support for raising teacher salaries and investing more funds in state highways. He hired Deloss Walker of Memphis, Tennessee, as a campaign consultant, beginning a trend of gubernatorial candidates using out-of-state advertising agencies which lasted into the 1980s.

The primary went into a runoff between Waller and Sullivan, Waller garnered the endorsements of U.S. Senator James Eastland and former governor Barnett, and relied on a network of Eastland supporters to organize grassroots backing for himself. He attacked Sullivan as an "establishment" figure and won the runoff with 54 percent of the vote, taking 389,952 votes to Sullivan's 329,236. In the general election Waller faced two independents, civil rights activist Charles Evers (the brother of Medgar) and segregationist judge Tom P. Brady. Evers was the other major candidate and, despite the fears of public observers, the campaign was largely devoid of racism and both him and Waller avoided negative tactics. Waller won with 601,222 votes to Evers' 172,762 and Brady's 6,653. He was inaugurated as Governor of Mississippi on January 18, 1972.

=== Executive action and appointments ===
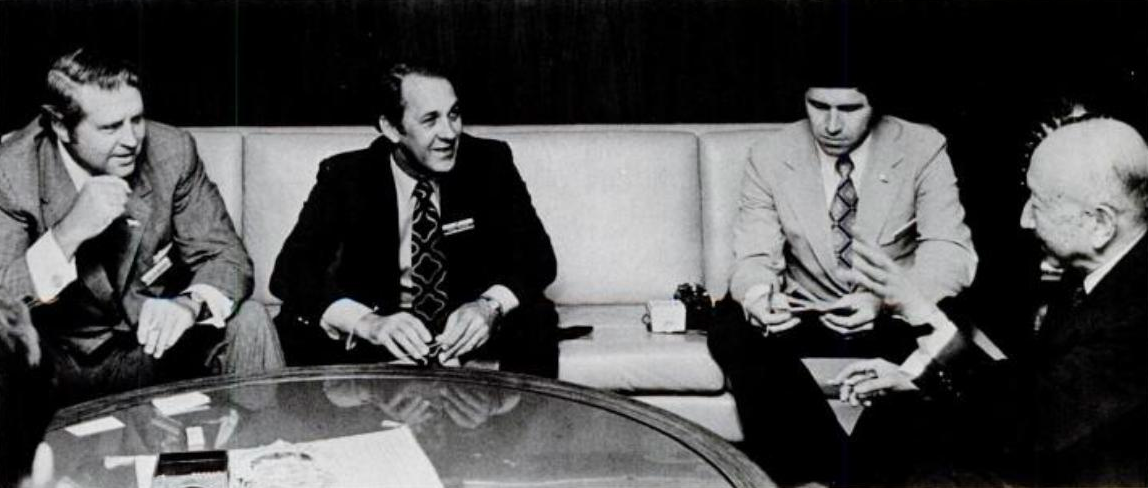
Waller (far left) leading a Mississippi trade delegation in Tokyo, 1973

As governor, Waller began hosting weekly press conferences. He was ex officio a member of Mississippi State Sovereignty Commission and responsible for appointing several other of its members. The sovereignty commission was responsible for upholding segregation in the state, though by the time Waller took office it had little business to conduct. He delayed in naming his appointees to the body and sent a representative to its meetings in lieu of his attendance. In 1973 he vetoed the commission's funding bill, leading it to shut down in June before being formally abolished in 1977. Despite some criticism in the press over costs, he directed the purchase of the state's first jet to serve as official transportation for state officials. He undertook several trips to Europe, Asia, and South America to secure business deals for the state.

Waller appointed several Black individuals to positions in state government and his staff, the first time this had been done since the Reconstruction era, but most had no history of political activity. His first black appointee was Jim Rundles as a special assistant. Rundles was known as a mild-mannered man who had refused to take part in civil rights demonstrations. He also appointed the first black woman to a state board in Mississippi's history and integrated the Mississippi Highway Patrol. On the whole, his administration was overwhelmingly staffed by whites. He created a Minority Advisory Committee and an Office of Minority Business Enterprise. In August 1972, he became the first Mississippi governor to visit the territory of the Mississippi Band of Choctaw Indians when he spoke at the opening of the Choctaw Indian Fair.

At the onset of his term, Waller and his family decided not to move into the Mississippi Governor's Mansion, which had fallen into disrepair. Waller's wife led a campaign to restore the house, and the family eventually occupied it in May 1975. Unlike his predecessors and successors, Waller refused to use convicts as servants in the mansion. In 1972, he authorized the work release of Charles Wilson, one of the men convicted of murdering civil rights activist Vernon Dahmer. Waller had served as legal counsel for the convicted murderer prior to his election, and his action drew scrutiny from blacks. Waller responded to criticism by saying that Wilson, who made artificial limbs, was needed for his skills in Laurel, Mississippi, and by releasing Hal C. Zachary, a black college graduate who had murdered a segregationist, under the same program. The following week, Waller declared that Medgar Evers Day would be celebrated on the tenth anniversary of the civil rights leader's death, but then did not attended the formal ceremony marking the date. Some observers saw this declaration as an attempt to deflect from the release authorization.

=== Legislative action ===
By the time Waller took office, the position of governor in Mississippi had long been subordinated in policy matters to the legislature. Waller announced large annual legislative proposals, but made little effort to build relationships with legislative leaders, including Lieutenant Governor William F. Winter and Speaker of the House of Representatives John R. Junkin. Waller rarely informed Winter when he was leaving the state, meaning the latter often discovered that he was to be acting governor from newspaper stories. Waller disregard Junkin's advice to leave most matters of public importance to the legislature, and came into frequent conflict with the body, vetoing 32 bills during his tenure. His relationship with legislators was poor on an individual level, and he would seek support for his ideas from the public rather than them. The legislature overrode some of his vetoes, the first time it had done so to a governor in 44 years.

Waller proposed several reform measures which were opposed by older and more rural legislators. He supported efforts to create public kindergartens and reenact a compulsory education law, but these measures all died in the Senate. He appointed a blue ribbon committee to make recommendations on higher education, but the board of trustees of the University of Mississippi refused to cooperate with it or accept its criticisms of the university system. He supported the legislature's creation of new schools at Mississippi State University. In February 1974, he vetoed a special appropriation bill for university libraries construction, arguing that the university system did not require additional capital outlays. He also backed an unsuccessful bill to set limits on campaign spending. The legislature ignored his proposals to redraft the state constitution and permit gubernatorial succession.

Waller endorsed the funding of a $600 million highway program, but the proposal had been devised during his predecessor's tenure and declining government revenues led it to be later suspended. He initially backed a reform of the state's tax structure and the raising of the oil and gas severance tax, but later backed away from these efforts due to opposition from legislators and lobbyists. He successfully secured funding for a new Mississippi Highway Patrol headquarters and enhancements to the state crime laboratory. He also convinced the legislature to remove tax collection responsibilities from the duties of county sheriffs.

=== Political affairs ===
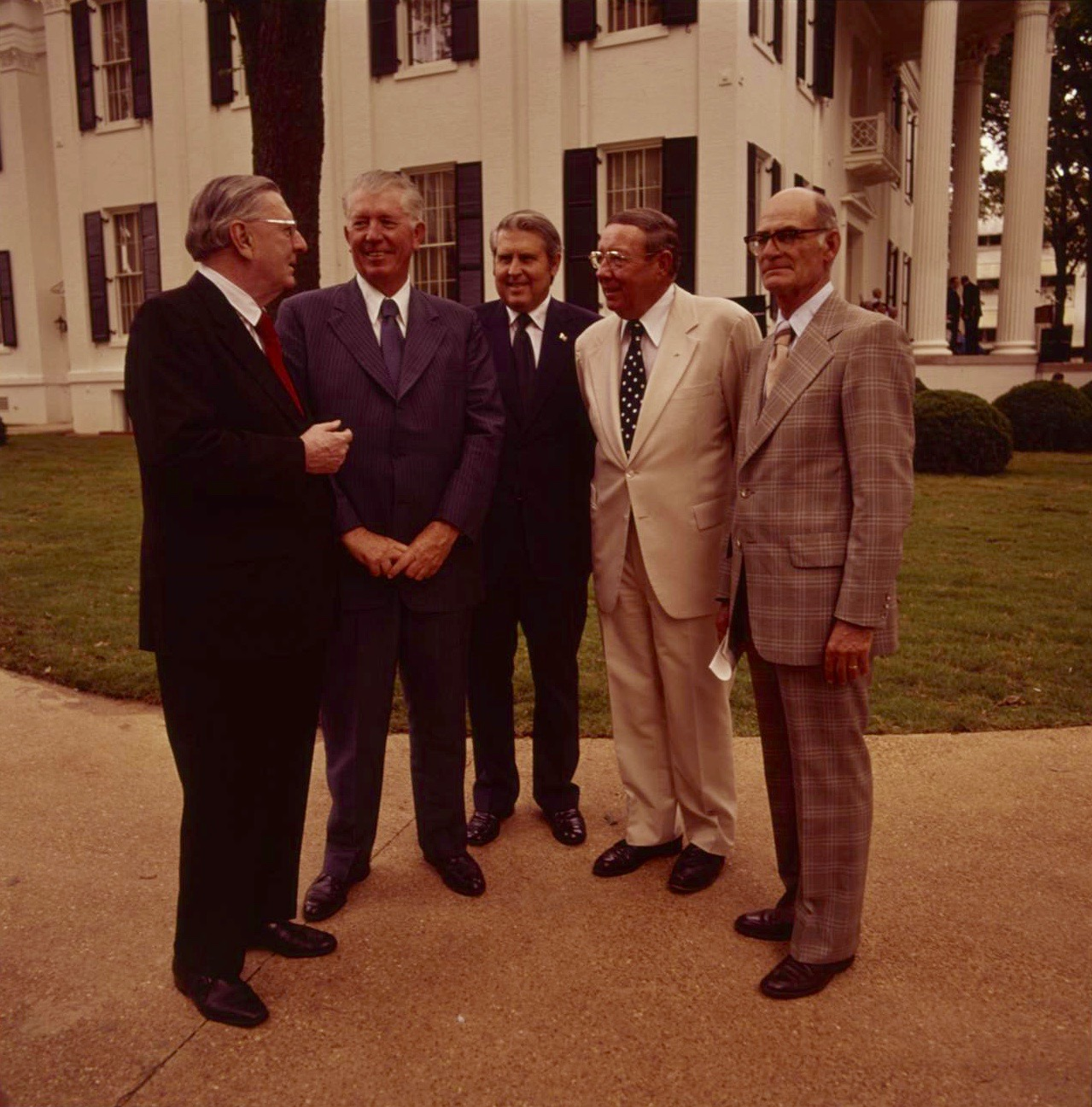
Waller (center) with other former governors of Mississippi, 1976

Waller associated himself with the New South governors, his moderate contemporaries in other Southern states, and distanced himself from Alabama's staunchly segregationist governor, George Wallace. At the time he took office, the Mississippi Democratic Party was split into two factions: the Regulars, composed of white segregationists, and the Loyalists, composed of black members of the Mississippi Freedom Democratic Party and moderate whites. In anticipation of the 1972 Democratic National Convention, Waller encouraged the Regular and Loyalist factions to re-unify, fearing that the convention would exclude the Regulars otherwise.

Waller initially rejected a meeting with Loyalist leader Aaron Henry to reach a compromise, but later offered to give the Loyalists 40% representation in a mixed convention delegation. The offer was rebuffed and the convention ultimately seated the Loyalist faction's own delegation. Negotiations between the two groups continued throughout Waller's tenure. As part of this, Waller signed a law which permitted the Loyalist faction to choose between electing delegates in presidential primaries or nominating them at district conventions. He supported former mayor and district attorney Maurice Dantin in the 1975 Mississippi gubernatorial election. He was succeeded by Cliff Finch on January 20, 1976.

== Later political career ==
After leaving gubernatorial office, Waller returned to practicing law in Jackson. Most of his clients were working-class people, and he handled many divorce and personal injury suits. On March 10, 1978, he hosted a press conference in which he criticized Eastland for sharing his intent to seek reelection to the U.S. Senate, saying "I happen to believe a young man with some stamina and vigor is needed." On March 20, Waller officially announced his own campaign for the Senate seat, declaring, "We need a 60 hour a week man in Washington, not a six hour a week man." The following day Eastland withdrew his campaign. Angered by Waller's perceived betrayal, he recruited Dantin to run against him in the Democratic primary. Sullivan and Governor Finch also entered the race. Dantin won the primary while Waller, viewed by many Democrats as ungrateful of Eastland's support for him in 1971, placed fourth. Waller sought the Democratic nomination for governor again in 1987, running on a platform of increased highway construction, program budgeting for state agencies, and the revival of referendums. He finished third in the first primary. He supported Republican Kirk Fordice's gubernatorial reelection campaign in 1995 and Haley Barbour's reelection in 2007. He was opposed to removing the Confederate battle flag canton from the flag of Mississippi.

== Later life and legacy ==
In 2007, Waller released an autobiography, Straight Ahead: Memoirs of a Mississippi Governor. On November 29, 2011, Waller was admitted to the St. Dominic Hospital in Jackson. He died there the following day at the age of 85 and was buried in Jessamine Cemetery in Ridgeland.

Journalist Hodding Carter III believed Waller's time in office was "inconsequential". Historian David Sansing opined that "Waller was elected at a crucial time in the state's history and his constructive leadership helped chart a new direction for Mississippi." Minor wrote that "the greatest value of the Waller years" was in his creation of "harmony between blacks and whites in Mississippi's highly complex society". Journalist Adam Nossiter reflected, "Waller was not too keen on the integrationist goals of the civil rights movement, but Jim Crow disturbed his ideals of justice and fair play. As a prosecutor, and later as the governor, he bulled through old restrictions. He came along at a moment when, because of intensive black voter registration, the politics of his convictions were plausible."

== Works cited ==
- Bass, Jack (1995). The Transformation of Southern Politics: Social Change and Political Consequence Since 1945 (reprint ed.). University of Georgia Press. ISBN 9780820317281.
- Bolton, Charles C. (2013). William F. Winter and the New Mississippi: A Biography. Jackson: University Press of Mississippi. ISBN 978-1-61703-787-0.
- Bullock, Charles S.; Rozell, Mark J., eds. (2010). The New Politics of the Old South: An Introduction to Southern Politics. Rowman & Littlefield. ISBN 9780742570214.
- Busbee, Westley F. Jr. (2014). Mississippi: A History (second ed.). John Wiley & Sons. ISBN 9781118755921.
- Danielson, Chris (2011). After Freedom Summer : How Race Realigned Mississippi Politics, 1965–1986. University of Florida Press. ISBN 9780813037387.
- Krane, Dale; Shaffer, Stephen D. (1992). Mississippi Government and Politics: Modernizers Versus Traditionalists. University of Nebraska Press. ISBN 9780803277588.
- "Mississippi Official and Statistical Register 1972–1976". Official and Statistical Register. Jackson: Mississippi Secretary of State. 1973. OCLC 1131544573.
- Nash, Jere; Taggart, Andy (2009). Mississippi Politics: The Struggle for Power, 1976-2008 (second ed.). University Press of Mississippi. ISBN 9781604733570.
- Nossiter, Adam (1994). Of Long Memory: Mississippi And The Murder Of Medgar Evers. Reading, Massachusetts: Addison-Wesley. ISBN 9780201483390.
- Sansing, David G. (1990). Making Haste Slowly: The Troubled History of Higher Education in Mississippi. University Press of Mississippi. ISBN 9781617035715.
- Sansing, David G. (2016). Mississippi Governors: Soldiers, Statesmen, Scholars, Scoundrels (first ed.). Oxford: Nautilus Publishing Company. ISBN 978-1-936946-81-5.
- Sumners, Cecil L. (1998). The Governors of Mississippi. Pelican Publishing. ISBN 9781455605217.
- Waller, William (2007). Straight Ahead: The Memoirs of a Mississippi Governor. Brandon: Quail Ridge Press. ISBN 978-1-934193-04-4.

Party political offices
Preceded by John Bell Williams	Democratic nominee for Governor of Mississippi; 1971	Succeeded by Cliff Finch
Political offices
Preceded by John Bell Williams	Governor of Mississippi; January 18, 1972–January 20, 1976	Succeeded by Cliff Finch
