= Senator Arrington =

Senator Arrington may refer to:

- Kristen Arrington (born 1975), Florida State Senate
- Richard Olney Arrington (1897–1963), Mississippi State Senate
- W. Russell Arrington (1906–1979), Illinois State Senate
