= Senator Barlow =

Senator Barlow

- Boce W. Barlow Jr. (1915–2005), Connecticut State Senate
- Bradley Barlow (1814–1889), Vermont State Senate
- Frank D. Barlow (1891–1982), Mississippi State Senate
- Haven J. Barlow (born 1922), Utah State Senate
- Stephen Steele Barlow (1818–1900), Wisconsin State Senate
- Thomas Barlow (New York politician) (1805–1896), New York State Senate
