= James M. Coen =

American politician (1849–1934)

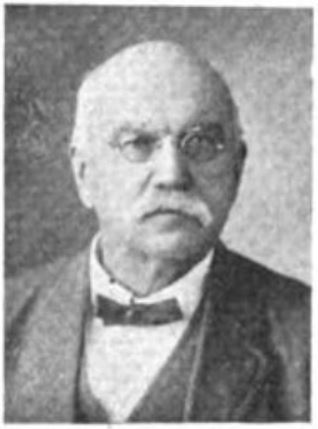
- Coen c. 1916

Member of the Mississippi Senate from the 11th district
- In office January 1916 – January 1920
- Preceded by: Jasper Felix Guynes
- Succeeded by: James Madison Pannell

Personal details
- Born: September 5, 1849 Copiah County, MS
- Died: April 1, 1934 (aged 84) Gallatin, Copiah County, MS
- Party: Democrat
- Children: 3

Military service
- Allegiance: Confederate States
- Branch/service: Army
- Years of service: 1861-1864
- Rank: Private
- Unit: Company G, 24th Mississippi Cavalry Battalion
- Battles/wars: Civil War

James M. Coen (September 5, 1849 – April 1934) was a farmer and a Democratic member of the Mississippi State Senate, representing the state's 11th district, from 1916 to 1920.

== Biography ==
James M. Coen was born on September 5, 1849, in Linden, Copiah County, Mississippi. He was a member of the Confederate Army in the Cavalry during the Civil War until he was paroled by the Mississippi government in 1864. After the war ended, he returned to farming. During Reconstruction, he was a member of the Ku Klux Klan. From 1885 to 1891, he was the Justice of the Peace in his district for three terms. In 1915, he was elected to the Mississippi State Senate to represent the state's 11th District, composed of Copiah County, as a Democrat. He served in the term from 1916 to 1920. He died after a long illness in his son Claude's house in Gallatin, near Hazlehurst, in early April 1934. He was one of the last living Civil War veterans in that county. His funeral service was on April 2, and he was buried on April 3.

== Personal life ==
He was a member of the Methodist Church. He married Carrie M. Segrist in 1881. Coen had three children, Claude C. Coen, Herman Coen, and Flossie (Coen) Wyatt, as well as three stepdaughters.
