= James Madison Pannell =

American politician (1883-1930)

Member of the Mississippi Senate from the 11th district
- In office January 1920 – January 1924
- Preceded by: James M. Coen
- Succeeded by: John Scott Decell

Personal details
- Born: January 31, 1883 Wesson, Mississippi
- Died: December 27, 1930 (aged 47)
- Party: Democrat

James Madison Pannell (January 31, 1883 - December 27, 1930) was a teacher and Democratic Mississippi state senator, representing the state's 11th senatorial district from 1920 to 1924.

== Biography ==
James Madison Pannell was born on January 31, 1883, in Wesson, Mississippi. He was the son of Joseph Crockett Pannell and Florence Laura Amanda (Graves) Pannell. He graduated from the University of Mississippi with a B. S. and became a teacher. In November 1919, he was elected to the Mississippi State Senate as a Democrat to represent the state's 11th district from 1920 to 1924. Pannell died on December 27, 1930.
