= John Scott Decell =

American politician

Member of the Mississippi Senate from the 11th district
- In office January 1924 – January 1928
- Preceded by: James Madison Pannell
- Succeeded by: C. Hooker Miller

Personal details
- Born: March 31, 1850 Copiah County, Mississippi
- Died: July 10, 1931 (aged 81) Hazlehurst, Copiah County, Mississippi
- Party: Democrat

John Scott Decell (March 31, 1850 – July 10, 1931) was a member of the Mississippi Senate, representing the state's 11th senatorial district, from 1924 to 1928.

== Biography ==
John Scott Decell was born on March 31, 1850, in Copiah County, Mississippi. At one point, he was the sheriff of Copiah County. In 1924, he became a member of the Mississippi Senate, representing the 11th district, which was composed of Copiah County, from 1924 to 1928. He died in Hazlehurst, Mississippi, on July 10, 1931.
