= Charles Evers =

American civil rights activist (1922–2020)

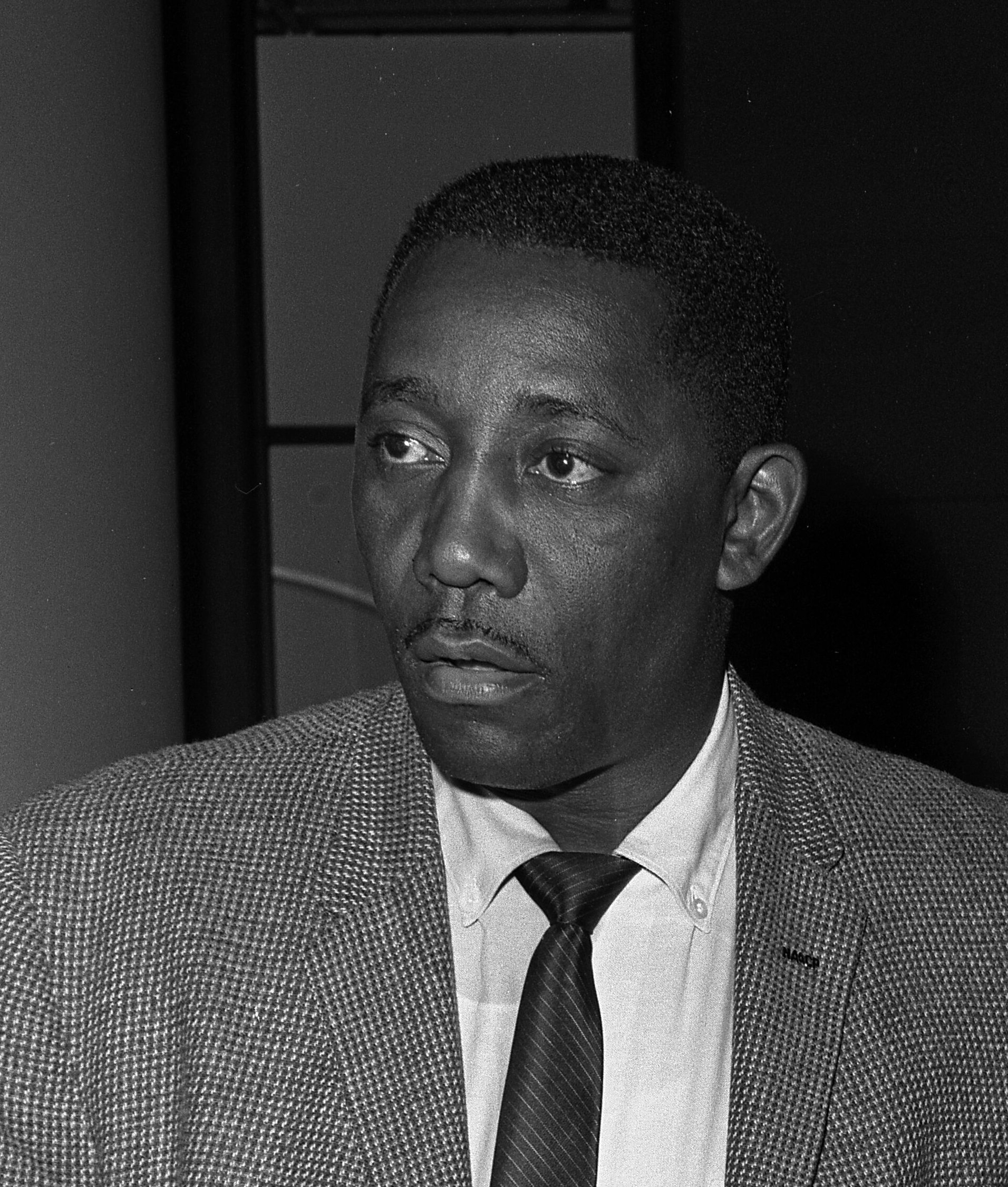
- Evers in 1964

Mayor of Fayette
- In office 1985–1989
- Preceded by: Kennie Middleton
- Succeeded by: Kennie Middleton
- In office 1969–1981
- Preceded by: R. J. Allen
- Succeeded by: Kennie Middleton

Personal details
- Born: James Charles Evers; September 11, 1922 Decatur, Mississippi, U.S.
- Died: July 22, 2020 (aged 97) Brandon, Mississippi, U.S.
- Party: Democratic (before 1969); Independent (1969–1978); Republican (1978–2020)
- Spouse(s): Christine Evers (annulled) Nannie Magee (m. 1951; div. 1974)
- Relations: Medgar Evers (brother); Myrlie Evers-Williams (sister-in-law)
- Children: 4
- Education: Alcorn State University (BA)

Military service
- Allegiance: United States
- Branch/service: United States Army
- Battles/wars: World War II

James Charles Evers (September 11, 1922 – July 22, 2020) was an American civil rights activist, businessman, radio personality, and politician. Evers was known for his role in the civil rights movement along with his younger brother Medgar Evers. After serving in World War II, Evers began his career as a disc jockey at WHOC in Philadelphia, Mississippi. In 1954, he was made the National Association for the Advancement of Colored People (NAACP) State Voter Registration chairman. After his brother's assassination in 1963, Evers took over his position as field director of the NAACP in Mississippi. In this role, he organized and led many demonstrations for the rights of African Americans.

In 1969, Evers was named "Man of the Year" by the NAACP. On June 3, 1969, Evers was elected in Fayette, Mississippi, as the first African-American mayor of a biracial town in Mississippi since the Reconstruction era, following passage of the Voting Rights Act of 1965 which enforced constitutional rights for citizens.

At the time of Evers's election as mayor, the town of Fayette had a population of 1,600 of which 75% was African-American and almost 25% white; the white officers on the Fayette city police "resigned rather than work under a black administration," according to the Associated Press. Evers told reporters "I guess we will just have to operate with an all-black police department for the present. But I am still looking for some whites to join us in helping Fayette grow." Evers then outlawed the carrying of firearms within city limits.

He ran for governor in 1971 and the United States Senate in 1978, both times as an independent candidate. In 1989, Evers was defeated for re-election after serving sixteen years as mayor. In his later life, he became a Republican, endorsing Ronald Reagan in 1980, and more recently Donald Trump in 2016. This diversity in party affiliations throughout his life was reflected in his fostering of friendships with people from a variety of backgrounds, as well as his advising of politicians from across the political spectrum. After his political career ended, he returned to radio and hosted his own show, Let's Talk. In 2017, Evers was inducted into the National Rhythm & Blues Hall of Fame for his contributions to the music industry.

== Early life and education ==
Charles Evers was born in Decatur, Mississippi, on September 11, 1922, to James Evers, a laborer, and Jesse Wright Evers, a maid. He was the eldest of four children; Medgar Evers was his younger brother. He attended segregated public schools, which were typically underfunded in Mississippi following the exclusion of African Americans from the political system by disenfranchisement after 1890. Evers graduated from Alcorn State University in Lorman, Mississippi.

== Career ==
=== Business activities ===
During World War II, Charles and Medgar Evers both served in the United States Army. Charles fell in love with a Philippine woman while stationed overseas. He could not marry her and bring her home to Mississippi because the state's constitution prohibited interracial marriages.

During the war he established a brothel in Quezon City which catered to American servicemen. After serving a year of reserve duty following the Korean War, he settled in Philadelphia, Mississippi. In 1949, he began working as a disc jockey at WHOC, making him the first black disc jockey in the state. By the early 1950s, he was managing a hotel, cab company, and burial insurance business in the town. He had a cafe in Philadelphia and influenced over two hundred black citizens to pay their poll tax. Forced to leave due to local white hostility in 1956, he moved to Chicago. Low on money, he began working as a meatpacker in stockyards during the day and as an attendant for the men's restroom at the Conrad Hilton Hotel at nights. He also began pimping and ran a numbers game, taking $500 a week from the latter. He gained enough money to purchase several bars, bootlegged liquor, and sold jukeboxes.

=== Civil rights activism ===
In Mississippi about 1951, brothers Charles and Medgar Evers grew interested in African freedom movements. They were interested in Jomo Kenyatta and the rise of the Kikuyu tribal resistance to colonialism in Kenya, known as the Mau Mau uprising as it moved to open violence. Along with his brother, Charles became active in the Regional Council of Negro Leadership (RCNL), a civil rights organization that promoted self-help and business ownership. He also helped his brother with black voter registration drives. Between 1952 and 1955, Evers often spoke at the RCNL's annual conferences in Mound Bayou, a town founded by freedmen, on such issues as voting rights. His brother Medgar continued to be involved in civil rights, becoming field secretary and head of the National Association for the Advancement of Colored People (NAACP) in Mississippi. While working in Chicago he sent money to him, not specifying the source.

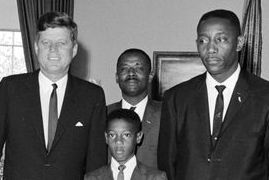
Evers (far right) with President John F. Kennedy, June 1963

On June 12, 1963, Byron De La Beckwith, a member of a Ku Klux Klan chapter, fatally shot Evers's brother, Medgar, in Mississippi as he arrived home from work. Medgar died at the hospital in Jackson. Charles learned of his brother's death several hours later and flew to Jackson the following morning. Deeply upset by the assassination, he heavily involved himself in the planning of his brother's funeral. He decided to relocate to Mississippi to carry on his brother's work. Journalist Jason Berry, who later worked for Charles, said, "I think he wanted to be a better person. I think Medgar's death was a cathartic experience." A decade after his death, Evers and blues musician B.B. King created the Medgar Evers Homecoming Festival, an annual three-day event held the first week of June in Mississippi.

Over the opposition of more establishment figures in the National Association for the Advancement of Colored People (NAACP) such as Roy Wilkins, Evers took over his brother's post as head of the NAACP in Mississippi. Wilkins never managed a friendly relationship with Evers, and Medgar's widow, Myrlie, also disapproved of Charles' replacing him. A staunch believer in racial integration, he distrusted what he viewed as the militancy and separatism of the Student Nonviolent Coordinating Committee and the Mississippi Freedom Democratic Party, a black-dominated breakaway of the segregationist Mississippi Democratic Party. In 1965 he launched a series of successful black boycotts in southwestern Mississippi which partnered with the Natchez Deacons for Defense and Justice, which won concessions from the Natchez authorities and ratified his unconventional boycott methods. Often accompanied by a group of 65 male followers, he would pressure local blacks in small towns to avoid stores under boycott and directly challenge white business leaders. He also led a voter registration campaign. He coordinated his efforts from the small town of Fayette in Jefferson County. Fayette was a small, economically depressed town of about 2,500 people. About three-fourths of the population was black, and they had long been socially and economically subordinate to the white minority. Evers moved the NAACP's Mississippi field office from Jackson to Fayette to take advantage of the potential of the black majority and achieve political influence in Jefferson and two adjacent counties. He explained, "My feeling is that Negroes gotta control somewhere in America, and we've dropped anchor in these counties. We are going to control these three counties in the next ten years. There is no question about it."

With his voter registration drives having made Fayette's number of black registered voters double the size of the white electorate, Evers helped elect a black man to the local school board in 1966. He also established the Medgar Evers Community Center at the outskirts of town, which served as a center for registration efforts, grocery store, restaurant, and dance hall. By early 1968 he had established a network of local NAACP branches in the region. The president of each branch served as Evers' deputies, and he attended all of their meetings. That year he made a bid for the open seat of the 3rd congressional district in the U.S. House of Representatives, facing six white opponents in the Democratic primary. Though low on funds, he led in the primary with a plurality of the votes. The Mississippi Legislature responded by passing a law mandating a runoff primary in the event of no absolute majority in the initial contest, which Evers lost. He also supported Robert F. Kennedy's 1968 presidential campaign, serving as co-director of his Mississippi campaign organization, and was with Kennedy in Los Angeles when he was assassinated.

=== Mayor of Fayette ===
In May 1969, Evers ran for the office of Mayor of Fayette and defeated white incumbent R. J. Allen, 386 votes to 255. This made him the first black mayor of a biracial Mississippi town (unlike the all-black Mound Bayou (Note: The town of Mound Bayou had been incorporated in 1898 as a Negro-only municipality and had had black mayors and council members throughout the 20th century.)) since Reconstruction. Evers' election as mayor had great symbolic significance statewide and attracted national attention. The NAACP named Evers their 1969 Man of the Year. Evers popularized the slogan, "Hands that picked cotton can now pick the mayor." The local white community was bitter about his victory, but he became intensively popular among Mississippi's blacks. To celebrate his victory, he hosted an inaugural ball in Natchez, which was widely attended by black Mississippians, reporters from around the country, and prominent national liberals including Ramsey Clark, Ted Sorensen, Whitney Young, Julian Bond, Shirley MacLaine, and Paul O'Dwyer. The white-dominated school board refused to let Evers swear-in on property under their jurisdiction, so he took his oath of office in a parking lot.

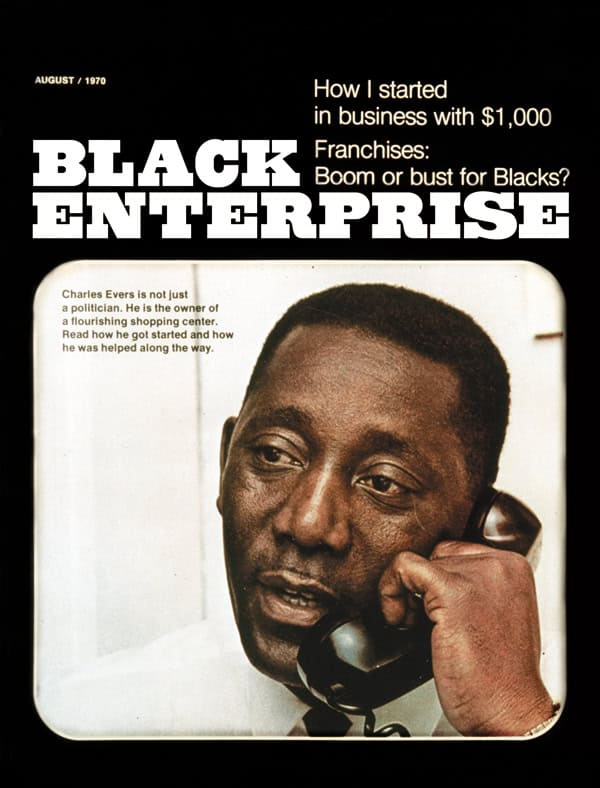
Evers on the cover of the first issue of Black Enterprise (1970)

Evers appointed a black police force and several black staff members. He also benefitted from an influx of young, white liberal volunteers who wanted to assist a civil rights leader. Many ended up leaving after growing disillusioned with Evers' pursuit of personal financial success and domineering leadership style. Evers sought to make Fayette an upstanding community and a symbolic refuge for black people. Repulsed by the behavior of poor blacks in the town, he ordered the police force to enforce a 25-mile per hour speed limit on local roads, banned cursing in public, and cracked down on truancy. He also prohibited the carrying of firearms in town but kept a gun on himself. He quickly responded to concerns from poor blacks while making white businessmen wait outside of his office. Rhetorically, he would vacillate between messages of racial conciliation and statements of hostility.

Fayette's white population remained bitter about Evers' victory. Many avoided the city hall where they used to socialize and The Fayette Chronicle regularly criticized him. He argued with the county board of supervisors over his plan to erect busts of his brother, Martin Luther King Jr., and the Kennedys on the courthouse square. He told the press, "They're cooperating because they haven't blown my head off. This is Mississippi." In September 1969, a Klansman drove into Fayette with a collection of weapons, intending to assassinate Evers. A white resident tipped off the mayor and the Klansman was arrested. The Klansman defended his motives by saying, "I am a Mississippi white man".

Evers' moralistic style began to create discontent; in early 1970, most of Fayette's police department resigned, saying the mayor had treated them "like dogs". Evers complained that local blacks were "jealous" of him. As the judge in the municipal court, he personally issued fines for infractions such as cursing in public. He regularly ignored the input of the town board of aldermen, and town employee Charles Ramberg reported that he said he would fire municipal workers who would not vote for him. During Evers' tenure, Fayette benefitted from several federal grants, and ITT Inc. built an assembly plant in the town, but the region's economy largely remained depressed. By 1981, Jefferson County had the highest unemployment rate in the state.

Whites' perception that Evers was venal and self-interested persisted and began to spread among the black community. This problem ballooned when in 1974 the Internal Revenue Service arranged for him to be indicted for tax evasion by failing to report $156,000 in income he garnered in the late 1960s. Prosecutors further accused him of depositing town funds in a personal bank account. His attorney told the court that Evers had indeed concealed the income, but argued that the charge was invalid since this had been done before the late 1960s, as the indictment specified. The case resulted in a mistrial, but Evers' reputation permanently suffered. In the late 1970s he used a $5,300 federal grant to renovate a building he owned which he leased to a federal day care program, and used some of the employees for personal business.

Evers served many terms as mayor of Fayette. Admired by some, he alienated others with his inflexible stands on various issues. Evers did not like to share or delegate power. Evers lost the Democratic primary for mayor in 1981 to Kennie Middleton. Four years later, Evers defeated Middleton in the primaries and won back the office of mayor. In 1989, Evers lost the nomination once again to political rival Kennie Middleton. In his response to the defeat, Evers accepted, said he was tired, and that: "Twenty years is enough. I'm tired of being out front. Let someone else be out front."

=== 1971 gubernatorial campaign ===
Evers began mulling the possibility of a campaign for the office of governor in 1969. He decided to enter the 1971 gubernatorial election as an independent, kicking off his campaign with a rally in Decatur. He later explained his reason for launching the bid, saying, "I ran for governor because if someone doesn't start running, there will never be a black man or a black woman governor of the state of Mississippi." He endorsed white segregationist Jimmy Swan in the Democratic primary, reasoning that if Swan won the nomination, moderate whites would be more inclined to vote for himself in the general election. He campaigned on a platform of reduced taxes—particularly for lower property taxes on the elderly, improved healthcare, and legalizing gambling along the Gulf Coast. Low on money, his candidacy was largely funded by the sale of campaign buttons and copies of his recently published autobiography. His campaign staff was largely young and inexperienced and lacked organization.

Evers' rallies drew large crowds of blacks. The Clarion-Ledger, a leading Mississippian conservative newspaper, largely ignored his campaign. To gain attention, he unexpectedly gatecrashed the annual Fisherman's Rodeo in Pascagoula and stopped and spoke to people on the streets of Jackson during their morning commute. Police departments in rural towns were often horrified by the arrival of his campaign caravan. A total of 269 other black candidates were running for office in Mississippi that year, and many of them complained that Evers was self-absorbed and hoarding resources, despite his slim chances of winning. Evers did little to support them.

In the general election, Evers faced Democratic nominee Bill Waller and independent segregationist Thomas Pickens Brady. Waller and Evers were personally acquainted with one another, as Waller had prosecuted Beckwith for the murder of Medgar. Despite the fears of public observers, the campaign was largely devoid of overt racist appeals and Evers and Waller avoided negative tactics. Though about 40 percent of the Mississippi electorate in 1971 was black, Evers only secured about 22 percent of the total vote; Waller won with 601,222 votes to Evers' 172,762 and Brady's 6,653. The night of the election, Evers shook the hands of Waller supporters in Jackson and then went to a local television station where his opponent was delivering a victory speech. Learning that Evers had arrived, Waller's nervous aides hurried the governor-elect to his car. Evers approached the car shortly before its departure and told Waller, "I just wanted to congratulate you." Waller replied, "Whaddya say, Charlie?" and his wife leaned over and shook Evers' hand.

=== Later political career ===
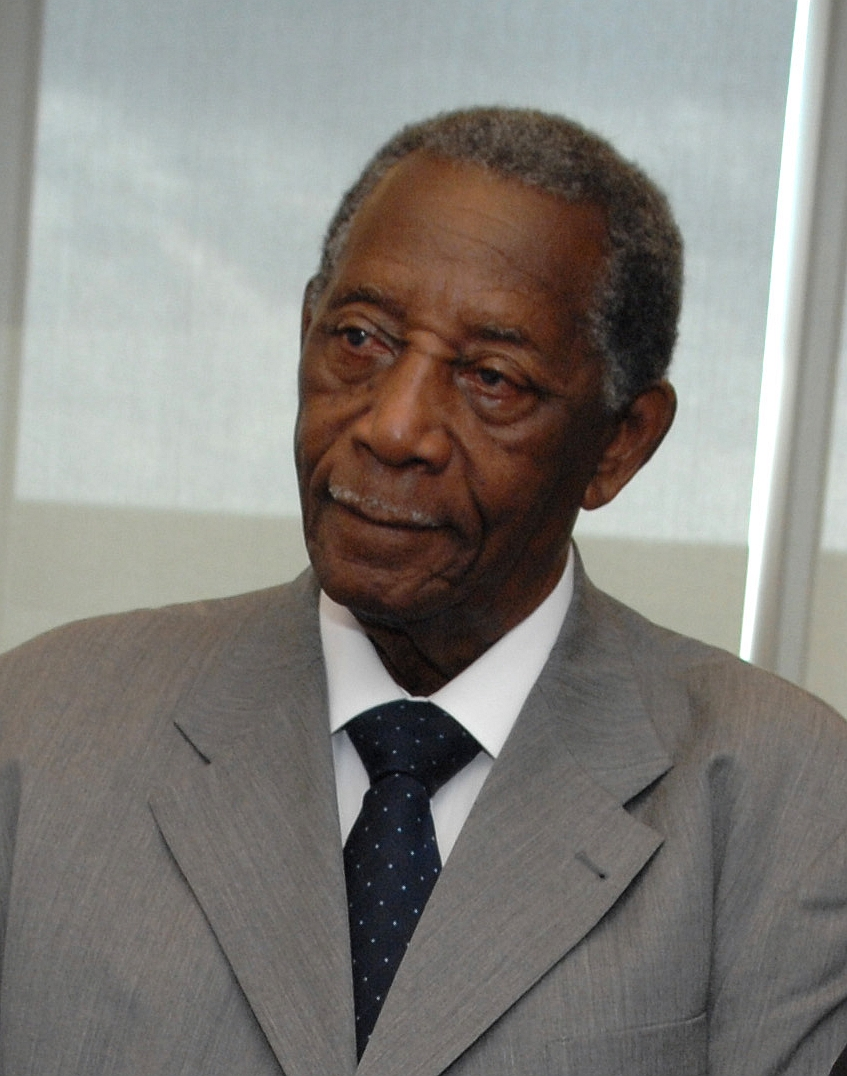
Evers in 2009

In 1978, Evers ran as an independent for the U.S. Senate seat vacated by Democrat James Eastland. He finished in third place behind his opponents, Democrat Maurice Dantin and Republican Thad Cochran. He received 24 percent of the vote, likely siphoning off African-American votes that would have otherwise gone to Dantin. Cochran won the election with a plurality of 45 percent of the vote. With the shift in white voters moving into the Republican Party in the state (and the rest of the South), Cochran was continuously re-elected to his Senate seat. After his failed Senate race, Evers briefly switched political parties and became a Republican.

In 1983, Evers ran as an independent for governor of Mississippi but lost to the Democrat Bill Allain. Republican Leon Bramlett of Clarksdale, also known as a college All-American football player, finished second with 39 percent of the vote.

Evers endorsed Ronald Reagan for President of the United States during the 1980 United States presidential election. Evers later attracted controversy for his support of judicial nominee Charles W. Pickering, a Republican, who was nominated by President George H. W. Bush for a seat on the U.S. Court of Appeals. Evers criticized the NAACP and other organizations for opposing Pickering, as he said the candidate had a record of supporting the civil rights movement in Mississippi.

Evers befriended a range of people from sharecroppers to presidents. He was an informal adviser to politicians as diverse as Lyndon B. Johnson, George C. Wallace, Ronald Reagan and Robert F. Kennedy. Evers severely criticized such national leaders as Roy Wilkins, Stokely Carmichael, H. Rap Brown and Louis Farrakhan over various issues.

Evers was a member of the Republican Party for 30 years when he spoke warmly of the 2008 election of Barack Obama as the first black President of the United States. During the 2016 presidential election, Evers supported Donald Trump's presidential campaign.

=== Books ===
Evers wrote two autobiographies or memoirs: Evers (1971), written with Grace Halsell and self-published; and Have No Fear, written with Andrew Szanton and published by John Wiley & Sons (1997).

== Personal life ==
Evers was briefly married to Christine Evers until their marriage ended in annulment. In 1951, Evers married Nannie L. Magee, with whom he had four daughters. The couple divorced in June 1974. Evers lived in Brandon, Mississippi, and served as station manager of WMPR 90.1 FM in Jackson.

On July 22, 2020, Evers died in Brandon at age 97.

== Media portrayal ==
Evers was portrayed by Bill Cobbs in the 1996 film Ghosts of Mississippi (1996).

== Honors ==
- 1969: Evers was named "Man of the Year" by the NAACP.
- 2012: Evers was honored with a marker on the Mississippi Blues Trail in Fayette.
- 2025: Evers was honored with a Freedom Trail Marker in Fayette.

== See also ==
- List of civil rights leaders
- List of African-American United States Senate candidates
- List of first African-American mayors

== Works cited ==
- Busbee, Westley F. Jr. (2014). Mississippi: A History (second ed.). John Wiley & Sons. ISBN 9781118755921.
- Nossiter, Adam (1994). Of Long Memory: Mississippi And The Murder Of Medgar Evers. Reading, Massachusetts: Addison-Wesley. ISBN 9780201483390.
- Sansing, David G. (2016). Mississippi Governors: Soldiers, Statesmen, Scholars, Scoundrels (first ed.). Oxford: Nautilus Publishing Company. ISBN 978-1-936946-81-5.
- Sumners, Cecil L. (1998). The Governors of Mississippi. Pelican Publishing. ISBN 9781455605217.
