= 1978 United States Senate election in Mississippi =

- November 7, 1978
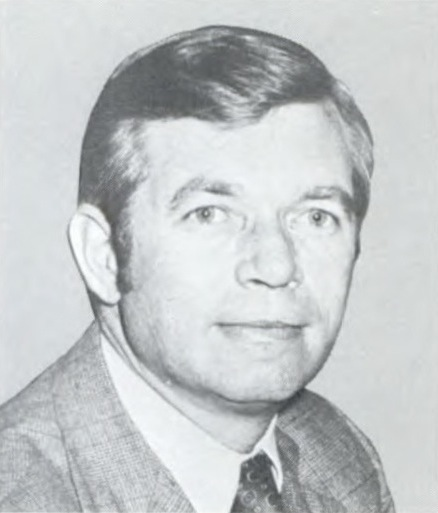

Nominee	Thad Cochran	Maurice Dantin	Charles Evers
Party	Republican	Democratic	Independent
Popular vote	267,302	187,541	133,646
Percentage	45.29%	31.77%	22.64%
- Cochran: 30–40% 40–50% 50–60% 60–70% Dantin: 30–40% 40–50% 50–60% 60–70% 70–80% Evers: 30–40% 40–50% 50–60% 60–70% 70–80%
U.S. senator before election
James Eastland
Democratic
Elected U.S. Senator
Thad Cochran
Republican

The 1978 United States Senate election in Mississippi was held on November 7, 1978. Incumbent Democratic U.S. Senator James Eastland decided to retire.

Republican Thad Cochran won the open seat, becoming the first Republican to win a U.S. Senate election in Mississippi since the end of Reconstruction in 1881. It was also the first time since 1877 that a Republican won this Senate seat.

== Democratic primary ==
=== Candidates ===
- Maurice Dantin, former District Attorney
- Cliff Finch, Governor of Mississippi
- Robert L. Robinson
- Charles L. Sullivan, former Lieutenant Governor of Mississippi
- Richard C. Tedford
- Bill Waller, former Governor of Mississippi
- Helen M. Williams

=== Results ===
Democratic primary results
Party	Candidate	Votes	%
Democratic	Maurice Dantin	102,968	29.01%
Democratic	Cliff Finch	98,751	27.83%
Democratic	Charles L. Sullivan	78,702	22.18%
Democratic	William L. Waller	74,465	20.98%
Democratic	Robert L. Robinson	15,879	4.20%
Democratic	Richard C. Tedford	4,201	1.11%
Democratic	Helen M. Williams	2,937	0.78%
Total votes		377,903	100.00%

==== Runoff results ====
Democratic primary runoff results
Party	Candidate	Votes	%
Democratic	Maurice Dantin	235,904	65.35%
Democratic	Cliff Finch	125,109	34.66%
Total votes		361,013	100%

== Republican primary ==
=== Candidates ===
- Thad Cochran, U.S. Representative from Jackson
- Charles W. Pickering, Chairman of the Mississippi Republican Party

=== Results ===
Republican primary results
Party	Candidate	Votes	%
Republican	Thad Cochran	50,857	68.97%
Republican	Charles W. Pickering	22,880	31.03%
Total votes		73,737	100%

== General election ==
=== Candidates ===
- Thad Cochran, U.S. Representative from Jackson (Republican)
- Maurice Dantin, former District Attorney (Democratic)
- Charles Evers, Mayor of Fayette (independent)
- Henry Jay Kirksey, civil rights activist and candidate for governor in 1975 (independent)

=== Campaign ===
Evers was the first African American elected since the Reconstruction era to be mayor in any Mississippi city, in 1969. He ran as an independent, and as a result his campaign divided the Democrats and allowed Cochran to win the Senate seat with a 45 percent plurality. This made Cochran the first Republican in a century to win a statewide election (other than a presidential election) in Mississippi. Eastland resigned on December 27, 1978, to give Cochran a seniority advantage over new incoming senators.

=== Results ===
Mississippi U.S. Senate Election, 1978
Party	Candidate	Votes	%
Republican	Thad Cochran	267,302	45.29%
Democratic	Maurice Dantin	187,541	31.77%
Independent	Charles Evers	133,646	22.64%
Independent	Henry Jay Kirksey	1,747	0.30%
Republican gain from Democratic			

== See also ==
- 1978 United States Senate elections

== Works cited ==
- Moreland, Laurence; Steed, Robert; Baker, Tod, eds. (1991). The 1988 Presidential Election in the South: Continuity Amidst Change in Southern Party Politics. Praeger Publishers. ISBN 0275931455.
