= C. Hooker Miller =

American politician

Member of the Mississippi Senate from the 11th district
- In office January 1928 – January 1932
- Preceded by: John Scott Decell
- Succeeded by: R. O. Arrington

Member of the Mississippi House of Representatives from the Copiah County district
- In office January 1920 – January 1924

Personal details
- Born: June 13, 1888 Gallman, Mississippi
- Died: 1968 (aged 79–80)
- Party: Democrat

Charles Hooker Miller (June 13, 1888 - 1968) was a Democratic Mississippi state legislator from Copiah County in the 1920s and the 1930s.

== Biography ==
Charles Hooker Miller was born on June 13, 1888, in Gallman, Mississippi. He represented Copiah County as a Democrat in the Mississippi House of Representatives from 1920 to 1924. He then represented Mississippi's 11th senatorial district in the Mississippi Senate from 1928 to 1932. Miller died in 1968.
