= Thomas Pickens Brady =

American judge

Thomas Pickens Brady (August 6, 1903 – January 31, 1973) was a Mississippi jurist and a segregationist leader during the Civil Rights Era, who lived in Brookhaven, Mississippi. He advocated for segregation as a way of life and means to ensure peace.

== Education ==
Born in New Orleans, in the Touro Infirmary, because no nursing center existed in Brookhaven, Brady graduated from Brookhaven High School in 1920 and then went to the Lawrenceville School (Class of 1923) and then to Yale University (Class of 1927).

The next year Brady went to the University of Michigan Law School, then to the University of Mississippi, where he completed his law studies and also was instructor there. Parallel to this, he was a member of the Society of Science.

== Legal career ==
Upon graduating from law school on 1930, Brady joined his father's firm, Brady, Dean and Hobbs.

In July 1963, he was appointed an associate justice of the Mississippi Supreme Court to complete the unexpired term of Justice R. Olney Arrington. He served until his death. While there, in spite of his personal segregationist views, he ruled in 1965 a White-only park in Greenwood was to be integrated, and vacated one year later the conviction of a Black by an All-White grand jury.

== Political activism ==
In an interview, Brady affirmed his passion for politics came on 1932, when he heard Paul B. Johnson Sr. and Martin Sennet Conner in Brookhaven.

That year he attended his first Democratic National Convention in Chicago; followed by the DNC in Chicago in 1936, the 1948 event in Philadelphia, during which he was the Chairman of the Speakers Bureau for the Dixiecrats, and the 1960 one in Atlantic City. He served as a Democratic National Committeeman from 1960 to 1964, on the urging of Ross Barnett and State Executive Committee members who wanted an anti-Civil Rights delegate to the Convention, and who thereafter refused to sign any loyalty pledge, describing this obligation as "smack[ing] of totalitarianism".

Brady rose to national prominence through his strident discourse against civil rights and integration. On October 28, 1954, while a Mississippi Circuit Court Judge he delivered an address entitled 'Black Monday' to the Sons of the American Revolution in Greenwood, Mississippi, which he later published in an eponymously-titled book. He later gave the copyrights to the Citizens' Council, earning them enough funds to operate.

On October 22, 1965, Time magazine said Brady "Not long ago ... was worst known as the philosopher of Mississippi's racist white Citizens' Councils", then mentioning he'd reversed the convictions of two Negro girls who tried to use an already integrated Greenville park.

He later affirmed he was offered three times since 1925 to join the Ku Klux Klan but always refused.

Brady ran as an independent on a segregationist platform in the 1971 Mississippi gubernatorial election against Democrat Bill Waller and independent Charles Evers. He placed last with only 6,653 votes.

== Political and racial views ==
Brady was a white supremacist: in Black Monday Brady opined on the sanctity of Southern white women ("[t]he loveliest and the purest of God's creatures, the nearest thing to an angelic being that treads this terrestrial ball is a well-bred, cultured Southern white woman or her blue-eyed, golden-haired little girl") and the bestiality of Blacks:

You can dress a chimpanzee, housebreak him, and teach him to use a knife and fork, but it will take countless generations of evolutionary development, if ever, before you can convince him that a caterpillar or a cockroach is not a delicacy. Likewise the social, political, economical, and religious preferences of the negro remain close to the caterpillar and the cockroach. This is not stated to ridicule or abuse the negro. There is nothing fundamentally wrong with the caterpillar or the cockroach. It is merely a matter of taste. A cockroach or caterpillar remains proper food for a chimpanzee.

He later advocated the abolition of the National Association for the Advancement of Colored People, disbanding the public schools in order to sidestep rulings requiring integration, wanted an elected SCOTUS and the creation of a forty-ninth state for African Americans.

== Death ==
Brady died on January 31, 1973, after undergoing heart surgery in Houston.

== Works cited ==
- Busbee, Westley F. Jr. (2014). Mississippi: A History (second ed.). John Wiley & Sons. ISBN 9781118755921.
- Sumners, Cecil L. (1998). The Governors of Mississippi. Pelican Publishing. ISBN 9781455605217.

Political offices
Preceded by Richard Olney Arrington	Justice of the Supreme Court of Mississippi; 1963–1973	Succeeded by Vernon H. Broom
