= Michael D. Sullivan (judge) =

American judge (1938–2000)

Michael David Sullivan (December 2, 1938 – February 27, 2000) was a justice of the Supreme Court of Mississippi from 1984 until his death in 2000. Sullivan was appointed by Mississippi governor Bill Allain in 1984 and reelected. From 1975 until his Supreme Court appointment he was a chancery court judge.

Born in Hattiesburg, Mississippi, Sullivan received a B.A. from the University of Southern Mississippi, followed by a J.D. from Tulane University, "and a master of law in judicial process from the University of Virginia". In 1960, he enlisted in the United States Navy, where he remained until 1963, stationed on the USS Mitscher.

Sullivan was serving as a chancery judge for the tenth district of Mississippi when he was named to the state supreme court on February 16, 1984.

Sullivan married Nancy Ezelle Sullivan, with whom he had two children, David Paul and Rachel Michel. They divorced, and then he married Catherine Carter Sullivan, with whom he had two children, Margaret Elizabeth and Sarah Catherine. A portrait of him by Bill Wilson was commissioned for the Mississippi Supreme Court. Sullivan ran unopposed for reelection to the seat in the November 1984 election.

Sullivan died from lung cancer at his home in Jackson, Mississippi, at the age of 61.

Political offices
Preceded by Vernon H. Broom	Justice of the Supreme Court of Mississippi; 1984–2000	Succeeded by Oliver E. Diaz Jr.
