= Luther E. Grice =

American attorney and politician

Member of the Mississippi Senate from the 11th district
- In office January 1940 – January 1944
- Preceded by: Richard Olney Arrington
- Succeeded by: Frank D. Barlow

Personal details
- Born: June 23, 1881 Lawrence County, MS
- Died: June 4, 1953 (aged 71) Crystal Springs, Mississippi
- Party: Democrat

Luther Etherton Grice (June 23, 1881 - June 4, 1953) was an attorney and a Democratic member of the Mississippi Senate, representing the state's 11th senatorial district from 1940 to 1944.

== Biography ==
Luther Etherton Grice was born on June 23, 1881, in Lawrence County, Mississippi. He graduated from Millsaps College. He practiced law in Crystal Springs for 26 years. He was a member of the Mississippi Senate, representing the state's 11th senatorial district (Copiah County) as a Democrat, from 1940 to 1944. He died on June 4, 1953, in Crystal Springs, Mississippi.
