= Seelig Wise =

American politician (1913–2004)

Member of the Mississippi Senate from the 11th district
- In office January 1964 – January 1968
- Preceded by: Frank D. Barlow

Personal details
- Born: August 7, 1913 Jonestown, Mississippi, U.S.
- Died: September 4, 2004 (aged 91) Jackson, Mississippi, U.S.
- Party: Republican
- Nickname: Bushie

Military service
- Allegiance: United States
- Branch/service: Army
- Rank: Captain

Seelig Bartell "Bushie" Wise (August 7, 1913 – September 4, 2004) was a Republican member of the Mississippi State Senate, representing the 11th district (Coahoma County), from 1964 to 1968. He was the first Republican Mississippi state senator since Reconstruction.

== Biography ==
Seelig Bartell Wise was born on August 7, 1913, in Jonestown, Mississippi. He received a B. S. degree in agriculture from Mississippi State University. He then became a cotton farmer in Coahoma County. He became a Captain in the U. S. Army. In 1964, he became the first Republican Mississippi state senator since Reconstruction when he was elected to represent the state's 11th senatorial district, which consisted of Coahoma County. He died on September 4, 2004, in Jackson, Mississippi.
