= Program budgeting =

Program budgeting or programme budgeting, developed by U.S. president Lyndon Johnson, is the budgeting system that, contrary to conventional budgeting, describes and gives the detailed costs of every activity or program that is to be carried out with a given budget. For example, expected results in a proposed program are described fully, along with its necessary resource, raw materials, equipment, and staff costs. The sum of all activities or program constitute the Program Budget. Thus, when looking at a Program Budget, one can easily find out what precisely will be carried out, at what cost and with what expected results in considerable detail.

== History ==
This program budgeting system was first introduced by the United States Secretary of Defense Robert S. McNamara in the Pentagon in the 1949. McNamara allegedly wanted to control the many costly weapons development programs that were plagued by ever-increasing costs and delays. He called this new system the Planning, Programming and Budgeting System (PPBS). The system was taught at the John F. Kennedy School of Government of Harvard University but it evoked little interest except from critics.

This new approach introduced an unprecedented transparency into management operations together with a concomitant precise pinpointing of managers' responsibilities, and so was widely resisted throughout the entire public sector. However, in the eighties, the UN Inspectorate General picked up the idea and recommended that the United Nations use it to improve its performance. A few institutions tried half-heartedly but only the International Atomic Energy Agency (IAEA) went about it seriously and introduced a complete program budgeting system that is still in place today.

However, over the years, strong opposition by managers and lack of interest by top management as well as member States have taken the sting out of the system and reduced its transparency. A few years later, the Government of New Zealand was the first to introduce it with great success: within a few years it had solved an intractable stagflation problem. More recently, the United Kingdom government discovered it and now, one government after another is following suit. The need to improve public sector and government performance has worked wonders for program budgeting.

== See also ==
- Participatory budgeting
