= Frank D. Barlow =

American politician

Member of the Mississippi Senate from the 11th district
- In office January 1944 – January 1960
- Preceded by: Luther E. Grice
- Succeeded by: S. B. Wise

Personal details
- Born: October 4, 1891 Copiah County, MS
- Died: June 12, 1982 (aged 90) Hazlehurst, Mississippi
- Party: Democrat

Frank Downer Barlow (October 4, 1891 – June 12, 1982) was a Democratic Mississippi state senator, representing the state's 11th senatorial district from 1944 to 1960.

== Biography ==
Frank Downer Barlow was born on October 4, 1891, in Barlow, Copiah County, Mississippi. He was a cattleman. He first became a member of the Mississippi Senate, representing the 11th senatorial district (Copiah County) as a Democrat, in 1944 for the 1944–1948 term. He was re-elected for the next three terms, serving four terms in total, from 1944 to 1960. He died on June 12, 1982, in the Hardy Wilson Memorial Hospital in Hazlehurst, Mississippi.
