= The Southern State of Mind =

The Southern State of Mind is a 1999 non-fiction essay collection edited by Jan Nordby Gretlund, published by University of South Carolina Press.

== Contents ==
It has a total of sixteen essays. They are divided into four parts: "The Biracial South," "The Changing State of Mind," "Reconstructing Southern Identity," and one more section, "Looking South and Back."

Charles Reagan Wilson wrote "The Myth of the Biracial South," which discusses contradictory definitions of the word "biracial" from different individuals.

Tony Badger wrote an essay on how there is little cooperation between white and black people in the political sphere and that left-leaning white people working in politics are "much too intimidated."

Paul M. Gaston wrote an article on the distortion of the public image of Martin Luther King that downplayed the ferocity in his politics when he was alive.

Helen Oakley of the University of Nottingham stated that the essays demonstrate a decrease in "optimism" towards Black-White relationships.

The final essay by C. Vann Woodward discusses his observation of a resurgence in racial segregation.

== Reception ==
Julie Armstrong of Valdosta State University stated that the work "holds together well" but would have been improved with "More diversity" in topics covered and the types of authors. She added that at times the essays show candor in the state of race relations but the essays about Southern literature are "biased towards white writers."

Gaines M. Foster of Louisiana State University praised the "thoughtful discussions of the state of the southern mind and race relations".

Oakley described the book as a "valuable reference point".

Bertram Wyatt-Brown of the University of Florida wrote that the book "presents an uncompromisingly realistic look" at the trajectory of Black-White relationships in the Southern United States at the time of publication.
