= Maurice Dantin =

American attorney (1929–2012)

Personal details
- Born: J. Maurice Dantin; December 13, 1929 Columbia, Mississippi, US
- Died: January 10, 2012 (aged 83) Columbia, Mississippi, US
- Party: Democratic
- Spouse: Patty Dantin
- Children: 4, including Forest Dantin
- Education: University of Mississippi (BA); University of Mississippi School of Law (LLB)

J. Maurice Dantin (December 13, 1929 – January 10, 2012) was an American attorney and politician.

== Early life ==
Dantin attended Columbia High School and played on the school's football team. He enrolled at the University of Mississippi in 1948 and graduated three years later with a Bachelor of Arts degree. In September 1951 he joined the United States Marine Corps after completing the Officer Candidates Course. He served with the recon company of the 2nd Marine Division from February 1952 until April 1953 before later serving with VMA-124 and VMA-143 as an intelligence officer. In 1953 he enrolled at the University of Mississippi Law School and secured a Bachelor of Laws degree. Dantin later retired from the Marine Corps with the rank of colonel.

== Political career ==
Dantin ran for the office of governor of Mississippi in 1975. He placed third in the Democratic primary, earning 179,472 votes. In 1978 he won the Democratic nomination for a U.S. Senate seat in Mississippi. He lost the general election to Republican Thad Cochran, taking only 32 percent of the vote, with many black Democrats instead choosing to vote for independent Charles Evers. He endorsed Wayne Dowdy in the 1991 Mississippi gubernatorial election.

== Later life ==
Dantin died at his home in Columbia, Mississippi, on January 10, 2012, at the age of 82.

== Works cited ==
- Bolton, Charles C. (2013). William F. Winter and the New Mississippi: A Biography. Jackson: University Press of Mississippi. ISBN 978-1-61703-787-0.
- Krane, Dale; Shaffer, Stephen D. (1992). Mississippi Government and Politics: Modernizers Versus Traditionalists. University of Nebraska Press. ISBN 9780803277588.
- Lamis, Alexander P., ed. (1999). Southern Politics in the 1990s. Louisiana State University Press. ISBN 9780807166765.
- Sumners, Cecil L. (1998). The Governors of Mississippi. Pelican Publishing. ISBN 9781455605217.

Party political offices
Preceded by James Eastland	Democratic nominee for U.S. Senator from Mississippi (Class 2); 1978	Succeeded by William F. Winter
