= Richard Olney Arrington =

American judge (1897–1963)

Associate Justice of the Supreme Court of Mississippi
- In office September 1950 – July 9, 1963
- Succeeded by: Thomas Pickens Brady

Assistant Attorney General of Mississippi
- In office 1941 – September 1950

Member of the Mississippi Senate from the 11th district
- In office January 1932 – January 1940
- Preceded by: C. Hooker Miller
- Succeeded by: Luther E. Grice

Personal details
- Born: January 21, 1897 Monticello, Mississippi
- Died: July 9, 1963 (aged 66)
- Party: Democrat

Richard Olney Arrington (January 21, 1897 – July 9, 1963) was a Mississippi politician and jurist. He was a justice of the Supreme Court of Mississippi from 1950 to 1963. He also was a member of the Mississippi Senate, representing the state's 11th senatorial district (Copiah County) as a Democrat from 1932 to 1940.

== Biography ==
Richard Olney Arrington was born on January 21, 1897, in Monticello, Mississippi. He graduated from the University of Mississippi School of Law and served in the U. S. Navy during World War I. He was a member of the Mississippi State Senate, representing the 11th district as a Democrat, from 1932 to 1940. In 1941, he became the Assistant Attorney General of Mississippi. He held that office until he was appointed by Governor Fielding Wright to the position of Associate Justice of the Supreme Court of Mississippi in September 1950. He won re-election twice in that office. While still holding the position, he died of an apparent heart attack on July 9, 1963.

Political offices
| Preceded by Substantially reconfigured court | Justice of the Supreme Court of Mississippi; 1950–1963 | Succeeded by Thomas Pickens Brady |
