= Deloss Walker =

Vernon Deloss Walker
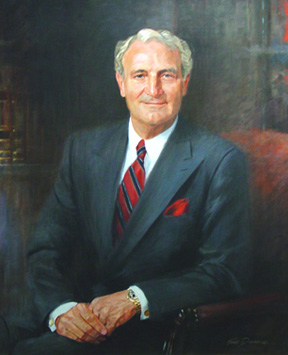
- Born: August 14, 1931; O'Kean, Arkansas, U.S.
- Died: April 19, 1996 (aged 64)
- Occupations: Advertising executive political campaign consultant

Vernon Deloss Walker (August 14, 1931 – April 19, 1996) was an American advertising executive and political campaign consultant. In October 1965, Walker founded the Memphis, Tennessee-based advertising firm Walker + Associates, Inc. Walker played a major role in politics, corporate marketing and philanthropy throughout the South from the 1960s to 1990s.

== Political Campaign Consulting ==
According to Time magazine, Walker and his firm consulted with and managed the campaigns of Al Gore, Jim Sasser, and Bill Clinton, among others.

Recalling Alabama's 1978 Governor’s race in which Fob James defeated a number of seasoned political veterans, Alabama political columnist Steve Flowers wrote,

Fob realized he was no political professional ... so he sought out professional advice. He had the money to think big and wanted to know who the best political consultant in the South was. It was an easy answer: Deloss Walker, a political public relations genius who lived in Memphis, Tenn. His track record for electing governors of southern states was 5–0. The scenario was the same for all five upset victories. He took an obscure, unknown candidate and elected him governor over a well-known incumbent or favorite. He had just taken an unknown school board member named Dale Bumpers and made him Governor of Arkansas. Deloss Walker was the most renowned and expensive political guru in the country in 1977.

In his 1998 autobiography, Personal Reflections on a Public Life, Joe Frank Harris, the former Governor of Georgia, recalls the hiring of Deloss Walker and Walker + Associates to run his campaign in 1982: "The broadcast and newspaper media are, of course, a potent force, and if you can gain access to them effectively and with enough repetition, you can move name identification along very quickly. We were able to do that with the assistance of Deloss Walker and Walker and Associates, a public relations group from Memphis, Tennessee whom I had met though a mutual friend…At the time we signed on Deloss had handled some fifty political campaigns and had won all but two of them."

== Advertising agency leader ==
Deloss Walker's firm, Walker + Associates, Inc. has served a variety of notable clients, including the regional co-op for McDonald's, the Tennessee Department of Tourist Development, and Lucite International. In 1987, Deloss Walker was named the Silver Medal Award winner. The award is the Memphis Advertising Federation's highest honor, recognizing an "entire career of outstanding accomplishment and contribution in advertising."

Since 1996, the firm has been led by president and chief executive officer Ceil Walker.

== Early years ==
Deloss Walker was born in O'Kean, AR. He attended Southern Baptist College, in Walnut Ridge, Ark. Walker served in the Korean War and was awarded the Bronze Star in combat in the battle of Heartbreak Ridge. Before founding Walker + Associates, Inc. advertising agency, Deloss Walker was general manager of Jonesboro, Arkansas radio station KNEA.

== Community involvement ==
Deloss Walker led or supported many initiatives to improve the community. In 1996, the Memphis Symphony honored Deloss and Ceil Walker with the Hebe Award for outstanding contributions and service to the arts. That year, well-known historian Shelby Foote was also honored by the Symphony with its Amphion Award.
