= John Bell Williams =

American politician (1918–1983)

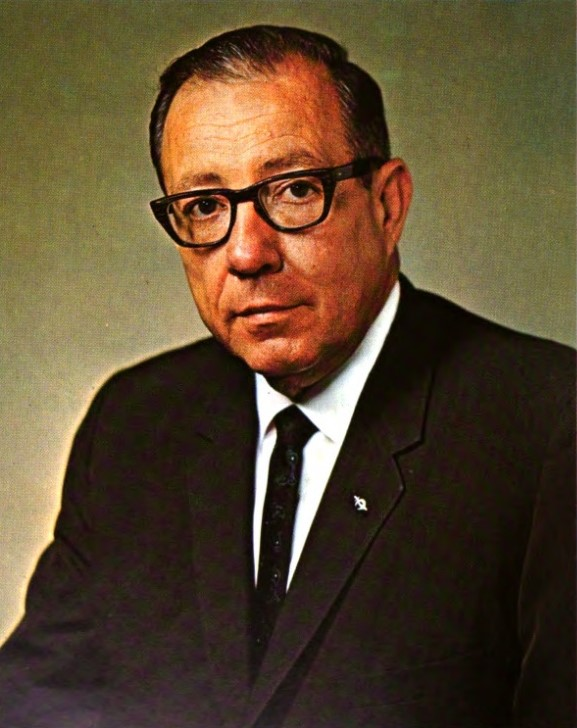
- Williams, c. 1969

55th Governor of Mississippi
- In office January 16, 1968 – January 18, 1972
- Lieutenant: Charles L. Sullivan
- Preceded by: Paul B. Johnson Jr.
- Succeeded by: Bill Waller

Member of the U.S. House of Representatives from Mississippi
- In office January 3, 1947 – January 16, 1968
- Preceded by: Dan R. McGehee
- Succeeded by: Charles H. Griffin
- Constituency: 7th district (1947–1953); 4th district (1953–1963); 3rd district (1963–1968)

Personal details
- Born: December 4, 1918 Raymond, Mississippi, U.S.
- Died: March 25, 1983 (aged 64) Brandon, Mississippi, U.S.
- Party: Democratic
- Spouse: Elizabeth Ann Wells
- Education: Hinds Community College; University of Mississippi; Mississippi College
- Profession: Lawyer

Military service
- Branch: United States Army
- Rank: Pilot
- Unit: United States Army Air Corps
- Battles/wars: World War II

John Bell Williams (December 4, 1918 – March 25, 1983) was an American Democratic politician who represented Mississippi in the U.S. House of Representatives from 1947 to 1968 and served as the 55th governor of Mississippi from 1968 to 1972.

He was first elected to Congress at the age of just 27 in 1946, representing southwestern Mississippi. He was re-elected repeatedly to Congress through the 1966 election in what was then a one-party Democratic state, but was stripped of his congressional leadership positions after he publicly supported Republican Barry Goldwater in the 1964 presidential election.

Williams was elected governor in 1967, defeating numerous candidates. He had a history of supporting racial segregation but complied with a federal court order to finally desegregate Mississippi's public schools.

== Early life and education ==
John Bell Williams was born in 1918 in Raymond, the county seat of Hinds County, Mississippi, near the state capital of Jackson. He graduated in 1938 from Hinds Community College, then known as Hinds Junior College. He attended the University of Mississippi at Oxford and graduated in 1940 from Mississippi College School of Law, then known simply as the Jackson Law School.

In November 1941, he enlisted with the United States Army Air Corps and served as a pilot during World War II. He retired from active service after losing the lower part of his left arm as a result of a bomber crash in 1944.

== Political career ==
In November 1946, Williams was elected at the age of 27 (he turned 28 in December) to the U.S. House of Representatives as a Democrat from southwestern Mississippi. He was the youngest U.S. Representative to have been elected from Mississippi.

Williams advocated states' rights and racial segregation. He joined his state's delegation in a walkout of the 1948 Democratic National Convention in Philadelphia, Pennsylvania. He supported Strom Thurmond's Dixiecrat presidential campaign, whose primary platform was racial segregation. Thurmond easily carried the electoral vote in Mississippi and three other states in the Deep South.

After the Supreme Court issued its Brown v. Board of Education ruling on May 17, 1954, which outlawed racial segregation in public schools, Williams made a speech on the House floor branding the day 'Black Monday', and subsequently signed the 1956 Southern Manifesto. Williams supported the Democratic Stevenson-Sparkman campaign in 1952, but he favored unpledged Democratic electors in 1956 and 1960.

In 1964, Williams endorsed Republican presidential nominee Barry Goldwater in the general election against incumbent Lyndon B. Johnson and helped raise funds for Goldwater in Mississippi. Because of his activities for Goldwater, the Democratic caucus (in the House of Representatives) stripped Williams and a colleague, Albert W. Watson of South Carolina, of their House seniority.

Williams remained a Democrat and retained his seat in 1966. Watson soon became a Republican.

=== Governor ===
In 1967, Williams ran for governor. The field of candidates was large, including former Governor Ross Barnett and two future governors, William Winter and Bill Waller. In the primary campaign, Williams claimed that, during the 1962 desegregation of the University of Mississippi, Barnett made a secret deal with the Kennedys over the admission of James Meredith, while publicly claiming to do everything to maintain college segregation.

In the first round of balloting, Williams finished second to Winter, the moderate candidate. In the runoff, Williams defeated Winter by 61,000 votes. In the general election, Williams handily defeated Democrat-turned-Republican Rubel Phillips, in his second unsuccessful campaign for governor. Phillips' running mate for lieutenant governor in 1963, Stanford Morse, a member of the Mississippi State Senate from Gulfport from 1956 to 1964, endorsed Williams in the 1967 race. During the campaign, Williams joked that when the returns were tabulated, the Republicans "won't be able to find a Rubel in the rubble."

During Williams' term as governor, Mississippi was ordered to desegregate its public school system by a federal court, as it had made little progress since the 1954 U.S. Supreme Court ruling that deemed such public schools unconstitutional. A case had been brought by civil rights activists and some desegregation of schools had happened at local levels. Williams did not defy the court. In December 1978, 24 years after Brown v. Board of Education, the Mississippi legislature officially removed from the state constitution the mandate that schools be segregated. In the ensuing popular election to confirm or reject this action, 29.90% of those voting voted against removing the language.

=== Return to private practice ===
After his term, Williams resumed his law practice. Williams endorsed Republicans Gerald Ford in 1976 and Ronald Reagan in 1980 for president, rather than the Democratic nominee both times, Jimmy Carter, despite the fact that Carter was also a Southerner.

== Death ==
After leaving office, Williams divorced his wife. He died in Rankin County on March 25, 1983, being found dead in his apartment the following day; the cause was ruled to be a heart attack. He was buried on March 28, 1983, and his funeral was held in the First Baptist Church in Jackson the following day.

== See also ==
- Conservative Democrat

== Works cited ==
- Sansing, David G. (2016). Mississippi Governors: Soldiers, Statesmen, Scholars, Scoundrels (first ed.). Oxford: Nautilus Publishing Company. ISBN 978-1-936946-81-5.

Party political offices
Preceded by Paul B. Johnson Jr.	Democratic nominee for Governor of Mississippi; 1967	Succeeded by Bill Waller
U.S. House of Representatives
Preceded by Dan R. McGehee	Member of the U.S. House of Representatives from Mississippi's 7th congressional district January 3, 1947–January 3, 1953	Succeeded by District eliminated after Census 1950
Preceded by Thomas Abernethy	Member of the U.S. House of Representatives from Mississippi's 4th congressional district January 3, 1953–January 3, 1963	Succeeded by W. Arthur Winstead
Preceded by Frank E. Smith	Member of the U.S. House of Representatives from Mississippi's 3rd congressional district January 3, 1963–January 16, 1968	Succeeded by Charles H. Griffin
Political offices
Preceded by Paul B. Johnson Jr.	Governor of Mississippi; January 16, 1968–January 18, 1972	Succeeded by Bill Waller
