= Charles L. Sullivan =

American politician

Charles Sullivan
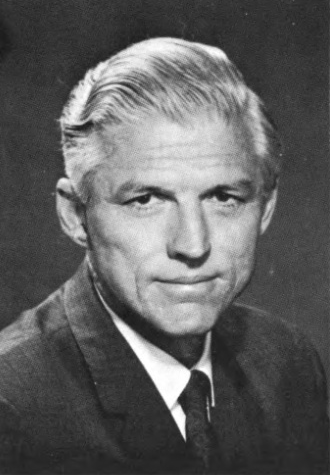

24th Lieutenant Governor of Mississippi
- In office January 15, 1968 – January 17, 1972
- Governor: John Bell Williams
- Preceded by: Carroll Gartin
- Succeeded by: William F. Winter

Personal details
- Born: August 20, 1924 New Orleans, Louisiana, U.S.
- Died: April 18, 1979 (aged 54) Clarksdale, Mississippi, U.S.
- Party: Democratic
- Education: Tulane University (BA); University of Mississippi (LLB)

Military service
- Allegiance: United States
- Branch/service: United States Air Force
- Unit: Air National Guard
- Battles/wars: World War II; Korean War

Charles L. Sullivan (August 20, 1924 – April 18, 1979) was an American politician, attorney and military pilot. He served the 24th Lieutenant Governor of Mississippi from 1968 to 1972 under Governor John Bell Williams. He was also a general in the United States Air National Guard.

== Early life and education ==
Charles L. Sullivan was born on August 20, 1924, in New Orleans and was raised in Greene and Perry counties of Mississippi. His father was a school superintendent. He attended Hintonville High School, Knox College, and Tulane University and before earning a law degree from the University of Mississippi School of Law in 1950. He married Mary Lester Rayner and had four children with her.

== Career ==
Sullivan was interested in having a political career from a young age. A trial attorney, Sullivan ran for President of the United States in the 1960 presidential election as the candidate of the Constitution Party. He and his running mate, Merritt Curtis, received 18,162 votes in Texas, the only state where he was on the ballot, or 0.79% of the popular vote. In 1963, Sullivan ran for Governor of Mississippi and lost to eventual winner, Lieutenant Governor Paul B. Johnson Jr. Sullivan was a staunch segregationist and modeled his campaign on defending racial segregation in Mississippi as it came under attack by the federal government and local civil rights activists.

Sullivan won statewide political office during a hard-fought campaign during the 1967 elections. As Governor Paul B. Johnson Jr., running for his old spot as Lieutenant Governor of Mississippi, campaigned for law and order, Sullivan and eventual Governor-elect John Bell Williams emphasized their ability to roll back required federal changes to the state's segregation policy as outlined by the Civil Rights Act of 1964 and Voting Rights Act of 1965. Despite thousands of blacks newly registered to vote in Mississippi, the two segregationist candidates for the executive office, Williams and Sullivan, claimed overwhelming victories. Sullivan was sworn in as Lieutenant Governor on January 15, 1968.

In the next four years of Sullivan's term, he and Williams attempted to mollify whites' angst in response to the school desegregation orders (often called "immediate integration") as ordered by the Federal judiciary in Alexander v. Holmes County Board of Education. Both Sullivan and Williams endorsed white flight from the state's public school system for hastily established private academies that then-U.S. Senator Walter Mondale called "segregation academies". After losing the Democratic gubernatorial primary to Bill Waller, he left office on January 17, 1972.

Sullivan unsuccessfully sought the Democratic nomination for the U.S. Senate in 1978 in a race ultimately won by Republican Thad Cochran.

== Death ==
Traveling home from Oxford, Mississippi, Sullivan was killed when his plane crashed in a remote area near Clarksdale, Mississippi. He was 54.

== Works cited ==
- Hendricks, Erin (2002). ""I'll Take Mississippi": The Gubernatorial Campaigns of Charles L. Sullivan". Catalyst. Vol. 1, no. 2. pp. 26–30. doi:10.18785/cat.0102.10.
- Mississippi Official and Statistical Register 1980–1984. Jackson: Mississippi Secretary of State. 1980. OCLC 1131544573.

Party political offices
Preceded by Carroll Gartin	Democratic nominee for Lieutenant Governor of Mississippi; 1967	Succeeded by William F. Winter
Political offices
Preceded by Carroll Gartin	Lieutenant Governor of Mississippi; 1968–1972	Succeeded by William F. Winter
