= Jimmy Swan =

American country musician

James Eldon Swan (November 18, 1912 – 29 October 1995) was an American country musician and later, a segregationist political candidate.

== Early life ==
James Edgar Swan was born on November 18, 1912, in the Sand Hill area of Cullman County, Alabama. After his father left the family, Swan moved with his mother to Birmingham in 1922.

At age 15, he won a talent show at an Alabama radio station. He married at age 17 with Grace Armour, a beauty queen, and quickly had three children, and was unable to put together a band until the beginning of the 1940s, due to him having to provide for his family.

== Musical career ==
In 1966, Swan was more concerned with his radio station in Hattiesburg, WBKH, than about his singing.

=== Democratic primary for Governor of Mississippi ===
==== 1967 election ====
In 1967, Swan ran in the Democratic primary for the governorship of Mississippi. When he officially announced his campaign, he recited a speech written by his campaign manager Asa Earl Carter, whom he met at the inauguration of Lurleen Wallace. Swan never finished high school and had great difficulty reading the written copy of the speech, but, with Carter’s help, he was able to memorize its contents. He ran on a White supremacy platform, wearing a white suit to stress his political program. His campaign bodyguard Pat Massengale was a member of the Knights of the Green Forrest, a Ku Klux Klan organization.

Swan supported school segregation and the creation of "FREE, private, SEGREGATED SCHOOLS for every white child in the State of Mississippi" in the first twelve months of his term, or else he would resign and publicly apologize, and called to save Mississippi "from the moral degeneracy of total mass integration that Washington has decreed for our children this fall", when schools were to be integrated by the HEW.

He supported White supremacy. He described the urban riots as a part of a "Communist-inspired revolution", promising to use extreme force if such riots occurred in Mississippi.

He managed to attract segregationists who disagreed with how Ross Barnett managed the Ole Miss riot of 1962, finding him too moderate.

Finally, he called to "put the Bible, prayer and patriotism back in the schools".

He finished third, with 18.18% of the vote.

==== 1971 election ====
Swan ran for the Democratic nomination for governor on a segregationist platform, the lone one alongside Judge Marshall Perry of Grenada.

Although he somewhat tried to soften his rhetoric, he still praised Theodore Bilbo, brandishing in public his book Take Your Choice: Separation Or Mongrelization.

== Discography ==
Year	Title	Record label
1952	Juke Joint Mama / I Had A Dream	Trumpet Records
1952	Triflin’ On Me / I Love You Too Much	Trumpet Records
1953	The Last Letter / The Little Church	MGM Records
1953	Losers Weepers / Mark Of Shame	Trumpet Records
1954	Lonesome Daddy Blues / One More Time	Trumpet Records
1955	Frost On My Roof / It’s Your Turn To Cry	MGM Records
1956	Hey, Baby Baby / Why Did You Change Your Mind?	MGM Records
1956	Country Cattin’ / The Way That You’re Living	MGM Records
1957	Lonesome Man / Good and Lonesome	MGM Records
1960	No One Loves A Broken Heart / Don’t Conceal Your Wedding Ring	Decca Records
1965	Honky Tonkin’ / I Love You Too Much	JB Records
1965	Rattlesnake Daddy / It Takes A Lonesome Man	JB Records
1966	Walkin’ My Dog / Asleep In The Deep	JB Records
1968	Good and Lonesome / Why Did You Change Your Mind?	Big Howdy Records

== Works cited ==
- Ryan, Marc (2004). Trumpet Records. University of Mississippi Press. ISBN 9781617035258.

== See also ==
- Jimmy Swan at Allmusic
