= John L. Dale =

American politician

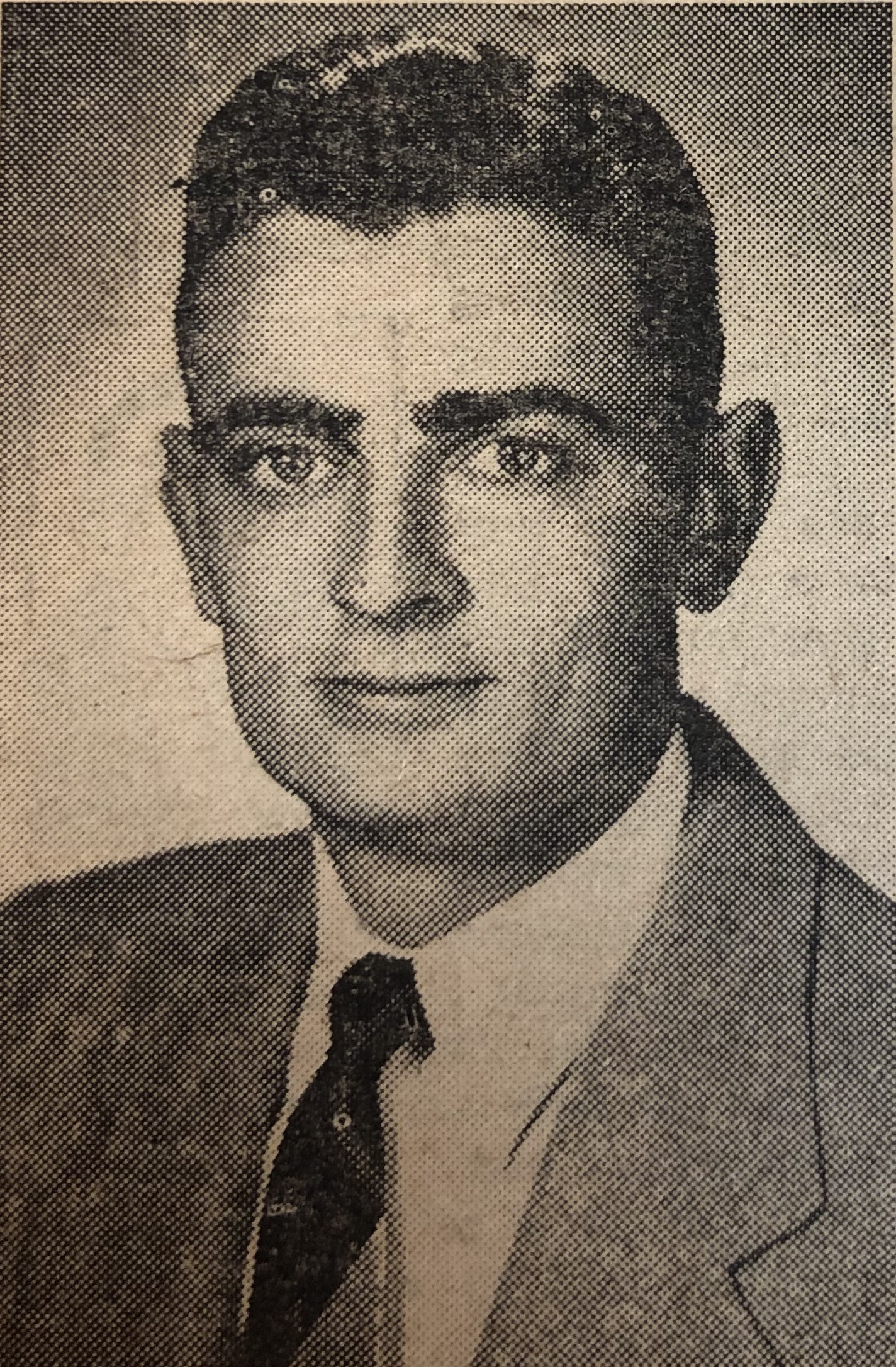
- Dale in 1955

49th Treasurer of Mississippi
- In office 1980–1980
- Governor: William F. Winter
- Preceded by: Edwin L. Pittman
- Succeeded by: William J. Cole

Personal details
- Born: October 1, 1928 Leaf, Mississippi, U.S.
- Died: December 13, 1980 (aged 52)
- Party: Democratic
- Education: University of Southern Mississippi; Jackson School of Law

John L. Dale (October 1, 1928 – December 13, 1980) was an American politician. He served as treasurer of Mississippi in 1980.

== Life and career ==
Dale was born in Leaf, Mississippi. He attended the University of Southern Mississippi and Jackson School of Law.

Dale served as treasurer of Mississippi in 1980.

Dale died on December 13, 1980, at the age of 52.
