= Elise Varner Winter =

First Lady of Mississippi

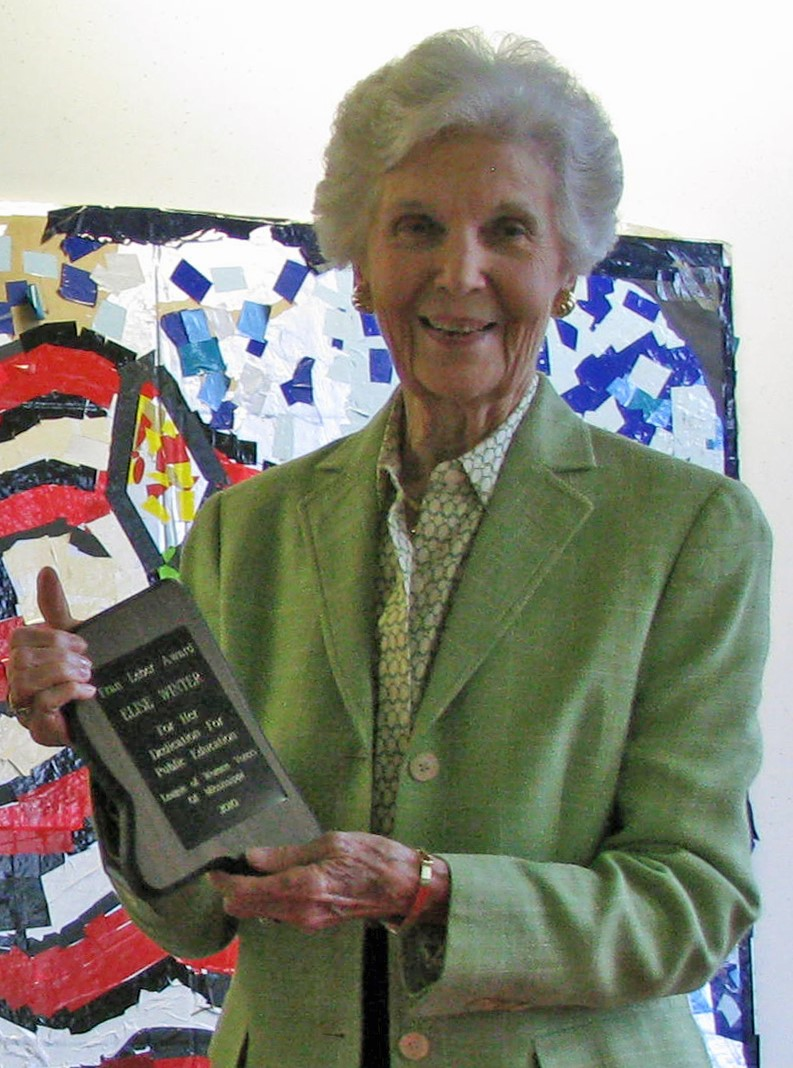
- Winter in 2010

First Lady of Mississippi
- In office January 22, 1980 – January 10, 1984
- Governor: William F. Winter
- Preceded by: Zelma Smith Finch

Second Lady of Mississippi
- In office January 17, 1972 – January 14, 1976
- Governor: Bill Waller
- Preceded by: Mary Lester Rayner Sullivan

Personal details
- Born: May 9, 1926 Senatobia, Mississippi, U.S.
- Died: July 17, 2021 (aged 95) Jackson, Mississippi, U.S.
- Party: Democratic
- Spouse: William F. Winter
- Children: 3
- Parent(s): William Elliot John Varner; Mamie Veazey
- Education: Northwest Junior College; University of Mississippi

Elise Varner Winter (May 9, 1926 - July 17, 2021) was an American civic leader and activist who served as the Second Lady of Mississippi from 1972 to 1976 and as the First Lady of Mississippi from 1980 to 1984. She was an advocate for public education, affordable housing, prison reform, and advancement of the arts.

Winter led a statewide grassroots campaign for educational reforms and pushed for the 1982 Educational Reform Act to be passed in the Mississippi State Legislature. She helped establish Central Mississippi Correctional Facility, then a women's prison, in Pearl, Mississippi upon discovering that women were being incarcerated at the overwhelmingly male prison. Winter was responsible for establishing a visitor center for the families of inmates at the Mississippi State Penitentiary and established a working greenhouse and garden for the inmates there.

After leaving public life, Winter served on the International Board of Directors for Habitat for Humanity and was a founding member of the organization's chapter in Jackson, Mississippi.

== Early life and family ==
Elise Varner Winter was born Elise Varner on May 9, 1926, in Senatobia to Mamie Veazey Varner and William Elliot John Varner. She had two siblings, John and Virginia. Winter's father was a pharmacist and politician who served as the mayor of Senatobia and her mother was a bookkeeper. The family lived with her mother's parents in a large, old house on Main Street in Senatobia.

After completing high school, Winter attended Northwest Junior College for two years before transferring to the University of Mississippi, graduating in 1948 with a Bachelor of Arts degree in history. She later attended graduate school for a master's degree and teaching certificate.

== Public life and advocacy work ==
Winter was a strong advocate for public education, affordable housing, and the advancement of the arts. She was active in Habitat for Humanity and played a key role in the development of the program in both the state and nation.

She was an active member of her husband's administration, and sought to bring changes to the state's educational system. She had a seat at staff meetings on policy and administrative decision making. According to Dick Molpus, who served as her husband's director of federal state programs, she was a "quick strategic thinker" who commanded attention and respect from the governor's all-male staff. She advocated for a separate women's prison, now known as Central Mississippi Correctional Facility, in Pearl upon discovering that women were being incarcerated in the overwhelmingly male prison. Winter was responsible for establishing a visitor center for the families of inmates at Parchman Farm. Through her efforts, she secured funding for the project and worked with prison staff to have inmates carry out the construction of the project. Winter often visited the Parchman grounds to speak with inmates and corrections officials. She advocated for increased funding for prisons, better living conditions for inmates, and better rehabilitation programs. She developed a vegetable garden which provided work, job training, and fresh produce for the inmates year-round. She instigated the construction of a greenhouse which became the prison's rehabilitation program in horticulture.

She led a statewide grassroots campaign to obtain public support for state educational reforms. She made hundreds of speeches, visited schools, and spoke at nine forums across the state. She pushed for the 1982 Educational Reform Act in the Mississippi State Legislature.

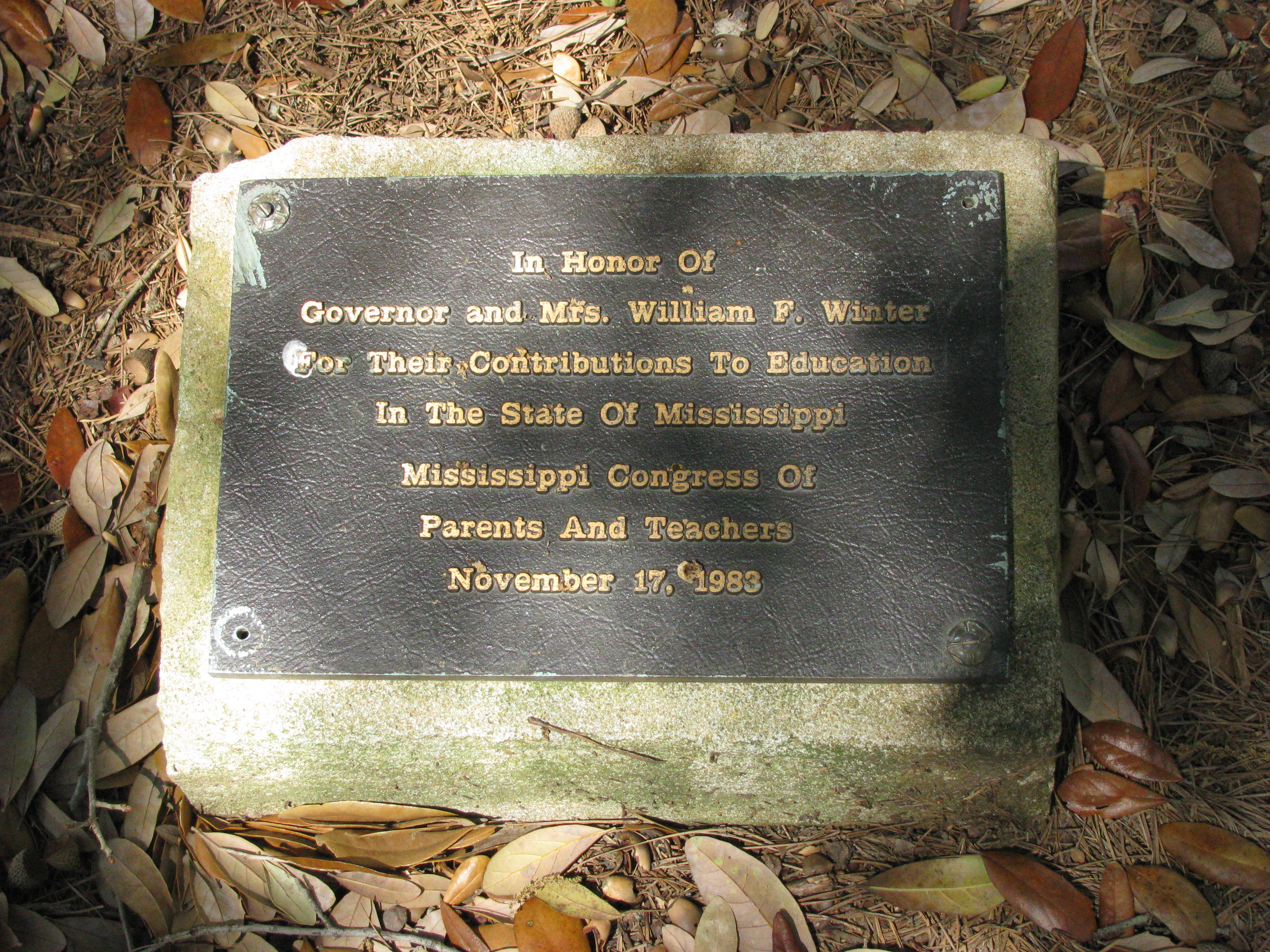
Plaque at the Mississippi State Capitol honoring Winter's and her husband's contributions to public education

As hostess, she entertained at the Mississippi Governor's Mansion and hosted dinners with notable artists, writers, businessmen, and political leaders including Eudora Welty, Leontyne Price, Walker Percy, Shelby Foote, Margaret Walker Alexander, and Willie Morris. She collaborated with state officials and specialists to develop a collection of antique furnishings and art for the mansion and supervised the organizing of Friends of the Mansion.

When inmates from the Mississippi State Penitentiary were assigned to the mansion on a work release program, Winter assisted in teaching skills and helping them find employment upon their release. One former inmate, Edgar Glover, was hired by St. Andrew's Cathedral due to Winter's influence.

After leaving public life, Winter became a founder, board member, and fundraiser for Habitat for Humanity in the Jackson area. She served on the organization's international board and, in 2012, was a recipient of the Founder's Award by the Jackson Habitat Chapter.

In 2015, she authored the memoir Once in a Lifetime: Reflections of a Mississippi First Lady.

== Personal life ==
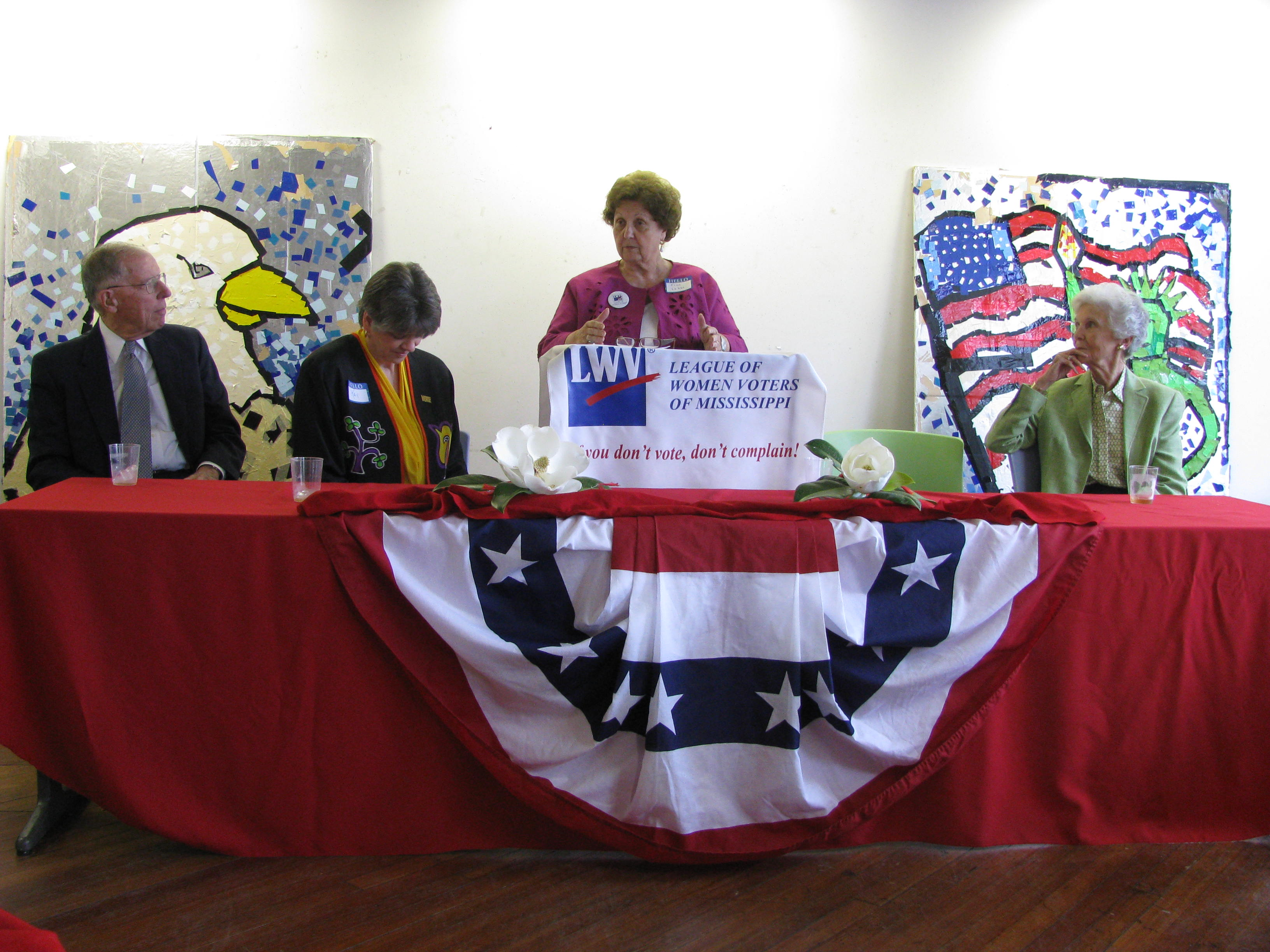
Winter (far right) and her husband (far left) at a Mississippi League of Women Voters event in 2010

While a student at Ole Miss, she was introduced to her brother's roommate William F. Winter, a young World War II veteran who was enrolled at the University of Mississippi School of Law. The two began dating and, after four years together, they married on October 10, 1950. Her husband, like his father William Aylmer Winter, pursued a political career and was elected to the Mississippi House of Representatives in 1947.

She and her husband had three daughters together, Eleanor, Anne, and Lele.

Her husband died in 2020 and she died on July 17, 2021. Due to the COVID-19 pandemic in the United States, the Winter family did not hold public funeral services for them. In May 2022, Former U.S. President Bill Clinton and former Mississippi Governor Haley Barbour were both in attendance at a memorial service for the Winters held at the Two Mississippi Museums. Clinton gave the keynote remarks during the service.

== Works cited ==
- Bolton, Charles C. (2013). William F. Winter and the New Mississippi: A Biography. Jackson: University Press of Mississippi. ISBN 978-1-61703-787-0.
