= Edwin L. Pittman =

American judge (1935–2024)

Edwin Pittman
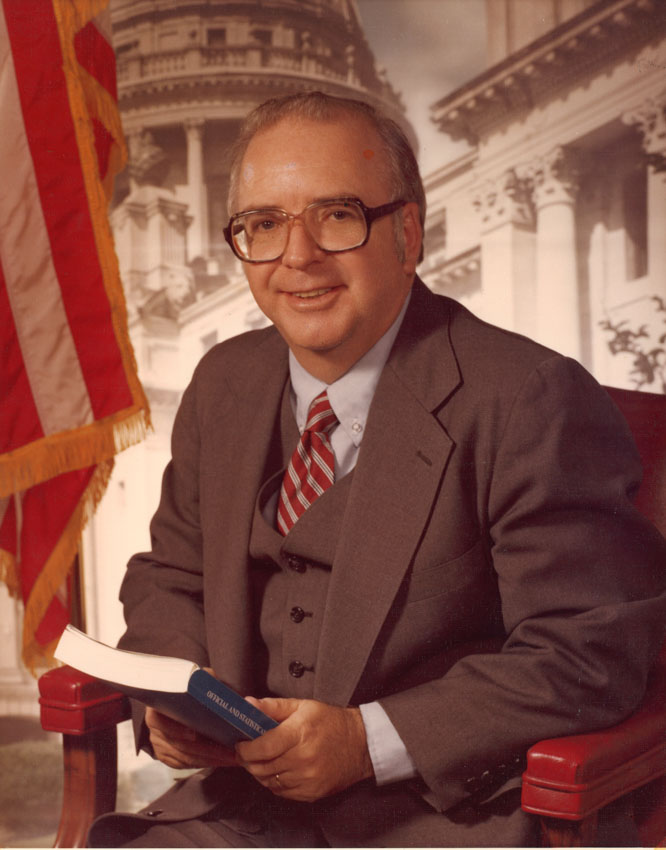
- Official portrait, 1981

Chief Justice of the Supreme Court of Mississippi
- In office January 2001 – March 31, 2004
- Preceded by: Lenore L. Prather
- Succeeded by: James W. Smith Jr.

Justice of the Supreme Court of Mississippi
- In office 1989–2004
- Succeeded by: Michael K. Randolph

37th Attorney General of Mississippi
- In office 1984–1988
- Governor: William Allain
- Preceded by: William Allain
- Succeeded by: Mike Moore

32nd Secretary of State of Mississippi
- In office 1980–1984
- Governor: William F. Winter
- Preceded by: Heber Austin Ladner
- Succeeded by: Dick Molpus

Mississippi State Treasurer
- In office 1976–1980
- Governor: Cliff Finch
- Preceded by: Brad Dye
- Succeeded by: John L. Dale

Personal details
- Born: Edwin Lloyd Pittman; January 2, 1935 Hattiesburg, Mississippi, U.S.
- Died: September 25, 2024 (aged 89) Ridgeland, Mississippi, U.S.
- Party: Democratic
- Education: University of Southern Mississippi (BS); University of Mississippi (JD)

Edwin Lloyd Pittman (January 2, 1935 – September 25, 2024) was an American jurist and politician who served as a justice and Chief Justice of the Supreme Court of Mississippi from 1989 to 2001 and as chief justice from 2001 to 2004. He also served as the state's attorney general, secretary of state, and treasurer. Pittman reached the rank of brigadier general in the Mississippi National Guard.

== Early life and education ==
Pittman was born in Hattiesburg, Mississippi, on January 2, 1935. He received his Bachelor of Science degree from the University of Southern Mississippi in 1957 and his J.D. from the University of Mississippi in 1960.

== Political career ==
Pittman was first elected to the Mississippi State Senate in 1964 and was reelected in 1968 from Forest County. In 1975, he was elected as the State's Treasurer. He was sworn in on January 14, 1976.

In 1980, he was elected Mississippi's Secretary of State. In 1984, he was elected attorney general.

Pittman ran for the 1987 Democratic nomination for governor, finishing fifth.

== Judicial career ==
Pittman was first elected to the State Supreme Court in 1988 and reelected in 1996.

=== Notable rulings ===
In 2000, Justice Pittman ruled that the courts are not in the position of determining the state flag. He wrote, "In this case, the NAACP failed to offer any proof that the flying of the state flag deprived any citizen of a constitutionally protected right."

== Personal life and death ==
Pittman was married to Virginia Lund Pittman and had seven children. He died on September 25, 2024, at the age of 89.

Party political offices
Preceded by Heber Austin Ladner	Democratic nominee for Secretary of State of Mississippi; 1979	Succeeded by Dick Molpus
Political offices
Preceded by Lenore L. Prather	Chief Justice of the Mississippi Supreme Court; 2001–2004	Succeeded by Michael K. Randolph
Preceded by Joseph Zuccaro	Justice of the Mississippi Supreme Court; 1989–2001	Succeeded by Michael K. Randolph
