= George H. Holland =

American politician

George H. Holland was an American lawyer who served as a state legislator and Auditor of Accounts (Treasurer) in Mississippi. A Republican, he served in the Mississippi House of Representatives.

He was the son of Charles Miller Holland Jr. He was a delegate at the 1868 Mississippi Constitutional Convention.

He was a Republican nominee for Mississippi State Treasurer on a ticket with Adelbert Ames, Alexander K. Davis, James Hill, William H. Gibbs, George E. Harris, and T. W. Cardozo. They were elected. He was succeeded by M. L. Holland.

At a joint session of the Mississippi legislature on February 17, 1875, the House and Senate passed resolutions honoring Holland after his death. African American Representative John W. Randolph said of him, "[H]e had learned to know no man on account of his color, and this, this alone, commends him to our consideration and favor, and also to posterity."
