= Oliver Randolph =

American lawyer and politician

Oliver Randolph (October 31, 1877 – October 2, 1951) was an American lawyer and politician. A member of the Republican Party, he was the first African American to be admitted to the New Jersey bar, the second African American elected to the New Jersey Legislature, and the only African American to serve as a delegate to the New Jersey Constitutional Convention of 1947.

== Early life and career ==
Randolph was born in Pass Christian, Harrison County, Mississippi in 1882 to John W. and Mary E.J. Randolph. He was the grandson of a Virginia slave. His father, John W. Randolph, served in the Mississippi Legislature in the Reconstruction Era. His brother, Joseph B. Randolph, became president of Claflin University in Orangeburg, South Carolina.

He graduated from Wiley College in Marshall, Texas and received a law degree from Howard University in Washington, D.C.

Randolph moved to Newark, New Jersey and was admitted to the New Jersey bar in 1914, the first African American to do so.

== Political career ==
Randolph entered Republican politics in Essex County, New Jersey and was elected to the New Jersey General Assembly in November 1922. He became the second African American to serve in the state legislature, after Walter G. Alexander's election to the Assembly in 1920.

In the Assembly, Randolph authored the state's anti-lynching law and introduced legislation opposing the Ku Klux Klan.

In 1923, he was appointed Special Assistant United States District Attorney for New Jersey on the recommendation of U.S. Senator Walter E. Edge. He was the first African American to hold this position, serving for ten years. He was appointed a Deputy Attorney General in 1946.

In 1947, he was the sole African American among the 81 delegates to the New Jersey Constitutional Convention. Representing Essex County, he served on the convention's Committee on Rights, Privileges, Amendments, and Miscellaneous Provisions. He successfully advocated for what became Article 1, Paragraph 5 of the Constitution of New Jersey, which states: "No person shall be denied the enjoyment of any civil or military right, nor be discriminated against in the exercise of any civil or military right, nor be segregated in the militia or in the public schools, because of religious principles, race, color, ancestry or national origin."

Randolph died at Newark's Presbyterian Hospital in 1951.

The Garden State Bar Association, an affiliate chapter of the National Bar Association, annually presents the Oliver Randolph Award to celebrate Randolph's legacy as a civil rights pioneer.

== See also ==
- List of African-American officeholders (1900–1959)
