= Mississippi Education Reform Act of 1982 =

US state law

The Mississippi Education Reform Act of 1982 was an education and revenue law enacted in the U.S. state of Mississippi in 1982.

== Background ==
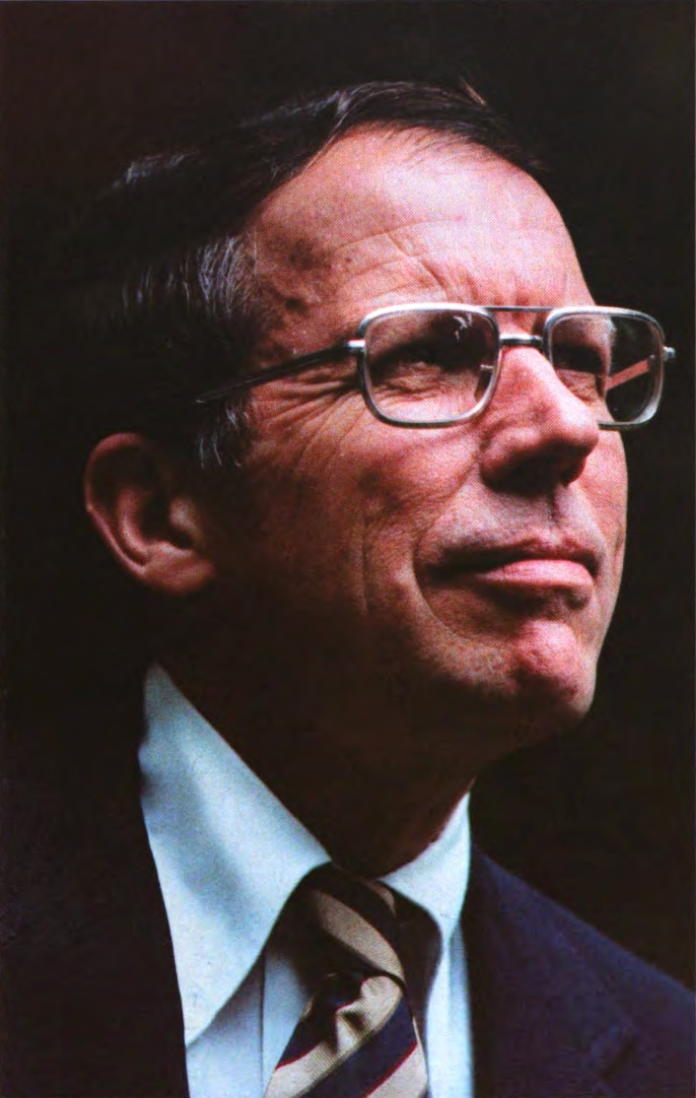
Governor William F. Winter pushed for educational reform legislation in Mississippi in the early 1980s with the hopes of improving economic outcomes in the state.

Mississippi's economy in the 1980s was under strain; while the state had enjoyed some success in attracting low-wage, low-skill industry to replace declining agricultural fortunes due to its cheap labor force and low taxes, American companies were increasingly moving their low-skill positions abroad. In the 1980s it had the lowest income per capita among the states. Governor William F. Winter believed the state needed to be competitive in attracting high-skill industry and that the best way to do this was to reform the state public education system, arguing that the economy underperformed "because we have too many underproductive people—too many unskilled people—too many undereducated people. And we are going to be last until we do something about that problem." At the beginning of its 1980 session, he asked the legislature to form a committee to study education reform. This led to the founding of the Blue Ribbon Committee on Education, comprising governor's appointees, legislators, and the State Superintendent of Education. In December the committee produced 23 proposals for improving public education, including the establishment of public kindergartens, the creation of a new state board of education, strengthening the compulsory education law, new measures to equalize funding across different schools, and salary hikes for school staff. The committee also offered several suggestions for funding the proposals, including repealing the 1979 tax cut; increasing alcohol, tobacco, and soft drink taxes, hiking the corporate income tax, and raising the oil and gas severance tax.

The proposals died in the 1981 session, so Winter began cultivating support for education reform in preparation for the 1982 session. He met with business leaders, civic groups, and teachers' organizations to feel out their opinions, while his wife and aides toured schools and delivered speeches. The effort was successful overall in gaining public support for education reform. Most state education groups, the NAACP, Mississippi Economic Council, League of Women Voters, and Children's Defense Fund all endorsed the proposals. A late 1981 poll conducted by Mississippi State University found that 61 percent of Mississippians supported public kindergartens and 91 percent supported stronger compulsory education measures. By 1982, Winter had established a network of lobbyists ready to boost his ideas.

Despite the increased public support and organizing, Winter's proposals only had marginally more success in the 1982 session. A bill to establish public kindergartens survived through several committees in the House, but faced a deadline for approval by February 11. Since the bill was behind many others for consideration, its chief sponsor agreed with Speaker Buddie Newman and other House leaders to adjourn on February 10 and let the bill expire. On February 10, towards the end of the day, Newman rejected motions to advance the bill and instead called a voice vote to adjourn. Declaring the motion passed, he adjourned the House and walked out of the room, despite other legislators protesting this move and demanding a roll call vote. Regardless of whatever the true feelings were of a majority of the state house members, Newman's adjournment appeared to some lawmakers and much of the public to be an abuse of power. Ultimately, the only reform-supportive move by the legislature was its scheduling of a referendum for November to amend the state constitution to create a new board of education. The referendum was narrowly approved.

The media began to criticize Winter for ineffectiveness, but the press directed most of its attacks against the legislature. ABC's 20/20 program broadcast a feature on education in Mississippi in August, blaming Newman for the lack of progress on reform. Winter's staff spent the overwhelming portion of the latter half the year focused on lining up public support for the education proposals. The governor went on speaking tours, while radio and television advertisements were run with the aim of putting pressure on lawmakers.

== Legislative history ==
The approval of the November referendum encouraged Winter enough to convince him to call the legislature into a special session on December 6 solely to consider education reform. Senate Finance Committee chairman Ellis B. Bodron opposed a special session and declared that he would not call any meetings of his committee, which would prevent any revenue being appropriated. House Ways and Means Committee chairman Sonny Merideth opposed any tax hike and also thought that should taxes be raised the revenue should be diverted to existing programs. He responded to the scheduling of the special session by encouraging his colleagues to pass a resolution thanking the governor for his concern, assuring him that the matter would be addressed in regular session, and then adjourning.

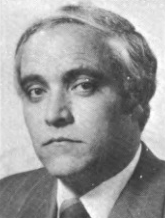
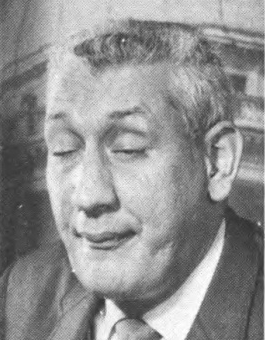
House Ways and Means Committee Chairman Sonny Merideth (left) and Senate Finance Committee Chairman Ellis B. Bodron (right) both initially opposed education reform proposals but offered their support under intense political pressure.

In an attempt to ease the situation, Winter called a meeting with Bodron and Merideth. The governor told them that he would abandon the severance tax increase and back any other revenue source that the legislators preferred. Legislative leadership held a meeting the next day to discuss the situation, followed by a press conference hosted by Newman and Lieutenant Governor Brad Dye. In response to a question about Merideth's proposal to adjourn, Dye indicated that he and his colleagues "weren't thinking in those terms". The day the session opened, Bodron remained adamant that his committee would not consider any tax legislation. Merideth continued to argue that the legislature should adjourn until Newman warned him, "Sonny, this House isn't going to adjourn." Winter opened the session with a speech to both houses of the legislature imploring them to improve the state's education system, arguing, "Per capita income is tied directly, unequivocally, and irrefutably to education. Unless we take some very specific actions to improve our educational system, it will never be adequate to move our state out of last place in per capita income."

On December 7, a Senate committee voted against a measure to create public kindergartens. The same day, Robert G. Clark Jr., the chairman of the House Education Committee, reached an agreement with Merideth; the Ways and Means Committee would pass the necessary revenue measures to fund whatever proposals the Education Committee approved. By December 10, the Education Committee had produced House Bill 4, which included public kindergartens, a raise for teacher salaries, new teaching certification and school accreditation standards, more robust compulsory education measures, and provisions to hire reading aides for elementary schools. The entire House convened at noon the following day to discuss the bill. Representatives proposed 16 different amendments to the legislation, some of which were adopted. After some House members expressed concern that the Senate would block the establishment of public kindergartens, Representative Tommy Walman told them, "This body has never charted its course by what happened down the hall, and by God I hope it doesn't start now. I want, for one time, the Senate to have kindergartens on the floor for a vote." That evening, the full House approved the bill, 80 votes to 38.

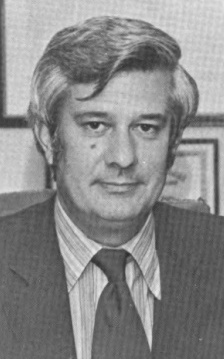
Lieutenant Governor Brad Dye intervened to ensure the education reform bill passed through the Senate Finance Committee.

Meanwhile, Winter met with Bodron to try and earn his support, but the senator continued to argue that education reform was expensive and unnecessary. Dye feared that Bodron would prevent the package from passing the Senate and called him the night the House passed the bill. Dye told him, "Ellis, what you do with your politics is fine, but in running your mouth, you've hurt my politics. I want you to add some Senate things to the House bill." When Bodron asked for clarification, Dye told him "I want a commitment out of you right now—that this bill is going to come out of Finance Committee and you'll support it. If you're not, this is going to be the first time the Education Committee has ever raised taxes in this state." Bodron then agreed to support the bill.

On December 13, the Senate convened to consider the House bill, which Dye referred to the Education Committee and Finance Committee. By the following morning, the Education Committee—chaired by Jack Gordon—had given its assent to the entire House bill. The Finance Committee discussed the legislation through the evening and recessed without taking any action. Worried about the bill's progress, governor's press secretary David Crews phoned Clarion-Ledger editor Charles Overby to advise him of the development. Overby intervened to change the copy of his paper's morning edition, reporting that the bill had stalled in the Senate. On December 15, the Senate Finance Committee reconvened and voted 11 to 9, to remove kindergartens from the bill. A senator then moved to table the legislation, effectively dropping it from consideration. The committee voted 11 to 10 to deny the motion, with Bodron—under pressure from Dye—casting the tie-breaking vote necessary to save it. Despite this, he continued to openly criticize the proponents of the bill and denounced Winter's young aides as "the Boys of Spring". The bill was eventually reported out of committee to the full Senate.

On the morning of December 16, Senator Gordon moved for the full Senate to consider the adoption of House Bill 4. Senator Perrin H. Purvis moved to amend the bill to restore the kindergarten provisions. His amendment was narrowly approved, 26 votes to 25. Several hours later Gordon proposed a vote on the full bill. The Senate voted in favor of adoption, 43 votes to nine. To resolve differences between the House and Senate versions of the legislation, a bicameral conference committee was convened. Consisting of Representatives Merideth, Clark, and Mike Nipper and Senators Bodron, Gordon, and John Fraiser, the committee debated the bill for three days, finishing their work on December 19.

The legislature convened the following day to vote on the final negotiated legislation, which established public kindergartens statewide, assigned reading aides in the classes of the first three grades of elementary schools, strengthened compulsory school attendance measures, created a school accreditation program, assigned powers and responsibilities to the new State Board of Education, and establish a school administrator training program. The House adopted the bill 96 votes to 25, followed by the Senate one hour later, 37 votes to 13. Winter signed the Education Reform Act into law on December 21, 1982.

== Provisions ==
=== Programs ===
The Education Reform Act mandated the establishment of public kindergartens in all school districts by 1986, with funding for their provision capped at $40 million annually. The kindergarten program would expire in 1990 unless renewed by the legislature. (Note: The purpose of the 1990 expiration was to allow the legislature to review kindergarten funding at that time.) It also, beginning in the fall of 1983, provided for the phasing in of teaching assistants over the course of two years in the first, second, and third grades to assist pupils in reading. The law enacted compulsory attendance measures for public school students aged six to 14, to begin in the fall of 1983 for six and seven-year-olds and phased in over several years. This was to be enforced by newly-hired truancy officers. Parents of homeschooled children or pupils enrolled in private schools were required to report the location of their children's schooling to a truancy officer. Failure to comply with the school attendance law could result in proceedings in youth courts and the levying of a $1,000 fine or a year's incarceration for parents of truant children. All public schoolteachers were given a $1,000 base salary raise, while regular annual experience raises were to be increased in the 1983/1984 school year, and teachers with doctorate degrees were to be placed on a new pay scale.

The reform act called for the establishment of a Commission on School Accreditation effective July 1, 1986, and tasked it with creating a performance-based school accreditation criteria which would be applied by special auditors to institutions in the state. The law delineated the powers of the new State Board of Education, granting it broad authority over the management of public schools, accreditation standards, and teacher training. It also tasked the board with devising a five-year education improvement plan. Furthermore, the legislation called upon the State Education Finance Commission to recommend to the State Board of Education by July 1, 985 areas for school and school district consolidation to be brought into effect by the board on July 1, 1986. A Commission on Teacher and Administrator Education, Certification, and Development was to be created effective July 1, 1983 to create certification standards for educators and recommend policies to the Board of Education. The law also required that each school district create professional development program to be administered to all teachers as part of their requirements for certification. First-year teachers and administrators were to be awarded certification on a provisional basis before being permanently certified following observations and evaluations at the end of the year. (Note: Under this system, a teacher or administrator could be allowed two additional years to meet certification requirements.) A School Executive Management Institute for the training of school administrators was to be operational on July 1, 1984.

=== Funding ===
Funding for the reform act was provided by the diverting of five percent of the budgets of all other state agencies towards education as well as an increase in the state sales tax from five percent to 5.5 percent beginning January 1, 1984. Also effective beginning January 1 was the creation of new individual and corporate income tax brackets. Under the original scheme, the first $5,000 in taxable income produced by an individual or corporate entity was taxed at three percent, and all additional income was taxed at four percent. As per the new law, all reported incomes beyond the initial $10,000 would be taxed at five percent. The funding provisions, projected to bring in about $110 million in additional revenue, amounted to the largest single tax increase in Mississippi's history.

== Aftermath ==
=== Effects on education ===
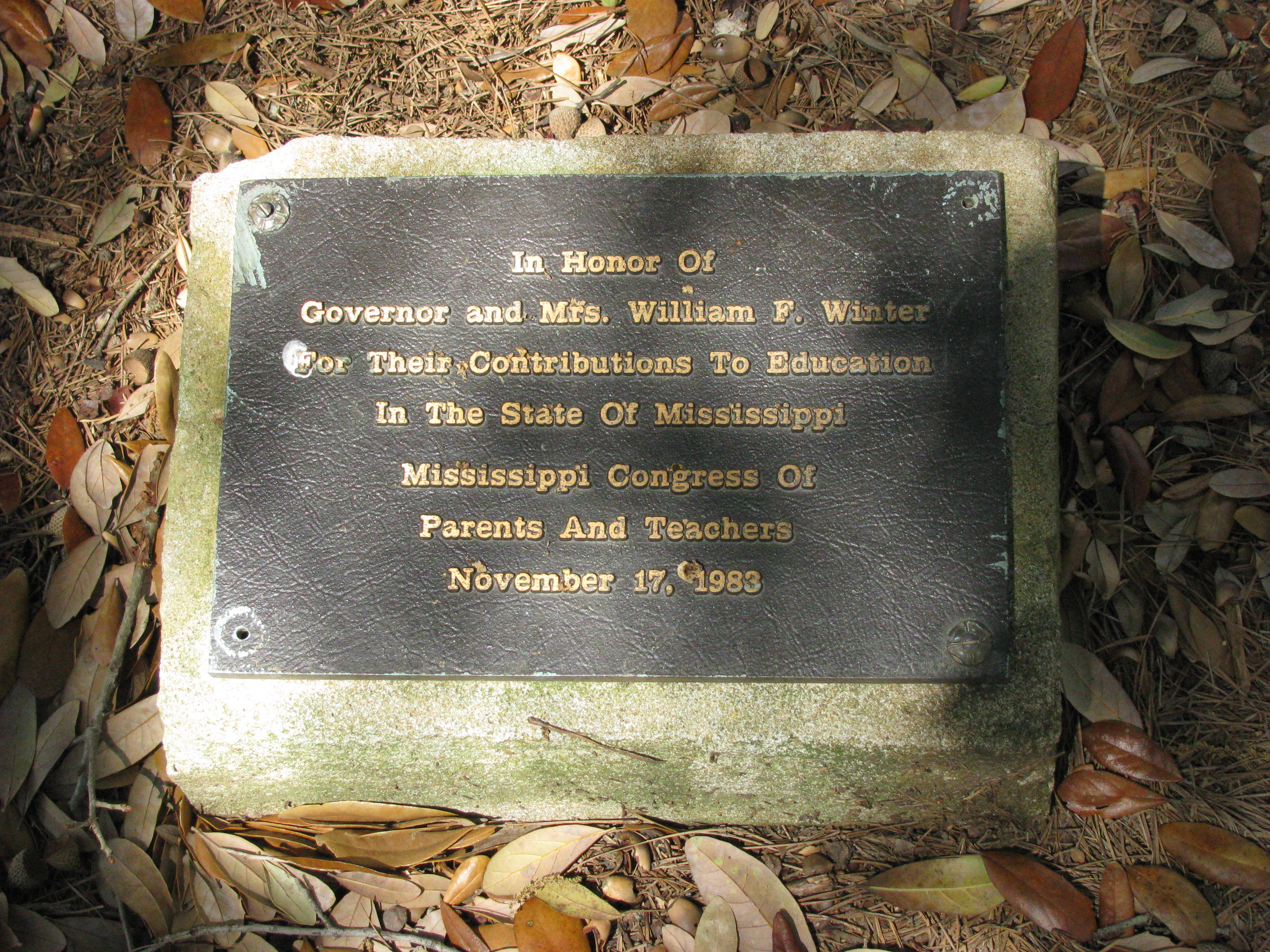
Plaque at the Mississippi State Capitol honoring Winter's and his wife's contributions to public education

A 2002 study published by the Mississippi Department of Education found that education metrics in the state had substantially improved after 1982.

=== Political impact ===
Winter received substantial praise in the national media and from Democratic leaders for his success in pushing through the reforms. He became broadly remembered in Mississippi as its "education governor" for his support for education reform. Historian David Sansing wrote that the passage of the law is what Winter "will be most remembered for".

The special session leading to the passage of the Education Reform Act provoked renewed public interest in the Mississippi Legislature, leading to several newcomers launching bids for office in the state's 1983 legislative elections. Mississippi First, a political group in favor of education and governmental reform, recruited candidates to challenge incumbent legislators who had voted against the Education Reform Act. Senator Bodron lost reelection, as did longtime legislative incumbents Stone Barefield, Son Rhodes, Kenneth Williams, Bob Ferguson, Jim Neal, Algie Davis, and Tommy Horne. John Grisham was inspired by the events leading to the passage of the Education Reform Act to launch his own bid for office and was successfully elected to the Mississippi House of Representatives.

== Works cited ==
- Bolton, Charles C. (2013). William F. Winter and the New Mississippi: A Biography. Jackson: University Press of Mississippi. ISBN 978-1-61703-787-0.
- Nash, Jere; Taggart, Andy (2009). Mississippi Politics: The Struggle for Power, 1976-2008 (second ed.). University Press of Mississippi. ISBN 9781604733570.
