= Mississippi State Treasurer =

Mississippian political position

State Treasurer of Mississippi

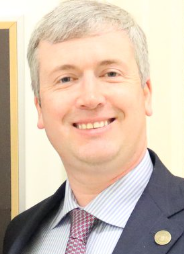
- Incumbent; David McRae since January 9, 2020
- Seat: Jackson, Mississippi
- Term length: Four years
- Constituting instrument: Constitution of Mississippi
- Formation: 1817; 209 years ago
- Salary: US$90,000

State Treasurer of Mississippi is a post created in 1817 when the state was admitted to the Union. Before the state was formed by splitting the Alabama Territory from the Mississippi Territory, an equivalent post was the Territorial Treasurer General, established in 1802.

== History ==
The position of state treasurer was enumerated as part of the executive branch in Mississippi's first constitution in 1817. The office was filled by the choice of the Mississippi Legislature. The first treasurer, Samuel Brooks, was elected on December 19, 1817. The 1832 constitution stipulated that the treasurer was to be popularly elected to serve a two-year term. The 1869 constitution expanded the officer's term to four years.

== Powers, responsibilities, and structure ==
Under Article 5, Section 134, of the Mississippi Constitution, the state treasurer is elected every four years. Candidates for the office must meet the same constitutional qualifications as candidates for the position of secretary of state; they must be at least 25 years old and have lived in the state for at least five years. The office holder is not subject to term limits. Most of the treasurer's duties are determined by state statute.

The treasurer is responsible for keeping certain financial records for the state, including receipts, deposits, and disbursement of money from the state treasury. The constitution requires the treasurer to review and approve all contracts for the provision of "stationery, printing, paper, and fuel" for state agencies and the legislature. They also oversee public bond issues. The treasurer is ex officio the treasurer of the Mississippi Employment Security Commission and chair of the College Savings Plan of Mississippi Board. They are also ex officio a member of several other state boards, including the State Bond Commission, Public Employees Retirement Board, Mississippi Business Finance Corporation, Mississippi Development Bank, License Tag Commission, Tort Claims Board, Mississippi Windstorm Underwriting Association Board, Mississippi Guaranty Pool Board, Economic Development Strategic Planning Task Force, State Prison Emergency and management board, and the Historic Properties Trust Fund Advisory Committee.

The treasurer's salary is $90,000 per year, but is set to increase to $120,000 annually in 2024.

== List of treasurers ==
=== Territorial Treasurers General ===
Territorial Treasurers General
| No. | Territorial Treasurers General | Term in office | Party | Source |
|---|---|---|---|---|
| 1 | Abner Green | 1802 – 1807 | | |
| 2 | Samuel Brooks | 1807 – 1817 | | |

=== State Treasurers ===
State Treasurer
| No. | State Treasurer | Term in office | Party | Source |
|---|---|---|---|---|
| 1 | Samuel Brooks | 1817 – 1818 | | |
| 2 | Peter Schuyler | 1818 – 1821 | | |
| 3 | Samuel C. Wooldridge | 1821 – 1828 | | |
| 4 | James Phillips Jr. | 1828 – 1836 | | |
| 5 | Charles C. Mayson | 1836 – 1838 | | |
| 6 | James Phillips Jr. | 1838 | | |
| 7 | J. A. Vanhoesen | 1838 – 1839 | | |
| 8 | Silas Bowen | 1839 | | |
| 9 | S. Craig | 1839 | | |
| 10 | James G. Williams | 1839 – 1840 | | |
| 11 | Joshua S. Curtis | 1840 – 1841 | | |
| 12 | Richard S. Graves | 1841 – 1843 | | |
| 13 | William Clark | 1843 – 1847 | | |
| 14 | Richard Griffith | 1847 – 1851 | | |
| 15 | William Clark | 1851 – 1854 | | |
| 16 | Shields L. Hussey | 1854 – 1860 | | |
| 17 | Malcolm Decater Haynes | 1860 – 1865 | | |
| 18 | W. B. Weaver | 1865 | | |
| 19 | John H. Echols | 1865 – 1869 | | |
| 20 | William H. Vassar | 1869 – 1874 | | |
| 21 | G. H. Holland | 1874 – 1875 | Republican | |
| 22 | M. L. Holland | 1875 | | |
| 23 | William L. Hemingway | 1875 – 1890 | | |
| 24 | J. J. Evans | 1890 – 1896 | | |
| 25 | A. Q. May | 1896 – 1900 | | |
| 26 | J. R. Stowers | 1900 – 1901 | Democratic | |
| 27 | George W. Carlisle | 1901 – 1902 | | |
| 28 | Thad B. Lampton | 1902 – 1904 | | |
| 29 | William Jones Miller | 1904 – January 20, 1908 | Democratic | |
| 30 | George Robert Edwards | January 20, 1908 – January 15, 1912 | Democratic | |
| 31 | Peter Simpson Stovall | January 15, 1912 – January 17, 1916 | Democratic | |
| 32 | John Peroutt Taylor | January 17, 1916 – January 19, 1920 | Democratic | |
| 33 | Larkin Seymour Rogers | January 20, 1920 – October 18, 1920 | Democratic | |
| 34 | William Moseley Murry | October 18, 1920 – January 19, 1924 | Democratic | |
| 35 | Ben Shem Lowry | January 21, 1924 – January 16, 1928 | Democratic | |
| 36 | Webb Walley | January 16, 1928 – 1932 | Democratic | |
| 37 | Lewis S. May | 1932 – 1936 | | |
| 38 | Newton James | 1936 – 1940 | | |
| 39 | Lewis S. May | 1940 – 1944 | | |
| 40 | Newton James | 1944 – 1948 | | |
| 41 | R. W. May | 1948 – 1952 | | |
| 42 | Newton James | 1952 – 1956 | | |
| 43 | Robert D. Morrow Sr. | 1956 – 1960 | | |
| 44 | Evelyn Gandy | 1960 – 1964 | Democratic | |
| 45 | William Winter | 1964 – 1968 | Democratic | |
| 46 | Evelyn Gandy | 1968 – 1972 | Democratic | |
| 47 | Brad Dye | 1972 – 1976 | Democratic | |
| 48 | Ed Pittman | 1976 – 1980 | Democratic | |
| 49 | John L. Dale | 1980 – 1980 | Democratic | |
| 50 | Bill Cole | 1980 – 1988 | Democratic | |
| 51 | Marshall Bennett | 1988 – 2003 | Democratic | |
| 52 | Peyton Prospere | 2003 – 2004 | Democratic | |
| 53 | Tate Reeves | 2004 – 2012 | Republican | |
| 54 | Lynn Fitch | January 5, 2012 – January 14, 2020 | Republican | |
| 55 | David McRae | January 14, 2020 – present | Republican | |

== Works cited ==
- Busbee, Westley F. Jr. (2014). Mississippi: A History (second ed.). John Wiley & Sons. ISBN 9781118755921.
- History, Mississippi Dept of Archives and (1924). The Official and Statistical Register of the State of Mississippi. Department of Archives and History.
- Mississippi Official and Statistical Register 2020–2024. Jackson: Mississippi Secretary of State. 2021. OCLC 1353823876.
- Rowland, Dunbar, ed. (1904). The Official and Statistical Register of the State of Mississippi. Jackson: Mississippi Department of Archives and History. OCLC 777030828.
- Winkle, John W. III (2014). The Mississippi State Constitution (second ed.). Oxford University Press. ISBN 9780199300631.
