= Sonny Merideth =

American lawyer and politician

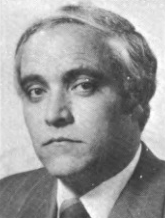
Sonny Merideth, c. 1973

Horace Lavelle "Sonny" Merideth Jr. (December 7, 1930 – September 5, 2017) was an American lawyer and politician.

== Early life ==
Horace Lavelle "Sonny" Merideth Jr. was born on December 7, 1930, in Swiftwater, Mississippi to H. L. Merideth Sr. and Cassel Boatright Merideth. He was raised in James. He graduated from Riverside Consolidated High School in Washington County in 1948 and received an undergraduate degree in accounting from Mississippi State University four years later.

== Political career ==
In 1959 Merideth won election to the Mississippi House of Representatives, where he served from 1960 to 1992. He served as a floor leader on behalf of Buddie Newman when the latter served as speaker of the house and was one of his staunchest supporters. He chaired the House Ways and Means Committee from 1980 to 1988. Upon Newman's replacement by Tim Ford in January 1988, Merideth was removed from the chair of the Ways and Means Committee and instead made chairman of the County Affairs Committee.

=== Education Reform Act of 1982 ===
In 1982 Mississippi Governor William F. Winter called for an expansion in public education programs and spending, to be funded by tax increases, specifically on the oil and gas severance tax. Merideth opposed any tax hike and also thought that should taxes be raised the revenue should be diverted to existing programs. The governor called the legislature into a special session, scheduled for December 6, to consider his education proposals. Merideth responded by encouraging his colleagues to pass a resolution thanking the governor for his concern, assuring him that the matter would be addressed in regular session, and then adjourning. He also stated that such proposals required more time than available in a special session to fully consider. In an attempt to ease the situation, Winter called a meeting with Merideth in his capacity as chairman of the Ways and Means committee and his Senate counterpart, finance chairman Ellis B. Bodron. The governor told them that he would abandon the severance tax increase and back any other revenue source that the legislators preferred. Legislative leadership then held a meeting and decided not to move to adjourn early, and Meredith began preparing for his committee to work on the proposals. Though he still preferred adjournment, Speaker Newman advised him that the House was going to fully consider the proposals. Resolved that his committee was now obligated to fulfill its function, Meredith agreed to secure funding for whatever proposals were approved by the House's education committee. The education committee eventually produced an educational reform bill which included provisions for the creation of public kindergartens and pay raises for teachers, which Merideth's committee funded before it was passed by the full House. A complementary bill was passed by the Senate, and Merideth served on the conference committee tasked with resolving the differences between the two bills. The committee agreed on a bill that included the kindergartens and pay increases plus reading aides for the first three school grades and new school administrator training programs, to be funded by a $110 million increase in sales and income taxes. The bill was passed by the legislature and signed into law on December 21.

=== 1985 teacher strike ===
In early 1985, public school teachers in Mississippi began lobbying for salary increases. In February, the Mississippi Association of Educators voted to strike, and by mid-March almost 9,000 teachers were refusing to work. The legislature responded by passing a three-year pay increase plan with a provision added by Merideth which made striking as a public employee a criminal offense.

=== 1987 highway program ===
Towards the end of a 1986 special session, a transportation lobby group and the state's highway commissioners drafted a plan to greatly expand the number of the state's four-lane highways, dubbed Advocating Highways for Economic Advancement and Development (AHEAD), financed by a five-cent increase on fuel-per-gallon taxes. Legislators introduced the bill at the open of their 1987 session, but Governor Bill Allain proposed his own program the following day, which included four-lane highway construction, a reorganization of the highway department, and scrapped the tax hike. AHEAD supporters ignored Allain's proposal, and were able to pass their program on January 29, but without the requisite three-fifths majority constitutionally required to approve tax increases. Merideth, anticipating the initial failure, worked with other AHEAD supporters to persuade those who had voted the bill down to change their minds. This effort succeeded and the bill was also approved by the Senate. Allain vetoed the bill, but the legislature overrode it.

=== Gambling ===
In the 1980s, officials from the Mississippi Gulf Coast region explored the possibility of using gambling ships to promote tourism. Gambling was illegal in Mississippi's jurisdiction, but the proposal entailed allowing a ship to pick up passengers in port and then sail into federal waters, which were typically defined as three miles off of the coast. A plan was hatched in 1987 to have one such ship, the Europa Star, sail out of Biloxi to attempt the scheme, but the plan was delayed after lawyers noted that the Mississippi–Alabama barrier islands hemming in the Mississippi Sound expanded the jurisdiction of the state so that the ship would have to sail even further—an unprofitable distance—to skirt the gambling restrictions. In January 1988 Representative Glenn Endris and other Gulf Coast legislators filed a bill in the House to legalize gambling in the sound. Merideth chaired the subcommittee which handled gambling bills and asked Endris, "You want a dog and pony show or you want me to just go ahead and kill 'em?" After Endris assured him that the effort was genuine, Merideth said, "Hell, let's go to work." The bill passed the House before dying in the Senate finance committee due to moral objections from religious leaders. In March 1989 legislation authorizing gambling in the sound was reintroduced in the Senate. Merideth advised passing it before the following Sunday to prevent Christian preachers from rallying their congregations to their cause during their Sunday worship services. The bill was successfully passed in a few days.

In January 1990 Tommy Gollott and several other senators introduced a bill to legalize riverboat casino operations along the Mississippi River to improve the economic situation of areas along the watercourse. The bill passed the Senate by a slim margin and was forwarded to the House and assigned to Merideth's subcommittee. The bill authorized gambling on ships "underway making way". Merideth, representing the river city of Greenville, feared that this would be practically unworkable, due to the crowded and difficult nature of navigating the river, and due to the fact that turning around in the river would lead ships to cross into Arkansas and Louisiana territory, where such activity was illegal. Merideth suggested removing the underway stipulation from the bill to allow docked ships to host casinos. Though fearing that this would make the bill unpopular, Gollott agreed with Merideth, whose subcommittee then struck the language from the bill. Merideth guided the bill's passage through the full House in early March, and it subsequently passed the Senate and became law.

== Later life ==
Upon leaving the legislature, Merideth devoted his time to practicing law. He closed his practice in 1999. After divorcing his first wife, Merideth met Linda Jeffcoat. They married in 2004 and moved to Gulf Breeze, Florida. He died at his home there on September 5, 2017.

== Works cited ==
- Bolton, Charles C. (2013). William F. Winter and the New Mississippi: A Biography. Jackson: University Press of Mississippi. ISBN 978-1-61703-787-0.
- Nash, Jere; Taggart, Andy (2009). Mississippi Politics: The Struggle for Power, 1976-2008 (second ed.). University Press of Mississippi. ISBN 9781604733570.
