= 1984 United States Senate election in Mississippi =

- November 5, 1984
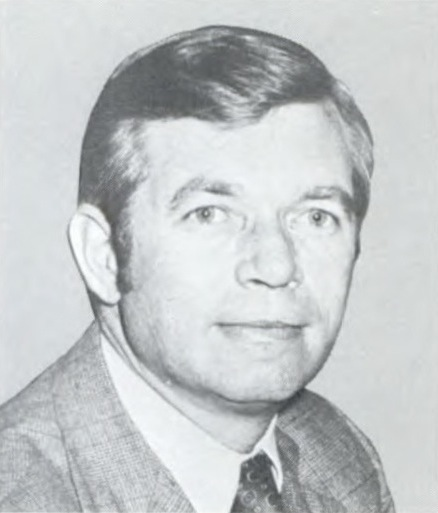

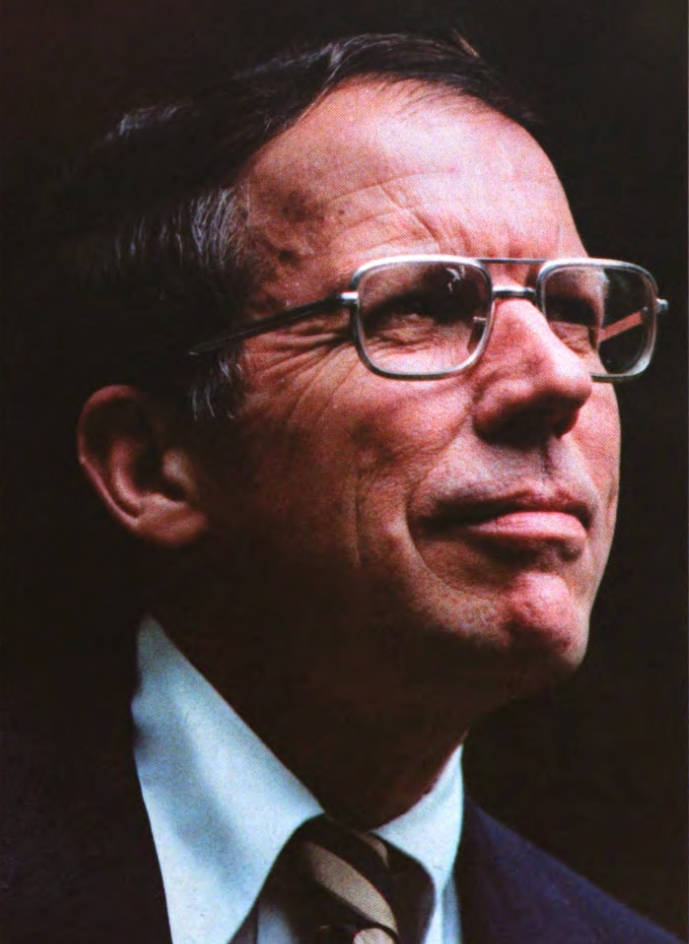
Nominee	Thad Cochran	William F. Winter
Party	Republican	Democratic
Popular vote	580,314	371,926
Percentage	60.94%	39.06%
- County results Cochran: 50–60% 60–70% 70–80% Winter: 50–60% 60–70% 70–80%
U.S. senator before election
Thad Cochran
Republican
Elected U.S. Senator
Thad Cochran
Republican

The 1984 United States Senate election in Mississippi was held on November 5, 1984. Incumbent Republican U.S. Senator Thad Cochran rode the coattails of President Ronald Reagan, who won 49 states in concurrent presidential election, and won re-election to a second term. Cochran was the first Republican ever to be re-elected to the Senate from Mississippi.

== Campaign ==
Secretary of State Dick Molpus stated that voter turnout for the Democratic senatorial primary at 8.1% was the lowest in the state's history since 1950.

Winter received 74% of the black vote.

== Major candidates ==
=== Democratic ===
- William F. Winter, former Governor

=== Republican ===
- Thad Cochran, incumbent U.S. Senator

== Results ==
Mississippi U.S. Senate Election, 1984
Party	Candidate	Votes	%
Republican	Thad Cochran (incumbent)	580,314	60.94%
Democratic	William Winter	371,926	39.06%
Total votes		952,240	100.00%
Republican hold			

== See also ==
- 1984 United States Senate elections

== Works cited ==
- Black, Earl; Black, Merle (1992). The Vital South: How Presidents Are Elected. Harvard University Press. ISBN 0674941306.
