= Perrin H. Purvis =

American politician

Member of the Mississippi State Senate
- In office March 1965 – January 5, 1988
- Preceded by: Noel Monaghan
- Succeeded by: Roger Wicker
- Constituency: 14th district (1965‍–‍1968); 6th district (1968‍–‍1988)

Personal details
- Born: Perrin Hays Purvis; February 24, 1918 Blue Springs, Mississippi, U.S.
- Died: October 30, 2004 (aged 86) Tupelo, Mississippi, U.S.
- Party: Democratic
- Spouse: Helen Foster (died 1996)

Military service
- Branch/service: United States Army; Army Air Forces
- Battles/wars: World War II

Perrin Hays Purvis (February 24, 1918 – October 30, 2004) was an American businessman and Democratic politician. He was a member of the Mississippi State Senate from 1964 to 1988.

== Biography ==
Perrin H. Purvis was born on February 24, 1918, in Blue Springs, Mississippi. He attended the University of Southern Mississippi and served in the U. S. Army Air Corps during World War II. He became a member of the Mississippi State Senate in 1964, and served continuously until 1988. In 1982, he authored an amendment to the Mississippi Education Reform Act of 1982 that provided state government funding for mandatory kindergartens in public schools. He died at his home in Tupelo, Mississippi, on October 30, 2004. He was survived by his daughter and grandchildren.
