= Michael K. Randolph =

American judge (born 1946)

Michael Randolph

Chief Justice of the Mississippi Supreme Court
- Incumbent
- Assumed office January 31, 2019
- Preceded by: Bill Waller Jr.

Justice of the Mississippi Supreme Court
- Incumbent
- Assumed office April 23, 2004
- Appointed by: Haley Barbour
- Preceded by: Edwin L. Pittman

Personal details
- Born: December 4, 1946 (age 79) Dayton, Ohio, U.S.
- Party: Republican
- Spouse: Kathy Webb
- Education: Rollins College (BA); University of Mississippi, Oxford (JD)

Michael K. Randolph (born December 4, 1946) is the chief justice of the Supreme Court of Mississippi, serving in the position since 2019. Before that, he was appointed to the Supreme Court in 2004. He represents District 2 Place 3.

== Early life and education ==
Born in 1946, Randolph is a native of Dayton, Ohio. He is the son of a construction worker who had a third-grade education.

He served as an air traffic controller during the Vietnam War with the U.S. Army 1st Infantry Division and was honorably discharged in 1967.

He attended Ohio State University before graduating from Rollins College with a bachelor of science in business administration in 1972; two years later, he earned a Juris Doctor from the University of Mississippi School of Law. While in law school, he joined the U.S. Naval Reserve, graduated from the Naval Justice School, and serving as an attorney with the Judge Advocate General Corps. He was honorably discharged in 1975.

== Career ==
From 1975 until 2004, Randolph practiced law in Biloxi, Mississippi and Hattiesburg, Mississippi, working for several firms before starting his own practice with two others.

On April 23, 2004, Gov. Haley Barbour appointed Randolph to the Mississippi Supreme Court to serve the unexpired term of former Chief Justice Edwin L. Pittman. In November 2004, Randolph was elected to the Supreme Court for an eight-year term that began January 1, 2005. He was reelected in 2012 and 2020. He became a Presiding Justice of the Supreme Court on January 1, 2013. He became Chief Justice on February 1, 2019.

President Ronald Reagan appointed Randolph to serve on the National Coal Council. Randolph has also served on the board of directors for William Carey College, and was past president of the South Central Mississippi Bar Association. He is the former chairman of the Forrest County Republican Executive Committee.

Randolph was rumored as a potential Republican candidate in the 2019 Mississippi gubernatorial election.

== Personal life ==
Randolph is married to Kathy Webb Randolph. He has three children and five grandchildren. He is a member of Temple Baptist Church.

Legal offices
Preceded by Edwin L. Pittman	Justice of the Mississippi Supreme Court; 2004–present	Incumbent
Preceded by William L. Waller Jr.	Chief Justice of Mississippi Supreme Court; 2019–present	Incumbent
