= William Aylmer Winter =

American politician

Member of the Mississippi Senate from the 28th district
- In office January 1940 – January 1944
- In office January 1932 – January 1936
- In office January 1924 – January 1928

Member of the Mississippi House of Representatives from the Montgomery-Grenada counties district
- In office January 1944 – January 1948

Member of the Mississippi House of Representatives from the Grenada County district
- In office January 1916 – January 1924

Personal details
- Born: March 22, 1872 Grenada County, MS
- Died: March 12, 1952 (aged 79)
- Party: Democrat
- Children: William Forrest Winter

William Aylmer Winter (March 22, 1872 - March 12, 1952) was a farmer and a Democratic Mississippi state legislator from Grenada County in the early-to-mid 20th century. He was also the father of the Mississippi governor William Forrest Winter.

== Early life ==
William Aylmer Winter was born on March 22, 1872, in Grenada County, Mississippi. He was the son of William Brown Winter and Amelia (Fisher) Winter. He went to the private and public schools of Grenada and Tallahatchie counties. He graduated from the Iuka Normal Institute with an A. B. in 1891. He was a farmer.

== Political career ==
Winter was elected to represent Grenada County in the Mississippi House of Representatives as a Democrat for the first time in 1915 for the 1916-1920 term. He was re-elected in 1919 and served in the 1920-1924 term. He then was in the Mississippi Senate, representing the 28th district, from 1924 to 1928, from 1932 to 1936, and from 1940 to 1944. Finally, he was a member of the Mississippi House of Representatives, representing Montgomery and Grenada counties as a floater representative.

== Later life ==
Winter died on March 12, 1952.

== Personal life ==
Winter was a Presbyterian. He married schoolteacher Inez Parker on March 2, 1921, in Memphis, Tennessee. Their son and only child, William Forrest Winter, became the governor of Mississippi from 1980 to 1984.
