= William J. Cole =

American politician

State Treasurer of Mississippi
- In office December 19, 1980 – January 7, 1988
- Preceded by: John L. Dale
- Succeeded by: Marshall G. Bennett

Personal details
- Born: June 24, 1948
- Died: April 11, 2003 (aged 54) Jackson, Mississippi
- Party: Democratic Party

William J. Cole III (June 24, 1948 - April 11, 2003) was an American politician and lawyer who served as the State Treasurer of Mississippi from 1980 to 1988.

== Early life ==
Cole was born on June 24, 1948, and raised in Wayne County, Mississippi. He graduated from the University of Mississippi School of Law in 1974.

== Political career ==
Cole was a member of the Democratic Party. In 1971 he helped organized youth in support of William F. Winter's lieutenant gubernatorial campaign. In January 1979 Cole convinced Winter to pay for his name to be added to a poll being conducted to gauge Mississippians' attitudes towards public figures. Cole reported that the results were favorable to Winter, which in part convinced him to mount a successful gubernatorial campaign that year. Cole served as one of Winter's campaign strategists. After Winter became governor in 1980, Cole became his chief of staff.

In December 1980 State Treasurer of Mississippi John Dale died. Winter, who was empowered to appoint an interim treasurer, asked Cole if he would like the post. Though surprised, Cole accepted the offer. He was sworn in to the treasurer's office on December 19. He was succeeded by Marshall G. Bennett on January 7, 1988.

In 1988 Governor Ray Mabus appointed him chairman of the State Economic Development Task Force.

== Later life ==
After leaving the treasurer's office, Cole began practicing law, specializing in public finance, municipal bonds, and environmental law. In 2002 he was qualified to practice law before the United States Supreme Court. Cole died on April 11, 2003, at Mississippi Baptist Medical Center in Jackson, succumbing to complications following a heart attack. A funeral was held three days later and he was buried at Parkway Memorial Cemetery in Ridgeland.

== Works cited ==
- Bolton, Charles C. (2013). William F. Winter and the New Mississippi: A Biography. Jackson: University Press of Mississippi. ISBN 978-1-61703-787-0.
- Nash, Jere; Taggart, Andy (2009). Mississippi Politics: The Struggle for Power, 1976-2008 (second ed.). University Press of Mississippi. ISBN 9781604733570.
