= Ellis B. Bodron =

American politician (1923–1997)

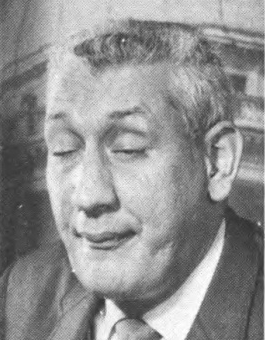
- Bodron c. 1973

Member of the Mississippi Senate from the 24th district
- In office January 1952 – January 1984

Member of the Mississippi House of Representatives from the Warren County district
- In office January 1948 – January 1952

Personal details
- Born: October 25, 1923 Vicksburg, Mississippi
- Died: February 17, 1997 (aged 73) Jackson, Mississippi
- Party: Democratic

Ellis Barkett Bodron (October 25, 1923 - February 17, 1997) was an American lawyer and Democratic Party politician who served in the Mississippi State Senate from 1952 to 1984 and in the Mississippi House of Representatives from 1948 to 1952. He was blind.

== Early life ==
Ellis Barkett Bodron was born on October 25, 1923, in Vicksburg, Mississippi. He became blind as a child. He was a lawyer.

== Political career ==
He represented Warren County, Mississippi, in the Mississippi House of Representatives from 1948 to 1952. He then was a member of the Mississippi State Senate from 1952 until he lost a re-election bid in 1984.

In 1972, Bodron ran as the Democratic nominee for the 4th district congressional seat. In the general election he faced Republican Thad Cochran and black independent Eddie McBride. McBride had been recruited by Mayor of Fayette Charles Evers, who was bitter that Bodron had blocked an initiative to build a nursing home in his town. With McBridge peeling away black votes and Cochran benefitting from a strong coattail effect from Richard Nixon's presidential candidacy, Cochran won the race with a plurality of 48 percent of the vote.

=== Education Reform Act of 1982 and aftermath ===
In 1982 Mississippi Governor William F. Winter called for an expansion in public education programs and spending, to be funded by tax increases, specifically on the oil and gas severance tax. The governor called the legislature into special session, scheduled for December 6, to consider his education proposals. Bodron opposed a special session and declared that he would not call any meetings of the Senate Finance Committee, which would prevent any revenue being appropriated. In an attempt to ease the situation, Winter called a meeting with Bodron and his House counterpart, Ways and Means Committee chairman Sonny Merideth. The governor told them that he would abandon the severance tax increase and back any other revenue source that the legislators preferred. Legislative leadership then held a meeting and decided not to move to adjourn early and move forward with the session. The day the session opened, Bodron remained adamant that his committee would not consider any tax legislation. The House eventually produced an educational reform bill which included provisions for the creation of public kindergartens and pay raises for teachers. Winter met with Bodron to try and earn his support, but the senator continued to argue that education reform was expensive and unnecessary.

Lieutenant Governor Brad Dye feared that Bodron would prevent the package from passing the Senate and called him the night the House passed the bill. Dye told him, "Ellis, what you do with your politics is fine, but in running your mouth, you've hurt my politics. I want you to add some Senate things to the House bill." When Bodron asked for clarification, Dye told him "I want a commitment out of you right now—that this bill is going to come out of Finance Committee and you'll support it. If you're not, this is going to be the first time the Education Committee has ever raised taxes in this state." The Finance Committee stripped kindergartens from the bill, but Bodron broke a tie vote to prevent the rest of the legislation from being quashed in the committee. Despite this, he remained critical of reform supporters, accusing the governor's staff of "stirring up a tremendous amount of emotion" and denouncing them as the "Boys of Spring". The full Senate returned provisions for kindergartens to the bill and passed the final product overwhelmingly. Bodron served on the conference committee tasked with resolving the differences between the House and Senate bills. The committee agreed on a package that included the kindergartens and pay increases plus reading aides for the first three school grades and new school administrator training programs, to be funded by a $110 million increase in sales and income taxes. The bill was passed by the legislature and signed into law on December 21.

Winter's education accomplishments sparked a decade of political interest in reforming state government and led to like-minded candidates seeking elective office. Bodron was challenged by a former intern, Ken Harper, in the Democratic primary for his Senate seat. Bodron lost the August election, garnering 6,816 votes to his opponent's 7,845. Several other incumbent legislators viewed as opponents to education reform were also defeated in the 1983 elections.

== Later life ==
In 1991 President George H. W. Bush appointed him to the Council Association of Americans with Disabilities, where he served until 1996. He died of brain cancer on February 17, 1997, in Jackson, Mississippi.

== Works cited ==
- Bolton, Charles C. (2013). William F. Winter and the New Mississippi: A Biography. Jackson: University Press of Mississippi. ISBN 978-1-61703-787-0.
- Nash, Jere; Taggart, Andy (2009). Mississippi Politics: The Struggle for Power, 1976-2008 (second ed.). University Press of Mississippi. ISBN 9781604733570.
