= John W. Randolph =

American politician

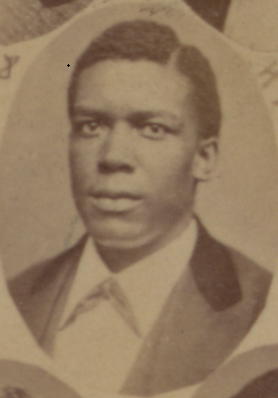

Member of the Mississippi House of Representatives
- In office 1874–1875

Personal details
- Party: Republican
- Profession: Politician

John W. Randolph was a state legislator in Mississippi. He represented Sunflower County and Leflore County in the Mississippi House of Representatives 1874 and 1875. In 1875, he was chosen to serve as the circuit and chancery clerk in Sunflower County. Up until the early 1900s, he attended Republican political conventions.

He was appointed to succeed G. W. Bowles on the chancery court.

== See also ==
- African American officeholders from the end of the Civil War until before 1900
