= William F. Winter =

American attorney and politician (1923–2020)

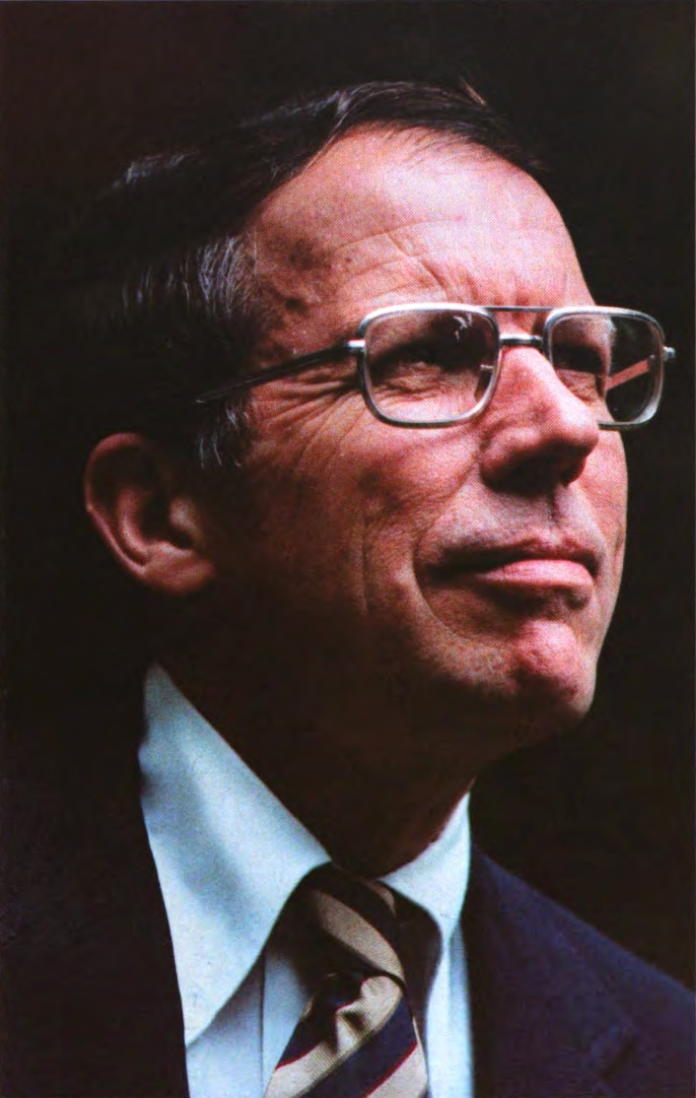
- Winter in 1981

58th Governor of Mississippi
- In office January 22, 1980 – January 10, 1984
- Lieutenant: Brad Dye
- Preceded by: Cliff Finch
- Succeeded by: William Allain

25th Lieutenant Governor of Mississippi
- In office January 17, 1972 – January 14, 1976
- Governor: Bill Waller
- Preceded by: Charles Sullivan
- Succeeded by: Evelyn Gandy

Treasurer of Mississippi
- In office 1964–1968
- Governor: Paul B. Johnson Jr.
- Preceded by: Evelyn Gandy
- Succeeded by: Evelyn Gandy

Mississippi State Tax Collector
- In office April 1956 – January 1964
- Preceded by: Nellah Massey Bailey
- Succeeded by: Office abolished

Member of the Mississippi House of Representatives from Grenada County
- In office January 1948 – 1956

Personal details
- Born: William Forrest Winter; February 21, 1923 Grenada, Mississippi, U.S.
- Died: December 18, 2020 (aged 97) Jackson, Mississippi, U.S.
- Party: Democratic
- Spouse: Elise Varner
- Children: 3
- Parent: William Aylmer Winter (father)
- Education: University of Mississippi, Oxford (BA, LLB)

Military service
- Allegiance: United States
- Branch/service: United States Army
- Years of service: 1943–1946, 1951–1957
- Rank: Major
- Unit: Mississippi Army National Guard

William Forrest Winter (February 21, 1923 – December 18, 2020) was an American attorney and politician who served as the 58th governor of Mississippi from 1980 to 1984. A member of the Democratic Party, he also served as the lieutenant governor, state treasurer, state tax collector, and as a member of the Mississippi House of Representatives.

Born the son of a legislator and school teacher in Grenada, Mississippi, Winter was educated at the University of Mississippi. He enlisted in the United States Army after graduation and assumed responsibility for training troops before being posted to the Philippines. Upon his return to the United States, Winter enrolled in law school and became increasingly involved in politics, winning election to the Mississippi House of Representatives in 1947. Re-elected twice, he supported bills aimed at governmental reform. Following an unsuccessful bid to become Speaker of the House, in April 1956 he was appointed to the lucrative post of state tax collector. Feeling the office was wasteful, he convinced the legislature to abolish it and was elected state treasurer in 1963. He also became the chair of the board of trustees of the Mississippi Department of Archives and History in 1969, which he served as until 2007.

Winter launched an unsuccessful campaign in the 1967 gubernatorial election. He was elected as lieutenant governor in 1971, and made another unsuccessful bid to become governor in 1975. He was elected to the governorship in the 1979 election, and during his tenure he supported civil service protections for state employees, reformed the judicial appointment process, removed racial considerations from state hiring process, and dealt with continuous budget deficits. Mostly focused on education reform, he pushed the 1982 Education Reform Act through the legislature, which increased spending on public education and established public kindergartens. Winter unsuccessfully ran for a seat in the United States Senate in the 1984 election. Later in his life he taught at the Harvard Institute of Politics, co-chaired Bill Clinton's presidential campaigns in the 1992 and 1996 elections, co-chaired Clinton's Advisory Board on Race, and supported altering the flag of Mississippi.

== Early life ==
=== Upbringing and education ===
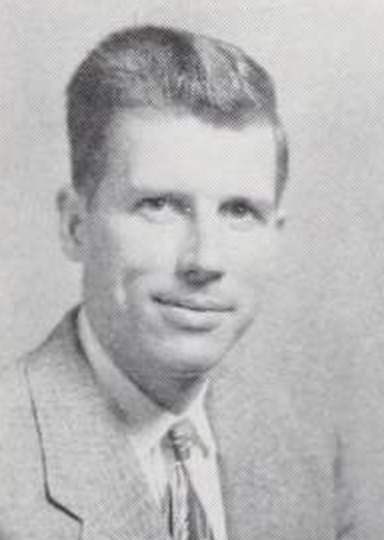
Winter at the University of Mississippi, c. 1949

William Forrest Winter was born on February 21, 1923, in Grenada, Mississippi, United States as the son of Mississippi state legislator and cotton broker William Aylmer Winter and school teacher Inez Parker. His grandfather, William H. Winter, suggested that he be given the middle name Forrest after Confederate General Nathan Bedford Forrest. Almyer Winter was a successful farmer, and amassed around 1,500 acres of land in Grenada County, Mississippi. By the 1930s, the Winters had about a dozen tenant and sharecropping families, most of them black. Almyer had a reputation as a fair landlord and, despite Jim Crow racial segregation, was viewed as friendly by the local black families.

William F. Winter's mother homeschooled him for his first year of education, and he was later educated at the one-room white Kincannon School on the family property after she was hired by the county government to teach there. Beginning in 1930, Granada County he and other white children in the county were bused into the city of Grenada to attend its more modern school. Winter excelled as a student and served as class president in his senior year of high school, graduating as valedictorian in May 1940.

Winter attended the University of Mississippi. As an undergraduate, he was an active member of the Phi Delta Theta fraternity; Phi Eta Sigma, a scholarly fraternity; and the International Relations Club. He was elected president of the Hermean Literary Society during his junior year. In the summer of 1942 he worked as a driver for James Eastland's successful United States Senate campaign. He graduated in September 1943. He enrolled in the University of Mississippi School of Law in the fall of 1946 after serving in United States Army. While there he was elected president of the Omicron Delta Kappa leadership fraternity and chaired its speaker's forum. He also chaired a history club and was elected freshman class president, though his bid to become the law school's student body president failed. From 1948 to 1949 he served as editor-in-chief of the Mississippi Law Journal. He graduated in May 1949 with the Phi Delta Phi Award.

=== Military service ===
Immediately after receiving his undergraduate degree, Winter and several of his classmates enlisted in the army with the hopes of fighting in World War II. He was assigned to the 65th Infantry Regiment and went to Camp Blanding, Florida for basic training. He performed well and after six weeks was made acting corporal of a squad. At the end of basic training he and other University of Mississippi alumni were posted to Oxford, Mississippi, to participate in the Army Specialist Training Program. Shortly after the Normandy landings, he was accepted into a class at the Officer Candidate School at Fort Benning, Georgia.

Winter graduated first in his officer training class, becoming a second lieutenant. Thereafter he was assigned to the Infantry Replacement Training Center at Fort McClellan, Alabama and was tasked with commanding a platoon of the First Regiment, an all-black, white-officered unit undergoing basic training. The army officially maintained a policy of racial nondiscrimination, and while Winter was generally successful in following these instructions, he tended to have more difficulty commanding northern blacks resentful of orders from a southern white. He did well as an instructor, but was dismayed that he was not seeing conflict and that there was a strong likelihood the black troops he commanded would only be assigned to noncombat roles. Over time, he gradually befriended a few of his black comrades, and began to consider "how unreal was the world in which I had grown up, the segregated world."

By the time Winter was up for reassignment in the summer of 1945, the war had ended. In late September, he was sent to the Philippines and, upon arrival, attached to the 24th Replacement Depot. Shortly thereafter he was made assistant aide de camp to Major General Frederick Elwood Uhl in Manila. At his request, he was reassigned to the 86th Infantry Division. In this capacity he was responsible for assisting efforts to keep the troops occupied and to reestablish communication and transportation networks. As the army began demobilizing its forces in early 1946, Winter became responsible for managing soldiers' departure. He returned to the United States two weeks after Philippine independence was granted on July 4, 1946. He left his first stint in the army still supporting white supremacy, but having been around black soldiers, was increasingly doubtful of the merits of Jim Crow segregation.

In June 1951 Winter was called upon by the government to return to active duty, due to the outbreak of the Korean War. He was stationed at Fort Jackson, South Carolina, where he attended to courts-martial and trained a support regiment. Upon hearing of his father suffering a heart attack in October 1951, he applied for a hardship discharge, which was granted two months later. With the elder Winter's health in decline, he took over most responsibilities for managing the family farm in Grenada County. Winter joined the 31st Infantry Division of the Mississippi National Guard in 1953, where he served until his retirement with the rank of major in 1957.

== Early political involvement ==
=== Early interest ===
When he was eight years old, Winter accompanied his father to the Mississippi State Senate in Jackson and watched debates on the Senate floor. They also attended the inauguration of Governor Martin Sennet Conner and met the governor the following day. The trip made an impression on him and piqued his interest in politics. By the time he was in high school he had open ambitions to become an elected official. Unlike his father, Winter supported President Franklin D. Roosevelt's New Deal platform and saw the president's actions as proof "that politics is a worthy profession". While stationed in the Philippines, he wrote to his father to discuss his chances at having a political career.

=== Legislative career ===
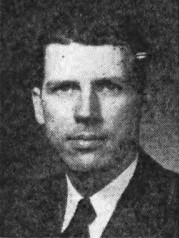
Winter as a state representative, ca. 1949

After completing his first year in law school, Winter returned to his family's home in the summer of 1947 to launch his campaign for a seat in the Mississippi House of Representatives, which was then held by Ed McCormick. He campaigned mostly by printing handbills, visiting homes, and delivering a few speeches. He also became acquainted with Judge John C. Stennis. Winter won the Democratic primary against McCormick, 2,160 votes to 597 and won in the general election. That year U.S. Senator Theodore Bilbo died and Stennis campaigned to replace him in the special election. Winter led a university student "Stennis for Senate" group and actively campaigned for the judge. Stennis won and became lifelong friends with Winter.

Winter was seated in the legislature in January 1948. For the duration of his tenure he lodged at the Edwards Hotel and wrote a political column for the Grenada County Weekly. His father offered him frequent advice on legislative matters and political etiquette. Probably owing in-part to his father's influence, Speaker of the House Walter Sillers Jr. appointed him to several key committees, including Ways and Means, Agriculture, Military Affairs, and one of the Judiciary Committees. He was also made chairman of the Interstate Cooperation Committee, which did little business. Winter and some of his other young freshmen contemporaries sought to use their new positions to push through reforms for the state, though this position placed them in opposition to Siller's conservative leadership of the House. In his first year Winter pursued penal reform, writing a successful bill to separate juvenile and adult inmates at the Mississippi State Penitentiary and backing another measure which required the prison to hire outside guards instead of relying solely on trusties. He worked with three other freshmen to pass a workers' compensation law and supported a relaxation of the state's blue law and an unsuccessful attempt to allow local option consideration of alcohol prohibition.

At the time Winter took office, the state was in the throes of the Southern Dixiecrat breakaway from the national Democratic Party over President Harry Truman's consideration of civil rights proposals for blacks. Winter joined most of the legislators in supporting motions to denounce federal civil rights measures. He also supported the holding of a referendum to add a "good moral character" test for voting procedures to the state constitution, which was widely viewed as a mechanic to be used to further disenfranchise blacks. The legislature scheduled the referendum, but the proposal was defeated by the public, who feared its potentially broader implications. Outside of the legislature he generally avoided Dixiecrat activities and did not attend the state's Democratic convention in June 1948 despite being a delegate. He also wrote an analysis of litigation concerning the United States Supreme Court's decision in Smith v. Allwright for the Mississippi Law Journal, in which he concluded that "any attempt through party machinery, unfettered by statutory provisions, to keep negroes from voting will be declared by the federal courts [...] a violation of the Fourteenth and Fifteenth Amendments. He voted for the Dixiecrat candidates, Strom Thurmond and Fielding L. Wright in the 1948 United States presidential election, mostly as a gesture of loyalty to Wright, who was a colleague of his father's. He later explained his legislative support for Jim Crow by saying that any attempt to oppose it "would have killed me in politics forever."

Having earned his law degree in 1949, Winter established a practice in Grenada, though he struggled to find clients. Later in the summer Stennis asked him to join his staff in Washington, D.C., and he agreed to do so at the end of the 1950 state legislative session. During that session he coauthored a bill to fund the establishment of the University of Mississippi Medical Center and another to establish a commission to study government reorganization. He also supported a "Subversive Act" introduced amid Cold War fears of communist infiltration of government, which would require all state workers to sign a loyalty pledge. During the discussions following the bill's introduction, one representative rose to denounce several professors at the University of Mississippi for "socialistic" teachings, including Winter's friend and former instructor, history professor Jim Silver. Winter stood in defense of Silver and warned against "an irresponsible witch hunt" at the university.

Winter joined Stennis' staff upon the session's end and joined him in Washington during the United States Congress' 1950 session. Upon Congress' adjournment, he returned home and married Elise Varner, whom he had dated for four years, on October 10. They had three daughters together. Upon Congress' reconvening, Winter researched statehood matters in preparation for measures to consider granting state status to the Territory of Alaska and the Territory of Hawaii, though these measures were later quashed. After initial doubts, Winter resolved to seek re-election to the legislature in 1951, and did so without opposition. Upon his return in the 1952 session, he was appointed chairman of the Agriculture Committee, which produced a law that offered loans to farmers seeking to expanding their poultry and livestock operations. He also introduced two unsuccessful judicial reform bills. During the 1954 session he cosponsored a bill to establish Hugh White State Park and Carver Point State Park, the latter being the first state park for blacks.

In 1954 Winter was invited to a public meeting in Greenwood organized by white residents in response to the United States Supreme Court's decision in Brown v. Board of Education, ordering public schools across the country to integrate. Attendees at the meeting advocated massive resistance to the court order, suggesting that Mississippi should abolish its public school system to avoid desegregation. Winter stood to say that while he supported segregation, he disapproved of ending the public school system, saying "Supreme Court is not going to let us get by with that". Unnerved by the cold response to his remarks, he left the meeting convinced he had to make "no pretense about not being for segregation," though he subsequently refused an invitation to join a segregationist Citizens' Council in Grenada, saying "I don't know where that's going." In the legislature he remained generally supportive of racial segregation, though he disavowed certain attempts to block integration which he thought completely lacked constitutional basis. He reluctantly backed a referendum which empowered the legislature to close schools when education funding increases were jeopardized and abstained on a vote to strengthen the state's literacy tests for voting registration. He joined several other representatives in voting against a measure to censure journalist Hodding Carter for his criticism of Citizens' Councils.

Although he was disillusioned with the legislature's focus on contentious racial issues, Winter resolved to seek re-election in 1955 and won. He actively campaigned for the election of James P. Coleman as governor, who he viewed as more moderate on race. During this time Winter and other younger lawmakers began mulling over the possibility of challenging Sillers' speakership, feeling he held too much power and allowed the House to be distracted by unimportant business. Coleman visited Winter in Grenada and expressed his displeasure with Sillers, and advised Winter to seek out support for a speakership bid. In mid-June Winter publicly declared that he would seek the speakership. While Coleman became the governor-elect, Sillers shored up his own support. Sillers offered to guide Coleman's legislative program through the House if he remained out of the speakership race. Coleman advised Winter that he could not publicly support him and urged him to concede. Winter pressed on with his quest when the legislature reconvened in January 1956. In the vote for the speakership he lost, earning 40 votes in comparison to 94 votes for Sillers. Sillers retaliated by stripping Winter's supporters of most important committee assignments; Winter was reappointed to the Agriculture Committee but was not made its chair. With Sillers in control of the House, it again turned its attention to racial matters. Winter abstained on several votes and attempted to amend some measures without success.

== State Tax Collector ==
During the last week the state house was in session in March 1956, State Tax Collector Nellah Massey Bailey died. The position was one of the highest-paid positions in Mississippi as it was tasked with collecting a "black market tax" since 1944. The office brought in large streams of revenue, mostly from illegal liquor sales, of which the office was entitled to keep ten percent. Many legislators speculated about who would be appointed to the vacant post. Coleman, apologetic about not supporting Winter in his bid for the speakership, summoned the legislator and offered him the job, knowing that it would provide him with a large income and give him a platform from which he could make future bids for statewide office. Winter accepted, and the appointment was announced two days later.

Winter assumed the office in April 1956 and closed his law practice. While Mississippi was officially a dry state, enforcement of alcohol prohibitions were so haphazard and irregular across different jurisdictions that liquor sales were essentially treated as a local option issue, and the state hosted thousands of establishments that sold alcohol. Enforcement of the black market tax was simple for Winter's office. He employed a few deputy tax collectors, a secretary, and a bookkeeper. Most of Mississippi's liquor was imported from Louisiana, and the two states' governments had earlier reached an agreement whereby Mississippi supplied Louisiana some funds in exchange for the latter providing a list of all Mississippian liquor purchasers. Supplied with this information, the deputy tax collectors would visit the bootleggers who had purchased liquor and apply a standard fee for cases of wine and liquor. Most bootleggers complied with the tax. Paying the tax did not exempt bootleggers from enforcement of dry laws, and Winter's office would supply certifications of black market tax payments as evidence of bootlegging to law enforcement officials upon request.

Winter accumulated a significant income while serving as tax collector. In 1958 his office brought in a record $1.3 million in revenue. Of this, the office received $130,000, and, after paying about $67,000 to cover his staff's salaries and other office expenses, he pocketed the rest. Winter averaged between $60,000 and $80,000 in personal income per year he held the office and cumulatively acquired about $600,000 throughout his seven and-a-half year tenure. A 1962 feature in Life stated that he was the second-highest remunerated public official in the country, with the President of the United States being the first. Some of Winter's opponents later asserted that his time as tax collector enabled him to become immensely wealthy. This was an exaggeration, though the tax collector's income enabled his family to live comfortably.

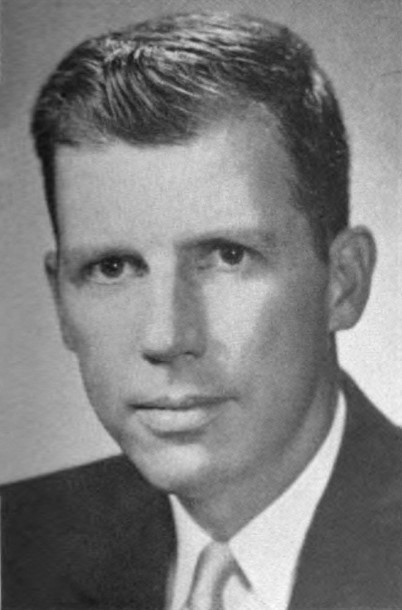
Winter as Mississippi State Tax Collector, ca. 1961

Upon assuming control of the office, Winter promised to have it abolished. He felt the post was unnecessary and inefficient, and that its duties should be assigned to the State Tax Commission. He informed some legislators of his wish, but no action was taken towards the dissolution of the office in the legislature's 1958 session. This was due to the opposition of the head of the tax commission, who wanted to dissociate himself from the black market tax, fears among legislators that such an action would provoke wider debates about the liquor issue, and the alleged opposition of other legislators, including Sillers, that the dissolution of the office with Winter's support would amount to a victory for a political opponent.

Winter decided to run for re-election in 1959. In January of that year circuit court Judge Sebe Dale, an avowed prohibitionist, denounced the tax collector office's arrangement with Louisiana as a felony conspiracy to violate state liquor laws and asked a Lamar County grand jury to indict Winter. The jury failed to indict him, but Dale declared he would ask a grand jury in each county on his circuit to indict the state tax collector. When Dale held court in Lawrence County later in February, Winter snuck into the court room as Dale presented the case for an indictment to a grand jury. When Dale finished, Winter rose and asked for permission to argue his case to the jury. The judge refused, but the jury requested his argument. Winter explained to the jurors how the black market tax worked, stated that his actions were pursuant to the duties of his office as laid out by the legislature, highlighted the additional revenue raised by the tax, and asked for them to vote for his re-election. The jury failed to return an indictment and Dale ceased his quest against Winter.

Winter faced nine opponents in his re-election bid, most of them arguing that he had had his "turn" in the high-paying office. He used $50,000 of his own money to fund his campaign, often by showing up at local television stations to buy air time, and then walking on set to deliver a campaign pitch in a live broadcast. Winter failed to win an outright majority in the first primary, but won a runoff against John Whitfield Birdsong largely due to his more prominent public presence. In April 1957 he was appointed to the board of trustees of the Mississippi Department of Archives and History. He was elected president of the board in 1969, and served in that capacity until 2007.

An active political figure, Winter traveled across the state to deliver speeches and make appearances. In this capacity he found the political situation necessitated that he offer a public position on racial issues and segregation. Though privately disagreeing with white extremism and massive resistance to federal integration efforts in favor of more subtle delay, he publicly supported segregation and otherwise tried to avoid addressing the issue. He cofounded a group of moderates, the Young Democrats, to serve as a counterweight to more extremists factions, though it gained little influence. He supported John F. Kennedy's presidential campaign during the 1960 presidential election despite an insurgent candidacy based on segregation headed by Mississippi Governor Ross Barnett. Following the Ole Miss riot of 1962, Winter began seeking out a more moderate approach for the state to address federal integration. At a public gathering at All Saints' College he stated that Mississippi required a leader "who can successfully turn his people from a preoccupation with the race issue and the supercharged emotions of fear, anxiety, and hate which that issue suggests" in favor of pursuing economic development and "an effective educational system".

Winter later resumed his quest to have his position abolished and received support for the idea from the new head of the state tax commission. His opponents in the legislature also figured that it was more politically beneficial to allow Winter to take the credit for dissolving an unnecessary post than to let him remain in office and accumulate more money for future political campaigns. In 1962 the legislature passed a measure which would abolish the office and assign its responsibilities to the State Tax Commission effective January 1964, the end of Winter's term. He praised the action as "a step forward in state administration" and projected that the abolition could save the state $250,000.

== State Treasurer ==
Results of the 1963 Mississippi State Treasurer Democratic primary by county Winter—30-40% Winter—40-50% Winter—50-60% Winter—60-70% Winter—70-80% Winter—80-90%

With his tenure as tax collector soon to end, Winter considered turning to full-time legal practice before ultimately deciding to run in 1963 for Mississippi State Treasurer. He faced B.G. Jones and Charlie Mosby in the Democratic primary. He spent three months travelling the state to give stump speeches, and won the primary with 60 percent of the vote, winning eighty-one of Mississippi's eighty-two counties. As treasurer, Winter was tasked with managing the distribution of funds across the state government. He was also in charge of issuing state bonds, though he encountered difficulty in selling them on New York financial markets due to Mississippi's lackluster national reputation for its opposition to civil rights.

Winter encouraged the racial integration of Fondren Church, of which he was a member. He was in Washington, D.C., when he learned that President Kennedy had been assassinated. Winter was initially angered to learn that some Mississippian segregationists were pleased by this development, but later expressions of mourning throughout the state led him to conclude that a "basic decency" prevailed in the state and could be used to challenge white racial extremism. As violent resistance to desegregation increased, white moderates in Mississippi increasingly began seeking out a more middling strategy to deal with race issues and viewed Winter as a possible leader. By early 1965 he had begun public appealing to Mississippians to stop resisting federal civil rights measures, saying to one gathering that the state needed "to lay aside old slogans and myths".

That summer Winter attended the Neshoba County Fair. After a string of other politicians criticized the Civil Rights Act of 1964, he addressed the fairgoers to attack the "rash and reckless defiance by a political leadership that would invite bloodshed and the destruction of our institutions [...] Our state needs as never before the constructive leader who will find the solution who will find the way, not the despairing critic who knows only the voice of alarm." In the latter portion of 1967 he oversaw the sale of a $130 million bond issue to support Ingalls Shipbuilding in Pascagoula. He left the treasurer's office in 1968.

== 1967 gubernatorial campaign ==
Winter announced his candidacy in the 1967 gubernatorial election in January 1967, despite his own doubts about the potential of a candidate with a moderate position on race. Former governor Barnett (who had been out of office the four previous years due to limits on gubernatorial succession), radio personality Jimmy Swan, and prosecutor Bill Waller also ran in the primary. Early polling showed Winter running second to Barnett. Many Mississippians opposed a second Barnett term and recruited Congressman John Bell Williams, a segregationist with a reputation as an effective campaigner, to run, much to Winter's disappointment.

Winter ran by emphasizing his Mississippian roots and experience in government, and promised to improve education and job opportunities. His campaign also produced some of the first modern television political advertisements in the state's history. Incumbent governor Paul B. Johnson Jr. did not endorse any candidates, but was rumored to favor Winter. An April poll showed Winter leading the primary with forty-five percent of the vote, with Williams following at thirty-one percent. Despite occasional jeering at public appearances accusing him of being a "nigger-lover", he tried to avoid discussing race early on in the campaign, instead saying he wanted to focus on "bread-and-butter issues, not the old emotional ones—not racial issues." None of the other candidates planned to openly appeal to the black electorate despite the passage of the federal Voting Rights Act of 1965 having enabled the registration of thousands of new black voters in the state.

As the primary campaign went on, Winter increasingly sought to appeal to white segregationists. He attended the Jackson Citizens' Council's forum in May with the other candidates. He stated "The overwhelming majority of Mississippians don't like the chaos that is being forced upon our schools by the HEW [...] I have three little girls and I am not going to forsake them to the HEW social planners and bleeding heart liberals as long as there is a breath in my body," in response to a question concerning school integration. He also stated that "I was born a segregationist and raised a segregationist. I have always defended that position. I defend it now." He finished by saying that it would be "the greatest disservice" if racial issues became "a political football" and said "The people of Mississippi want a man who is not afraid to fight [...] but one who has common sense enough to win. They are tired of losers [...] they want winners. This spawned a new slogan for Winter's campaign, "Fight to Win for Mississippi".

Feeling that he had done enough to address the race issue, Winter refocused his efforts on fleshing out a political platform. He proposed a "Winter Plan for Better Schools" which included decreasing class sizes, boosting teachers' and other school staff members' salaries, and increasing course offerings. He also released 12-point plan for industrial development. His campaign ultimately developed 15 "Winter Plans" for various issues. Winters' opponents kept their focus on race and denounced him as a "liberal". Some black leaders quietly backed him, mindful that a vocal show of support would tarnish his image among white Mississippians. Winter tried to counter segregationists' doubts about him by tying himself to Senators James Eastland and John Stennis—both clear segregationists—and by stressing law and order—a position which placed him in contrast to disorderly civil rights protests and riots elsewhere in the country. He generally refrained from directly attacking the other candidates.

Winter placed first in the primary with Williams in second place and a runoff being required. In anticipation of the runoff primary, Winter and his team decided that they would need to pick up the votes of segregationist who had sided with Barnett and Swan by characterizing Williams as an inadequate defender of segregation. Barnett endorsed Winter to avenge Williams' attacks on himself. Winter initially adopted a hardline stance on segregation, saying he opposed Johnson's presidency and would support Alabama Governor George Wallace or Republican Ronald Reagan in the 1968 presidential election "to preserve conservative government". Quickly losing the will to continue this rhetoric, he returned to his previous messages emphasizing his experience and his plans for reform. Williams and his supporters in turn attacked Winter as disingenuous. His campaign also distributed literature which warned that "William Winter's election will ensure negro domination of Mississippi's elections for generations to come." Winter received the majority of the black vote in the runoff primary, but lost to Williams.

== Lieutenant governor ==
Winter became involved in private legal work after leaving the treasurer's office. At the suggestion of municipal bond attorney John N. Mitchell, he joined with several other lawyers in creating a successful bond practice. The Winter family continued to support the public school system in Jackson during integration efforts as many white parents withdrew their children, leading them and other public school proponents to receive cards in the mail saying "You are being watched." Concerns about racial issues continued to worry Winter as he mulled a potential run for governor in 1971. Senator Eastland and former governor Johnson both encouraged him to run to fight their political enemy and presumptive frontrunner, Lieutenant Governor Charles L. Sullivan. Winter was concerned about what "commitments" he would have to make by entering the race with the endorsement of such conservative politicians and he was still focused on retiring outstanding debts from his previous gubernatorial campaign. He chose to run for lieutenant governor instead as its primary had attracted no obvious major candidates and the job would allow him time to continue at his bond practice. He publicly announced his campaign in April 1971.

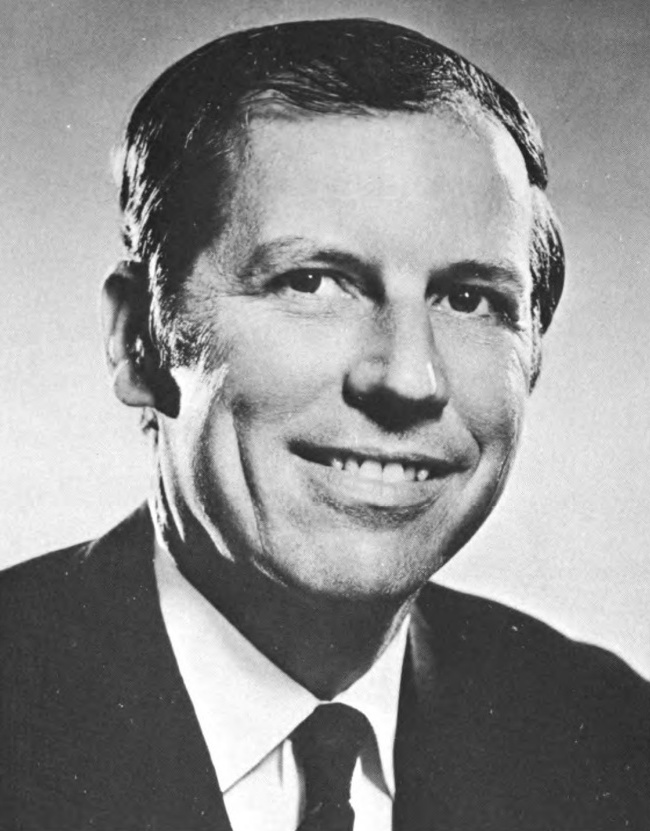
Winter as Lieutenant Governor ca. 1973

Race ultimately became a much more muted factor in the Democratic primary as the moderate Waller won the gubernatorial nomination. District attorney Cliff Finch and segregationist Elmore Greaves ran against Winter in the primary. He campaigned on the same issues of education and economic development he had discussed in 1967, and paid more attention to organizing young voters. He won the nomination and faced no opposition in the general election. He was sworn in on January 17, 1972. Though somewhat regretful that he had not entered the gubernatorial race, as lieutenant governor Winter held significant influence; the office presided over the state senate, appointed its committees, chaired its Rules Committee, cast tie-breaking votes in the body, and he was ex officio member of a number of state boards. His feelings about holding the office were generally mixed, appreciating remaining involved in politics but disappointed that he did not have "access to the center of [the] decision-making process." He did not desire multiple terms and dodged controversial issues, leading some observers to characterize him as a weak legislative figure.

Winter was challenged in his leadership of the state senate by Finance Committee chairman Ellis B. Bodron and Appropriations Committee chairman Bill Burgin. He attempted to seek consensus as the state senate's presiding officer, but would converse with committee chairmen to bring measures to the floor for a vote if he thought them important and used his power to assign bills to committees to protect legislation he favored. During the 1974 session Winter employed the latter ability to his advantage by assigning a 16th Section Land-use reform bill to the Judiciary Committee and not its anticipated recipient, the Education Committee, where member Burgin was likely to quash it. The reform bill ultimately passed. He also used legislative maneuvers to ensure the passage of a small loan reform bill and supported improvements to social services, increased protection for natural resources, and the ratification of the Equal Rights Amendment (which did not occur). Winter's primary focus while serving as lieutenant governor was education reform, though most measures towards this effort—including bills to create public kindergartens and reestablish a compulsory education requirement—were killed in the Senate's Education Committee.

Winter had minimal communication with Waller during his tenure, largely due to the latter's lack of attentiveness to legislative affairs and the former's desire to remain independent of the governor. Both men encouraged the reunification of the Mississippi Freedom Democratic Party with the regular Democratic delegation without success in advance of the 1972 Democratic National Convention. Winter avoided the convention and was worried by its nomination of liberal George McGovern, who he ultimately voted for but did not publicly support. Winter and Waller served as ex officio members of the Mississippi State Sovereignty Commission, which was established by the legislature in 1956 to maintain segregation in the state. Both men maintained their distance from the body, and Winter only attended its meetings once to affirm the governor's veto of its funding, and it de facto ceased to exist in 1973. He left office on January 14, 1976.

== 1975 gubernatorial campaign ==
Winter began planning another gubernatorial campaign after the 1972 legislative session ended and officially launched his campaign in June 1975. Despite advice from a pollster and other politicians that Mississippians wanted a candidate who represented "change" in wake of the Watergate scandal, Winter's campaign focused on his record and experience. His campaign material attempted to characterize him as warmer and down-to-earth, but this image gained little traction. His attempts to portray himself as honest and principled were sullied by some ethics complaints from State Senator Theodore Smith and his opposition to a limit on campaign spending. Winter attempted to cultivate black support, but made no open appeals to the black community as he feared a backlash from conservative whites. Polls conducted in July 1975 showed Winter still leading in the primary, and he gained the endorsement of several major newspapers.

Meanwhile, Finch, one of his opponents, ran a "working man's" campaign which featured him performing various manual labor tasks. Winter dismissed these as gimmicks and stunts, but they garnered support for Finch. Another candidate, Maurice Dantin, accused Winter of having a conflict of interest by remaining at his law firm while serving as lieutenant governor. Television ads broadcasting in the last two weeks of the campaign before the primary repeated this message and, despite some factual inaccuracies, damaged Winter's appeal. Winter placed first in the primary while Finch came second, and Dantin placed third. Winter and Finch both repeated the same messages they had used in the first primary in anticipation of the runoff, though Winter's campaign literature advertised him as "A statesman. Not a stuntman." He also criticized Finch as lacking in a substantive program, but increasingly the working class began to view Finch as a "friend". Finch also made successful entreaties to black voters. Finch defeated Winter in the runoff with one of the largest victories ever in a gubernatorial runoff. The defeat left Winter convinced that his political career was over.

== Gubernatorial career ==
=== 1979 campaign and election ===
Finch's time in office was marred by corruption scandals, and his unfavorable rating increased as his term approached its end. In January 1979 Winter encountered a former aide, Bill Cole who was assisting another candidate in that year's election and conducting polling. Cole asked if he could add Winter's name to statewide survey on persons who could be elected governor. Winter agreed, and Cole later called him to indicate that his chances in the 1979 gubernatorial election were favorable. After further investigating his chances, he declared his candidacy on June 6, 1979. He denounced the "corruption and mismanagement" of Finch's administration and linked Finch's troubles with Lieutenant Governor Evelyn Gandy, the frontrunner in the Democratic primary race at the time. Instead of appearing at a series of rallies and events, he would typically drive to a supporter's home in a given locale, and use their phone to call up other supporters and potential voters to say he was in the area and would appreciate their vote. He would then go to the local radio station or newspaper office to get free media publicity. Styling himself as economically conservative and supportive of business, Winter's preeminent campaign issue was the reform of the state's educational system. Gandy placed first in the primary while Winter placed second.

Winter was buoyed by his image as a moderate, professional, experienced public official which stood in sharp contrast to the public's perception of Finch's time in office as haphazard. Gandy's reputation was harmed by her association with Finch and the fact that she was a woman. Due to the latter factor, Winter's campaign organization attempted to craft an image of "toughness" for him, and released television commercials that showed him posing with tanks and firing a gun at a weapons range. Winter won the runoff with fifty-seven percent of the vote. In the general election Winter faced Republican nominee Gil Carmichael. Carmichael had lost the 1975 gubernatorial race to Finch and thought that his own moderate and professional image would help him. However, he had been harmed by a bitter Republican primary and in Winter had an opponent who exuded a similar public image but was more experienced in office. Winter won the general election by a margin of 149,568 votes, earning 61 percent of the total vote. He later recalled, "It was the easiest race I ever made." He was inaugurated as Governor of Mississippi on January 22, 1980, in the Old Mississippi State Capitol.

=== Executive action and appointments ===
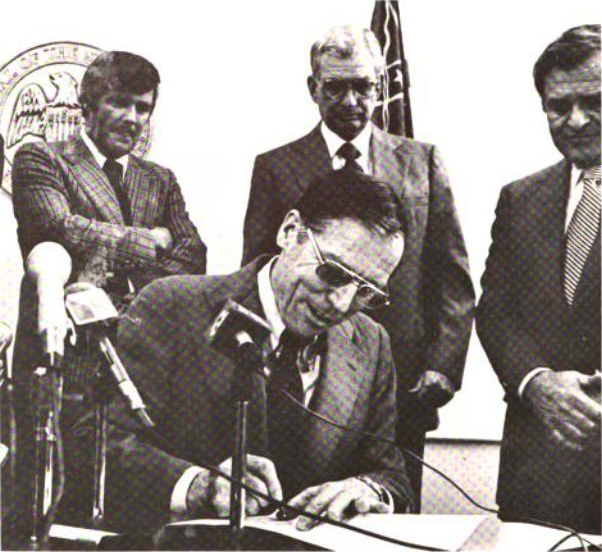
Winter signing the Uniform Personnel Act into law, February 8, 1980

Winter assembled a staff with a mix of younger aides and several more experienced politicians. He usually met with them on weekday mornings and let them debate policy amongst themselves before he made his own decision. He tended to delegate authority to his subordinates and left smaller executive matters to his appointees to determine. He kept in regular contact with appointed agency heads through a monthly breakfast, and did the same with the separately-elected officers of other state departments. He supported and signed the Uniform Personnel Act into law in 1980, which extended civil service protections to 27,000 public employees and created a new state personnel board. He also issued an executive order to remove questions regarding race from state job application forms and ended the appointment of honorary colonels. New legislation enabled the governor to dissolve the state Department of Motor Vehicles—which had been marred by corruption in the Finch administration—and consolidate the fifteen agencies managed by the Division of Federal and State Programs into a single office. He also supported new efforts by the Department of Health to raise additional revenue by imposing additional user fees for services and adding a $5 surcharge to traffic infraction fines to create an emergency medical services fund.

Keen to improve economic development, Winter appointed leading business and development figures to the directing board of the Department of Economic Development. These were all white men, a point which received wide criticism. In response, Winter created a Minority Economic Development Task Force to quiet these concerns. Of the 406 appointments he made between January and June 1980, 91 were black; aside from the Department of Economic Development board, blacks ended up on most major state boards or commissions. Some black leaders nevertheless criticized Winter for not adequately consulting them on his choices. He appointed relatively few women to such positions. The governor was empowered to fill judicial vacancies. Traditionally this power was used to elevate friends and allies to judgeships, but Winter instead created a judicial nominations commission to screen and recommend candidates for appointment. Through this process he appointed Lenore L. Prather, the first female judge on the Supreme Court of Mississippi, and Reuben V. Anderson, the first black state circuit court judge.

Winter attempted to project a positive national image for Mississippi. As part of this, he was actively involved in the National Governors Association and chaired the Southern Growth Policies Board from 1981 to 1982. He and his wife also put on a series of special events known as "Dinner at the Mansion", when they hosted famous Mississippian writers, musicians, and other notables at the Governor's Mansion. He secured state financial backing for the Mississippi Picnic in Central Park, an annual gathering of Mississippians in New York City, to promote favorable publicity to the state.

=== Legislative action ===
In the 1980s the legislature was the most powerful branch of government in Mississippi. Winter sought to cultivate a good working relationship with Speaker Buddie Newman and Lieutenant Governor Brad Dye and hosted a weekly breakfast for them at the Governor's Mansion when the legislature was in session. Despite this, he generally had difficulty in securing the body's support for his ideas, though he did convince lawmakers to create a low-interest mortgage fund and pass other minor bills. In 1979 the legislature had passed an $83 million tax cut. Combined with declining sales tax revenue and reduced federal aid, this forced Winter to manage budget deficits for his entire term. His entreaties to reverse the cut were largely unsuccessful. Ultimately, he had to remove $70 million in expenditures from the 1981 government budget, $100 million from the 1982 budget, and $80 million from the 1983 budget. His familiarity with many legislators enabled him to exert some influence over the Commission on Budget and Accounting, and he convinced them to hire his preferred director of the body.

Mississippi's economy in the 1980s was under strain; while the state had enjoyed some success in attracting low-wage, low-skill industry to replace declining agricultural fortunes due to its cheap labor force and low taxes, American companies were increasingly moving their low-skill positions abroad. In the 1980s it had the lowest income per capita among the states. Winter believed the state needed to be competitive in attracting high-skill industry and that the best way to do this was to reform the state public education system, arguing that the economy underperformed "because we have too many underproductive people—too many unskilled people—too many undereducated people. And we are going to be last until we do something about that problem." At the beginning of its 1980 session, he asked the legislature to form a committee to study education reform. This led to the founding of the Blue Ribbon Committee on Education, which produced 23 proposals for improving public education, including the establishment of public kindergartens, the creation of a new state board of education, strengthening the compulsory education law, new measures to equalize funding across different schools, and salary hikes for school staff. The committee also offered several suggestions for funding the proposals, including repealing the 1979 tax cut; increasing alcohol, tobacco, and soft drink taxes, hiking the corporate income tax, and raising the oil and gas severance tax.

The proposals died in the 1981 session, though Winter convinced the legislature to adopt an open records law which classified all government papers as public property and placed them in the care of the Department of Archives and History. He began cultivating support for education reform in preparation for the 1982 session. He met with business leaders, civic groups, and teachers' organizations to feel out their opinions, while his wife and aides toured schools and delivered speeches. The effort was successful overall in gaining public support for education reform. Most state education groups, the NAACP, Mississippi Economic Council, League of Women Voters, and Children's Defense Fund all endorsed the proposals. A late 1981 poll conducted by Mississippi State University found that 61 percent of Mississippians supported public kindergartens and 91 percent supported stronger compulsory education measures. By 1982, Winter had established a network of lobbyists ready to boost his ideas.

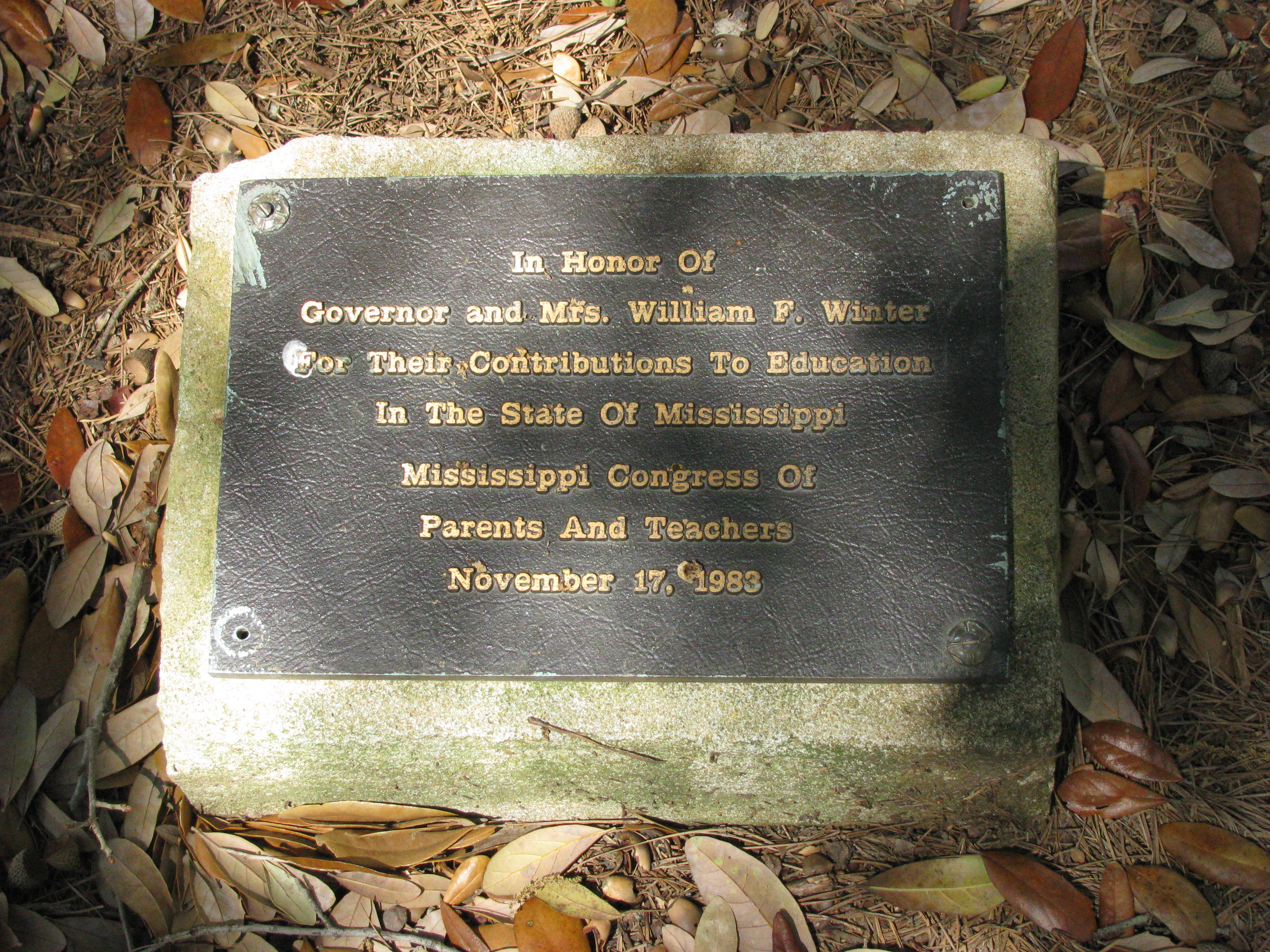
Plaque at the Mississippi State Capitol honoring Winter's and his wife's contributions to public education

Despite the increased public support and organizing, Winter's proposals only had marginally more success in the 1982 session. A bill to establish public kindergartens faced a deadline for approval in the House by February 11. On February 10, towards the end of the day, Newman rejected motions to advance the bill and instead called a voice vote to adjourn. Declaring the motion passed, he adjourned the House and walked out of the room. Regardless of whatever the true feelings were of a majority of the state house members, Newman's adjournment appeared to some lawmakers and much of the public to be an abuse of power. Ultimately, the only reform-supportive move by the legislature was its scheduling of a referendum for November to amend the state constitution to create a new board of education. The media began to criticize Winter for ineffectiveness, but the press directed most of its attacks against the legislature. ABC's 20/20 program broadcast a feature on education in Mississippi in August, blaming Newman for the lack of progress on reform. Winter's staff spent the overwhelming portion of the latter half the year focused on lining up public support for the education proposals. The governor went on speaking tours, while radio and television advertisements were run with the aim of putting pressure on lawmakers. The approval of the November referendum encouraged him enough to convince him to call the legislature into a special session on December 6 solely to consider education reform, thus giving him the political initiative.

Facing enormous pressure from the public and the state's major newspapers, the state house quickly put together the Education Reform Act, which included public kindergartens, a raise for teacher salaries, new teaching certification and school accreditation standards, more robust compulsory education measures, and provisions to hire reading aides for elementary schools. On December 11, the House approved the bill, and the following week it was sent to the Senate for consideration, where it became stalled in the Finance Committee, which removed the provisions for public kindergartens. Under pressure from Dye, Bodron voted to move the bill forward, but continued to openly criticize the proponents of the bill and denounced Winter's young aides as "the Boys of Spring". On December 16, the bill was debated by the Senate and kindergarten provisions were narrowly restored. Shortly thereafter the Senate adopted the full bill. Following a meeting of a conference committee to resolve differences between the two versions of the legislation, the Education Reform Act was adopted on December 20 by both Houses. Winter signed it into law the following day. He received substantial praise in the national media and from Democratic leaders for his success in pushing through the reforms.

Having gained political momentum in the legislature, in the 1983 session Winter successfully pushed through the Public Utilities Reform Act and several penal reform measures, including a $51 million appropriations bill to fund the construction of new state correctional facilities to alleviate overcrowding and a separate women's penitentiary. Continuing to struggle with budget deficits, he called another special session of the legislature in November 1983 and convinced it to temporarily raise sales taxes and impose an individual and corporate income surtax to resolve an impending $120 million shortfall in the next fiscal year.

=== Political affairs ===
The Mississippi Democratic Party reunited in 1976, but as part of a compromise it was temporarily agreed that it would have two co-chairs, one black and one white, instead of a single leader. Plans were made to return to a single chairman in 1980, and Winter nominated Danny Cupit for the position. Cupit was a white lawyer who had gained the respect of black Democrats, but many blacks were nevertheless angered that a white man was suggested for the post. Some leaders began to work towards a compromise, but at the party's executive committee meeting in May 1980 Winter argued that it was important to keep white voters from defecting from the organization, saying "I think at this time what we need to lead this party is a white chairman." Feeling insulted, black leaders walked out of the meeting. Black legislator Aaron Henry accused Winter of "duplicity". Winter refused to apologize for his remarks, leading the state NAACP to accuse him of using "the Black Vote for his own political purposes". An agreement was later reached in June between Winter and Henry to reorganize and rebalance the state chapter's leadership.

Winter attended and spoke at the 1980 Democratic National Convention, which re-nominated Jimmy Carter as the Democratic candidate in the 1980 United States presidential election. Afterwards he actively campaigned for Carter's reelection, though Carter ultimately lost both in Mississippi and the entire country. He supported a black Democratic nominee for a congressional race in the state, Robert G. Clark Jr., during the 1982 election although Clark lost and he angered some of his white constituents. Winter played a key role in maintaining Democratic unity during Mississippi's 1983 state elections and enlisted numerous candidates of similar attitude to him—many of them proponents of education reform—to run for office. One of his aides, Ray Mabus, was elected State Auditor, and another, Dick Molpus, was elected Secretary of State. Bill Cole, his former chief of staff who he had appointed state treasurer to fill a vacancy, was elected to the office in his own right. Two other staffers, Marshall Bennett and Steve Patterson, achieved elective office several years later. Constitutionally restricted to a single term, Winter left gubernatorial office on January 10, 1984, and was succeeded by William Allain.

== Later life and death ==
With his time as governor coming to an end, Winter briefly considered accepting an appointment as chancellor of the University of Mississippi before deciding against it. After finishing his term he ran for a seat in the United States Senate against Republican incumbent Thad Cochran at the urging of national Democrats eager to recapture control of the U.S. Senate. He announced his campaign on February 6, 1984, and campaigned little before primary, in which he easily defeated three challengers for the nomination. Despite this, many of his regular supporters had backed Cochran, and Winter was unenthusiastic in campaigning. With polls showing Cochran ahead by a large margin, he adopted a more aggressive strategy, attacking the incumbent for his support for some of President Ronald Reagan's policies. Cochran in turn accused Winter of running only at the behest of the national Democratic Party. Both men presented a moderate image which appealed to black voters, thus denying Winter the guaranteed backing of this constituency. He also publicly supported Walter Mondale's campaign for the presidency, despite the fact that most Mississippians thought Mondale too liberal. Though public approval was favorable to both Cochran and Winter, Cochran ranked higher in polls and voters favored his experience. He defeated Winter in the election, taking 61 percent of the vote.

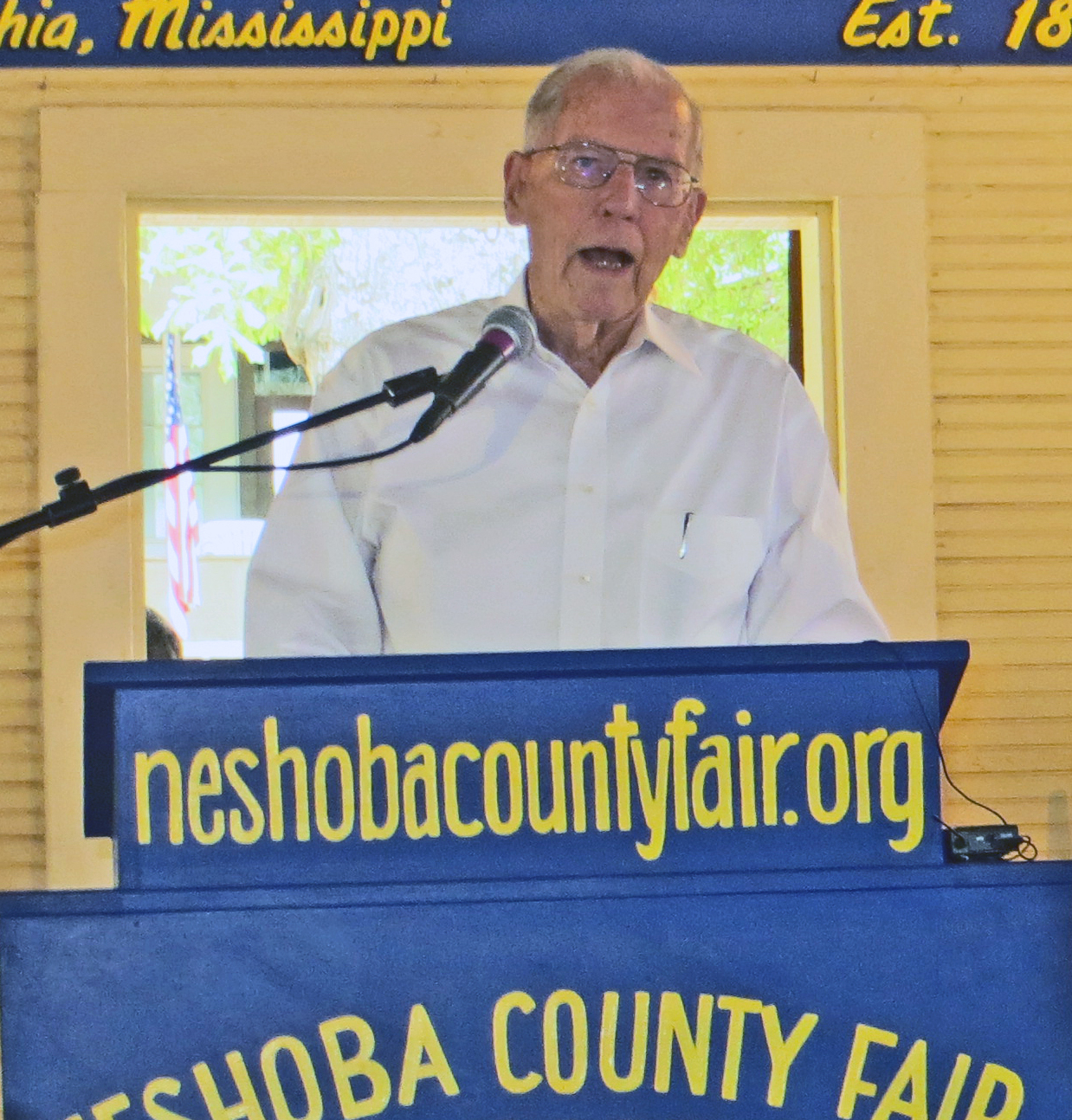
Winter at the 2014 Neshoba County Fair

Following his defeat, Winter taught a seminar on Southern politics at the Harvard Institute of Politics for the spring 1985 semester and served as a commentator for WJTV. From 1985 to 1986 he chaired a panel on rural economic development in the South and another on "the future of the South". Afterwards he spent significant time presenting its findings, calling for renewed focus by policymakers on rural areas and attracting high-tech industry. Upon his return from Harvard he rejoined his former law firm as a senior partner. In 1990, he and power company executive Ed Lupberger created the Foundation for the MidSouth, a regional nonprofit. He continued to advocate for improvements in education as the best means to improve the economy.

Winter remained active in the state Democratic Party, despite its weakening electoral influence, and chaired its finance committee in 1990. He also became involved with the Democratic Leadership Council and co-chaired Bill Clinton's presidential campaigns in 1992 and 1996. Clinton appointed him co-chairman of his Advisory Board on Race in 1997. The goals of the body were to study race relations and make recommendations to the president on ending racism. At the suggestion of Winter and Charles W. Pickering, the University of Mississippi created the Institute for Racial Reconciliation, which was renamed in Winter's honor in 2003. In 2009 he said in a speech, "I have to admit I could not stand up to the pressure for being in public life in Mississippi and come out four-square for the elimination of segregation and for that I apologize today."

Winter argued that the flag of Mississippi should be modified to remove its canton of the Confederate battle flag due to its negative national perception. Governor Ronnie Musgrove appointed Winter to chair a commission in 2000 to advise the legislature on what action to take, if any, on the design of the flag. The commission held a series of public hearings around the state to gauge public opinion on the matter. Most were contentious and showed clear divides between whites who supported retaining the current flag and blacks who wanted to change it. The commission also designed an alternative state flag, and recommended that the legislature vote to hold a public referendum to choose between the two flags. Winter originally opposed a referendum, but came to support it after becoming convinced that constituent pressure would keep the legislature from changing the flag themselves. A referendum was held and, in a divide along racial lines, most Mississippians voted to keep the flag. The state legislature voted to remove the canton in 2020, leading Winter to say, "The battle for a better Mississippi does not end with the removal of the flag."

In 2001, Winter was accorded the National Education Association's Martin Luther King Jr. Memorial Award. The Mississippi Department of Archives and History building was named after him in 2003. He was given the Profile in Courage Award by the John F. Kennedy Presidential Library and Museum in 2007, for his work advancing education and racial reconciliation. However, it would not be the regular Profile in Courage Award, but rather a Profile in Courage Lifetime Achievement Award. In 2006 he and a former aide published a collection of his writings and speeches, The Measure of Our Days. In January 2008, the board of trustees of the Mississippi Department of Archives and History declared him a trustee emeritus of the organization. He conducted fundraising efforts and lobbied the legislature to back the construction of the Museum of Mississippi History and the Mississippi Civil Rights Museum, both of which opened in 2017 as the Two Mississippi Museums. Winter died at the age of 97 on December 18, 2020, at his home in Jackson. Due to the limitations of the COVID-19 pandemic, a public funeral was not held. The Two Mississippi Museums hosted an event on May 3, 2022, to commemorate Winter and his wife.

== Legacy ==
Academic James G. Thomas Jr. wrote, "Governor Winter's legacy is a complex web of sometimes seemingly conflicting politics". Historian Charles C. Bolton wrote, "He made mistakes. He sometimes took actions that were politically expedient or adopted stands he thought necessary to protect a future political career. Yet William Winter steadfastly used his political offices to further the public interest, and his work in the public arena in the more than twenty-five years after he left politics continued that same objective. Our democracy could benefit from more leaders who would emulate the career of William F. Winter." Mabus described him as "the greatest governor Mississippi has ever had". Historian David Halberstam called him "Mississippi's best and strongest governor of modern times. Winter, more than any other politician, is the architect of the new Mississippi and the new America." Academic Maarten Zwiers called him "one of the most successful progressive governors in the history of Mississippi." Historian Tony Badger wrote, "many now see Winter as the most successful governor in Mississippi's history. But he was not then, and is not now, universally admired."

Winter is broadly remembered in Mississippi as its "education governor" for his work on education reform. Historian David Sansing wrote that "he will be most remembered for the Education Reform Act of 1982". Authors Jere Nash and Andy Taggart credited Winter with having "perfected the use of a special session to focus the public's attention on a single issue". Reform continued to dominate political activity in Mississippi for over a decade after Winter's departure from office until falling out of favor in the 1990s as conservatives such as Kirk Fordice became increasingly predominant. His papers are kept by the Mississippi Department of Archives and History.

== Electoral history ==
1963 Mississippi State Treasurer Democratic primary
Party	Candidate	Votes	%	±%
Democratic	William F. Winter	266,876	58.85%	
Democratic	Bob Jones	105,162	23.19%	
Democratic	Charles P. Mosby Jr.	81,449	17.96%	
Total votes		453,487	100.00%	

1963 Mississippi State Treasurer election
Party	Candidate	Votes	%	±%
Democratic	William F. Winter	229,007	100.00%	
Total votes		229,007	100.00%	

1967 Mississippi gubernatorial Democratic primary
Party	Candidate	Votes	%	±%
Democratic	William F. Winter	222,001	32.46%	
Democratic	John Bell Williams	197,778	28.91%	
Democratic	Jimmy Swan	124,361	18.18%	
Democratic	Ross Barnett	76,053	11.12%	
Democratic	Bill Waller	60,090	8.79%	
Democratic	Vernon E. Brown	2,051	0.30%	
Democratic	C. L. McKinley	1,671	0.24%	
Total votes		684,005	100.00%	

1967 Mississippi gubernatorial Democratic primary runoff
Party	Candidate	Votes	%	±%
Democratic	John Bell Williams	371,815	54.49%	
Democratic	William F. Winter	310,527	45.51%	
Total votes		682,342	100.00%	

1971 Mississippi lieutenant gubernatorial Democratic primary
Party	Candidate	Votes	%	±%
Democratic	William F. Winter	434,634	58.80%	
Democratic	Cliff Finch	271,347	36.71%	
Democratic	Elmore D. Greaves	33,206	4.49%	
Total votes		739,187	100.00%	

1971 Mississippi lieutenant gubernatorial election
Party	Candidate	Votes	%	±%
Democratic	William F. Winter	586,655	100.00%	
Total votes		586,655	100.00%	

1975 Mississippi gubernatorial Democratic primary
Party	Candidate	Votes	%	±%
Democratic	William F. Winter	286,652		
Democratic	Cliff Finch	253,829		
Democratic	Maurice Dantin	179,472		
Democratic	John Arthur Eaves	50,606		
Democratic	Leman Gandy	11,966		
Democratic	David Perkins	7,369		
Total votes		789,894	100.00%	

1975 Mississippi gubernatorial Democratic primary runoff
Party	Candidate	Votes	%	±%
Democratic	Cliff Finch	442,864		
Democratic	William F. Winter	324,749		
Total votes		767,613	100.00%	

1979 Mississippi gubernatorial Democratic primary
Party	Candidate	Votes	%	±%
Democratic	Evelyn Gandy	224,714	30.48%	
Democratic	William F. Winter	183,944	24.95%	
Democratic	John Arthur Eaves	143,411	18.42%	
Democratic	Jim Herring	135,812		
Democratic	Charles M. Deaton	34,700	4.71%	
Democratic	Richard Barrett	14,550	1.97%	
Total votes		737,131	100.00%	

1979 Mississippi gubernatorial Democratic runoff primary
Party	Candidate	Votes	%	±%
Democratic	William F. Winter	386,174	56.62%	
Democratic	Evelyn Gandy	295,832	43.38%	
Total votes		682,006	100.00%	

1979 Mississippi gubernatorial election
Party	Candidate	Votes	%	±%
Democratic	William F. Winter	413,620	61.07%	
Republican	Gil Carmichael	263,692	38.93%	
Total votes		677,312	100.00%	

== Footnotes ==
Party political offices
Preceded by Charles L. Sullivan	Democratic nominee for Lieutenant Governor of Mississippi; 1971	Succeeded by Evelyn Gandy
Preceded by Cliff Finch	Democratic nominee for Governor of Mississippi; 1979	Succeeded by William Allain
Preceded by Maurice Dantin	Democratic nominee for U.S. Senator from Mississippi (Class 2); 1984	Vacant Title next held by Bootie Hunt; 1996
Political offices
Preceded by Evelyn Gandy	Treasurer of Mississippi; 1964–1968	Succeeded by Evelyn Gandy
Preceded by Charles Sullivan	Lieutenant Governor of Mississippi; 1972–1976	Succeeded by Evelyn Gandy
Preceded by Cliff Finch	Governor of Mississippi; 1980–1984	Succeeded by William Allain
