= 2027 in Mississippi =

- Decades: 2000s; 2010s; 2020s
- See also: History of Mississippi; Historical outline of Mississippi; List of years in Mississippi; 2027 in the United States

The following is a list of events of the year 2027 in Mississippi.

== Events ==
=== Planned or predicted ===
- November 2 -
  - 2027 Mississippi Secretary of State election
  - 2027 Mississippi gubernatorial election
  - 2027 Mississippi House of Representatives election
  - 2027 Mississippi State Senate election
  - Other 2027 Mississippi elections
