= 2026 in Mississippi =

- Decades: 2000s; 2010s; 2020s
- See also: History of Mississippi; Historical outline of Mississippi; List of years in Mississippi; 2026 in the United States

The following is a list of events of the year 2026 in Mississippi.

== Incumbents ==
=== State government ===
- Governor: Tate Reeves (R)

== Events ==
- January 9 – Six people are killed in a series of shootings in Cedarbluff. A suspect is arrested.
- January 10 – Beth Israel Congregation, the largest synagogue in the state of Mississippi, located in Jackson, is damaged in a suspected arson. A suspect is arrested.
- February 20 – The University of Mississippi Medical Center temporarily closes all 35 of its clinics following a cyberattack.
- March 27 – Five people are killed when a train strikes a van in a rail crossing near Wiggins.
- May 6 – Tornados damage around 500 homes and injure 17 people in the Bogue Chitto area.
- May 12 – Dan Fordice, the son of former Governor Kirk Fordice, is killed after crashing a WW2-era P-51D Mustang near Vicksburg–Tallulah Regional Airport.
- May 28 – The Supreme Court rules in favor of Terry Pitchford, a death row inmate who was convicted of killing a grocery store owner. Pitchford argued that his jury, consisting of 11 white jurors and 1 black juror, was racially biased.
- June 14 – A police officer shoots into a car of two women at a Senatobia Walmart, killing the 1-year-old Kohen Wiley. The infant's aunt is injured.
- July 4 – 18-year-old Nolan Wells disappears while on Horn Island with friends for Independence Day. His body is found two days later.
- July 7 – Former Jackson Mayor Chokwe Antar Lumumba and City Council President Aaron Banks plead guilty to bribery.
- August 3 – Tasia Fortune, a 29-year-old Black woman, is found hanging from a tree in Jackson. In September, a 51-year-old Black man is arrested and charged with killing Fortune.
- October 4 – The former five-story Department of Public Safety administration tower is imploded in Jackson.
- October 31 – A suspected arson damages the Senatobia Police Department headquarters.
- November 3 – 2026 Mississippi elections:
  - 2026 United States House of Representatives elections in Mississippi
  - 2026 United States Senate election in Mississippi

== Deaths ==
- February 3: Reta Holden, 87, politician, member of the Mississippi House of Representatives (1992–1999).

== See also ==
- 2026 in the United States
- 2024–2028 Mississippi Legislature
