= 2023 in Mississippi =

- Decades: 2000s; 2010s; 2020s
- See also: History of Mississippi; Historical outline of Mississippi; List of years in Mississippi; 2023 in the United States

The following is a list of events of the year 2023 in Mississippi.

== Incumbents ==
=== State government ===
- Governor: Tate Reeves (R)

== Events ==
- February 17 – 2023 Arkabutla shootings: Six people are killed in a spree shooting in Arkabutla.
- March 3 – One person is killed in Yazoo County, and more than 310,000 people are left without power across five states due to a system of storms affecting the area.
- March 24 – Tornado outbreak of March 24–25, 2023: At least 26 people are killed after a series of violent tornadoes impact the state.
- March 26 – President Joe Biden approves an emergency declaration for the Mississippi following the storm that killed at least 26 people and caused significant damage, granting federal aid to affected areas of the state. Carroll, Humphreys, Monroe, and Sharkey counties are the main recipients.
- May 4 – Following a multi-state manhunt across the United States, Corey Harrison, the last of four men who escaped from a Mississippi jail in April, are taken into custody, according to authorities.
- June 3 – Two people are killed when a small plane crashes at Tupelo Regional Airport in Tupelo.

== See also ==
- 2023 in the United States
