= 2024 in Mississippi =

- Decades: 2000s; 2010s; 2020s
- See also: History of Mississippi; Historical outline of Mississippi; List of years in Mississippi; 2024 in the United States

The following is a list of events of the year 2024 in Mississippi.

== Incumbents ==
=== State government ===
- Governor: Tate Reeves (R)

== Events ==
- March 3 – One woman killed and twelve others injured in a mass shooting at a night club in West Point.
- March 12 –
  - The Democratic Party holds presidential nominating contests in Mississippi.
  - The Republican Party holds presidential nominating contests in Mississippi.
- March 19 –Rankin County torture incident: Former Mississippi sheriff's deputy Hunter Elward is sentenced to 20 years imprisonment for his role in torturing two men in January 2023.
- April 10 – A person is killed by flooding in Mississippi as severe weather hits the Southern United States.
- August 31 – Seven people are killed and dozens of others are injured in a bus crash near Vicksburg.
- September 20 – 14-year-old Carly Madison Gregg was found guilty and sentenced to life imprisonment for the murder of her mother Ashley Smylie
- October 19 – Three people are killed and eight others are injured in a mass shooting when at least two gunmen opened fire on people at a school's football homecoming win celebration in near Lexington.

== See also ==
- 2024 in the United States
