= Mississippi Legislature =

Legislative branch of the state government of Mississippi

Type
- Type: Bicameral
- Houses: Senate; House of Representatives
- Term limits: None

History
- Founded: October 6, 1817 (208 years ago)
- Preceded by: General Assembly of Mississippi Territory

Leadership
- Senate President: Delbert Hosemann (R) since January 9, 2020
- Senate President pro tempore: Dean Kirby (R) since January 7, 2020
- House Speaker: Jason White (R) since January 2, 2024

Structure
- Seats: 174: 52 senators; 122 representatives
- Senate political groups: Republican (34); Democratic (18)
- House of Representatives political groups: Republican (79); Democratic (41); Independent (2)
- Salary: $23,000/year

Elections
- Last Senate election: November 7, 2023
- Last House of Representatives election: November 7, 2023
- Next Senate election: November 2, 2027
- Next House of Representatives election: November 2, 2027
- Redistricting: Legislative control

Meeting place
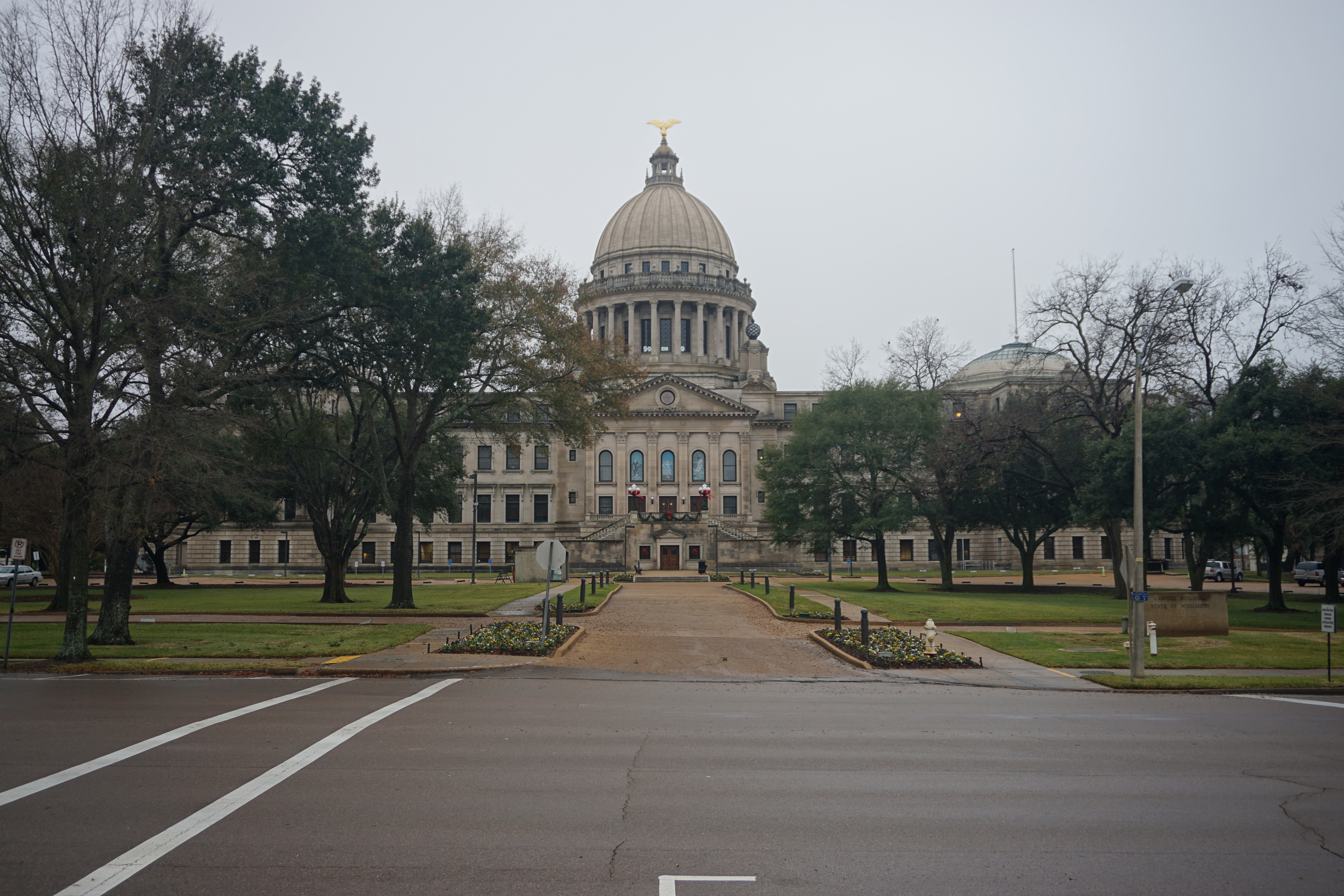
- Mississippi State Capitol; Jackson

Website
- legislature.ms.gov

Constitution
- Constitution of Mississippi

The Mississippi Legislature is the state legislature of the U.S. state of Mississippi. The bicameral Legislature is composed of the lower Mississippi House of Representatives, with 122 members, and the upper Mississippi State Senate, with 52 members. Both representatives and senators serve four-year terms without term limits. The Legislature convenes at the Mississippi State Capitol in Jackson.

== History ==
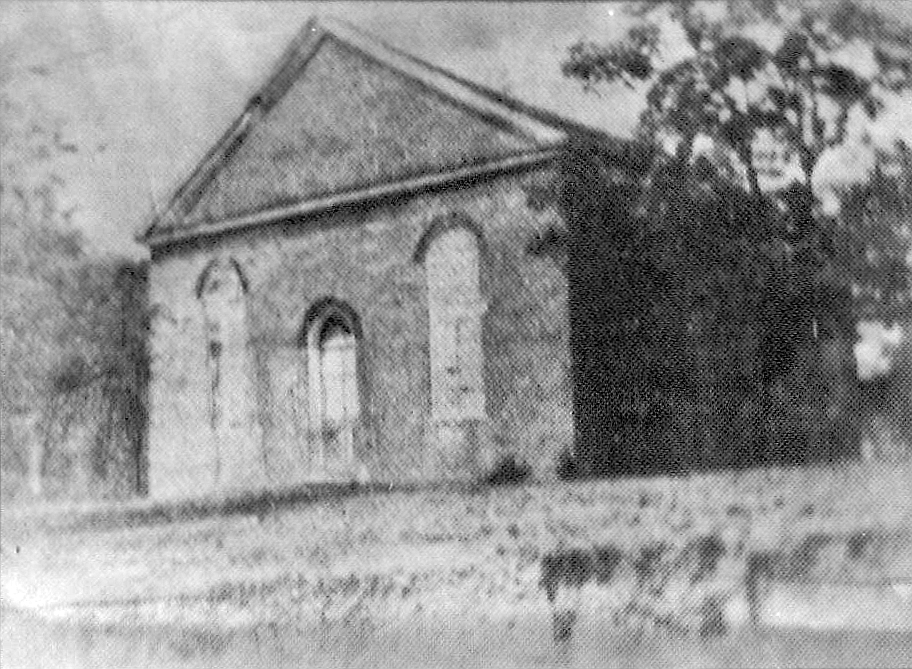
Methodist Meeting House – the first constitutional convention was held at Washington, Mississippi in 1817.

From 1800 until 1833, the legislative body of the Mississippi Territory and the state of Mississippi was known as the "General Assembly". Thereafter, it was known as "the Legislature of the State of Mississippi". Starting in 1832 and continuing through the Reconstruction era, the legislature met for biennial sessions. In 1890, constitutional revisions allowed the body to regularly convene only once every four years. In 1910, the legislature reverted to biennial meetings, and in 1968 it began meeting annually. In 1977, the state constitution was amended to require that legislative districts be apportioned equally in terms of population.

== Membership ==
The Mississippi Legislature has 174 elected members, with 122 members of the Mississippi House of Representatives and 52 members of the Mississippi Senate. Members are elected to four-year terms to represent districts. Among the states, Mississippi has the 14th largest lower house and fifth largest upper house. House districts are drawn such that each encompasses about 24,000 people, while Senate districts are drawn such that each encompasses about 55,000 people. Candidates for the House must be at least 21 years old, while candidates for the Senate must be at least 25 years old. Each house has the authority to judge the qualifications of its own members. The Mississippi Legislature is a citizen legislature; most legislators have full-time occupations unrelated to their official roles. Members receive a base salary of $23,000 per year. As of April 2022, most legislators garnered a total compensation of $40,000 to $50,000 per year from salary, per diem payments, and other reimbursements and payments, with several collecting around $70,000 per year. (Note: The salaries of the speaker of the House and the lieutenant governor are $60,000 per year, but are set to increase to $85,000 annually in 2024.)

All legislators swear a state constitutionally-prescribed oath of office, which requires them to declare allegiance to the state and federal constitutions, pledge to be responsible in the exercise of their duties, and promise not to engage in vote trading. The constitution provides legislators with a limited immunity from arrest during a legislative session and 15 days before or after a session except in cases of "treason, felony, theft, or breach of the peace". In the event of a vacancy in a legislative seat in between regular elections, the governor issues a writ of election to enable a contest to be held to fill the seat for the remainder of its term.

== Structure and process ==
The Constitution of Mississippi provides for a bicameral legislature of the state, composed of a Senate and a House of Representatives, in which all lawmaking authority is vested. The constitution requires the legislature to convene in regular annual sessions, with most lasting for 90 days and sessions on every fourth year lasting for 125 days, though the legislature can extend their sessions with the approval of two-thirds of its members. The governor may also at their discretion call the legislature into a special session to a consider a specific issue of the governor's choosing. Since 1903, the legislature has met in the Mississippi State Capitol in Jackson. One house cannot adjourn its proceedings for over three days without the agreement of the other. A basic majority of one house's members constitutes a quorum to do business, though a smaller group can convene and vote to compel the attendance of absent members.

Each house elects their own officers. The House of Representatives is led by a speaker, who is elected among the preexisting membership in the House. The Senate is led by the lieutenant governor, who is popularly elected by voters in statewide elections and is ex officio president of the Senate. Second to these officers in their respective houses are the speaker pro tempore and president of the Senate pro tempore. The presiding officers determine the leadership of legislative committees in their own houses. In the event of a tied vote in a joint session, the lieutenant governor is empowered to cast a tie-breaking vote. The constitution gives the state legislature the authority to determine rules of its own proceedings, punish its members for disorderly behavior, and expel a member with a two-thirds vote of the membership of their chamber. Legislative proceedings are open to the public unless a closed session for secrecy is deemed necessary, and each house has the power to punish public observers for disorderly and disruptive behavior. Each house keeps an official journal to record its proceedings, including votes on bills.

A bill may originate in either house, and be amended or rejected in the other, and must be read by its title on three different days in each house, unless two-thirds of the house vote to suspend the rules. The Mississippi Constitution prohibits amending a bill to change its original purpose. Bills amended in the second house, must return it to the first for a vote to accept amendments. All bills must be considered by a committee in each house. No bills can be introduced in the last three days of a session. Most bills are passed by a simple majority vote of each chamber. Any revenue bill or measure that alters the assessment of taxable property requires the approval of three-fifths of legislators present and voting. Every bill passed by both houses is signed by the presiding officers of each house.

== Powers ==
The Mississippi Legislature has the power to write state laws and craft appropriations to fund state government. All bills passed by the legislature become law unless vetoed by the governor, though the body may override the veto with the approval two-thirds of the members of each House. The legislature has the power to convene hearings to investigate any matter it desires. Unable to compel testimony from any individual in such instances, or prosecute crimes, or enforce any other desired outcome, such hearings are usually held only to gather information to aid in policy-making and budgeting decisions.

The legislature is responsible for election of the state librarian. During instances of rebellion or foreign invasion, the legislature may suspend the writ of habeas corpus. The House of Representatives is empowered to impeach any state official with the agreement of two-thirds of its members and subject them to a trial in the Senate, which can remove an official from office with the agreement of two-thirds of its members. The legislature can pass amendments to the state constitution with the approval of two-thirds of the members of each house, subject to ratification in a popular referendum.

== Political dynamics ==
Bills typically have to be passed out of committee before being passed by the legislature. A chair of a committee can choose not to bring up the bill for a vote before the committee or a full house and thus let it expire. The chairs of the Finance Committee in the Senate and the Ways and Means Committee and Appropriations Committee in the House often exercise significant influence over legislation. Mississippi judges have usually deferred to the legislature on legal questions involving its internal decisions and operations; such things are not subject to regular judicial review.

In 2011, 63% of the seats in the legislature had candidates with no significant opposition in upcoming elections. In 2023, that figure was 85%. That year the Associated Press stated that this "raises questions about the ability of American voters to hold their elected representatives accountable."

== See also ==
- Political party strength in Mississippi for party compositions

== Works cited ==
- Rowland, Dunbar (1908). The Official and Statistical Register of the State of Mississippi. Department of Archives and History.
- Winkle, John W. III (2014). The Mississippi State Constitution (second ed.). Oxford University Press. ISBN 9780199300631.
