= Lincoln County shootings =

Spree shooting in Mississippi, U.S.

- Lincoln County (Mississippi) Lincoln County (the United States)
- Location: Lincoln County, Mississippi, U.S.
- Date: May 27, 2017; 11:30 p.m. (CDT)
- Attack type: Spree shooting, mass shooting and mass murder
- Weapons: Smith & Wesson .40 caliber handgun; Zastava Kalashnikov rifle; .300 blackout AR-15 (SBR)
- Deaths: 8
- Injuries: 1 (the perpetrator)
- Perpetrator: Willie Cory Godbolt

A fatal spree shooting occurred on May 27, 2017, when a gunman opened fire across various locations in Lincoln County, Mississippi. The perpetrator, who was later identified as thirty-five-year-old Willie Cory Godbolt shot and killed eight people across multiple locations. One victim was Lincoln County Deputy William Durr. During a shootout, Godbolt sustained an injury to his arm. It remains the deadliest mass shooting by a lone gunman in Mississippi history.

Godbolt received said injury during a shootout with a civilian homeowner. He was subsequently stopped after the shootout, and subsequently arrested after being found far away from the initial locations where the killings occurred.

== Shootings ==
=== Preceding events ===
On the day of the shooting, Godbolt dropped his two children off at his wife's mother's house in Bogue Chitto for a Memorial Day weekend family barbeque. Later that evening, Godbolt sent a text to his wife, telling her that he was coming to pick up his children. The wife texted back to Godbolt that she is going to leave him because he had abused her. She also texted to Godbolt that if he comes to the house, she would call the police.

Godbolt later arrived at the house and his wife called 911 to remove him. When Godbolt arrived, he told the family that he was going to pick up the children. Godbolt's father-in-law told him to pick up the children the next morning. Eventually, deputy William Durr arrived, asking that Godbolt leave the house. Godbolt tried tricking him, but the attempt was unsuccessful. Durr tried asking Godbolt to leave the house again. After the second request, Godbolt turned towards the door as if he was going to depart.

=== Bogue Chitto shooting ===
At around 11:30 p.m., Godbolt quickly turned around and shot deputy Durr in the face with a concealed gun. He quickly fired two more shots into Durr as he tried crawling away, killing him. Godbolt then moved towards the house's kitchen and opened fire at Brenda and Toccara May, killing Brenda with five shots and killing Toccara with nine shots. After shooting the two women, Godbolt returned to the living room and shot his mother-in-law, Barbara Mitchell, to death with eight shots. As Godbolt was shooting, his wife escaped with her children through a bedroom window. Godbolt's father-in-law ran to his bedroom to hide from Godbolt. Godbolt fired shots through the door of his father-in-law's bedroom. At some point, Godbolt exited the house to retrieve one of his rifles from the trunk of his car before continuing his shooting. He also stole his wife's cellphone during the shooting.

Another deputy arrived at the house after several 911 calls related to the shooting were received. The deputy parked his patrol car behind Durr's vehicle and began moving towards the house. Moments later, Godbolt exited the house and opened fire at the deputy. The deputy exchanged fire with Godbolt before there was a sudden stop in the gunfire. The deputy took the time to retrieve a rifle from the trunk of his car before noticing he lost sight of Godbolt. The deputy believed Godbolt barricaded himself in the home and called for backup. Several officers arrived and initiated a standoff at the house, unaware that Godbolt had run away into the woods surrounding the house.

At midnight, Godbolt arrived at the house of a woman. He knocked on the door and tricked the woman into opening it by making her think he was a neighbor. Godbolt pushed past the woman and threatened her to drive him around while raising his two rifles in each arm. During the encounter, Godbolt told her: "I done fucked up. I done shot the police". The woman and Godbolt both left the house and drove together in her van. She eventually stopped at a parking lot of a hotel in McComb. Godbolt started calling his sister and told her about the shooting at Bogue Chitto. Godbolt's sister proceeded to connect the call to their cousin, who was the chief deputy. Godbolt still pretended to be in the house in Bogue Chitto while he called his sister and cousin. After the call ended, the woman ended up driving Godbolt to his friend's house.

Godbolt left his weapons in the van and entered the house with the woman. In the house, he had a conversation with the woman and his friend. Godbolt confessed to his friend about the murders he committed at Bogue Chitto. The friend urged Godbolt to turn himself in. Eventually, Godbolt, the woman, and his friend left the house together and entered the woman's van. Godbolt ordered the woman to drive to the Blackwell family home at Coopertown Road in Brookhaven. Godbolt told the two about his plans to talk to his second cousin, the father of the Blackwell family, before turning himself in.

=== Coopertown Road shooting ===
After the van arrived at the house, Godbolt's friend exited the van to retrieve Godbolt's second cousin. Godbolt picked up his weapons and also got out of the van. Godbolt's friend noticed the weapons and tried wrestling Godbolt. Godbolt pointed his rifle at his friend, making him back away. Godbolt walked up to the door and knocked on it before opening fire through the door. Godbolt shot open the door and entered the house. In the house, several teenagers were playing video games and cards. Godbolt's second cousin and his wife were nowhere to be seen as they had driven to the shooting scene at Bogue Chitto. The teenagers at the house began to hide after hearing the gunshots outside. In the house, Godbolt walked up to Jordan Blackwell and asked him where his parents were. Blackwell told Godbolt that they had left to go to Bogue Chitto. Godbolt began firing multiple rounds at the people in the house. He killed Jordan Blackwell with four shots and killed Austin Edwards with four shots. After shooting the two victims, Godbolt asked for vehicle keys. A teenager provided Godbolt with keys to a gold Mercury Grand Marquis, but Godbolt decided to kidnap the teenager. Godbolt entered the Grand Marquis with the teen and forced him to drive.

While in the car with the teen, Godbolt used his wife's cellphone to send messages to the mother of the Blackwell family. He taunted her on Facebook while using his wife's account. Godbolt also commanded the teen to drive to several locations. He first made him stop at a Walmart before making him stop at the first shooting scene at Bogue Chitto. He then forced the teen to stop outside a house in Bogue Chitto. At the house, Godbolt held two men at gunpoint and forced them to hand over the keys to a Kia Forte. Godbolt left in the Forte along with the teenager. Godbolt then made the teenager stop at his aunt's house. At his aunt's house, Godbolt walked up to his younger brother and held the teenager at gunpoint. He demanded keys to a car and started counting down from five. Not wanting the teenager to die, Godbolt's younger brother gave Godbolt the keys to a Nissan Altima. Godbolt forced his teenage hostage to the Altima and forced him to drive to the Burage family home at East Lincoln Road in Brookhaven.

=== East Lincoln Road shooting and arrest ===
At the house, Godbolt ordered the teenager to drive away after dropping him off at the driveway. The teenager drove off in the Altima after dropping off Godbolt. Godbolt walked up to the door and knocked. At the other side of the door, Ferral Burage asked who was there. Godbolt only replied "it's me". Ferral responded with a question before Godbolt began firing through the door. Ferral pulled out his own .40 caliber Smith & Wesson handgun and fired back at Godbolt, hitting him in the arm. Despite being wounded, Godbolt was still able to kill Ferral Burage with twelve shots. Godbolt forced open the door and walked into Sheila Burage's bedroom. He forced open the door to the bathroom and killed Sheila Burage with two shots.

After killing the two, Godbolt called his older brother. He confessed to killing Ferral and Sheila Burage and told him that he was in the house at East Lincoln Road. He also told his brother that he was shot and requested him to take care of his children. Godbolt dropped his weapons inside the home and exited the house. At 6:17 a.m., police found Godbolt standing just off the road. They ordered him to lie on the ground and arrested him.

=== Summary ===
At the house in Bogue Chitto, deputy William Durr, a 36-year-old police officer, along with Barbara Mitchell, and Brenda and Toccara May were murdered. At the house in Brookhaven, 18-year old Jordan Blackwell and 11-year old Austin Edwards were killed. A 15-year old survived by playing dead. At another home Ferral and Sheila Burage were killed. Ferral fired four times at the shooter, striking him once in the arm, before he and Shelia were killed by numerous bullets. Four weapons were found at the crime scenes by investigators – 2 .40 caliber Smith & Wesson handguns, and 2 assault-style rifles, a .300 Blackout and a Zastava Serbia. In court testimony, the Blackout was described only as "an AR-type gun", the Zastava Serbia was described only as "an AK-type firearm". One of the handguns found at a crime scene was owned by Burrage, not by Godbolt.

The perpetrator, 35-year-old Cory Godbolt, was shot and wounded by police and taken to hospital for treatment. At the same time, being arrested, Godbolt told a reporter that he had intended to commit suicide by cop and deserved to die for his actions. Godbolt's wife and their children were unharmed.

== Perpetrator ==
Willie Cory Godbolt

The perpetrator of the shootings, Willie Cory Godbolt (born May 1, 1982), then 35, has an extensive criminal record dating back to 2005, including arrests for armed robbery, aggravated assault, simple assault, driving with a suspended license, and disorderly conduct. He was most recently arrested in 2016 for assault. Godbolt was described by a relative as having "episodes" before the shooting.

External videos
- Exclusive: Suspect confesses to C-L reporter; 8 dead, including deputy

Godbolt stated to reporter Therese Apel from The Clarion-Ledger, who interviewed him during his arrest, that he had gone to the Bogue Chitto house to talk with his estranged wife, her mother, and stepfather about taking his children back home and that one of them called the police, ultimately leading to the shooting. Apel's video also documents him appearing to tell authorities where to find Sheila Burrage's body and saying that he would tell police where all the victims were if they would get a deputy off his back.

Godbolt was formally indicted in March 2018. His trial started on February 15, 2020. On February 25, 2020, he was convicted of multiple counts of capital murder for the shootings. Two days later, Godbolt was sentenced to death. Godbolt is currently confined at Mississippi State Penitentiary in Sunflower County.

On March 8, 2024, the Mississippi Supreme Court confirmed the death sentences and eight murder convictions meted out in Godbolt's case.

On April 28, 2025, Godbolt's appeal was denied by the U.S. Supreme Court.

== See also ==
- 2023 Arkabutla shootings
- List of death row inmates in the United States § Mississippi
