= 2025 in Mississippi =

- Decades: 2000s; 2010s; 2020s
- See also: History of Mississippi; Historical outline of Mississippi; List of years in Mississippi; 2025 in the United States

The following is a list of events of the year 2025 in Mississippi.

== Incumbents ==
=== State government ===
- Governor: Tate Reeves (R)

== Events ==
- March 10 – Three people, including two hospital workers, are killed when a medical transport helicopter crashes in a forested area near Tupelo.
- March 11:
  - 2025 Mississippi House of Representatives District 23 special election
  - 2025 Mississippi House of Representatives District 82 special election
- April 1 – June 3: 2025 Mississippi local elections
- June 25 – Richard Gerald Jordan is executed by lethal injection for the 1976 kidnapping and murder of a woman in the De Soto National Forest.
- August 21 – The Mississippi health department declares a public health emergency in response to rising infant mortality rates in the state.
- September 15 – 21-year-old Black Delta State University student Trey Reed is found hanging from a tree on campus in Cleveland. On the same day, 35-year-old homeless White man Corey Zukatis is found hanging from a tree in Vicksburg. Authorities investigate both deaths as suicides.
- September 26 – Parts of Mississippi, Alabama, and Louisiana experience 911 outages. AT&T reports the outages were caused by fiber cuts made by "third-parties".
- October 10
  - Seven people are killed and 24 injured in a mass shooting in Leland following a local high school's homecoming football game.
  - Two people are shot and killed on the Heidelberg High School campus in Heidelberg during a homecoming football game. An 18-year-old man is arrested for the shooting.
- October 28 – A truck carrying Rhesus monkeys for research crashes north of Heidelberg. Three of the monkeys escape; two are later shot and killed by civilians.
- October 30 – 20 people, including 14 law enforcement officers, are arrested by the FBI in connection to a drug trafficking conspiracy. The arrested individuals include the sheriffs of Washington and Humphreys Counties.
- November 4 – 2025 Mississippi State Senate election: Democrats pick up one seat in the Mississippi House and two in the Senate. The gains in the senate break the Republican supermajority.
- December 19 – A judge orders special elections for the Mississippi Supreme Court, finding that the current map used to select justices violates the Voting Rights Act.

== See also ==
- 2025 in the United States
