= Reta Holden =

American politician (1938–2026)

Reta Faye Eaves Holden (August 7, 1938 – February 3, 2026) was an American politician.

== Life and career ==
Reta Faye Eaves was born on August 7, 1938, to Odie Lee and Floy Triplett Eaves. She served as a member of the Mississippi House of Representatives (1992–1999). In 2015, she unsuccessfully ran for the District 34 of the Mississippi House of Representatives, losing to Kevin Horan.

Holden died on February 3, 2026, at the age of 87.
