= Victoria Gray =

First patient to be treated by gene-editing

Victoria Gray is an American woman who was the first patient ever to be treated with the gene-editing tool CRISPR for sickle-cell disease.

This marked the initial indication that a cure is attainable for individuals born with sickle-cell disease and another severe blood disorder, beta-thalassemia.

== Procedure ==
In 2019, Victoria Gray enrolled in a groundbreaking clinical trial. In an interview with National Public Radio, Gray mentioned that she had been contemplating a bone marrow transplantation when she learned about the trial.

Serving as the inaugural patient with sickle cell disease to undergo treatment using the revolutionary gene-editing technology CRISPR, she became one of the earliest individuals to experience CRISPR intervention. Although CRISPR had been extensively discussed and lauded, its application had primarily been confined to laboratory cell manipulation.

When Gray received her experimental infusion, the outcome was uncertain—scientists were unsure if it would eradicate her disease or pose unforeseen risks. However, the therapy exceeded all expectations and at the end of July 2019, Gray was announced as the first patient to be treated for sickle-cell disease using the CRISPR-Cas9 gene-editing technology.

Thanks to her gene-edited cells, Gray has been cured of the disease and now lives a symptom-free life. In the trial, over 96% of the eligible patients (29 out of 30) witnessed a remarkable shift, transitioning from experiencing multiple pain crises annually to none in the 12 months following treatment.
