= 2027 Mississippi House of Representatives election =

2027 Mississippi House of Representatives special election
- November 2, 2027

All 122 seats in the Mississippi House of Representatives 62 seats needed for a majority
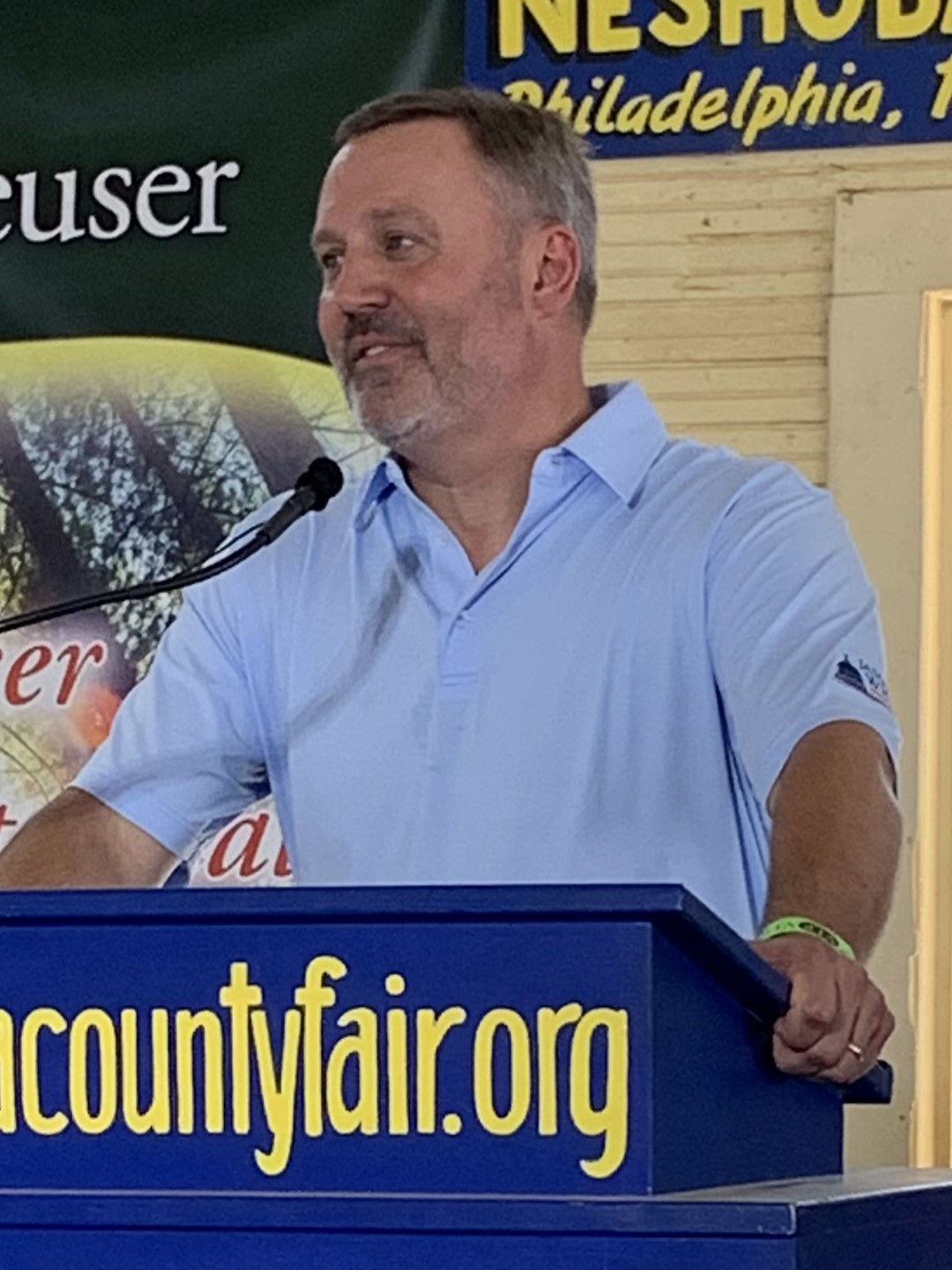

Leader	Jason White	Robert Johnson III
Party	Republican	Democratic	Independents
Leader since	January 2, 2024	January 7, 2020	N/A
Leader's seat	48th district	94th district	N/A
Current seats	78	42	2
- Map of the incumbents: Republican incumbent Democratic incumbent Independent incumbent Vacant
Incumbent Speaker
Jason White
Republican

The 2027 Mississippi House of Representatives election will be held on November 2, 2027, to elect all 122 members of the Mississippi House of Representatives.

== See also ==
- 2027 Mississippi State Senate election
