= 2027 Mississippi State Senate election =

- November 2, 2027

All 52 seats in the Mississippi State Senate 27 seats needed for a majority
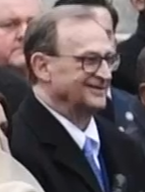

Leader	Dean Kirby (retiring)	Derrick Simmons
Party	Republican	Democratic
Leader since	January 7, 2020	July 31, 2017
Leader's seat	30th district	12th district
Current seats	34	18
- Map of the incumbents: Republican incumbent Democratic incumbent Vacant
Incumbent President pro tempore
Dean Kirby
Republican

The 2027 Mississippi State Senate election will be held on Tuesday, November 2, 2027, to elect all 52 members of the Mississippi State Senate to four-year terms. The primary will be held on August 3, 2027.

== Requirements ==
In order to serve in the Mississippi Legislature, candidates must be at least 25 years of age and have resided in Mississippi in the four previous years and in their district or county for two years.

State legislative candidates who seek a party nomination must file a statement of intent and pay a $250 fee to their desired political party. Independent candidates for the state legislature must file by petition and collect at least 50 signatures from registered voters in their district. Either must be submitted by March 1 on the year of the election.

== Election schedule ==
- August 3, 2027: Primary election
- August 31, 2027: Primary runoff
- November 2, 2027: General election
- November 30, 2027: General runoff

== Retirements ==
=== Republicans ===
- District 5: Daniel Sparks, running for State Auditor
- District 17: Charles Younger, running for Transportation Commission Northern District
- District 23: Briggs Hopson
- District 30: Dean Kirby

== See also ==
- 2027 Mississippi House of Representatives election
