= 2023 Arkabutla shootings =

Spree killings in Arkabutla, Mississippi, U.S.

- Arkabutla (Mississippi) Arkabutla (the United States)
- Location: 34.698889°N 90.122222°W; Arkabutla in Tate County, Mississippi, U.S.
- Date: February 17, 2023 ≈ 11:00 a.m. (CST)
- Attack type: Spree shooting
- Weapons: · Two handguns; · 12-gauge shotgun
- Deaths: 6
- Injuries: 1 (by pistol-whipping)
- Motive: Under investigation
- Accused: Richard Dale Crum

On February 17, 2023, a spree shooting occurred in Arkabutla, Mississippi, United States. Six people were killed, and a seventh was injured. The suspect, 52-year-old Richard Dale Crum, was later arrested and charged with first-degree murder.

== Shootings ==
At approximately 11:00 a.m. on February 17, 2023, the perpetrator pulled into the parking lot of a convenience store called Express mart Gas station and shot into the car adjacent to him, killing a man. The victim had no connection to the attacker. There was also another person in the vehicle, but that individual was left unharmed. The suspect then drove to the house of his ex-wife, and shot her to death. He also struck her fiancé with a gun but did not shoot him. The shooter proceeded to drive to the residence behind the house, where he fatally shot his stepfather and stepfather's sister. After, the perpetrator fatally shot two men on a road behind Crum's house. The two victims were identified as his stepfather's cousin and also a family friend there to help repair the roof.

A sheriff's deputy saw a car matching the description of the suspect's car. After attempting to pull over the car failed, the deputy followed the vehicle until it stopped in a driveway of the suspect's home. There, the deputy arrested Crum as he attempted to leave the scene on foot.

== Victims ==
Six people were killed, three of whom had a connection to the accused.

They were identified as:

- Chris Boyce, 59
- Debra Crum, 60
- Charles Manuel, 76
- George McCain, 73
- Lynda McCain, 78
- John Rorie, 59

== Suspect ==
The suspect was identified as 52-year-old former Illinois resident Richard Dale Crum (born January 1970), who was a resident of neighboring Coldwater at the time of the killings. Crum was born and raised in Rock Falls, Illinois, and lived in various other towns in the state throughout parts of his life. A family friend told CBS News that Crum had a history of mental illness.

== Legal proceedings ==
Crum has been charged with murder and the prosecution says they are seeking the death penalty. On 2 October 2025, Crum was found to be "presently incompetent to stand trial" and remanded to Mississippi State Hospital for competency restoration.

== See also ==
- List of mass shootings in the United States in 2023
