= Outline of Mississippi =

Overview of and topical guide to Mississippi

The flag of Mississippi

The seal of Mississippi

Coat of arms of Mississippi

The location of the state of Mississippi in the United States of America

The following outline is provided as an overview of and topical guide to the U.S. state of Mississippi:

Mississippi – U.S. state located in the Southern United States, named after the Mississippi River which flows along its western boundary. The capital is Jackson, which is also the state's largest city. The state is heavily forested outside of the Mississippi Delta area, which had been cleared for cotton cultivation in the 19th century.

== General reference ==
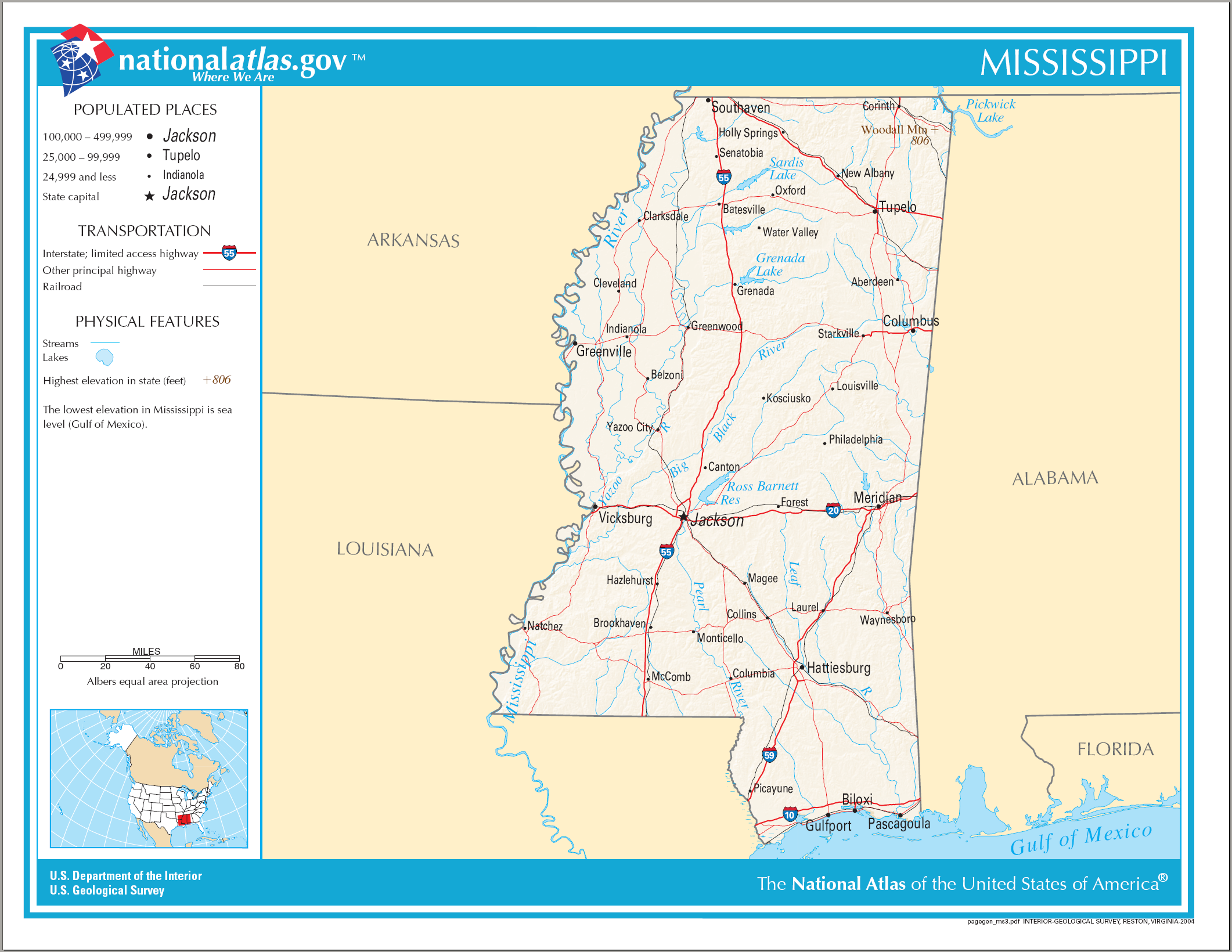
An enlargeable map of the state of Mississippi

- Names
  - Common name: Mississippi
    - Pronunciation: /ˌmɪsɪˈsɪpi/
  - Official name: State of Mississippi
  - Abbreviations and name codes
    - Postal symbol: MS
    - ISO 3166-2 code: US-MS
    - Internet second-level domain: .ms.us
  - Nicknames
    - Hospitality State (previously used on license plates)
    - Magnolia State
- Adjectival: Mississippi
- Demonym: Mississippian

== Geography of Mississippi ==
Geography of Mississippi

- Mississippi is: a U.S. state, a federal state of the United States of America
- Location
  - Northern Hemisphere
  - Western Hemisphere
    - Americas
      - North America
        - Anglo America
        - Northern America
          - United States of America
            - Contiguous United States
              - Central United States
                - East South Central States
              - Western United States
              - Southern United States
                - Deep South
                  - Gulf Coast of the United States
                - South Central United States
- Population of Mississippi: 2,967,297 (2010 U.S. Census)
- Area of Mississippi: 48,434 sq mi (125,443 km^{2})
- Atlas of Mississippi

=== Places in Mississippi ===
- Historic places in Mississippi
  - National Historic Landmarks in Mississippi
  - National Register of Historic Places listings in Mississippi
    - Bridges on the National Register of Historic Places in Mississippi
- National Natural Landmarks in Mississippi
- National parks in Mississippi
- State parks in Mississippi

=== Environment of Mississippi ===
- Climate of Mississippi
- Superfund sites in Mississippi

==== Natural geographic features of Mississippi ====
- Rivers of Mississippi

=== Regions of Mississippi ===
- Southern Mississippi

==== Administrative divisions of Mississippi ====
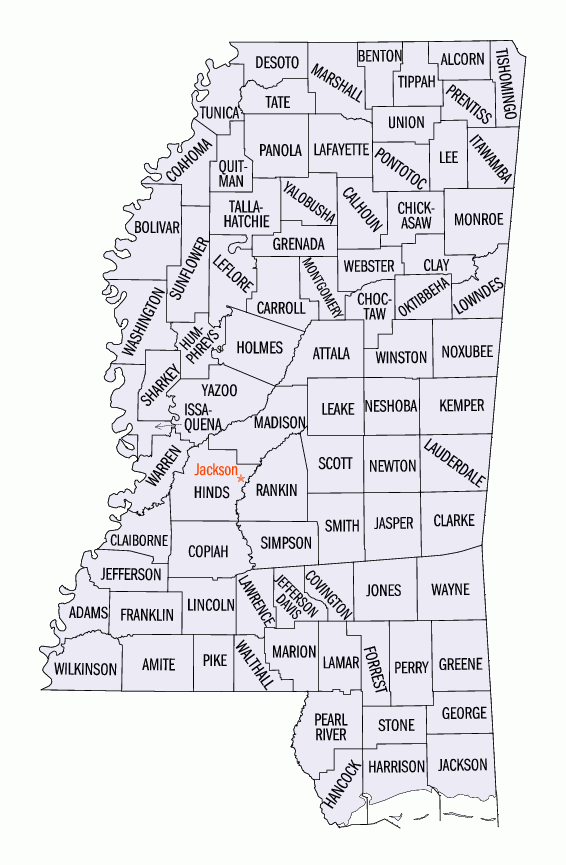
An enlargeable map of the 82 counties of the state of Mississippi

- The 82 counties of the state of Mississippi
  - Municipalities in Mississippi
    - Cities in Mississippi
      - State capital of Mississippi:
      - City nicknames in Mississippi
  - Census-designated places in Mississippi

=== Demography of Mississippi ===
Demographics of Mississippi

== Government and politics of Mississippi ==
Government of Mississippi

- Form of government: U.S. state government
- Mississippi's congressional delegations
- Mississippi State Capitol
- Elections in Mississippi
- Political party strength in Mississippi

=== Branches of the government of Mississippi ===
Government of Mississippi

==== Executive branch of the government of Mississippi ====
- Governor of Mississippi
  - Lieutenant Governor of Mississippi
  - Secretary of State of Mississippi
  - State Treasurer of Mississippi
- State departments
  - Mississippi Department of Transportation

==== Legislative branch of the government of Mississippi ====
- Mississippi Legislature (bicameral)
  - Upper house: Mississippi Senate
  - Lower house: Mississippi House of Representatives

==== Judicial branch of the government of Mississippi ====
Courts of Mississippi

- Supreme Court of Mississippi

=== Law and order in Mississippi ===
Law of Mississippi

- Cannabis in Mississippi
- Capital punishment in Mississippi
  - Individuals executed in Mississippi
- Constitution of Mississippi
- Crime in Mississippi
- Gun laws in Mississippi
- Law enforcement in Mississippi
  - Law enforcement agencies in Mississippi

=== Military in Mississippi ===
- Mississippi Air National Guard
- Mississippi Army National Guard

== History of Mississippi ==
History of Mississippi

=== History of Mississippi, by period ===
- Prehistory of Mississippi
  - Indigenous peoples
- Spanish colony of Florida, 1565–1763
- French colony of Louisiane, 1699–1763
- British Colony of Georgia, 1732–1776
- French and Indian War, 1754–1763
  - Treaty of Paris of 1763
- British Colony of West Florida south of latitude 32°22′N, 1763–1783
- British Indian Reserve north of latitude 32°22′N, 1763–1783
  - Royal Proclamation of 1763
- American Revolutionary War, April 19, 1775 – September 3, 1783
  - United States Declaration of Independence, July 4, 1776
  - Treaty of Paris, September 3, 1783
- Territorial claims of State of Georgia from 31st parallel north to 35th parallel north, 1776–1802
- Spanish colony of Florida Occidental, 1783–1821
  - Treaty of San Lorenzo of 1795
  - Republic of West Florida, 1810
- Territory of Mississippi, 1798–1817
  - War of 1812, June 18, 1812 – March 23, 1815
    - United States unilaterally annexes Mobile District of Spanish Florida Occidental, 1812
    - Treaty of Ghent, December 24, 1814
  - Creek War, 1813–1814
- State of Mississippi becomes 20th State admitted to the United States of America on December 10, 1817
  - First Seminole War, 1817–1818
  - Adams–Onís Treaty of 1819
  - Trail of Tears, 1830–1838
  - Mexican–American War, April 25, 1846 – February 2, 1848
    - Second state to declare secession from the United States on January 9, 1861
    - Founding state of the Confederate States of America on February 8, 1861
  - American Civil War, April 12, 1861 – May 13, 1865
    - Mississippi in the American Civil War
      - Siege of Corinth, April 29 – May 30, 1862
      - Siege of Vicksburg, May 18 – July 4, 1863
  - Mississippi in Reconstruction, 1865–1870
      - Ninth former Confederate state readmitted to the United States on February 23, 1870

=== History of Mississippi, by region ===
- by city
  - History of Jackson, Mississippi
  - History of Meridian, Mississippi
  - History of Oxford, Mississippi
- by county

=== History of Mississippi, by subject ===
- History of the Italians in Mississippi
- List of Mississippi state legislatures

== Culture of Mississippi ==
Culture of Mississippi

- Museums in Mississippi
- Religion in Mississippi
  - The Church of Jesus Christ of Latter-day Saints in Mississippi
  - Episcopal Diocese of Mississippi
- Scouting in Mississippi
- State symbols of Mississippi
  - Flag of the State of Mississippi
  - Great Seal of the State of Mississippi

=== The Arts in Mississippi ===
- Music of Mississippi

=== Sports in Mississippi ===
Sports in Mississippi

== Economy and infrastructure of Mississippi ==
Economy of Mississippi

- Communications in Mississippi
  - Newspapers in Mississippi
  - Radio stations in Mississippi
  - Television stations in Mississippi
- Health care in Mississippi
  - Hospitals in Mississippi
- Transportation in Mississippi
  - Airports in Mississippi
  - Roads in Mississippi
    - Interstate Highways in Mississippi

== Education in Mississippi ==
Education in Mississippi

- Schools in Mississippi
  - School districts in Mississippi
    - High schools in Mississippi
  - Private schools in Mississippi
  - Colleges and universities in Mississippi
    - University of Mississippi
    - Mississippi State University

== See also ==
- Topic overview:
  - Mississippi
  - Index of Mississippi-related articles
