= History of Mississippi =

The history of the state of Mississippi extends back to thousands of years of indigenous peoples. Evidence of their cultures has been found largely through archeological excavations, as well as existing remains of earthwork mounds built thousands of years ago. Native American traditions were kept through oral histories; with Europeans recording the accounts of historic peoples they encountered. Since the late 20th century, there have been increased studies of the Native American tribes and reliance on their oral histories to document their cultures. Their accounts have been correlated with evidence of natural events.

Initial colonization of the region was carried out by the French. France ceded its control over portions of the region to Spain and Britain, particularly along the Gulf Coast. European-American settlers did not enter the territory in great number until the early 19th century. Rich American settlers brought many enslaved Africans with them to serve as laborers to develop cotton plantations along major riverfronts. On December 10, 1817, Mississippi became a state of the United States. Through the 1830s, the federal government bought out most of the native Choctaw and Chickasaw tribes west of the Mississippi River. American planters developed an economy based on the export of cotton produced by slave labor along the Mississippi and Yazoo rivers. A small elite group of planters controlled most of the richest land, the wealth, and politics of the state; Mississippi seceded in 1861 and joined the Confederate States of America. During the American Civil War (1861–1865), control of the Mississippi River was a vital goal of both sides, with the Union in control by 1863. The Union Army had full control by 1865 and slavery was abolished. Mississippi entered the Reconstruction era (1865–1877).

The bottomlands of the Mississippi Delta were still 90% undeveloped after the Civil War. Thousands of migrants, both black and white, entered this area for a chance at land ownership. They sold timber while clearing land to raise money for purchases. During the Reconstruction era, many freedmen became owners of small farms in these areas, and by 1900, composed two-thirds of the property owners in the Mississippi Delta. Democrats regained control of the state in 1875 and in 1890 passed a disfranchising constitution, resulting in the exclusion of African Americans from political life until the mid-1960s. In the era of Jim Crow laws Blacks lost all political power and social status. The postwar sharp decline in cotton prices hurt the state economy. There was growth in the lumber industry, and railroads were built. However, there were few factories or cities. By 1900, African Americans in the state were typically farm laborers or landless sharecroppers or tenant farmers. The state continued to rely mostly on agriculture and timber, but by the 1940s mechanization meant the end of a demand for labor to pick cotton.

During the 1910 to 1960 period two waves of the Great Migration led to hundreds of thousands of blacks leaving the state for cities in the North, such as St. Louis and Chicago. By 1930 African Americans were a minority of the state population. They were still a majority in the cotton-growing Delta counties. The Civil Rights Movement during the 1950s and 1960s saw African Americans organize. Thanks to new federal laws in the 1960s they recovered their rights for access to public facilities, including all state universities, and the ability to register, vote, and run for office. Public places and schools were desegregated.

By the early 21st century Mississippi had made notable progress in overcoming attitudes that had impeded social, economic, and political development. In 2005, Hurricane Katrina caused severe damage along Mississippi's Gulf Coast. The tourism industry grew in the early 21st century. Mississippi expanded its professional services in cities such as Jackson, the state capital. Top industries in Mississippi today include agriculture, forestry, manufacturing, transportation and utilities, and health services. The social base of politics changed in the late 20th century as Blacks joined the liberal Democratic Party, and Whites largely switched to the conservative Republican Party.

== Native Americans ==
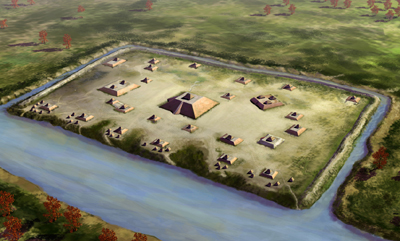
Holly Bluff site, located in Yazoo County, Mississippi

At the end of the last Ice Age, Native Americans or Paleo-Indians appeared in what today is the Southern United States. Paleo-Indians in the South were hunter-gatherers who pursued the megafauna that became extinct following the end of the Pleistocene age. A variety of indigenous cultures arose in the region, including some that built great earthwork mounds more than 2,000 years ago.

The successive mound building Troyville, Coles Creek, and Plaquemine cultures occupied western Mississippi bordering the Mississippi River during the Late Woodland period. During the Terminal Coles Creek period (1150 to 1250 CE) contact increased with Mississippian cultures centered upriver near St. Louis, Missouri. This led to the adaption of new pottery techniques, as well as new ceremonial objects and possibly new forms of social structuring. As more Mississippian culture influences were absorbed the Plaquemine area as a distinct culture began to shrink after 1350 CE. Eventually the last enclave of purely Plaquemine culture was the Natchez Bluffs area, while the Yazoo Basin and adjacent areas of Louisiana became a hybrid Plaquemine-Mississippian culture. Historic groups in the area during first European contact bear out this division. In the Natchez Bluffs, the Taensa and Natchez had held out against Mississippian influence and continued to use the same sites as their ancestors and carry on the Plaquemine culture. Groups who appear to have absorbed more Mississippian influence were identified at the time of European contact as those tribes speaking the Tunican, Chitimachan, and Muskogean languages.

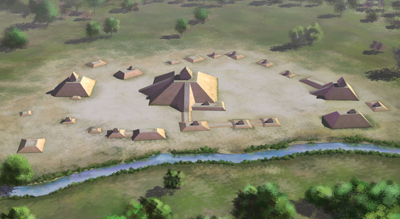
Winterville Mounds, near Greenville, Mississippi

The Mississippian culture disappeared in most places around the time of European encounter. Archaeological and linguistic evidence has shown their descendants are the historic Chickasaw and Choctaw peoples, who were later counted by colonists as among the Five Civilized Tribes of the Southeast. Other tribes who inhabited the territory that became known as Mississippi (and whose names were given by colonists to local towns and features) include the Natchez, Yazoo, Pascagoula, and the Biloxi. French, Spanish and English settlers all traded with these tribes in the early colonial years.

Pressure from European-American settlers increased during the early nineteenth century, after invention of the cotton gin made cultivation of short-staple cotton profitable. This was readily cultivated in the upland areas of the South, and its development could feed an international demand for cotton in the 19th century. Migrants from the United States entered Mississippi mostly from the north and east, coming from the Upper South and coastal areas. Eventually they gained passage of the Indian Removal Act in 1830, which achieved federal forced removal of most of the indigenous peoples during the 1830s to areas west of the Mississippi River.

== European colonial period ==
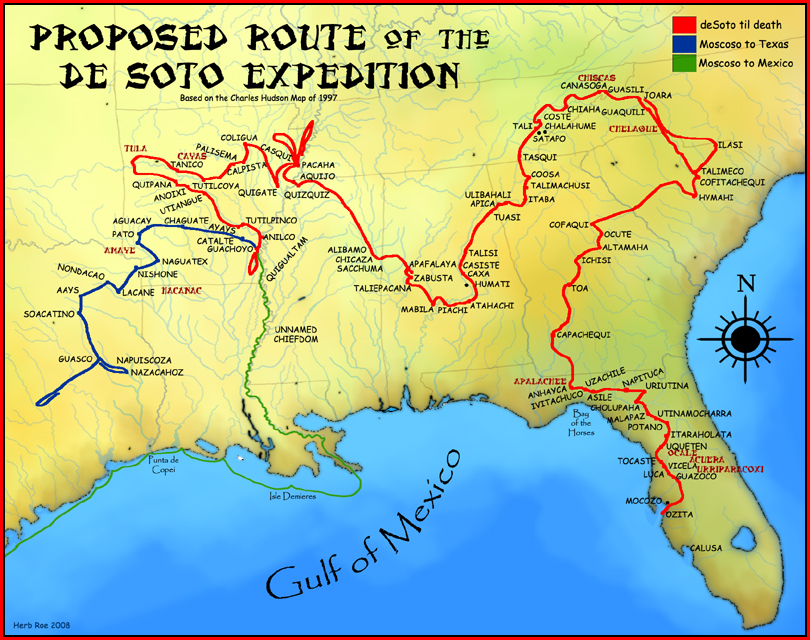
A proposed route for the de Soto Expedition, based on Charles M. Hudson map of 1997

The first major European expedition into the territory that became Mississippi was Spanish, led by Hernando de Soto, which passed through in the early 1540s. The French claimed the territory that included Mississippi as part of their colony of New France and started settlement along the Gulf Coast. They created the first Fort Maurepas under Pierre Le Moyne d'Iberville on the site of modern Ocean Springs (or Old Biloxi) in 1699.

In 1716, the French founded Natchez as Fort Rosalie on the Mississippi River; it became the dominant town and trading post of the area. In this period of the early 18th century, the French Roman Catholic Church created pioneer parishes at Old Biloxi/Ocean Springs and Natchez. The church also established seven pioneer parishes in present-day Louisiana and two in Alabama, which was also part of New France.

The French and later Spanish colonial rule influenced early social relations of the settlers who held enslaved Africans. As in Louisiana, for a period there developed a third class of free people of color. They were chiefly descendants of white European colonists and enslaved African or African-American mothers. The planters often had formally supportive relationships with their mistresses of color, known in French as plaçage. They sometimes freed them and their multiracial children. The fathers passed on property to their mistresses and children, or arranged for the apprenticeship or education of children so they could learn a trade. Some wealthier male colonists sent their mixed-race sons to France for education, and some entered the military there. Free people of color often migrated to New Orleans, where there was more opportunity for work and a bigger community of their class.

As part of New France, Mississippi was also ruled by the Spanish after France's defeat in the Seven Years' War (1756–63). Later it was briefly part of West Florida under the British. In 1783 the Mississippi area was deeded by Great Britain to the United States after the latter won its independence in the American Revolution, under the terms of the Treaty of Paris. Following the Peace of Paris (1783) the southern third of Mississippi came under Spanish rule as part of West Florida.

Through the colonial period, the various tribes of Native Americans changed alliances trying to achieve the best trading and other conditions for themselves.

Historical populations
Census year	Population
1800	7,600
1810	31,306
1820	75,448
1830	136,621
1840	375,651
1850	606,526
1860	791,305
1870	827,922
1880	1,131,597
1890	1,289,600
1900	1,551,270
1910	1,797,114
1920	1,790,618
1930	2,009,821
1940	2,183,796
1950	2,178,914
1960	2,178,141
1970	2,216,912
1980	2,520,638
1990	2,573,216
2000	2,844,658

== Territory and statehood ==
Before 1798 the state of Georgia claimed the entire region extending west from the Chattahoochee to the Mississippi River and tried to sell lands there, most notoriously in the Yazoo land scandal of 1795. After two decades of resistance to the agreement by the Original Thirteen States in adopting the first system of governance for the United States in the old Articles of Confederation and Perpetual Union in 1781, uniting the original Thirteen Colonies during the American Revolutionary War (1775–1783) and requiring that all lands west of the Appalachian Mountains chain were to be ceded by the East Coast states and to held in common by the Confederation Congress for erection of new future states, Georgia finally ceded the disputed area in 1802 to the United States national government for its management. In 1804, after the Louisiana Purchase, the government assigned the northern part of this cession to Mississippi Territory.of 1798 The southern part became attached to the Louisiana Territory (1804–1812) and its southern portion of the Orleans Territory (1804–1812) by the Congress, and after 1812 in the new 18th state of Louisiana when it was admitted to the federal Union under the presidential administration of fourth President of the United States|President] James Madison (1751–1836, served 1809–1817).

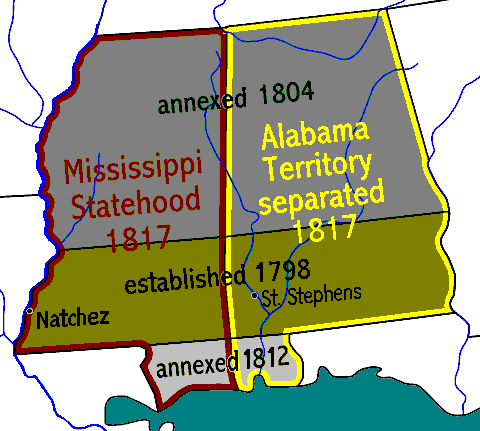

The Mississippi Territory was sparsely populated and suffered initially from a series of difficulties that hampered its development. Long protracted negotiations by American diplomat Thomas Pinckney (1750–1828) finally resulted in Pinckney's Treaty (a.k.a. Treaty of San Lorenzo / Treaty of Madrid) of October 1795. It was ratified by the American Congress sitting in the temporary Capitol of Independence Hall and adjoining Carpenter's Hall and approved / signed by first President, George Washington (1732–1799, served 1789–1797), then in the provisional federal national capital city of Philadelphia, Pennsylvania. It helped to settle the issues about southwest border of the United States with the colonial territory of the Kingdom of Spain and its Spanish Empire in Spanish Florida and West Florida 'and ended total exclusive Spanish control over the Mississippi River, and access at its mouth in the delta to the Gulf of Mexico along the coast. But despite the 1795 Treaty, Spain still continued to hamper the Americans trade in the next decade from further upstream and the states and territories in the interior of the continent, and slowing the territory's growth by harassing commercial traders. It restricted American trading and travel on the Mississippi River down to the river and seaport town of New Orleans, the major port on the Gulf of Mexico and Gulf Coast. The worsening situation between the Americans and Spanish wasn't totally resolved until almost a decade later with the huge expansive Louisiana Purchase of 1803.

Winthrop Sargent (1753–1820, served 1798–1801), appointed first territorial governor in 1798, by second President, John Adams, (17xx-1826, served 1797+1801), proved unable to impose a code of laws. Not until the emergence of cotton as a profitable staple crop in 19th century, after the invention of the revolutionary machine cotton gin by Eli Whitney in the 1790s, were the riverfront areas of Mississippi developed as cotton plantations. These were based on slave labor and developed most intensively along the Mississippi and Yazoo rivers, bordering the lower Mississippi Delta. The rivers offered the best fastest routes of transportation to markets and towns / cities.

Americans had continuing land disputes with the Spanish, even after taking control of much of this territory through the Louisiana Purchase (1803) from France. In 1810, the European-American settlers in parts of West Florida (of Spanish Florida) rebelled and declared their freedom from Kingdom of Spain. fourth President James Madison (1751–1836, served 1809–1817), declared that the region between the Mississippi and Perdido rivers, which included most of West Florida, had already become part of the United States under the terms of the Louisiana Purchase 1803 treaty with Napoleonic France. The far eastern section of the panhandle West Florida between the Pearl and Perdido rivers, known as the District of Mobile, was annexed to Mississippi Territory further north in 1812; Americans from the United States moved south and occupied Kiln, Mississippi, in 1813.

=== Settlement ===
The attraction of vast amounts of high-quality, temperate sub-tropical climate and inexpensive cotton-growing land with a warm temperate sub-tropical climate attracted hordes of settlers, mostly from Georgia and the Carolinas further east and northeast, and from former tobacco-growing areas of Virginia and North Carolina in the Upper South. By this time, most planters in the Upper South had switched to mixed crops, as their lands were exhausted from tobacco and it was barely profitable as a commodity crop.

From 1798 through 1820, the population in the Mississippi Territory rose dramatically, from less than 9,000 to more than 222,000. The vast majority were enslaved African Americans brought by settlers or shipped by slave traders. Migration came in two fairly distinct waves—a steady movement until the outbreak of the War of 1812 (1812–1815), and a flood after it was ended, from 1815 through 1819. The postwar flood was catalyzed by various factors: high prices for cotton, the elimination of Native Americans (Indian) titles to much land, new and improved roads, and the acquisition of new direct water outlets to the Gulf of Mexico. The first migrants were traders and trappers, then herdsmen, and finally farmers. Conditions on the old Southwest frontier initially resulted in a relatively democratic society for whites. But expansion of cotton cultivation resulted in an elite group of white planters who controlled politics in the state for decades.

=== Cotton ===
Expansion of cultivation of cotton into the Deep South was enabled by the invention of the cotton gin, which made processing of short-staple cotton profitable. This type was more readily grown in upland and inland areas, in contrast to the long-staple cotton of the Sea Islands and Lowcountry. Americans pressed to gain more land for cotton, causing conflicts with the several tribes of Native Americans who historically occupied this territory of the Southeast. Five of the major tribes had adopted some western customs and had members who assimilated to varying degrees, often based on proximity and trading relationships with whites.

Through the 1830s, state and federal US governments forced the Five Civilized Tribes to cede their lands. Various US leaders developed proposals for removal of all Native Americans to west of the Mississippi River. This took place following passage of the Indian Removal Act in 1830 by Congress. As Indians ceded their lands to whites through the Southeast, they moved west and became more isolated from the American planter society, where many African Americans were enslaved. The state sold off the ceded lands, and white migration into the state continued. Some families brought slaves with them; most slaves were transported into the area from the Upper South in a forced migration through the domestic slave trade.

=== Statehood ===
In 1817 elected delegates from across the western half of the now 19-year-old Mississippi Territory, wrote a proposed state constitution and applied to Congress for statehood. On December 10, 1817, that western portion of the Mississippi Territory became the State of Mississippi, the 20th state of the federal Union, in an organic act passed by both upper and lower legislative chambers (the Senate and the House of Representatives) of the Congress of the United States meeting at the United States Capitol on Capitol Hill, in the federal national capital city of Washington, D.C. and approved / signed by the new fifth President, James Monroe (1758–1831, served 1817–1825), in 1817, at the Executive Mansion, now newly rebuilt, furnished and white painted scorched / burned sandstone walls, later to become famous known as the White House on 1600 Pennsylvania Avenue.

Natchez, long established as a major river port town on the east bank of the lower Mississippi River, was the first designated state capital town. As more population came into the state and future growth was anticipated, so five years later in 1822, the capital was moved to the more central location of Jackson, where its remained for 202 years ever since.

=== Religion ===
French colonists had established the Catholic Church in their colonial settlements along the coast, such as Biloxi. As Americans entered the territory, they brought their strongly Protestant tradition. Methodists, Baptists, and Presbyterians made up the three leading denominations in the territory, and their congregations rapidly built new churches and chapels. By this time, many slaves were already Christians, attending church under the supervision of white planters. They also developed their own private worship and celebrations on the larger plantations. Adherents to other religions were a distinct minority. Some Protestant ministers won converts and often promoted education, although there was no state public school system until it was authorized after the Civil War by the Reconstruction-era biracial legislature.

Whereas in the first Great Awakening, Protestant ministers of these denominations had promoted abolition of slavery, by the early 19th century, when the Deep South was being developed, most had retreated to support for slavery. They argued instead for an improved paternalism under Christianity by white slaveholders. This sometimes led to improved treatment for the enslaved.

=== Government ===
William C. C. Claiborne (1775–1817), a lawyer and former Republican congressman from Tennessee (1797–1801), was appointed by President Thomas Jefferson as governor and superintendent of Indian affairs in the Mississippi Territory from 1801 through 1803. Although he favored acquiring some land from the Choctaw and Chickasaw, Claiborne was generally sympathetic and conciliatory toward Indians. He worked long and patiently to iron out differences that arose, and to improve the material well-being of the Indians. He was partly successful in promoting the establishment of law and order; his offer of a $2,000 reward helped destroy a gang of outlaws headed by Samuel Mason (1750–1803). His position on issues indicated a national rather than regional outlook, though he did not ignore his constituents. Claiborne expressed the philosophy of the Democratic-Republican Party and helped that party defeat the Federalists. When a smallpox epidemic broke out in the spring of 1802, Claiborne directed the first recorded mass vaccination in the territory. This prevented the spread of the epidemic in Natchez.

=== Native American lands ===
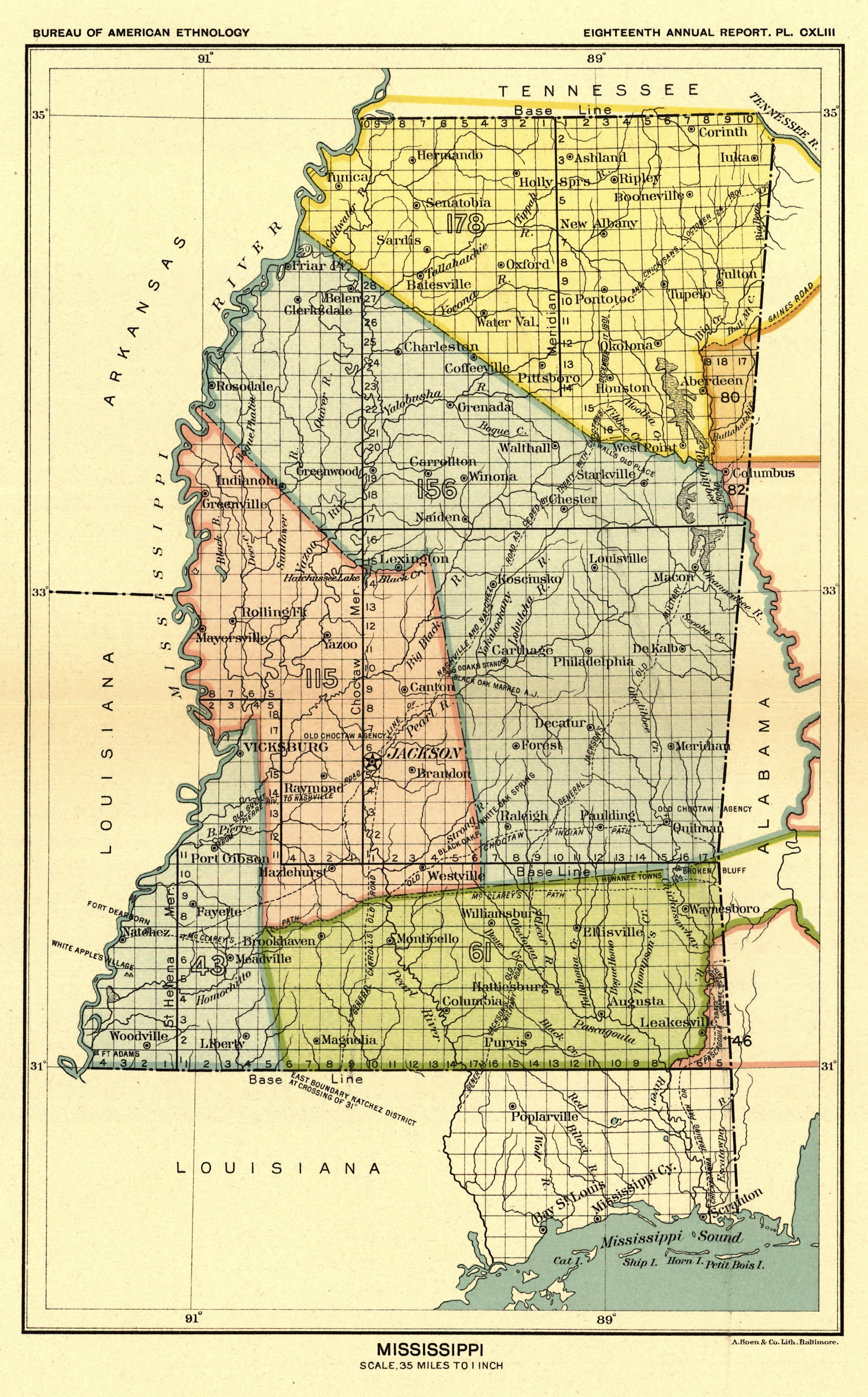
Mississippi map from Indian Land Cessions in the United States (1899) by Charles C. Royce

The United States government removed land from the Chickasaw and Choctaw tribes from 1801 to about 1830, as white settlers entered the territory from coastal states. After Congressional passage of the Indian Removal Act of 1830, the government forced the tribes to accept lands west of the Mississippi River in Indian Territory. Most left the state, but those who remained became United States citizens.

After 1800 the rapid development of a cotton economy and the slave society of the Deep South changed the economic relationship of native Indians with whites and slaves in Mississippi Territory. As Indians ceded their lands to whites in the eastern sections, they moved west in the state, becoming more isolated from whites and blacks. The following table illustrates ceded land in acres:

Treaty	Year	Signed with	Where	Purpose	Ceded land
San Lorenzo	1795	Between Spain and United States	San Lorenzo de El Escorial, Spain	The treaty, also known as Pinckney's Treaty, put Choctaw & Chickasaw country under U.S. control	n/a
Fort Adams	1801	Choctaw	Mississippi Territory	Redefined Choctaw cession to England and permission for whites to use the Natchez Trace	2,641,920 acres (10,691.5 km^{2})
Fort Confederation	1802	Choctaw	Mississippi Territory	n/a	10,000 acres (40 km^{2})
Hoe Buckintoopa	1803	Choctaw	Choctaw Nation	Small cession of Tombigbee River and redefined English treaty of 1765	853,760 acres (3,455.0 km^{2})
Mount Dexter	1805	Choctaw	Choctaw Nation	Large cession from Natchez District to the Tombigbee/Alabama River watershed	4,142,720 acres (16,765.0 km^{2})
Fort St. Stephens	1816	Choctaw	Fort Confederation	Ceded all Choctaw land east of Tombigbee River	10,000 acres (40 km^{2})
Doak's Stand	1820	Choctaw	Natchez Trace, Choctaw Nation	Exchanged cession in Mississippi for parcel in Arkansas	5,169,788 acres (20,921.39 km^{2})
Washington City	1825	Choctaw	Exchanged Arkansas land for Oklahoma parcel	2,000,000 acres (8,100 km^{2})	
Dancing Rabbit Creek	1830	Choctaw	Choctaw Nation	Removal and granting U.S. citizenship to Choctaw who remained	10,523,130 acres (42,585.6 km^{2})
Pontotoc	1832	Chickasaw	Pontitock Creek	Seek a home in the west	6,283,804 acres (25,429.65 km^{2})

== Antebellum period ==
The exit of most of the Native Americans meant that vast new lands were open to settlement, and tens of thousands of immigrant Americans poured in. Men with money brought slaves and purchased the best cotton lands in the Delta region along the Mississippi River. Poor men took up poor lands in the rest of the state, but the vast majority of the state was still undeveloped at the time of the Civil War.

=== Cotton ===
By the 1830s Mississippi was a leading cotton producer, increasing its demand for enslaved labor. Some planters considered slavery a "necessary evil" to make cotton production profitable, for the survival of the cotton economy, and were brought in from the border states and the tobacco states where slavery was declining. The 1832 state constitution forbade any further importation of slaves by the domestic slave trade, but the provision was found to be unenforceable, and it was repealed.

As planters increased their holdings of land and slaves, the price of land rose, and small farmers were driven into less fertile areas. An elite slave-owning class arose that wielded disproportionate political and economic power. By 1860, of the 354,000 whites, only 31,000 owned slaves and two-thirds of these held fewer than 10. Fewer than 5,000 slaveholders had more than 20 slaves; 317 possessed more than 100. These 5,000 planters, especially the elite among them, controlled the state. In addition a middle element of farmers owned land but no slaves. A small number of businessmen and professionals lived in the villages and small towns. The lower class, or "poor whites", occupied marginal farm lands remote from the rich cotton lands and grew food for their families, not cotton. Whether they owned slaves or not, however, most white Mississippians supported the slave society; all whites were considered above blacks in social status. They were both defensive and emotional on the subject of slavery. A slave insurrection scare in 1836 resulted in the hanging of a number of slaves, as was common in the South after such incidents. Several white northerners were suspected of being secret abolitionists.

When cotton was king during the 1850s, Mississippi plantation owners—especially those in the old Natchez District, as well as the newly emerging Delta and Black Belt region of the uplands in the center of the state—became increasingly wealthy due to the great fertility of the soil and the high price of cotton on the international market. The severe wealth imbalances and the necessity of large-scale slave populations to sustain such income played a strong role in state politics and political support for secession. Mississippi was among the six states in the Deep South with the highest proportion of slave population; it was the second state to secede from the union.

Mississippi's population grew rapidly due to migration, both voluntary and forced, reaching 791,305 in 1860. Blacks numbered 437,000, making up 55% of the population; they were overwhelmingly enslaved. Cotton production grew from 43,000 bales in 1820 to more than one million bales in 1860, as Mississippi became the leading cotton-producing state. With international demand high, Mississippi and other Deep South cotton was exported to the textile factories of Britain and France, as well as those in New York and New England. The Deep South was the major supplier and had strong economic ties with the Northeast. By 1820, half of the exports from New York City were related to cotton. Southern businessmen traveled so frequently to the city that they had favorite hotels and restaurants.

In Mississippi some modernizers encouraged crop diversification, and production of vegetables and livestock increased, but King Cotton prevailed. Cotton's ascendancy was seemingly justified in 1859, when Mississippi planters were scarcely touched by the financial panic in the North. They were concerned by inflation of the price of slaves but were in no real distress. Mississippi's per capita wealth was well above the U.S. average. The major planters made very large profits, but they invested it on buying more cotton lands and more slaves, which pushed up prices even higher. They educated their children privately, and the state government made little investment in infrastructure. Railroad construction lagged behind that of other states, even in the South. The threat of abolition troubled planters, but they believed that if needed, the cotton states could secede from the Union, form their own country, and expand to the south in Mexico and Cuba. Until late 1860 they never expected a war.

The relatively low population of the state before the Civil War reflected the fact that much of the state was still frontier and needed many more settlers for development. For instance, except for riverside settlements and plantations, 90% of the Mississippi Delta bottom lands were still undeveloped and covered mostly in mixed forest and swampland. These areas were not cleared and developed until after the war. During and after Reconstruction, most of the new owners in the Delta were freedmen, who bought the land by clearing it and selling off timber.

=== Slavery ===
At the time of the Civil War, the great majority of blacks were slaves living on plantations with 20 or more fellow slaves, many in much larger concentrations. While some had been born in Mississippi, many had been transported to the Deep South in a forcible migration through the domestic slave trade from the Upper South. Some were shipped from the Upper South in the coastwise slave trade, while others were taken overland or forced to make the entire journey on foot.

The typical division of labor on a large plantation included an elite of house slaves, a middle group of overseers, drivers (gang leaders) and skilled craftsmen, and a "lower class" of unskilled field workers whose main job was hoeing and picking cotton. The owners hired white overseers to direct the work. Some slaves resisted by work slowdowns and by breaking tools and equipment. Others left for a while, hiding out for a couple of weeks in woods or nearby plantations. There were no slave revolts of any size, although whites often circulated fearful rumors that one was about to happen. Most slaves who tried to escape were captured and returned, though a handful made it to northern states and eventual freedom.

Most slaves endured the harsh routine of plantation life. Because of their concentration on large plantations, within these constraints they built their own culture, often developing leaders through religion, and others who acquired particular skills. They created their own religious practices and worshipped sometimes in private, developing their own style of Christianity and deciding which stories, such as the Exodus, spoke most to them. While slave marriages were not legally recognized, many families formed unions that lasted, and they struggled to maintain their stability. Some slaves with special skills attained a quasi-free status, being leased out to work on riverboats or in the port cities. Those on the riverboats got to travel to other cities; they were part of a wide information network among slaves.

By 1820, 458 former slaves had been freed in the state. The legislature restricted their lives, requiring free blacks to carry identification and forbidding them from carrying weapons or voting. In 1822 planters decided it was too awkward to have free blacks living near slaves and passed a state law forbidding emancipation except by special act of the legislature for each manumission. In 1860 only 1,000 of the 437,000 blacks in the state were recorded as free. Most of these free people lived in wretched conditions near Natchez.

=== Politics ===
Mississippi was a stronghold of Jacksonian democracy, which glorified the independent farmer; the legislature named the state capital in Andrew Jackson's honor. Corruption and land speculation caused a severe blow to state credit in the years preceding the Civil War. Federally allocated funds were misused, tax collections embezzled, and finally, in 1853, two state-supported banks collapsed when their debts were repudiated. In the Second Party System (1820s to 1850s), Mississippi moved politically from a divided Whig and Democratic state to a one-party Democratic state bent on secession.

Criticism from Northern abolitionists escalated after the Mexican-American War ended in 1848. Mississippi and other southern planters expected the war to gain new territory where slavery could flourish. The South resisted attacks by abolitionists, and white Mississippians were among those who became outspoken defenders of the slave system. An abortive secession attempt in 1850 was followed by a decade of political agitation during which the protection and expansion of slavery became their major goal. When Republican Abraham Lincoln was elected president in 1860 with the goal seeking an eventual end of slavery, Mississippi followed South Carolina and seceded from the Union on January 9, 1861. Mississippi's U.S. senator Jefferson Davis was chosen as president of the Confederate States.

== Civil War ==
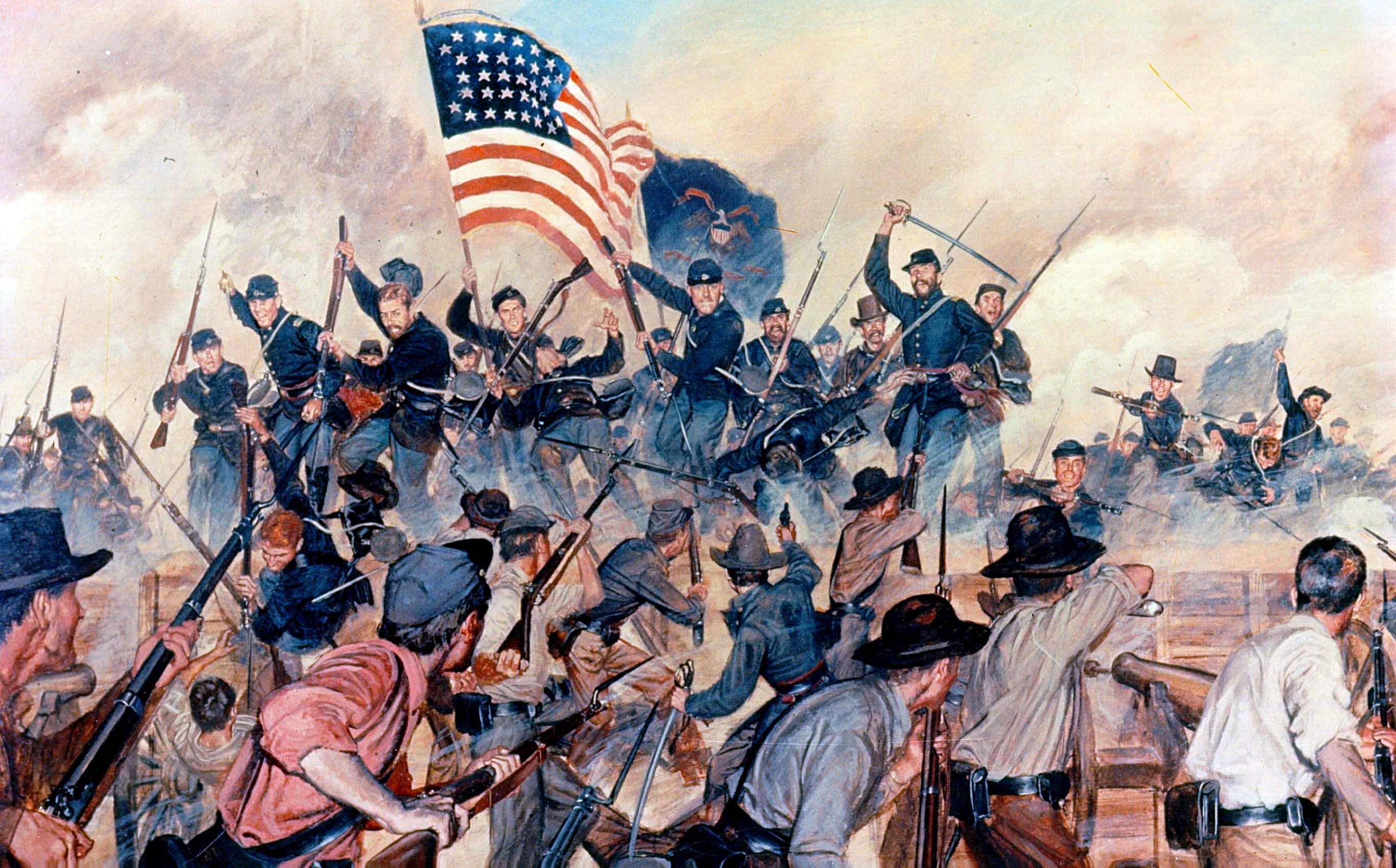
Confederate lines, Vicksburg, May 19, 1863. Shows assault by US 1st Battalion, 13th Infantry

More than 80,000 Mississippians fought in the American Civil War. Fear that white supremacy might be lost were among the reasons that men joined the Confederate Army. Men who owned more property, including slaves, were more likely to volunteer. Men in Mississippi's river counties, regardless of their wealth or other characteristics, joined at lower rates than those living in the state's interior. River-county residents were especially vulnerable and apparently left their communities for safer areas (and sometimes moved out of the Confederacy) rather than face invasion.

Both the Union and Confederacy knew control of the Mississippi River was critical to the war. Union forces mounted major military operations to take over Vicksburg, with General Ulysses S. Grant launching the Shiloh and Corinth campaigns and the siege of Vicksburg, from the spring of 1862 to the summer of 1863. The most important was the Vicksburg Campaign, fought for control of the last Confederate stronghold on the Mississippi River. The fall of the city to General Grant on July 4, 1863, gave the Union control of the Mississippi River, cut off the western states, and made the Confederate cause in the west hopeless.

As Union troops advanced, many slaves escaped and joined their lines to gain freedom. After the Emancipation Proclamation of January 1863, more slaves left the plantations. Thousands of former slaves in Mississippi enlisted in the Union Army in 1863 and the following years.

At the Battle of Grand Gulf, Admiral Porter led seven Union ironclads in an attack on the fortifications and batteries at Grand Gulf, Mississippi. His goal was to take over the Confederate guns and secure the area with troops of McClernand's XIII Corps, who were on the accompanying transports and barges. The Confederates won but it was a hollow victory; the Union defeat at Grand Gulf caused only a slight change in Grant's offensive.

Grant won the Battle of Port Gibson. Advancing toward Port Gibson, Grant's army ran into Confederate outposts after midnight. Union forces advanced on the Rodney Road and a plantation road at dawn, and were met by Confederates. Grant forced the Confederates to fall back to new defensive positions several times during the day; they could not stop the Union onslaught and left the field in the early evening. This defeat demonstrated that the Confederates were unable to defend the Mississippi River line; the Federals secured their needed beachhead.

Battle of Brice's Crossroads

General William Tecumseh Sherman's march from Vicksburg to Meridian, Mississippi, was designed to destroy the strategic railroad center of Meridian, which had been supplying Confederate needs. The campaign was Sherman's first application of total war tactics, prefiguring his March to the Sea through Georgia in 1864.

The Confederates did not have better luck at the Battle of Raymond. On May 10, 1863, Pemberton sent troops from Jackson to Raymond, 20 miles (32 km) to the southwest. Brig. Gen. Gregg had an over-strength brigade, but they had endured a grueling march from Port Hudson, Louisiana, arriving in Raymond late on May 11. The next day he tried to ambush a small Union raiding party. The party was Maj. Gen. John A. Logan's Division of the XVII Corps. Gregg tried to hold Fourteen Mile Creek, and a sharp battle ensued for six hours, but the overwhelming Union force prevailed and the Confederates retreated. This left the Southern Railroad of Mississippi vulnerable to Union forces, severing the lifeline of Vicksburg.

In April–May 1863 Union colonel Benjamin H. Grierson led a major cavalry raid that raced through Mississippi and Louisiana, destroying railroads, telegraph lines, and Confederate weapons and supplies. The raid also served as a diversion to take away Confederate attention from Grant's moves toward Vicksburg.

A Union expedition in June 1864, commanded by General Samuel D. Sturgis, was opposed by Confederate general Nathan Bedford Forrest. They clashed at the Battle of Brice's Crossroads on June 10, 1864, and Forrest routed the Yankees in his greatest battlefield victory.

=== Anti-Confederate Unionism ===
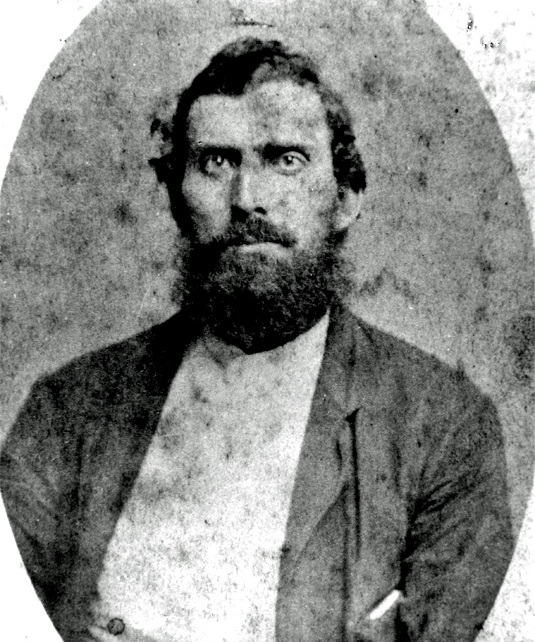
Newton Knight, Unionist leader of "The Free State of Jones" in Jones County, Mississippi

The great majority of whites supported the Confederacy; The main anti-Confederate areas were Jones County in the southeastern corner of the state, and Itawamba County and Tishomingo County in the northeastern corner. Leaders of these Unionists included Newton Knight, who helped form the "Free State of Jones", and Presbyterian minister John Aughey, whose sermons were circulated. The Unionists furnished around 545 white troops who served in the Union Army.

=== Homefront ===
After each battle, there was increased economic chaos and local societal breakdown. State government during the course of the war transferred around the state. It moved from Jackson to Enterprise, to Meridian and back to Jackson, to Meridian and then to Columbus and Macon, Georgia, and finally back to what was left of Jackson. The first of the two wartime governors was the Fire-Eater John J. Pettus, who carried the state into secession, whipped up the war spirit, began military and domestic mobilization, and prepared to finance the war. His successor, General Charles Clark, elected in 1863, remained committed to continuing the fight regardless of the cost, but he faced a deteriorating military and economic situation. The war presented both men with enormous challenges in providing an orderly, stable government for Mississippi.

There were no slave insurrections, but many slaves escaped to Union lines. Numerous plantations turned to food production. The federal government wanted to keep up cotton production to fulfill the North's needs, and some planters sold their cotton to Union Treasury agents for high prices. The Confederates considered this a sort of treason but were unable to stop the lucrative trading on the black market.

The war shattered the lives of all classes, high and low. Upper-class ladies replaced balls and parties with bandage-rolling sessions and fund-raising efforts. But soon enough they were losing brothers, sons and husbands to battlefield deaths and disease, lost their incomes and luxuries, and had to deal with chronic shortages and poor ersatz substitutes for common items. They took on unexpected responsibilities, including the chores previously left to slaves when the latter struck out for freedom. The women coped by focusing on survival. They maintained their family honor by upholding Confederate patriotism to the bitter end. Less privileged white women struggled even more to hold their families together in their men's absence; many became refugees in camps or fled to Union lines. After the war, Southern women organized to create Confederate cemeteries and memorials, becoming champions of the "Lost Cause" and shapers of social memory.

Black women and children had an especially hard time as the plantation regime collapsed; many took refuge in camps operated by the Union Army. They were freed after the Emancipation Proclamation but suffered from widespread diseases that flourished in the crowded camps. Disease was also common in the troop camps; during the war, more men on both sides died of disease than of wounds or direct warfare.

== Reconstruction ==
After the defeat of the Confederacy, President Andrew Johnson appointed a temporary state government under provisional governor Judge William Lewis Sharkey (1798–1873). It repealed the 1861 Ordinance of Secession and wrote new "Black Codes", defining and limiting the civil rights of freedmen, the former slaves. The whites tried to restrict the African Americans to a second-class status without citizenship or voting rights. Johnson was following the previously expressed policies of his predecessor, 16th President Abraham Lincoln. He had planned a generous and tolerating Reconstruction policy towards the former Confederates and southerners. He intended to grant citizenship and voting rights first to Black veterans, while slowly integrating the remainder of the freedmen into the political and economic life in the nation and the "new South".

The Black Codes were never implemented. Radical Republicans in the Congress, with the early support of President Lincoln, objected strongly to the intent to impose new restrictions on the movement and rights of freedmen. The federal government established the Freedmen's Bureau as an agency to help educate and assist the former slaves, in the U.S. War Department. It attempted to help the freedmen negotiate contracts and other relations in the new free labor market. Most officials in the Freedmen's Bureau were former Union Army officers from the North. Many settled permanently in the state, with some becoming political leaders in the Republican Party and in business (they were scornfully known as "carpetbaggers" by white Democrats in the South). The Black Codes outraged northern opinion, as they represented an attempt to reassert conditions of slavery and white supremacy. They were not fully implemented in any state. White Mississippians and other Southerners were committed to restoring white supremacy and circumscribing the legal, civil, political, and social rights of the freedmen.

In September 1865 Congress was under the control of more Radical Republicans from the North, and refused to seat the newly elected Mississippi delegation. Responding to tumultuous conditions and violence, in 1867, Congress passed Reconstruction legislation. It used U.S. Army forces to occupy and manage various areas of the South in an effort to create a new order, and Mississippi was one of the areas designated to be under military control.

The military Governor-General, and Union Army Gen. Edward O.C. Ord, (1818–1883), commander of the Mississippi/Arkansas District, was assigned to register the state's electorate so that voters could elect representatives to write a new state constitution reflecting the granting of citizenship and the franchise to freedmen through amendments to the United States Constitution. In a contested election, the state's white voters rejected the proposal of a new state constitution. Mississippi continued to be governed by federal martial law. Union Gen. Adelbert Ames (1835–1933) of Maine, under direction from the Republican majority in the U.S. Congress, deposed the provisional civil government appointed by President Johnson. He enabled all black men of age to enroll as voters (not just veterans), and temporarily prohibited about a thousand or so former Confederate leaders to vote or hold state offices.

In 1868 a biracial coalition (dominated by whites) drafted a new constitution for the state; it was adopted by referendum. The Constitutional Convention was the first political organization in the state's history to include African American (then referred to as "Negro" or "Colored") representatives, but they did not dominate the convention, nor the later state legislature. Freedmen numbered 17 among the 100 members, although blacks comprised more than half of the state population of the time. Thirty-two Mississippi counties had black majorities, but freedmen elected whites as well as blacks to represent them.

The 1868 constitution had major elements that lasted for 22 years. The convention adopted universal male suffrage (unrestricted by property qualifications, educational requirements or poll taxes); created the framework for the state's first public school system (which Northern and border states had begun 40 years earlier); forbade race distinctions in the possession and inheritance of property; and prohibited limiting civil rights in travel. It provided for a four-year term for the governor rather than two years (the previous legislatures had severely limited executive power); provided the governor with the power to appoint judges (taking judicial elections out of what had been corrupt elections before the war); required legislative reapportionment of seats to recognize the new voting freedmen in many jurisdictions; and repudiated the ordinances and powers of secession. Opponents of black franchise referred to this as the "Black and Tan Convention", although whites composed the overwhelming majority of delegates. Mississippi was readmitted to the Union on January 11, 1870, and its representatives and senators were seated in Congress on February 23, 1870.

Black Mississippians, participating in the political process for the first time, formed a coalition with white Republicans made up of locals and Northerners in a Republican party that controlled the state legislature for a time. Most of the Republican voters were freedmen, several of whom held important state offices. Some black leaders emerged who had gained education in the North and were returning to the South. A. K. Davis served as lieutenant governor, and Hiram Revels (1827–1901) and Blanche K. Bruce (1841–1898) were elected by the Legislature to the U.S. Senate. John R. Lynch (1847–1939) was elected as a representative to Congress. The Republican regime faced the determined opposition of the "unreconstructed" white Democrats in the population. Soon after the end of the war, chapters of the Ku Klux Klan were organized in Mississippi, working to intimidate blacks and their allies, such as schoolteachers, and suppress voting.

The planter James Lusk Alcorn (1816–1894), a Confederate general, was elected to the U.S. Senate in 1865 but, like other Southerners who had been loyal to the Confederacy, was not allowed to take a seat at that time. He supported suffrage for freedmen and endorsed the Fourteenth Amendment, as required by the Republicans in Congress. Alcorn became the leader of the "scalawags", local residents who comprised about a third of the Republican Party in the state, in coalition with "carpetbaggers" (migrants from the North) and freedmen.

Alcorn was elected as governor in 1869 and served from 1870 to 1871. As a modernizer, he appointed many like-minded former Whigs, even if they had become Democrats. He strongly supported education, conceding segregation of public schools to get them started. He supported founding a new college for freedmen, now known as Alcorn State University (established 1871 in Lorman). He maneuvered to make his ally Hiram Revels its president. Radical Republicans opposed Alcorn as they were angry about his patronage policy. One complained that Alcorn's policy was to see "the old civilization of the South 'modernized'" rather than lead a total political, social and economic revolution.

Alcorn resigned the governorship to become a U.S. senator (1871 to 1877), replacing his ally Hiram Revels, the first African-American U.S. senator from the state. In speeches to the Senate, Alcorn urged the removal of the political disabilities of white southerners and rejected Radical Republican proposals to enforce social equality by federal legislation. He denounced the federal cotton tax as robbery, and defended separate schools for both races in Mississippi. Although a former slaveholder, he characterized slavery as "a cancer upon the body of the Nation" and expressed his gratitude for its end.

Although President Grant achieved suppression of the KKK in much of the South through the Enforcement Acts, new groups of Democratic insurgents arose through the 1870s. Such paramilitary terrorist organizations as the White League, the Red Shirts in Mississippi and the Carolinas, and associated rifle clubs raised the level of violence at every election, attacking blacks to suppress the freedmen's vote.

In 1870, former military governor Adelbert Ames (1835–1933) was elected by the Legislature (as was the process at the time) to the U.S. Senate. Ames and Alcorn battled for control of the Republican Party in Mississippi; their struggle caused the party to lose its precarious unity. In 1873 they both ran for governor. Ames was supported by the Radicals and most African Americans, while Alcorn won the votes of conservative whites and most of the scalawags. Ames won by a vote of 69,870 to 50,490.

In 1874 Republican voters elected a black sheriff in the city of Vicksburg and dominated other elections. White had been organizing to throw out Republicans and, on December 6, 1874, forced the newly elected sheriff Peter Crosby to leave his office. Freedmen tried to support him, coming in from the rural areas on December 7, but he advised them to return home peacefully. Armed white militia attacked the freedmen that day and in the following days, in what became known as the Vicksburg massacre. White Democrats are estimated to have killed 300 blacks in the area. The massacre was carried by newspapers from New York to California. The New York Times also carried reporting on the congressional investigation into these events, beginning in January 1875.

The Democratic Party had factions of the Regulars and New Departures, but as the state election of 1875 approached, they united and worked on the "Mississippi Plan", to organize whites to defeat both white and black Republicans. They used economic and political pressure against scalawags and carpetbaggers, persuading them to change parties or leave the state. Armed attacks by the Red Shirts, White League and rifle clubs on Republicans proliferated, as in the September 1875 "Clinton Riot". Governor Ames appealed to the federal government for armed assistance, which was refused. That November, Democrats gained firm control of both houses of the legislature by such violence and election fraud. Ames requested the intervention of the U.S. Congress since the election had been subject to voter intimidation and fraud. The state legislature, convening in 1876, drew up articles of impeachment against him and all statewide officials. He resigned and fled the state, "marking the end of Republican Reconstruction in Mississippi."

== Gilded Age (1877–1900) ==
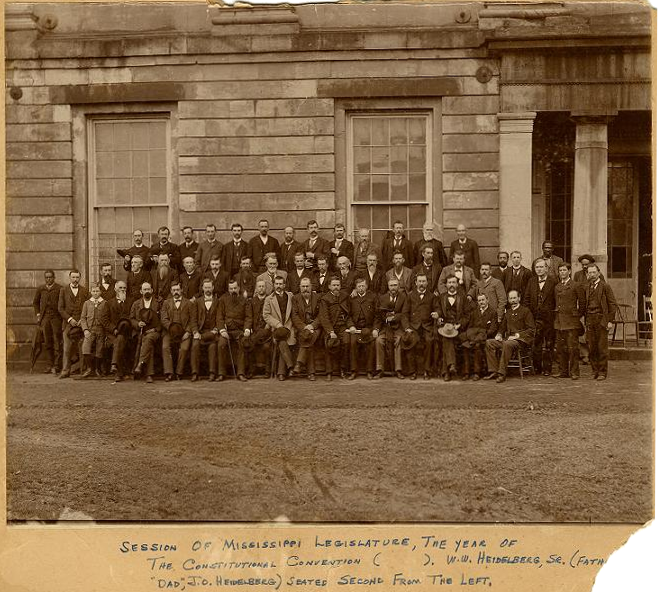
The legislature of the State of Mississippi in 1890

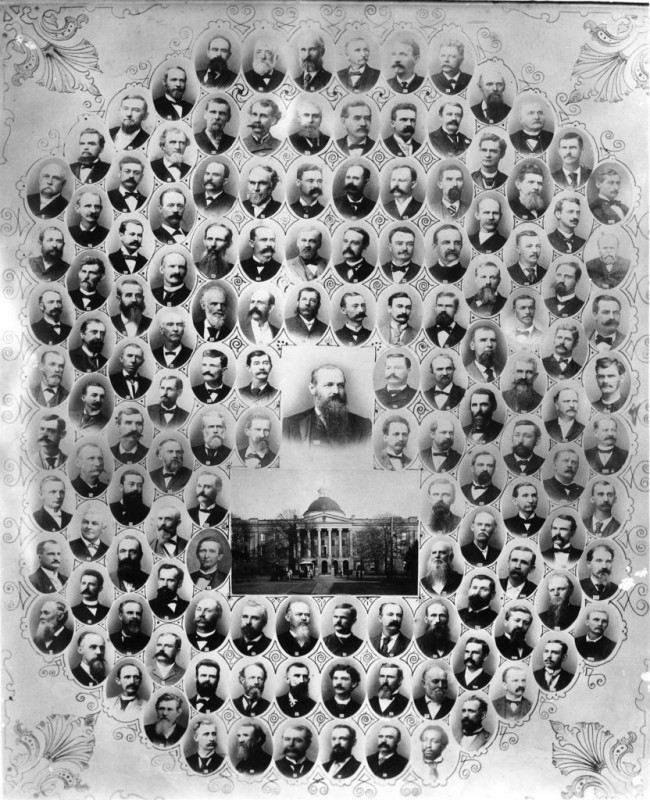
A poster showing the members of the 1890 Mississippian state constitutional convention. The members were overwhelmingly white Democrats; the only black member was a man who was allowed into the convention for his willingness to support black disenfranchisement.

There was steady economic and social progress among some classes in Mississippi after the Reconstruction era, despite the low prices for cotton and reliance on agriculture. Politically the state was controlled by the conservative elite whites, known as "Bourbon Democrats" by their critics. The Bourbons represented the planters, landowners and merchants. They used violence, intimidation, and coercion to suppress black voting at the polls, but freedmen elected many representatives to local offices, such as sheriff and justice of the peace. The Bourbons controlled the Democratic Party conventions and state government.

The state remained largely rural, but the nascent railroad system, which had been destroyed in the war, was rebuilt and more investments were made in infrastructure. A few more towns developed, as well as small-scale industry, notably the lumber industry in the Piney Woods region of the state. Most farmers continued to grow cotton. The "crop-lien system involved local merchants who lent money for food and supplies all year, and then split the cotton crop to pay the debts and perhaps leave a little cash left over for the farmer—or often leave him further in debt to the merchants."

In 1878 the worst yellow fever epidemic Mississippi had seen ravaged the state. The disease, sometimes known as "Yellow Jack" or "Bronze John", produced so many fatalities that it devastated the society both socially and economically. Entire families were wiped out, while others fled their homes in panic for the presumed safety of other parts of the state, as people did not understand how the disease was transmitted. Quarantine regulations, passed to prevent the spread of the disease, brought trade to a stop. Some local economies never recovered. Beechland, near Vicksburg, became a ghost town. By the end of the year, 3,227 people in the state had died from the disease, particularly along the coast.

The small farmers struggled against the Bourbon control of politics and the credit lien system, which seemed to keep them forever in debts. The Populist movement failed to attract the large following in Mississippi that it did in Alabama, Georgia and other Southern states. Mississippi did produce some Populist spokesmen, such as newspaper editor Frank Burkitt, but poor farmers, white and black, refused to follow the leadership of the Farmers' Alliance. Few farmers were willing to support the sub-treasury plan, the Alliance's plan to aid farmers by providing low-cost federal loans secured by crops. The Democratic Party machine, the increasing activism of the National Grange, and effective disenfranchisement of most black voters and many poor whites after 1890 under provisions of the new constitution, designed to "exclude the Negro" and help the Democrats in "keeping the Negro down", according to its drafters, meant the failure of Mississippi populism. The constitution required payment of a poll tax for voter registration, which many poor people could not afford. The voter rolls dropped dramatically, and white Democrats secured a hold on power in the state. By the birth of the People's Party in 1892, Mississippi populism was too weak to play a major role. According to Democrat James K. Vardaman, Mississippi's governor, the purpose of the 1890 constitution was "to eliminate the nigger from politics."

Whitecapping was the name associated with activities by a dirt farmer movement that arose in the Piney Woods region of southern Mississippi. Poor whites organized against low prices, rising costs, and increasing tenancy brought about by the crop lien system. Whitecaps resented black tenant farmers on lands acquired by foreclosure by merchants—some of them Jewish. Whitecap Clubs, resembling fraternal and military organizations, tried to intimidate black laborers and landowners, and to prevent mercantile land acquisition. They were anti-black and anti-Jewish. Whitecaps came from the rural poor; their leaders from a higher social stratum.

=== African Americans and Disfranchisement ===
Mississippi has been thought to typify the Deep South during the era of Jim Crow that began in the late 19th century. But it had an enormous frontier of undeveloped land in the backcountry and bottomlands of the Mississippi Delta. Tens of thousands of black and white migrants came to the Delta seeking the chance to buy and work land, cut timber, and make lives for themselves and their families. Because the Mississippi Delta contained so much fertile bottomland away from the river settlements, African Americans achieved unusually high rates of land ownership from 1870 to 1900. Two-thirds of the independent farmers in the Delta were black.

As the Panic of 1893 brought another depression and very low cotton prices, many farmers had to sell their land to pay off debts and become sharecroppers. The sharecropping system, as Cresswell (2006) shows, functioned as a compromise between white landowners' desire for a reliable supply of labor, and black workers' refusal to work in gangs. By the turn of the century, much of the second-generation of black owner-farmers had lost their land.

In 1890 the state adopted a new constitution that imposed a poll tax of $2 a year, which the great majority of blacks and poor whites could not pay to register to vote; they were effectively excluded from the political process. These requirements, with additions in legislation of 1892, resulted in a 90% reduction in the number of blacks who voted. In every county whites allowed a handful of prominent black ministers and local leaders to vote.

As only voters could serve on juries, disenfranchisement meant blacks could not serve on juries, and they lost all chance at local and state offices, as well as representation in Congress. When these provisions survived a Supreme Court challenge in 1898 in Williams v. Mississippi, other southern state legislatures rapidly incorporated them into new constitutions or amendments, effectively extending disfranchisement to every southern state. In 1900 the population of Mississippi was nearly 59% African American, but they were virtually excluded from political life.

The Jim Crow system became total after 1900, with disenfranchisement, coupled with increasingly restrictive racial segregation laws, and increased lynchings. Economic disasters always lurked, such as failure of the cotton crop due to boll weevil infestation, and successive severe flooding in 1912 and 1913. By 1920, the third generation after freedom, most African Americans in the state were landless sharecroppers or laborers facing inescapable poverty.

Legal racial segregation was imposed in Mississippi primarily following the Reconstruction era. A handful of state laws earlier required separate facilities for black and white school children. The legislature passed statutes requiring three restroom facilities in public buildings: one for white males, one for white females, and one for black males and females. Otherwise, segregation arose by local custom more than it did by state or municipal law. Since segregation was a customary practice, historians consider it to be one that mandated social distance between whites and blacks rather than physical distance. In most Mississippi communities from the late 1800s until the 1970s, blacks and whites lived in relative proximity to one another. Whites depended on the labor of blacks either as agricultural or domestic workers. White and black children often played together until they reached puberty, at which time parents began instructing their children about the racial status quo.

White children were taught they were superior to blacks, while black children were forced to learn the vacillating and arbitrary customs of Jim Crow, which often differed from community to community. By 1900, racial segregation had become more rigid. Jim Crow became the mainstay of the Mississippi social order.

Tens of thousands of African Americans left Mississippi by train, foot, or boat to migrate north starting in the 1880s; migration reached its pinnacle during and after World War I. In the Great Migration, they went North to leave the violence and a society that had closed off opportunity. Another wave of migration arose in the 1940s and 1950s. Almost half a million people, three-quarters of them black, left Mississippi in the second migration, many seeking jobs in the burgeoning wartime defense industry on the West Coast, particularly in California.

Jim Crow and disenfranchisement persisted in Mississippi for decades, sometimes enforced by violence and economic blackmail, particularly as African Americans organized to achieve civil rights. It did not legally end until after passage of the Civil Rights Act of 1964 and the Voting Rights Act of 1965, as well as concerted federal enforcement, and court challenges by black groups and national advocates, and local customs began to break down by 1970.

==== Schools ====
Following Reconstruction, the Democrat-dominated state legislature cut back on already limited funding for public schools. For decades public school funding was poor for whites and very poor for blacks. Northern philanthropy helped support the schools. The Anna T. Jeanes Foundation, begun in 1907 and also known as the Negro Rural School Fund, aimed to provide rudimentary education for rural Southern blacks. Jeanes supervisors, all experienced teachers, personally made physical and academic improvements in rural schools. Early Jeanes supervisors brought vocational education into their classrooms, based on the Hampton and Tuskegee Institute models promoted by Booker T. Washington. By the 1940s, the Jeanes program changed its emphasis from industrial education to academic subjects.

Other major northern foundations also helped, especially the General Education Board (funded by the Rockefeller Foundation and the Rosenwald Fund), which supported construction of more than 5,000 schools in southern rural areas. Northern churches supported denominational colleges.

==== Jazz ====
Mississippi became a center of American music traditions: gospel music, jazz, blues, and rock and roll were all invented, promulgated, or developed largely by Mississippi musicians, particularly of the Delta areas. They also carried these traditions upriver to Chicago during the Great Migration, creating new forms of jazz and blues in that city.

In the 1940s, John Lomax and his son Alan recorded some of the Delta's rich musical tradition for the Library of Congress. They sought out blues songs and field chants at Mississippi State Penitentiary at Parchman. In 1941, Alan Lomax recorded Muddy Waters, then 28 years old, at Stovall's Plantation. Among other major artists, Bo Diddley, B.B. King and Muddy Waters were born and raised on Mississippi plantations.

== Progressive Era ==
By 1900, Mississippi lagged behind other Southern states. It had a one-party government dominated by white Democrats who emphasized not raising taxes, resulting in no paved roads; residents suffered widespread illiteracy and regular epidemics of contagious diseases, the latter spread in part because of the lack of sanitation infrastructure, endemic hookworm; this was the nadir of race relations, marked by a high rate of lynchings of blacks, especially when sharecrop accounts were due to be settled and cotton prices were low; local affairs were controlled by courthouse rings; and the state had few natural assets besides prime cotton land and once important cities on the Mississippi River.

Mississippi failed to attract much outside investment or European immigration, although European Jews settled in the larger cities such as Meridian and Jackson. Planters recruited Chinese workers for agriculture from 1900 to 1930, but the newcomers did not stay long in the fields. They became merchants in small towns. Planters also had recruited Italian workers for field labor, and they complained about peonage conditions to their consulate. A State Department investigation ensued in some areas, including an Arkansas plantation owned by prominent US Senator LeRoy Percy of Greenville, Mississippi.

The Progressive Era had some results in Mississippi. Governor Theodore Bilbo (1916 to 1920) had the most successful administration of all the governors who served between 1877 and 1917. According to historian Albert Kirwan:

It was not until the demagogues Vardaman and Bilbo awakened the social consciousness of the people that any constructive social legislation was enacted in Mississippi. . . . Bilbo carried it further with his commission to eliminate adult illiteracy, a law to curb the textbook trust, the furnishing of transportation for children in the rural consolidated schools, and the passage of a compulsory school attendance law. Under his administration, too, laws were passed curbing the activities of corporations and the sale of bogus stocks, regulating public utilities, and breaking the insurance trust. He sponsored the building of hospitals and institutions for the subnormal, game and fish laws, temperance, laws to eradicate ticks and tuberculosis from cattle, estate and inheritance taxes, a tax equalization commission, antilobbying laws, and the elimination of public hangings.

== 1920s and 1930s ==
Mississippians had more prosperity in the 1920s than they had known for two generations, although the state was still poor and rural by national standards. The people gained a slice of the American Dream. Ownby (1999), in his in-depth study of the state, identifies four American dreams that the new 20th-century consumer culture addressed. The first was the "Dream of Abundance", offering a cornucopia of material goods to all Americans, making them proud to be the richest society on earth. The second was the "Dream of a Democracy of Goods", whereby everyone had access to the same products regardless of race, gender, ethnicity, or class, thereby challenging the aristocratic norms of the rest of the world, whereby only the rich or well-connected are granted access to luxury. The "Dream of Freedom of Choice", with its ever-expanding variety of goods, allowed people to fashion their own particular style. Finally was the "Dream of Novelty", in which ever-changing fashions, new models, and unexpected new products broadened the consumer experience and challenged the conservatism of traditional society and culture, and politics. Ownby acknowledges that the dreams of the new consumer culture radiated from the major cities, but notes that they quickly penetrated the most rural and most isolated areas, such as rural Mississippi. With the arrival of the Model T car after 1910, many consumers in rural America were no longer locked into local general stores with their limited merchandise and high prices. They could go to towns and cities to do comparison shopping. Ownby demonstrates that poor black Mississippians shared in the new consumer culture. He attributes some of their desire to move to ambition, and acknowledges that hundreds of thousands of blacks moved to Memphis or Chicago in the Great Migration. Other historians have attributed the migration decisions to the poor schools for blacks, a high rate of violence, social oppression, and political disenfranchisement in Mississippi.

Not all Mississippi was doing well. In the Pearl River country in the south central region, the 1920s was a decade of persistent poverty. Locals had new interest in anti-modernist politics and culture. The timber companies that had employed up to half of all workers were running short of timber, so payrolls dwindled. Farming was hard-scrabble. Governor Theodore G. Bilbo, a native of the region, won widespread support among the poor white farmers and loggers with his attacks on the elites, the big cities, and the blacks. Dry laws were but one aspect of a pervasive prohibitionism that included laws against business or recreation on Sunday, as well as attacks on Catholics and immigrants (often the same, as new immigrants came from Catholic countries). Baptist and some other denominations embraced fundamentalism and rejected liberal ideas such as evolution and the Social Gospel.

=== Transportation ===
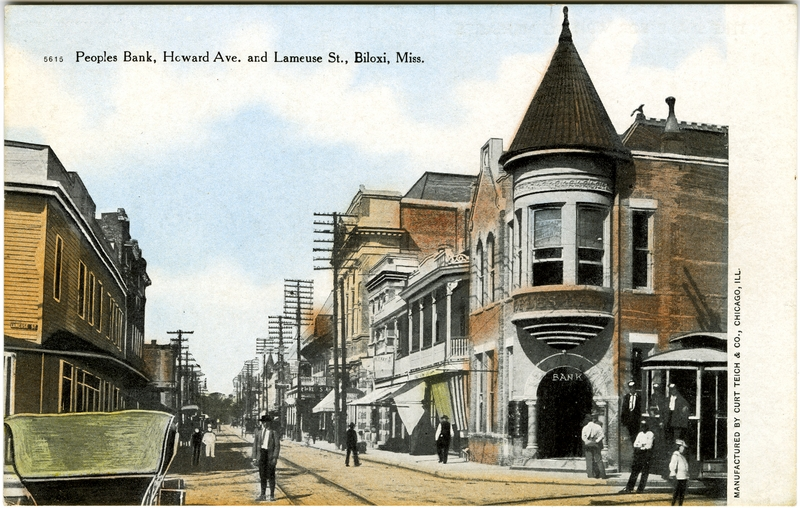
Biloxi streetcar, early 20th century

When the automobile arrived about 1910, the state had poorly constructed dirt roads used for wagon traffic, and an outdated system of taxation. Road improvement continued to be a local affair controlled by individual county supervisors for each beat in the counties; they achieved few positive results. The Lindsey Wagon Company of Laurel built the famous Lindsey wagon after 1899. It was a heavy-duty eight-wheel wagon used to haul logs, timber, and other bulky and heavy material. Wagon production reached a peak in the 1920s, then declined. Improved roads finally made it possible for residents to use trucks built in Detroit. The Great Depression after 1929 reduced the need for new wagons.

After 1928, the need to build roads motivated politicians to talk up the cause. They enacted massive bond issues, created excise taxes, and centralized control to create a genuine state highway system, with a system of main highways designed by engineers, using a common system of signage and nomenclature.

== World War II ==
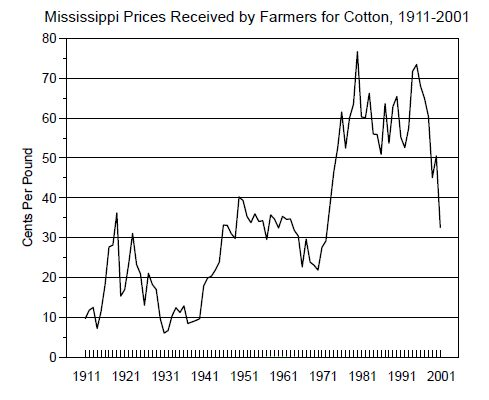
Before 1945, times were good when the price of cotton was above 20 cents.

The war years brought prosperity as cotton prices soared and new war installations paid high wages. Many blacks headed to northern and western cities, particularly in California, as part of the second and larger wave of the Great Migration. White farmers often headed to southern factory towns. Young men, white and black, were equally subject to the draft, but farmers were often exempt on occupational grounds. The World War II era marked a transition from labor-intensive agriculture to mechanized farming in the Delta region of Mississippi. Federal farm payments and improvements in mechanical cotton pickers made modernization economically possible by 1940, but most planters feared loss of racial and social control and simply shifted their workers from sharecropping to wage labor. As workers left the farm for military service or defense jobs, farm wages rose. By 1944, wages had tripled. In 1945 the newly established Delta War Wage Board provided planters temporary relief by setting a maximum wage for farm workers, but President Harry S. Truman lifted wartime economic controls in 1946.

Beginning in the 1930s, the ravages of the boll weevil and federal crop restrictions and conservation programs encouraged many farmers to turn from cotton farming to growing other crops, such as soybeans; to sowing grasses for livestock; and to planting trees for timber. Agricultural productivity increased, and the soils were improved by crop rotation, strip planting, terracing, contour plowing, and the use of improved fertilizers, insecticides, and seeds. After 1945, farm mechanization advanced rapidly, especially in the Cotton Belt, and small farms were consolidated, as small farmers who could not afford the new machinery and sharecroppers left the land. Planters rapidly mechanized. It took only a few operators of cotton-picking machines to do the work of hundreds of laborers. The sharecroppers could find no other work, and this system collapsed after they moved to the cities in the North and West. By 1950 whites were a majority of the population statewide and in every region outside the Delta.

== 1945–2000 ==
In the postwar period, African-American veterans and others began to press for improved civil rights. There was high resistance from many whites, leading to outbreaks of violence and other forms of intimidation. Despite this, mature men with families were among those who joined the NAACP and later such groups as CORE and SNCC. Given the repressed state of its black population, Mississippi was a center of the Civil Rights Movement. In 1954 the US Supreme Court ruled in Brown v. Board of Education that segregated public education was unconstitutional. In reaction the state set up the Mississippi State Sovereignty Commission, ostensibly to market its advantages. This tax-supported group began to spy on state citizens, identifying professionals such as teachers as activists, and sharing data on persons' activities with the White Citizens Councils formed in many cities and towns in this period. Whites used economic intimidation to suppress activism, firing people from jobs, evicting them from rental properties, refusing loans, etc. The state's activities captured the national stage in 1963 and 1964. Few white leaders in the state supported the effort to secure voting and exercise of other civil rights for African Americans.

According to the 1960 census, the state had a population of 2,178,141, of which 915,743, or 42% of the residents, were black. During their long disenfranchisement, white state legislators had consistently underfunded segregated schools and services for African Americans, created programs that did not represent their interests, and passed laws that discriminated against them systematically. African Americans had no representation in local governments, juries or law enforcement.

Based on complaints and research by the Department of Justice,

In 1962 the United States government brought an action against the State of Mississippi, state election commissioners, and six county registrars, alleging that the defendants had violated the voting rights of African-American citizens. The U.S. District Court for the Southern District of Mississippi dismissed the complaint, but the Supreme Court reversed the suit on appeal in March 1965. However, Congress passed the Voting Rights Act of 1965 before the District Court reconsidered the case ... making significant portions moot.

On another front, young people attempted to integrate the state's institutions of higher education. James Meredith, the first black student to enroll at the University of Mississippi, was greeted with the Ole Miss riot of 1962 as opponents rushed to the campus from the region. A white mob attacked 500 Federal law enforcement officers and 3,000 United States Army troops and federalized Mississippi National Guardsmen deployed by President John F. Kennedy to ensure Meredith's safety. Rioters assaulted the federal and state forces with bricks, bottles, and gunfire before the federal and state forces responded with rifle fire and tear gas. The fighting which ensued claimed the lives of two civilians and seriously injured dozens of more people, and polarized race relations and politics. Whites believed they were under attack from the federal government.

Following the murder of three civil rights workers in the early summer, in September 1964 the Federal Bureau of Investigation launched a secretive and extralegal counterintelligence program known as COINTELPRO-WHITE HATE. This covert action program sought to expose, disrupt, and otherwise neutralize Ku Klux Klan groups in Mississippi whose violent vigilante activities alarmed the national government. The program succeeded in creating an atmosphere of paranoia that turned many Klan members against each other. It helped destroy many Klan groups between 1964 and 1971. Some members of the Klan groups subsequently joined other white supremacist organizations, including Christian Identity.

=== Freedom Summer, 1964 ===
Meanwhile, black activists had been increasing their local work throughout the South. In Mississippi in 1962, several activists formed the Council of Federated Organizations (COFO), to coordinate activities in voter registration and education of civil rights groups in Mississippi: the Congress of Racial Equality (CORE), the National Association for the Advancement of Colored People (NAACP), the Southern Christian Leadership Conference (SCLC), and the Student Nonviolent Coordinating Committee (SNCC).

In 1963 COFO organized the Freedom Vote in Mississippi to demonstrate the desire of black Mississippians to vote. They had been disfranchised since statutory and constitutional changes in 1890 and 1892. More than 80,000 people quickly registered and voted in mock elections which pitted candidates from the "Freedom Party" against the official state Democratic Party candidates.

In the summer of 1964, the COFO brought more than one hundred college students, many from the Northern and Western United States, to Mississippi to join with local activists to register voters, teach in "Freedom Schools" and organize the Mississippi Freedom Democratic Party. Many white residents deeply resented the outsiders and attempts to change their society. The work was dangerous. Activists were threatened.

On June 21, 1964, three civil rights workers, James Chaney, a young black Mississippian and plasterer's apprentice; and two Jewish volunteers from New York, Andrew Goodman, a Queens College student; and Michael Schwerner, a social worker, disappeared. With the national uproar caused by their disappearance, President Johnson forced J. Edgar Hoover to have the FBI investigate.

The FBI found the bodies of the civil rights workers on August 4 in an earthen dam outside Philadelphia, Mississippi. During its investigation, the FBI also discovered the bodies of several other Mississippi blacks whose murders and disappearances over the past several years had not gained attention outside their local communities.

The case of the young murdered activists captured national attention. They were found to have been murdered by members of the Klan, some of them members of the Neshoba County sheriff's department. President Johnson used the outrage over their deaths and his formidable political skills to bring about passage of the Civil Rights Act of 1964, signed July 2. It banned discrimination in public accommodations, employment and education. It also had a section about voting, but voting protection was addressed more substantially by passage of the Voting Rights Act of 1965.

=== Mississippi Freedom Democratic Party, 1964 ===
In 1964, civil rights organizers launched the Mississippi Freedom Democratic Party (MFDP) to challenge the all-white slate from the state party, based as it was on disfranchisement of blacks. When Mississippi voting registrars refused to recognize their candidates, the MFDP held its own primary. They selected Fannie Lou Hamer, Annie Devine, and Victoria Gray to run for Congress, and a slate of delegates to represent Mississippi at the 1964 Democratic National Convention.

The presence of the Mississippi Freedom Democratic Party at the convention in Atlantic City, New Jersey, was inconvenient for national leaders. Democratic Party organizers had planned a triumphant celebration of the Johnson Administration's achievements in civil rights, rather than a fight over racism within the party. Johnson was also worried about inroads that Republican candidate Barry Goldwater was making in what had been the Democratic stronghold of the "Solid South", as well as the support which Independent candidate George Wallace had gained in the North during the Democratic primaries. The all-white delegations from other Southern states threatened to walk out if the official slate from Mississippi was not seated.

Johnson could not prevent the MFDP from taking its case to the Credentials Committee. There Fannie Lou Hamer testified eloquently about the beatings which she and others endured, and the threats they faced, all for trying to register to vote and exercise their constitutional rights. Turning to the television cameras, Hamer asked, "Is this America?"

Johnson offered the MFDP a "compromise" under which it would receive two non-voting, at-large seats, while the white delegation sent by the official Democratic Party would retain its seats. The MFDP angrily rejected the compromise. The MFDP kept up its agitation within the convention, even after it was denied official recognition. The 1964 convention disillusioned many within the MFDP and the Civil Rights Movement, but it did not destroy the MFDP. The new party invited Malcolm X, head of the Black Muslims, to speak at its founding convention and issued a statement opposing the war in Vietnam.

Armed self-defense became an integral part of the Southern planning strategy of the Student Nonviolent Coordinating Committee (SNCC) and the Congress of Racial Equality (CORE) after 1964. The ideological shift on the question of nonviolence within CORE and SNCC occurred primarily because of the effect of white violence in Mississippi, such as the murders of Chaney, Schwerner and Goodman in Neshoba County. The shift marked the beginning of the end of nonviolence as the philosophy and method of the Southern freedom movement.

Southern blacks had a tradition of armed resistance to white violence that had become more organized and intense as the struggle accelerated and federal protection failed to appear. Moreover, it was the armed protection by local blacks and the haven provided by Mississippi's black farming communities that allowed SNCC and CORE to operate effectively in the state.

After 1966 the blacks moved into the Democratic party, where they organized politically to vote, to nominate candidates for office, and win their elections. They struggled to get candidates elected to office, particularly in the Delta, where they were a majority of the population and had long been oppressed by white officials.

=== Conservative movement to Republican Party ===
During the 1960s, the vocal opposition of many politicians and officials, the use of tax dollars to support the Mississippi Sovereignty Commission, which spied on citizens and helped achieve economic boycotts of civil rights activists; and the violent tactics of Ku Klux Klan members and sympathizers gave Mississippi a reputation as a reactionary state. The state was the last to repeal Prohibition and to ratify the Thirteenth Amendment, in 1966 and 2013, respectively. In 1964 Republican presidential candidate Barry Goldwater won Mississippi with a landslide 87% of the vote. Goldwater had opposed the Civil Rights Act of 1964, a stance that deeply resonated with the state's conservative, white electorate. As in other Southern states, the Republican Party won increasing support from white conservatives. In 1991 Kirk Fordice was elected as the first Republican governor of Mississippi since 1876. The three majority-white congressional districts elect Republican candidates; only the majority-black 2nd congressional district has returned Democrats. In 2011 the Republicans finally won control of the state legislature.

== 21st century ==
Mississippi in recent years has been noted for its political conservatism, improved civil rights record, and increasing industrialization. In addition, a decision in 1990 to permit riverboat gambling has led to economic gains for the state. However, the state lost an estimated $500,000 per day in tax revenue following Hurricane Katrina's severe damage to several riverboat casinos in August 2005.

Gambling towns in Mississippi include Gulfport and Biloxi on the Gulf Coast; Vicksburg, Natchez, Tunica Resorts, and Greenville on the Mississippi River; and the town of Philadelphia in the interior. Prior to Katrina, Mississippi was the second-largest gambling state in the Union in terms of its revenues, after Nevada and ahead of New Jersey.

=== Hurricanes ===
- August 17, 1969 – Category 5 Hurricane Camille hit the Mississippi coast, killing 248 people and causing US$1.5 billion in damage.
- September 12, 1979 – Hurricane Frederic
- September 2, 1985 – Hurricane Elena
- September 28, 1998 – Hurricane Georges
- August 29, 2005 – Hurricane Katrina caused the greatest destruction across the entire 90 miles (140 km) of Mississippi Gulf coast from Louisiana to Alabama.

== Literature ==
Mississippi has been noted for its authors, including Nobel Prize-winner William Faulkner, as well as William Alexander Percy, Walker Percy, Shelby Foote, Stark Young, Eudora Welty, John Grisham and Anne Moody.

== See also ==
- History of the Southern United States
- Black Belt in the American South
- Deep South
- Timeline of Jackson, Mississippi
- African Americans in Mississippi
- History of slavery in Mississippi
- List of historical societies in Mississippi
