= Index of Mississippi-related articles =

The location of the state of Mississippi in the United States of America

The following is an alphabetical list of articles related to the U.S. state of Mississippi.

== 0–9 ==
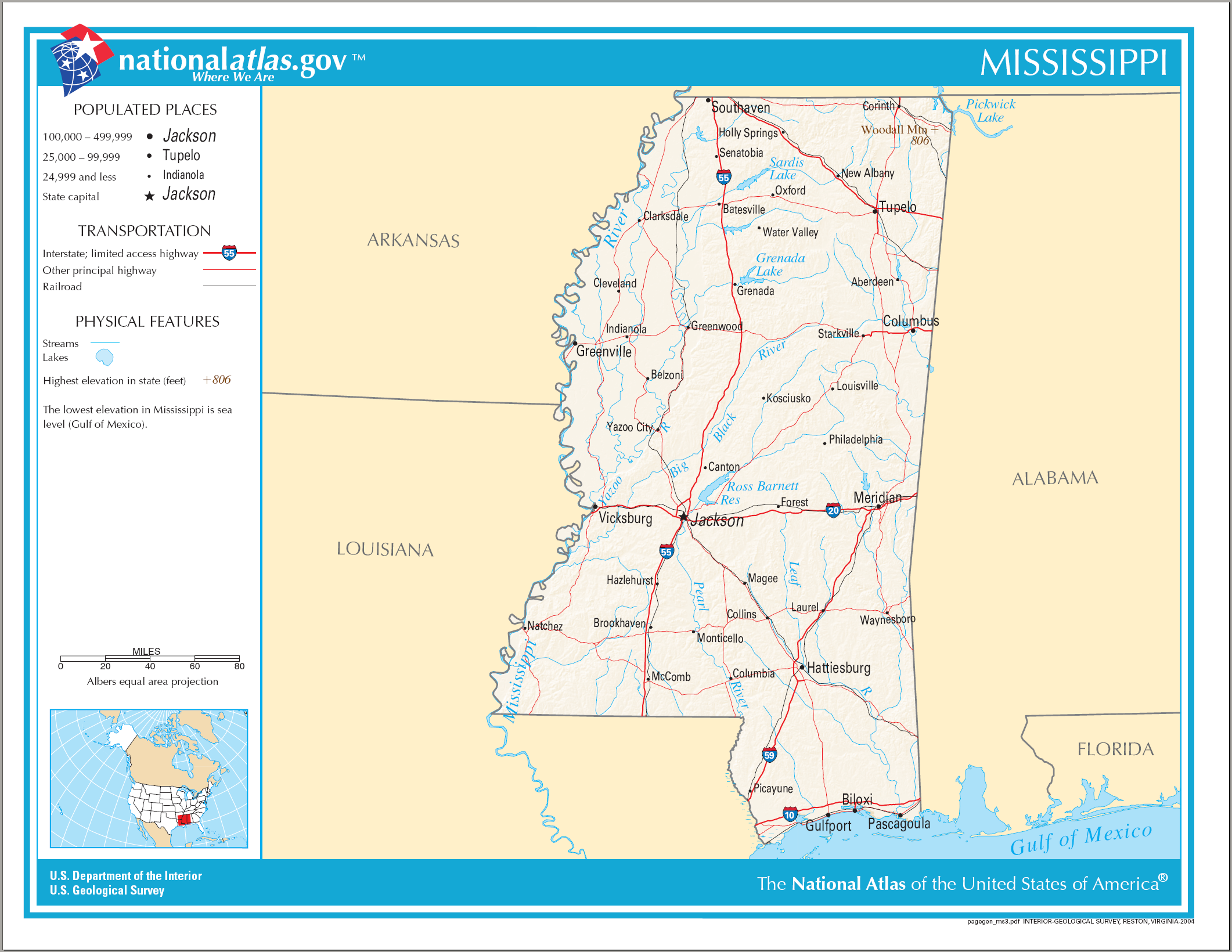
An enlargeable map of the state of Mississippi

- .ms.us – Internet second-level domain for the state of Mississippi
- 20th state to join the United States of America

== A ==
- Abortion in Mississippi
- Adams-Onís Treaty of 1819
- Adjacent states:
  - State of Alabama
  - State of Arkansas
  - State of Louisiana
  - State of Tennessee
- African Americans in Mississippi
- Agriculture in Mississippi
- Airports in Mississippi
- Arboreta in Mississippi
  - commons:Category:Arboreta in Mississippi
- Archaeology of Mississippi
  - Category:Archaeological sites in Mississippi
    - commons:Category:Archaeological sites in Mississippi
- Architecture of Mississippi
- Art museums and galleries in Mississippi
  - commons:Category:Art museums and galleries in Mississippi
- Astronomical observatories in Mississippi
  - commons:Category:Astronomical observatories in Mississippi

== B ==
- Battle of Big Black River Bridge
- Battle of Booneville
- Battle of Brices Cross Roads
- Battle of Camp Davies
- Battle of Champion Hill
- Battle of Chickasaw Bayou
- Battle of Coffeeville
- Battle of Grand Gulf
- Battle of Iuka
- Battle of Jackson, Mississippi
- Battle of Okolona
- Battle of Port Gibson
- Battle of Raymond
- Battle of Snyder's Bluff
- Black Belt
- Botanical gardens in Mississippi
  - commons:Category:Botanical gardens in Mississippi
- Buildings and structures in Mississippi
  - commons:Category:Buildings and structures in Mississippi

== C ==
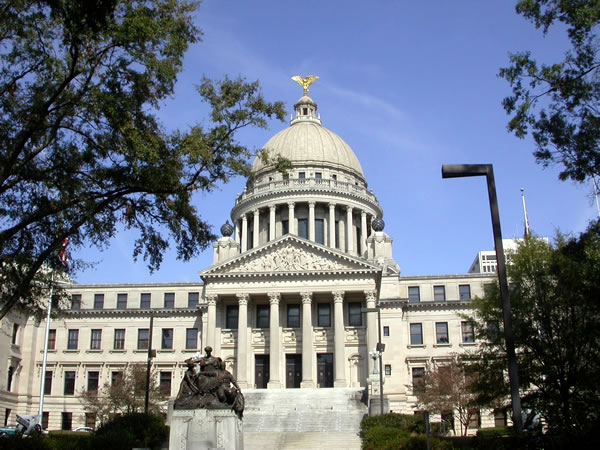
The Mississippi State Capitol in Jackson

The coat of arms of Mississippi

- Capital of the state of Mississippi
- Capitol of the State of Mississippi
  - commons:Category:Mississippi State Capitol
- Capital punishment in Mississippi
- Casinos in Mississippi
- Census statistical areas of Mississippi
- Cities in Mississippi
  - commons:Category:Cities in Mississippi
- Climate of Mississippi
- Climate change in Mississippi

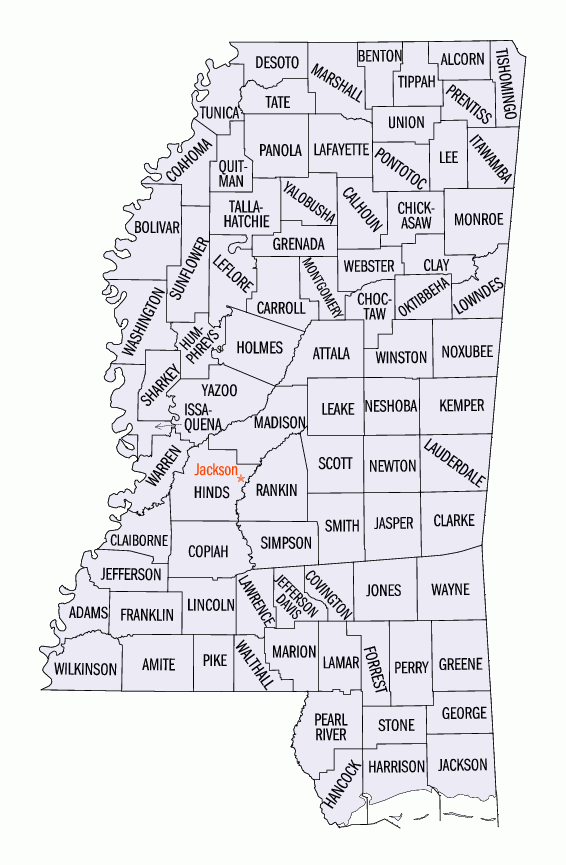
An enlargeable map of the 82 counties of the state of Mississippi

- Colleges and universities in Mississippi
  - commons:Category:Universities and colleges in Mississippi
- Communications in Mississippi
  - commons:Category:Communications in Mississippi
- Companies in Mississippi
- Congressional districts of Mississippi
- Constitution of the State of Mississippi
- Convention centers in Mississippi
  - commons:Category:Convention centers in Mississippi
- Counties of the state of Mississippi
  - commons:Category:Counties in Mississippi
- Culture of Mississippi
  - commons:Category:Mississippi culture

== D ==
- Demographics of Mississippi

== E ==
- Economy of Mississippi
  - Category:Economy of Mississippi
    - commons:Category:Economy of Mississippi
- Education in Mississippi
  - Category:Education in Mississippi
    - commons:Category:Education in Mississippi
- Elections in Mississippi
  - Category:Elections in Mississippi
    - commons:Category:Elections in Mississippi (state)
- Category:Environment of Mississippi
  - commons:Category:Environment of Mississippi

== F ==
The flag of the state of Mississippi

- Flag of the state of Mississippi
- Forts in Mississippi
  - Category:Forts in Mississippi
    - commons:Category:Forts in Mississippi

== G ==
The Great Seal of the State of Mississippi

- Geography of Mississippi
  - Category:Geography of Mississippi
    - commons:Category:Geography of Mississippi
- Geology of Mississippi
  - commons:Category:Geology of Mississippi
- Ghost towns in Mississippi
  - Category:Ghost towns in Mississippi
    - commons:Category:Ghost towns in Mississippi
- Ghosts of Mississippi
- Government of the state of Mississippi website
  - Category:Government of Mississippi
    - commons:Category:Government of Mississippi
- Governor of the State of Mississippi
  - List of governors of Mississippi
- Great Seal of the State of Mississippi
- Gun laws in Mississippi

== H ==
- High schools of Mississippi
- Higher education in Mississippi
- Highway routes in Mississippi
- Hiking trails in Mississippi
  - commons:Category:Hiking trails in Mississippi
- History of Mississippi
  - Historical outline of Mississippi
- History of Italians in Mississippi
- Holly Springs Raid
- Hospitals in Mississippi
- House of Representatives of the State of Mississippi

== I ==
- Images of Mississippi
  - commons:Category:Mississippi
- Interstate highway routes in Mississippi
- Islands of Mississippi

== J ==
- Jackson, Mississippi, state capital since 1821

== L ==
- Lakes of Mississippi
  - commons:Category:Lakes of Mississippi
- Landmarks in Mississippi
  - commons:Category:Landmarks in Mississippi
- LGBT rights in Mississippi
- Lieutenant Governor of the State of Mississippi
- Lists related to the state of Mississippi:
  - List of airports in Mississippi
  - List of census-designated places in Mississippi
  - List of census statistical areas in Mississippi
  - List of cities in Mississippi
  - List of colleges and universities in Mississippi
  - List of United States congressional districts in Mississippi
  - List of counties in Mississippi
  - List of forts in Mississippi
  - List of ghost towns in Mississippi
  - List of governors of Mississippi
  - List of high schools in Mississippi
  - List of highway routes in Mississippi
  - List of hospitals in Mississippi
  - List of individuals executed in Mississippi
  - List of Interstate highway routes in Mississippi
  - List of islands of Mississippi
  - List of law enforcement agencies in Mississippi
  - List of lieutenant governors of Mississippi
  - List of museums in Mississippi
  - List of National Historic Landmarks in Mississippi
  - List of newspapers in Mississippi
  - List of people from Mississippi
  - List of radio stations in Mississippi
  - List of railroads in Mississippi
  - List of Registered Historic Places in Mississippi
  - List of rivers of Mississippi
  - List of school districts in Mississippi
  - List of state highway routes in Mississippi
  - List of state parks in Mississippi
  - List of state prisons in Mississippi
  - List of symbols of the state of Mississippi
  - List of television stations in Mississippi
  - List of Mississippi's congressional delegations
  - List of United States congressional districts in Mississippi
  - List of United States representatives from Mississippi
  - List of United States senators from Mississippi
  - List of U.S. highway routes in Mississippi
  - List of unsigned state highways in Mississippi

== M ==
- Maps of Mississippi
  - commons:Category:Maps of Mississippi
- Mass media in Mississippi
- Mississippi website
  - Category:Mississippi
    - commons:Category:Mississippi
- Mississippi Book Festival
- Mississippi Freelance
- Mississippi Highway 572
- Mississippi in the American Civil War
- Mississippi River
- Mississippi SB 2179
- Mississippi State Capitol
- Mississippi State Sovereignty Commission
- Mountains of Mississippi
  - commons:Category:Mountains of Mississippi
- MS – United States Postal Service postal code for the state of Mississippi
- Museums in Mississippi
  - Category:Museums in Mississippi
    - commons:Category:Museums in Mississippi
- Music of Mississippi
  - commons:Category:Music of Mississippi
  - Category:Musical groups from Mississippi
  - Category:Musicians from Mississippi

== N ==
- Natchez, Mississippi, first territorial capital 1798–1802, first state capital 1817-1821
- Natchez Trace
- National forests of Mississippi
  - commons:Category:National Forests of Mississippi
- Natural history of Mississippi
  - commons:Category:Natural history of Mississippi
- Newspapers of Mississippi

== P ==
- People from Mississippi
  - Category:People from Mississippi
    - commons:Category:People from Mississippi
    - Category:People from Mississippi by populated place
    - Category:People from Mississippi by county
    - Category:People from Mississippi by occupation
- Politics of Mississippi
  - commons:Category:Politics of Mississippi
- Protected areas of Mississippi
  - commons:Category:Protected areas of Mississippi

== R ==
- Radio stations in Mississippi
- Railroads in Mississippi
- Registered historic places in Mississippi
  - commons:Category:Registered Historic Places in Mississippi
  - Category:Religion in Mississippi
    - commons:Category:Religion in Mississippi
- Rivers of Mississippi
  - commons:Category:Rivers of Mississippi

== S ==
- Same-sex marriage in Mississippi
- School districts of Mississippi
- Scouting in Mississippi
- Second Battle of Corinth
- Senate of the State of Mississippi
- Settlements in Mississippi
  - Cities in Mississippi
  - Towns in Mississippi
  - Villages in Mississippi
  - Census Designated Places in Mississippi
  - Other unincorporated communities in Mississippi
  - List of ghost towns in Mississippi
- Siege of Corinth
- Siege of Corinth Confederate order of battle
- Siege of Corinth Union order of battle
- Siege of Vicksburg
- Skirmish at Abbeville
- Slugburger
- Sports in Mississippi
  - commons:Category:Sports in Mississippi
- Sports venues in Mississippi
  - commons:Category:Sports venues in Mississippi
- State Capitol of Mississippi
- State highway routes in Mississippi
- State of Mississippi website
  - Constitution of the State of Mississippi
  - Government of the state of Mississippi
    - Category:Government of Mississippi
      - commons:Category:Government of Mississippi
  - Executive branch of the government of the state of Mississippi
    - Governor of the state of Mississippi
  - Legislative branch of the government of the state of Mississippi
    - Legislature of the State of Mississippi
      - Senate of the State of Mississippi
      - House of Representatives of the State of Mississippi
  - Judicial branch of the government of the state of Mississippi
    - Supreme Court of the State of Mississippi
- State parks of Mississippi
  - commons:Category:State parks of Mississippi
- State prisons of Mississippi
- Steele's Bayou expedition
- Structures in Mississippi
  - commons:Category:Buildings and structures in Mississippi
- Superfund sites in Mississippi
- Supreme Court of the State of Mississippi
- Symbols of the state of Mississippi
  - Category:Symbols of Mississippi
    - commons:Category:Symbols of Mississippi

== T ==
- Telecommunications in Mississippi
  - commons:Category:Communications in Mississippi
- Telephone area codes in Mississippi
- Television shows set in Mississippi
- Television stations in Mississippi
- Tennessee Valley Authority
- Territory of Mississippi
- Thank God for Mississippi
- Theatre in Mississippi
  - commons:Category:Theatres in Mississippi
- Tourism in Mississippi website
  - commons:Category:Tourism in Mississippi
- Trail of Tears, 1830–1838
- Transportation in Mississippi
  - Category:Transportation in Mississippi
    - commons:Category:Transport in Mississippi
- Twin Creeks Technologies

== U ==
- United States of America
  - States of the United States of America
  - United States census statistical areas of Mississippi
  - Mississippi's congressional delegations
  - United States congressional districts in Mississippi
  - United States Court of Appeals for the Fifth Circuit
  - United States District Court for the Northern District of Mississippi
  - United States District Court for the Southern District of Mississippi
  - United States representatives from Mississippi
  - United States senators from Mississippi
- Universities and colleges in Mississippi
  - commons:Category:Universities and colleges in Mississippi
- U.S. highway routes in Mississippi
- Unsigned state highways in Mississippi
- US-MS – ISO 3166-2:US region code for the state of Mississippi

== V ==
- Vehicle registration plates of Mississippi
- Vietnamese in Mississippi

== W ==
- Washington, Mississippi, territorial capital 1802-1817
- Water parks in Mississippi
- White's Slough
  Wikimedia
  - Wikimedia Commons:Category:Mississippi
    - commons:Category:Maps of Mississippi
  - Wikinews:Category:Mississippi
    - Wikinews:Portal:Mississippi
  - Wikipedia Category:Mississippi
    - Wikipedia Portal:Mississippi
    - Wikipedia:WikiProject Mississippi
      - Category:WikiProject Mississippi articles
      - Category:WikiProject Mississippi participants

== Z ==
- Zoos in Mississippi
  - commons:Category:Zoos in Mississippi

== See also ==
- Topic overview:
  - Mississippi
  - Outline of Mississippi
