= Mississippi Writers Trail =

The Mississippi Writers Trail is a series of historical markers which celebrate the literary, social, historical, and cultural contributions of Mississippi's most acclaimed and influential writers. An advisory committee of state cultural agencies oversees the process of installing historical markers in places of significance to an author's life. To emphasize the literary focus of the trail, the markers are cast in the shape of an open book and display information about the author's life with the goal of educating the public about the legacy of Mississippi writers.

== Overview ==
The Mississippi Writers Trail debuted on the State Capitol grounds in Jackson, Mississippi at the 2018 Mississippi Book Festival with an unveiling of two marker prototypes honoring Eudora Welty and Jesmyn Ward, connecting the past and present contributions of Mississippi authors. The program runs as an unfunded mandate which means these literary markers are produced and installed as funding becomes available.

Initial support from a Statehood Grant through the National Endowment for the Humanities was key for installing the first phase of markers for the Trail. The Writers Trail has received additional support from the Mississippi Delta National Heritage Area, the Mississippi Gulf Coast National Heritage Area, and the City of Clarksdale, Mississippi to install markers for authors located within the service area of each organization.

== Selection and placement process ==
The Mississippi Writers Trail Advisory Committee, composed of many state cultural institutions, selects several scholars who identify potential authors for inclusion in the Writers Trail and to draft the text for each marker. Final locations are determined in consultation with local communities; authors or their surviving families are consulted for the market text as well.

=== Mississippi Writers Trail Advisory Committee ===
- Mississippi Arts Commission
- Mississippi Development Authority, Visit Mississippi
- Mississippi Humanities Council
- Mississippi Library Commission
- Mississippi Department of History and Archives
- Community Foundation for Mississippi
- Mississippi Book Festival

== Mississippi Writers Trail markers ==
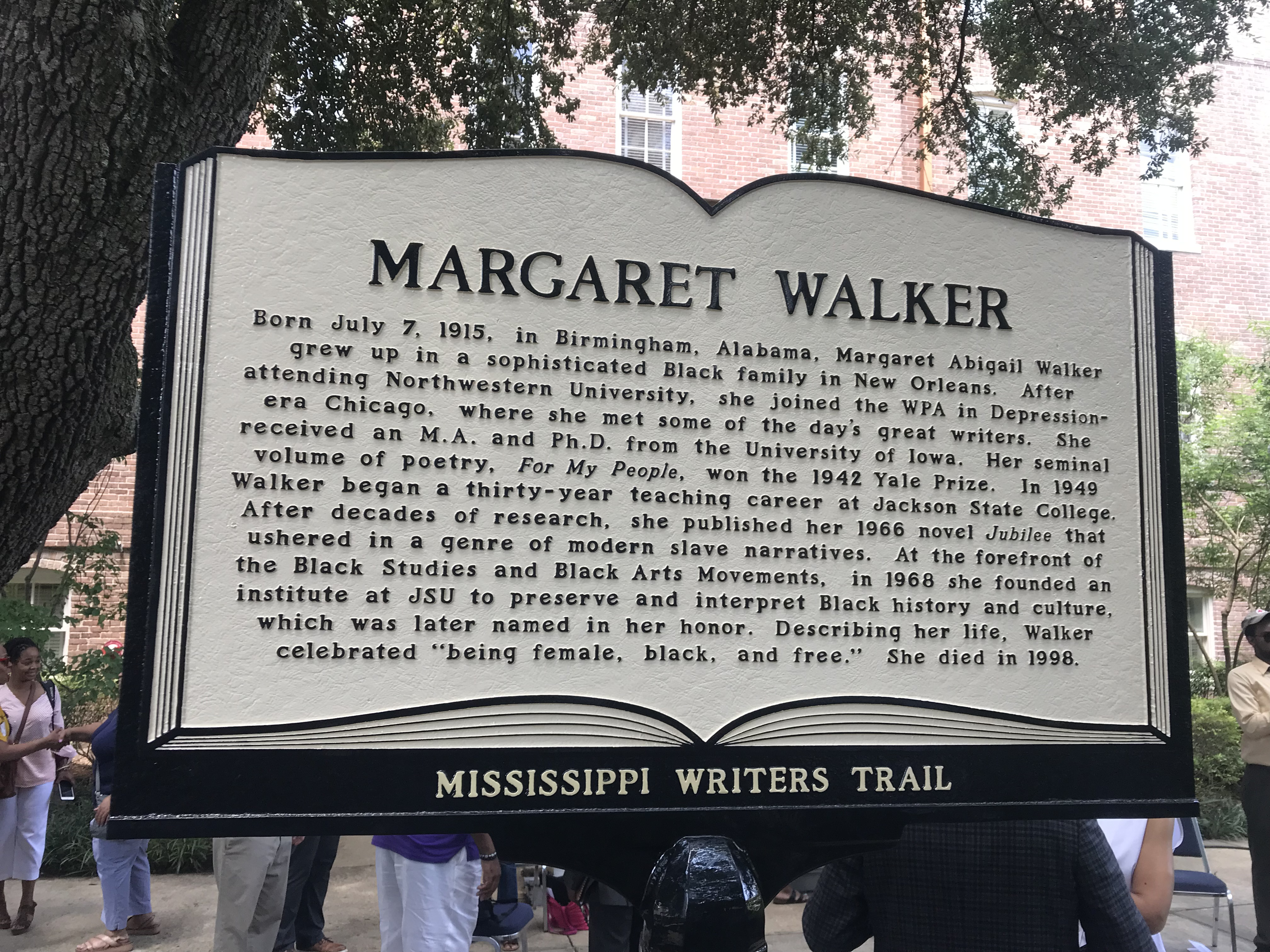
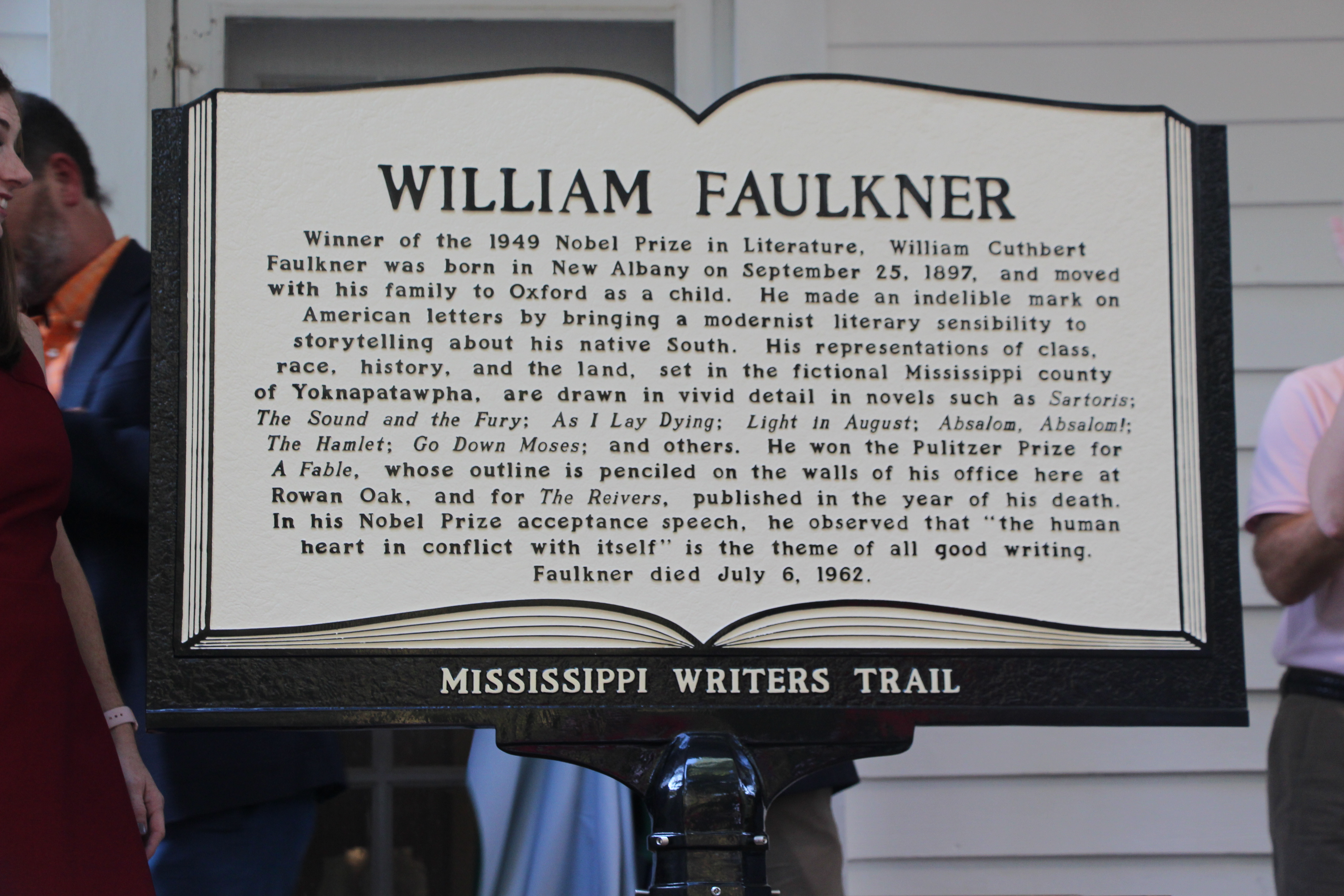
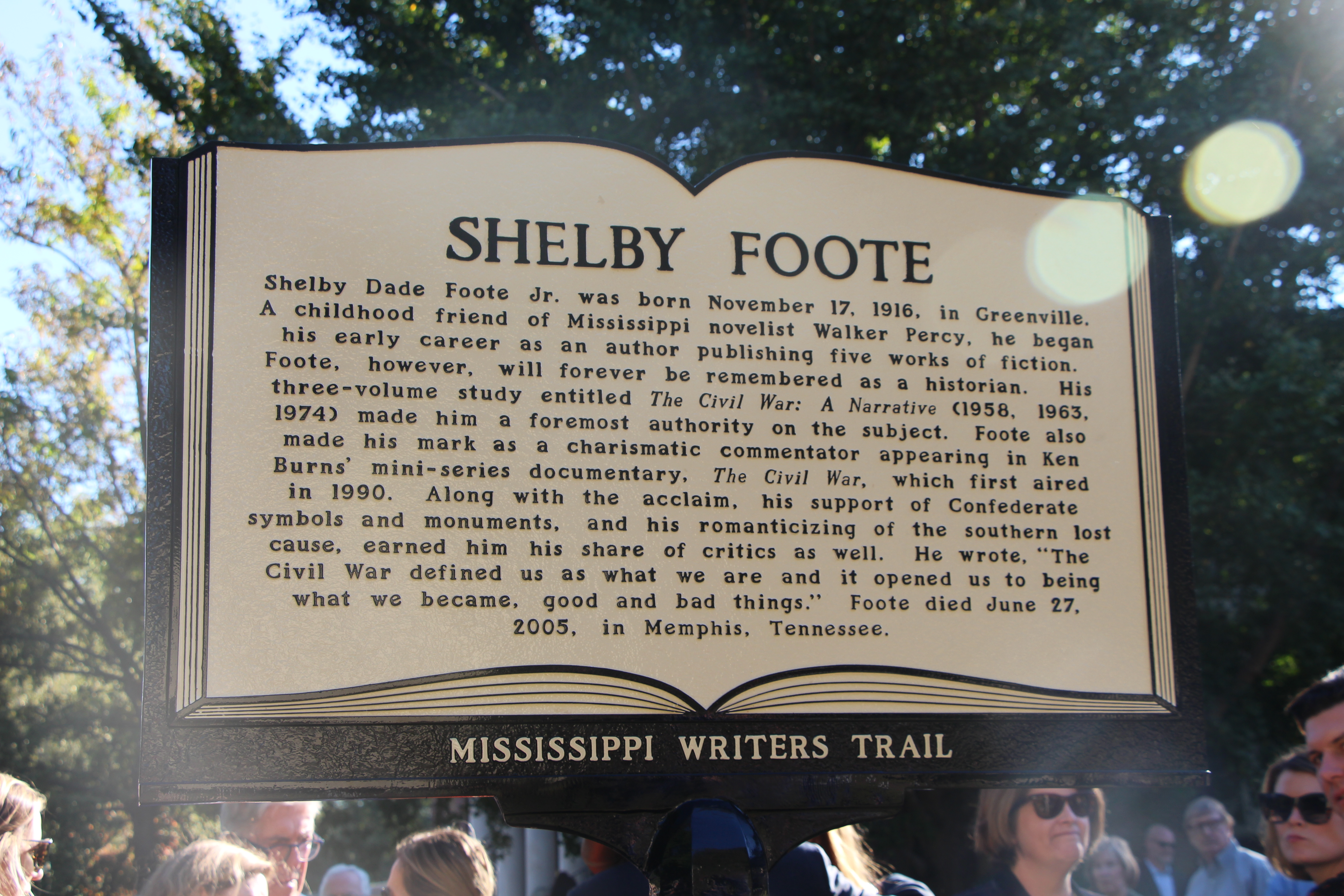
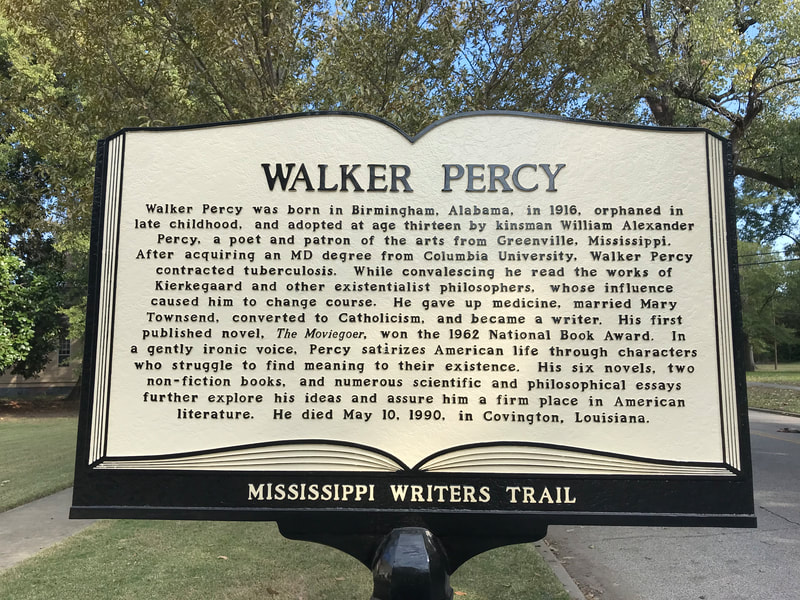
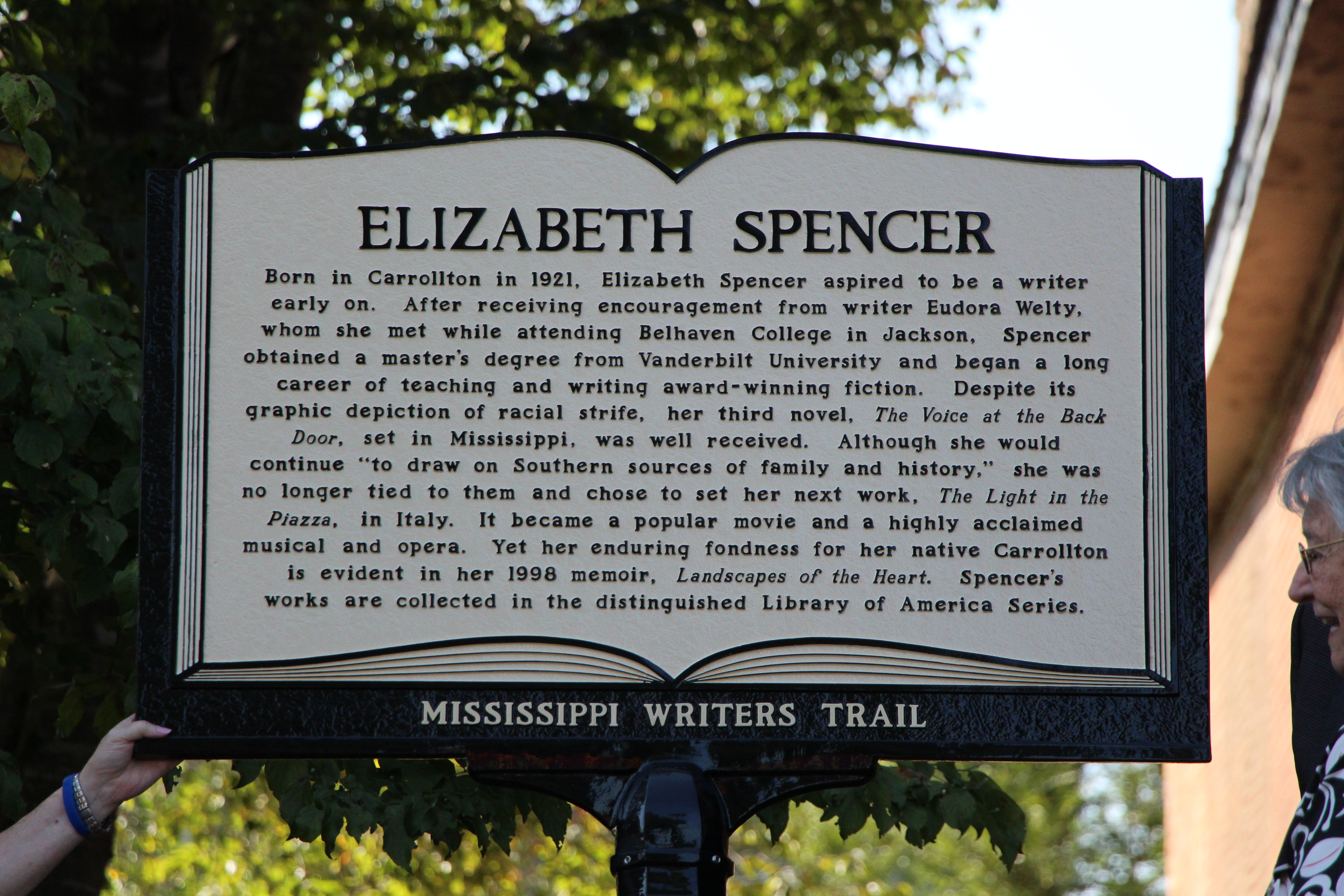
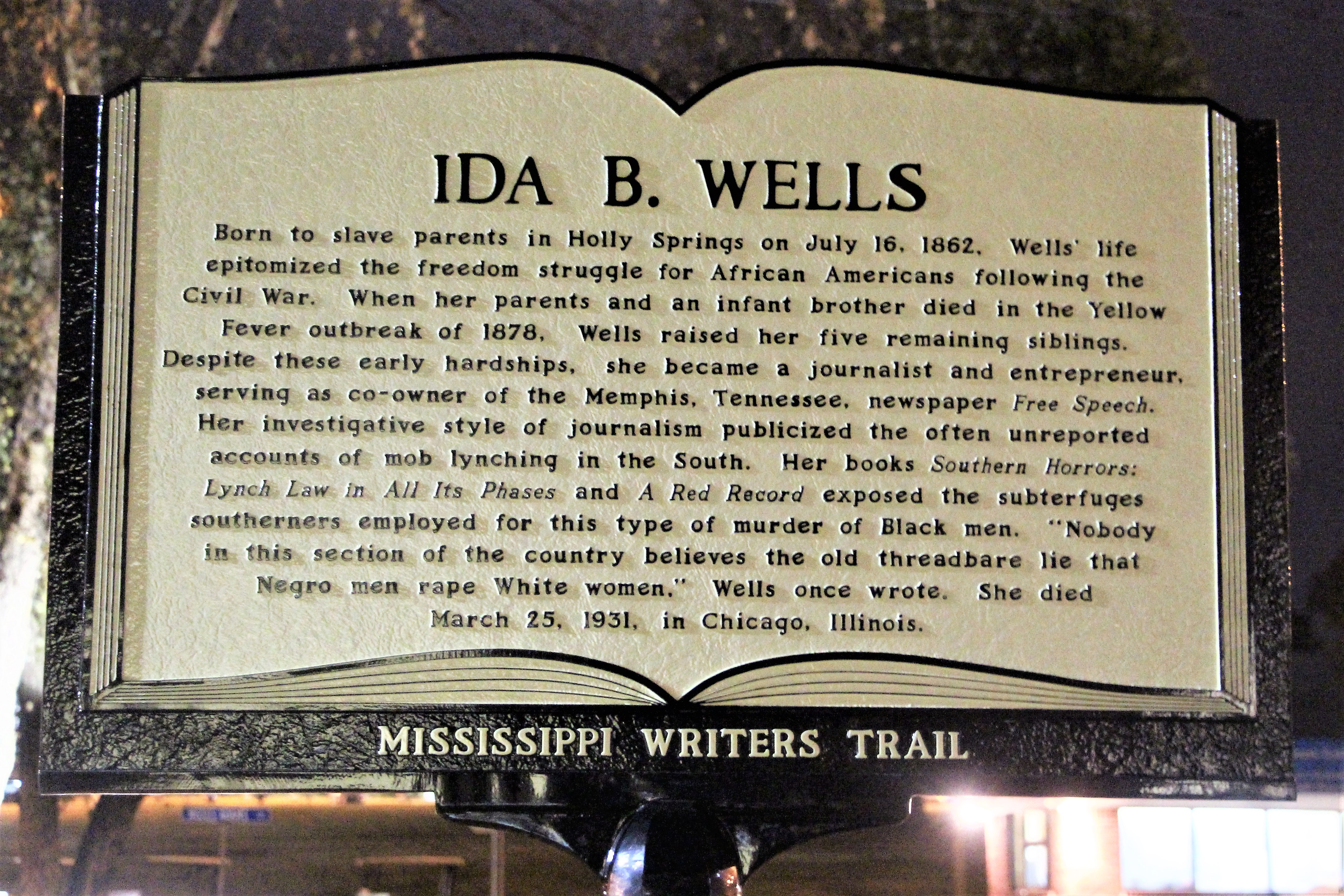
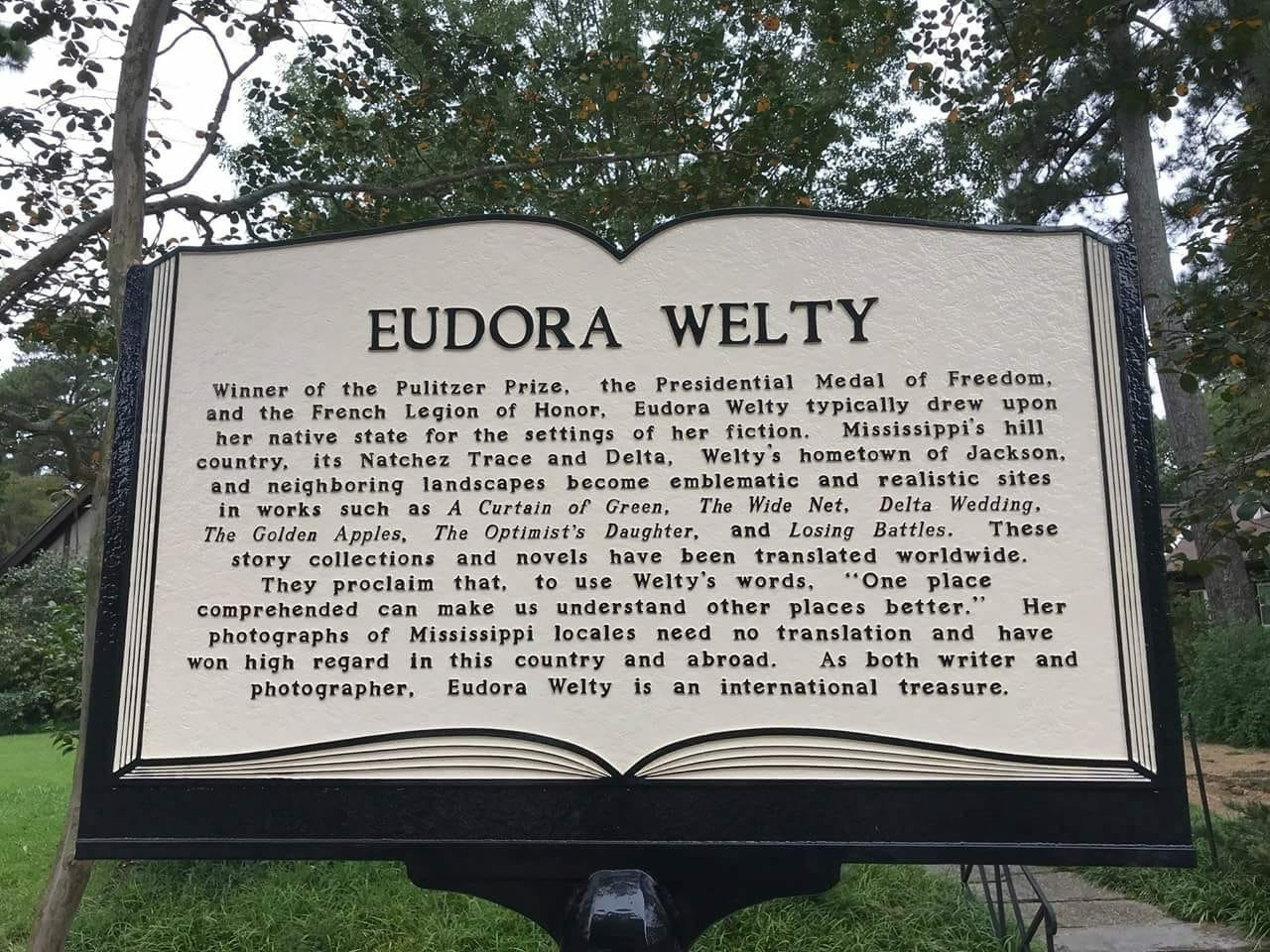
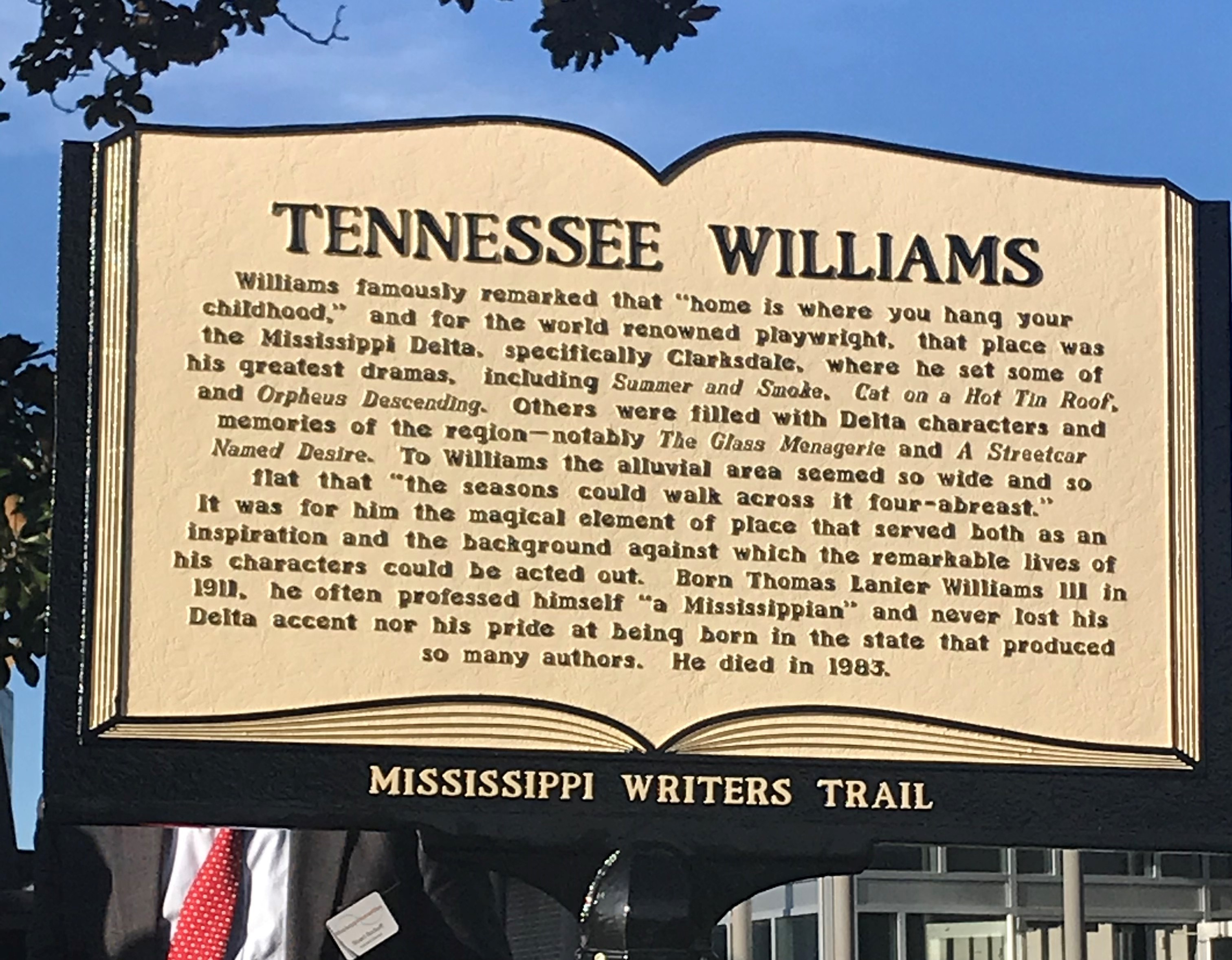
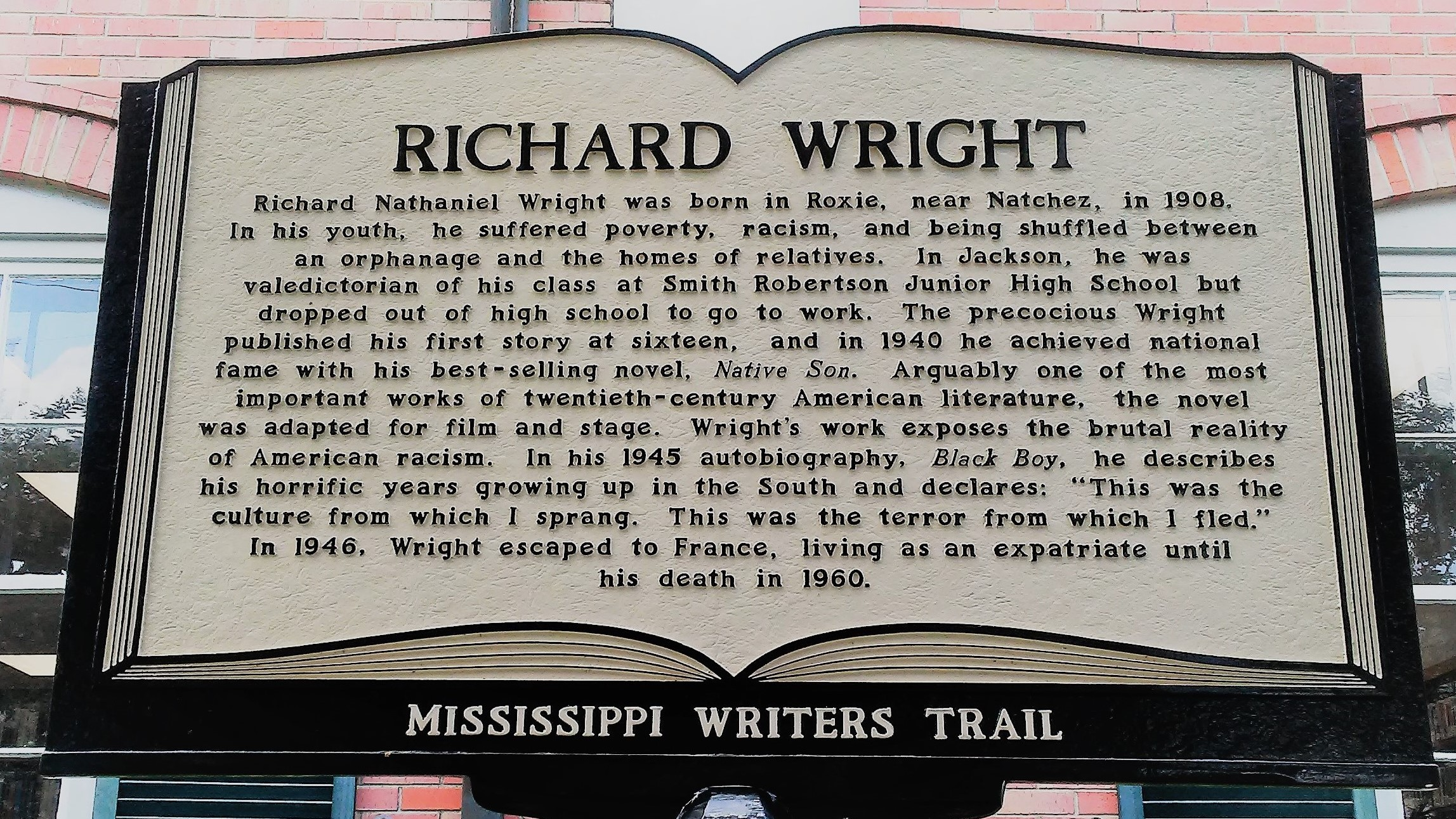
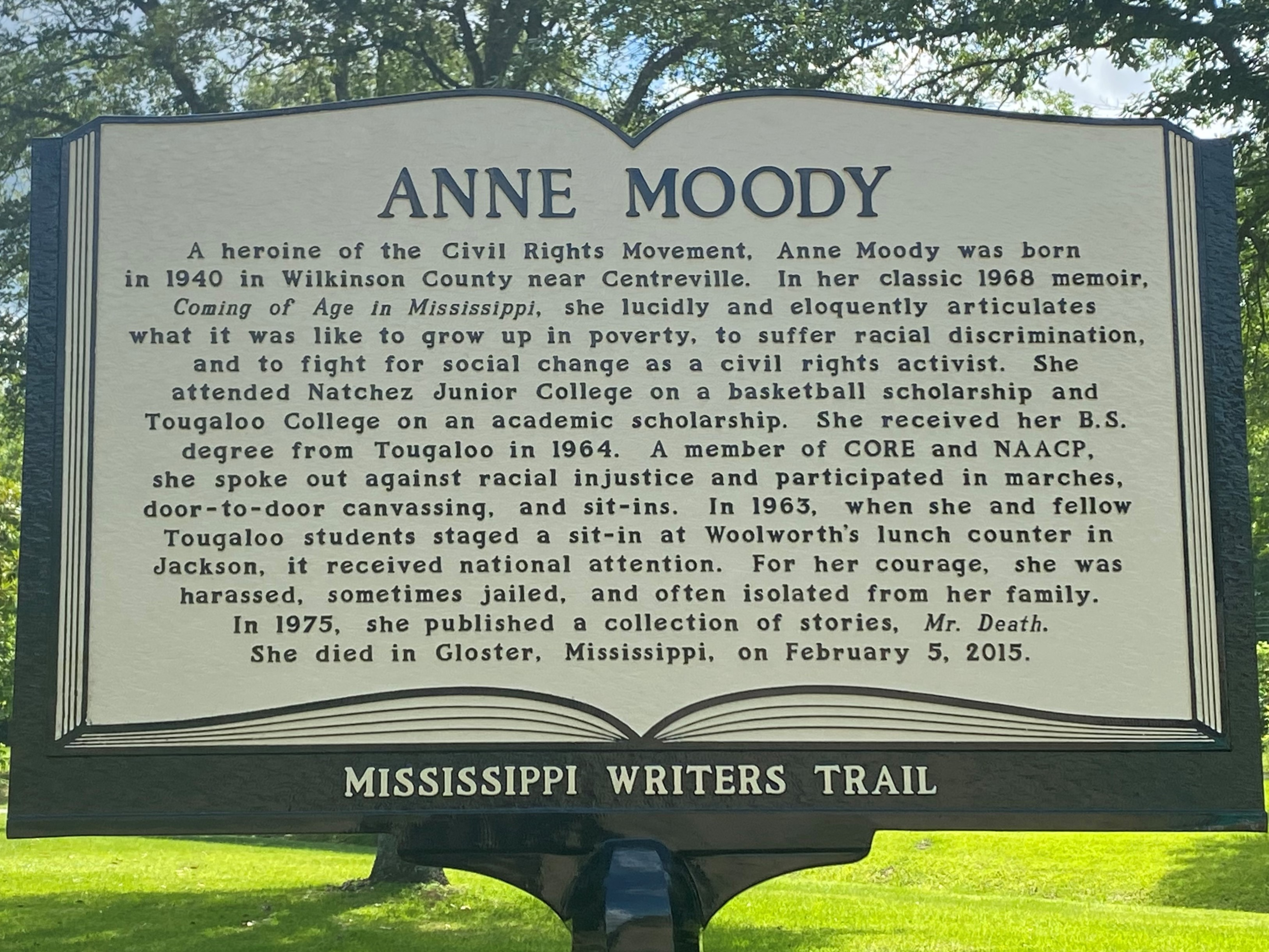
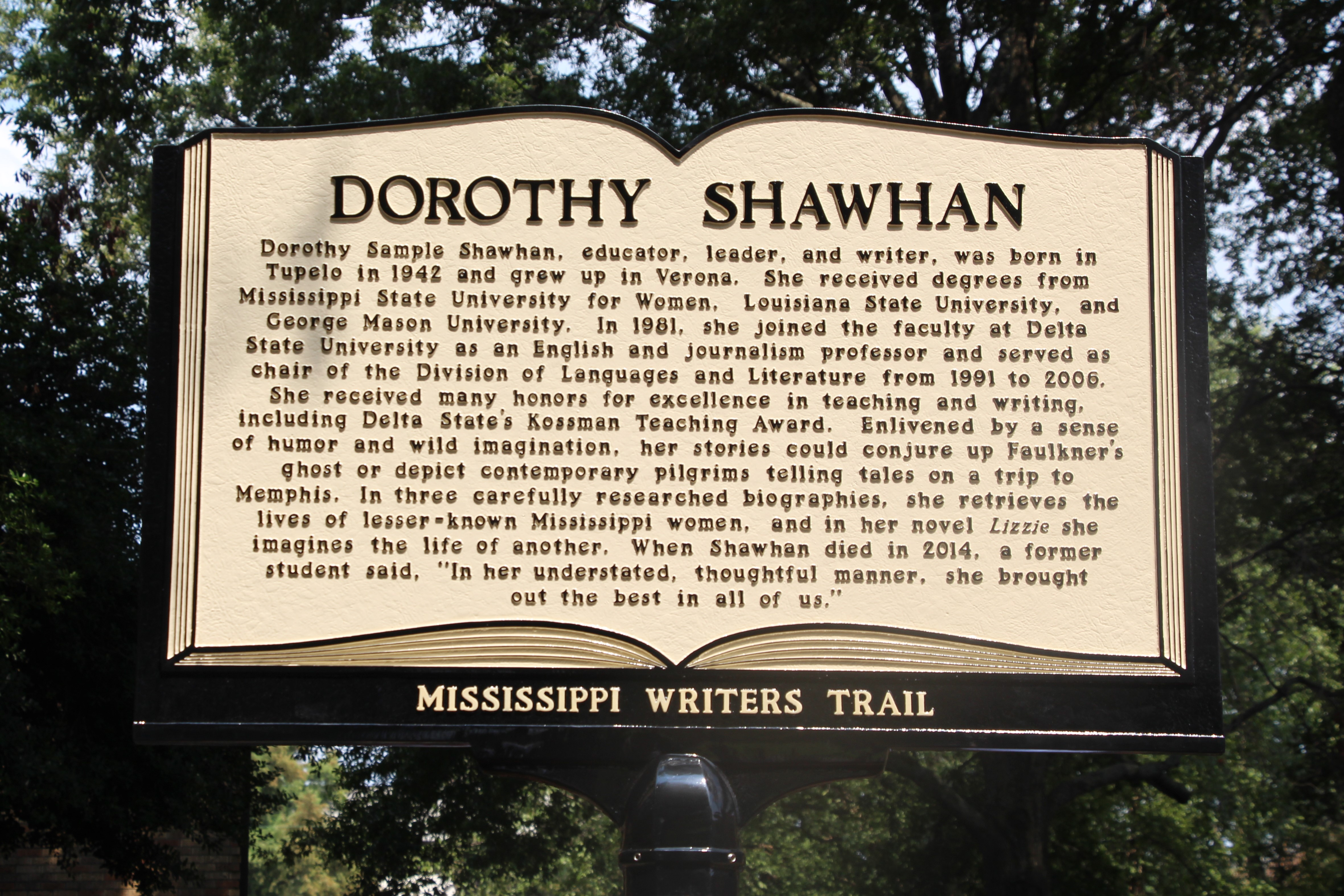
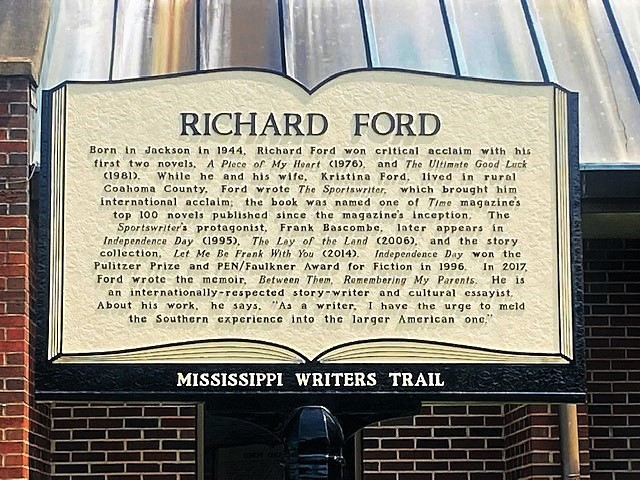
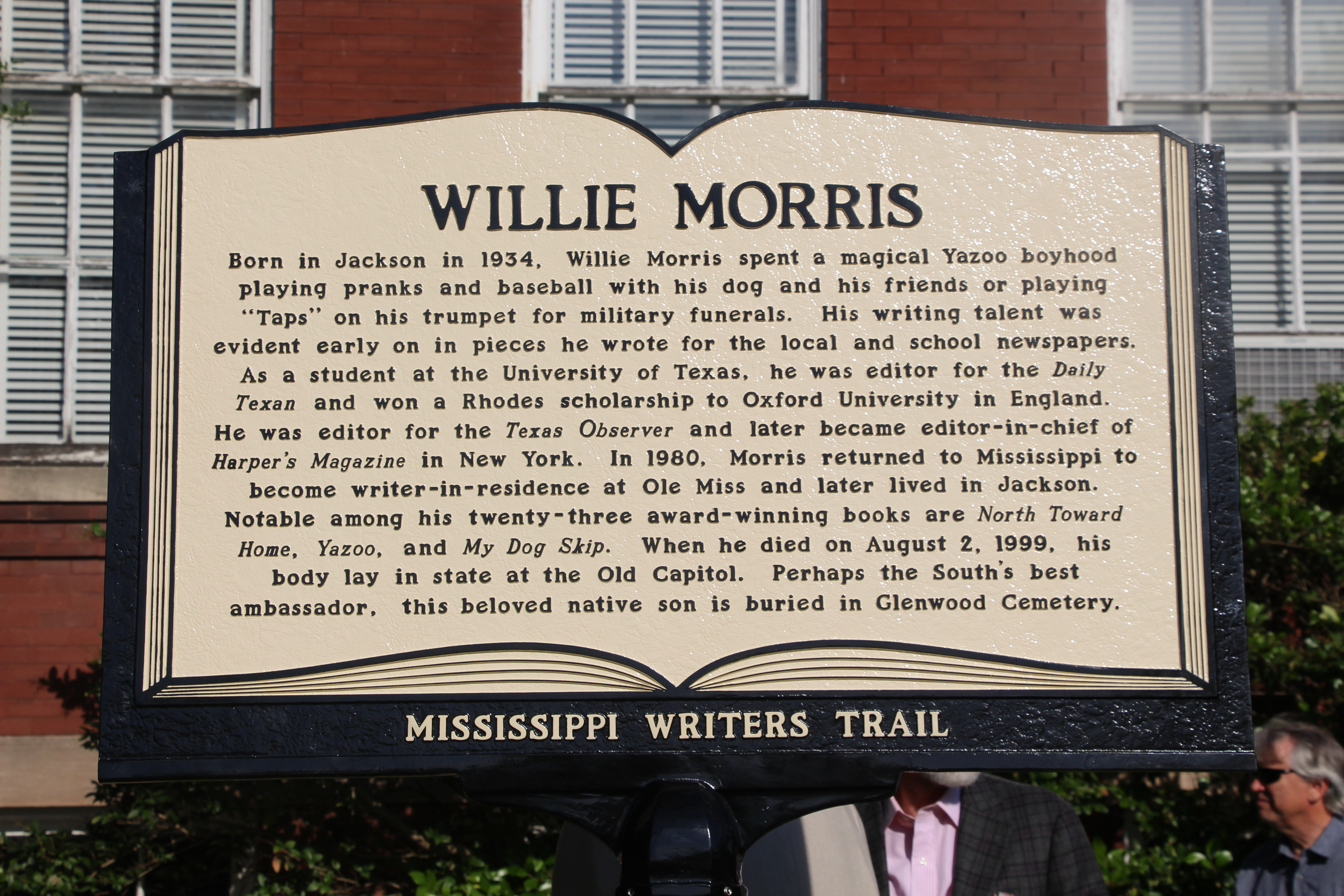
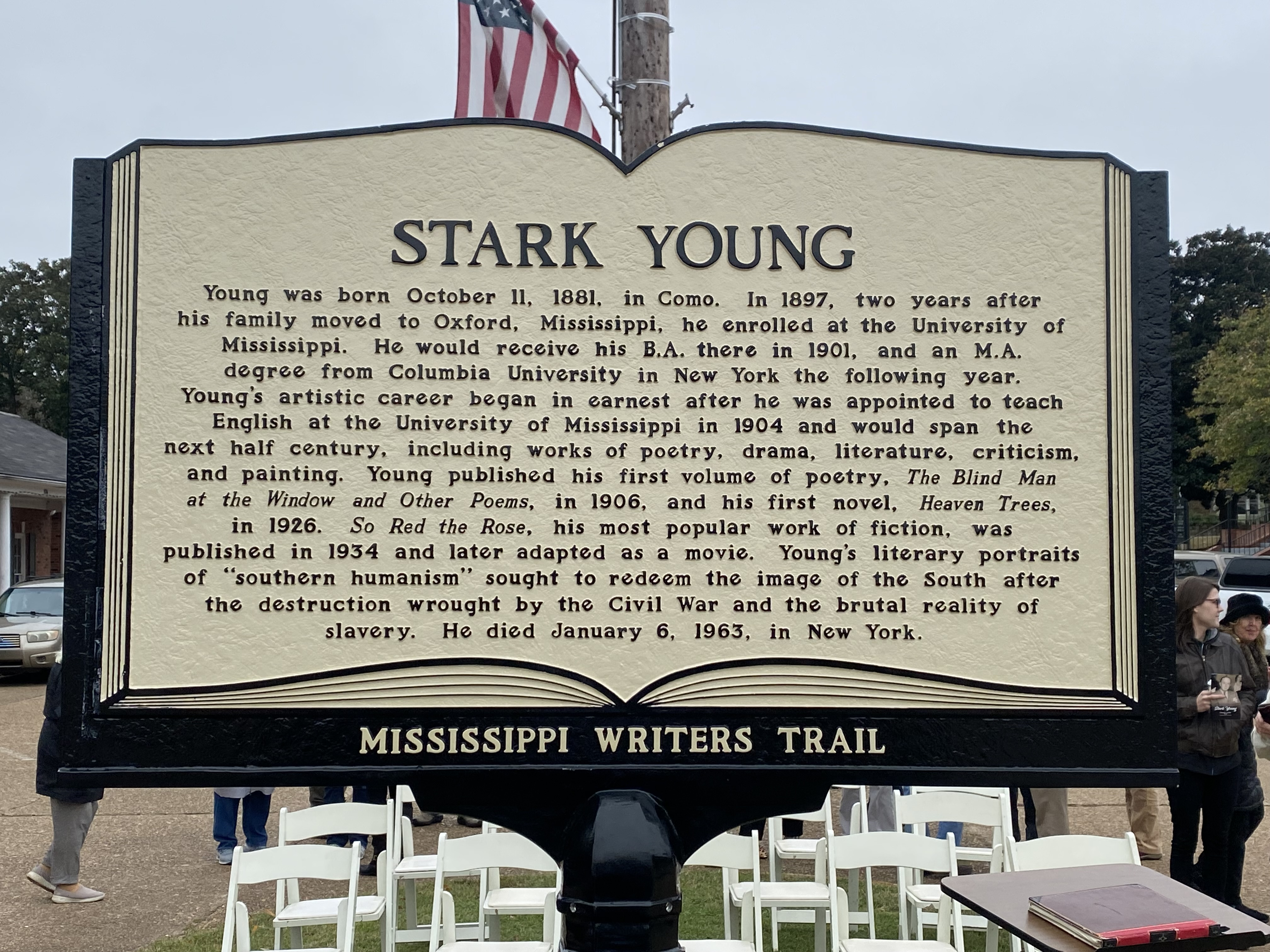
Writer	Marker Location	City	Marker Photo	Date of Installation
Margaret Walker Alexander	Margaret Walker Center, Jackson State University	Jackson, MS		July 8, 2019
William Faulkner	Rowan Oak, Faulkner Home and Museum	Oxford, MS		October 10, 2019
Shelby Foote	E.E. Bass Cultural Arts Center	Greenville, MS		October 18, 2019
Walker Percy	E.E. Bass Cultural Arts Center	Greenville, MS		October 18, 2019
Elizabeth Spencer	Merrill Museum	Carrollton, MS		October 5, 2019
Ida B. Wells	Rust College	Holly Springs, MS		November 7, 2019
Eudora Welty	Eudora Welty House and Garden	Jackson, MS		September 10, 2018
Tennessee Williams	Cutrer Mansion	Clarksdale, MS		October 17, 2019
Richard Wright	George W. Armstrong Library	Natchez, MS		July 23, 2020
Anne Moody	Louis Gaulden and Riquita Jackson Family Memorial Park	Centreville, MS		May 26, 2021
Dorothy Shawhan	Wright Gallery of Kethley Hall, Delta State University	Cleveland, MS		July 23, 2021
Richard Ford	Carnegie Public Library	Clarksdale, MS		September 2, 2021
Willie Morris	Yazoo Triangle Center	Yazoo City, MS		June 4, 2022
Stark Young	Emily J Pointer Public Library	Como, MS	Mississippi Writers Trail marker in honor of Stark Young installed outside the public library in Como, Mississippi.	November 12, 2022
