= Joseph L. Mankiewicz bibliography =

A list of books and essays about Joseph L. Mankiewicz:

- Dauth, Brian, ed. (2008). Joseph L. Mankiewicz: Interviews. University Press of Mississippi. ISBN 978-1-934110-24-9.
- Dick, Bernard F. (1983). Joseph L. Mankiewicz. Twayne Publishers. ISBN 978-0-8057-9291-1.
- Geist, Kenneth L. (1978). Pictures Will Talk: The Life and Films of Joseph L. Mankiewicz. Scribner. ISBN 978-0-684-15500-5.
- Lower, Cheryl Bray; Palmer, R. Barton (2001). Joseph L. Mankiewicz: Critical Essays with an Annotated Bibliography and a Filmography. McFarland. ISBN 978-0-7864-0987-7.
- Mankiewicz, Tom; Crane, Robert (2012). My Life as a Mankiewicz: An Insider's Journey Through Hollywood. University Press of Kentucky. ISBN 0-8131-3605-9.
- Stern, Sydney Ladensohn (2019). The Brothers Mankiewicz: Hope, Heartbreak, and Hollywood Classics. University Press of Mississippi. ISBN 978-1-617-03267-7.
