= Graphic Novels for Children and Young Adults =

2017 collection of essays

Graphic Novels for Children and Young Adults: A Collection of Critical Essays
- Editor: Michelle Ann Abate, Gwen Athene Tarbox
- Language: English
- Genre: Essay Collection
- Publisher: University Press of Mississippi
- Publication date: 2017

Graphic Novels for Children and Young Adults: A Collection of Critical Essays is a 2017 collection of essays edited by Michelle Ann Abate and Gwen Athene Tarbox, published by University Press of Mississippi.

The essays are organized by topic and are grouped into respective sections. The sections are: "Graphic Novels as Comics Storytelling: Word and Image, Form and Genre" (one), "Hybrid Comics, Transmedial Storytelling, and Graphic Novels in Adaptation" (two), "The Pedagogy of the Panel: Comics Storytelling in the Classroom" (three), "Representing Gender and Sexuality in the Comics Medium" (four), and "Drawing on Identity: History, Politics, Culture" five).

== Reception ==
Joshua Roeder of Drew University wrote that the contents of the book were "exceptional", though he wished that there was "conversation about how comics studies define comics."
