= Mississippi Arts Commission =

U.S. state government agency

The Mississippi Arts Commission is an independent agency of the Mississippi state government and serves as the state's official grants-making and arts service agency. The Mississippi Arts Commission provides grant funding to both individual artists and organizations across the state. The agency was established by the Mississippi Legislature in 1968. The founding director, who was appointed by Governor John Bell Williams, was Lida Rogers. The current executive director is Malcolm White.

== Funding ==
The Mississippi Arts Commission receives annual funding from the United States federal government through the National Endowment for the Arts as well as the state legislature and private donors.

The agency provides grant funding across the state to individual artists and arts organizations as well as non-profit organizations, local municipalities, schools & universities, etc. In 2018, the Mississippi Arts Commission transitioned to a digital grants management system where applications for grant funds are submitted, reviewed, and adjudicated through its eGRANT portal.

== Programs ==
=== Governor's Arts Awards ===
"Established in 1988, the Governor’s Arts Awards recognize individuals and organizations who have made noteworthy contributions to, or achieved artistic excellence in, the state of Mississippi. The awards are presented each year by the Mississippi Arts Commission in partnership with the Governor’s Office." Every summer, members of the public nominate an artist or an arts organization to be considered for the honor. These nominations are then reviewed by a panel of judges who select several of those nominated to receive a Governor's Arts Award.

The awards ceremony is traditionally held in downtown Jackson at the Old Capitol Museum during the month of February. Recipients must agree to attend the award ceremony in person in order to receive the honor; posthumous nominations are not accepted. Past recipients have included accomplished musicians such as B.B. King, Bobby Rush, Charlie Pride, Charlie Musselwhite, and Marty Stuart; renown writers such as Willie Morris, Richard Ford, Margaret Walker, Beth Henley, John Grisham, and Natasha Trethewey; noteworthy visual artists such as Sam Gilliam, William Dunlap, Joe Overstreet, Gwendolyn Magee; and arts organizations such as the USA International Ballet Competition, Natchez Opera Festival, New Stage Theatre, and the Tougaloo College Art Collection (among many, many others). A complete list of past Governor's Awards recipients is available on the agency's website.

=== Mississippi Whole Schools ===
Mississippi Whole Schools is the state's first comprehensive statewide arts education program for preK-12 schools with a focus on an arts integrated method of instruction. This method calls for bringing the arts into daily classroom instruction with sequential, comprehensive instruction in dance, theatre, visual arts, and music.. Evaluations of the program have exhibited an increase in standardized test scores, community involvement, parental involvement, and overall teacher morale. Mississippi Whole Schools has also developed curricula adhering to Mississippi Department of Education learning standards. These curricula are available for free download on the agency's website.

=== Available Arts Curricula ===
  - Elementary Lesson Plans
  - Intermediate Lesson Plans
  - Advanced Lesson Plans

=== Mississippi Writers Trail ===
A statewide initiative to celebrate the contributions of Mississippi's writers, the Mississippi Writers Trail installs historical markers at places of significance to the author's life with the goal of educating the public about the history and legacy of Mississippi Writers. The Mississippi Writers Trail has received funding from the National Endowment for the Humanities, the Mississippi Delta National Heritage Area, and the Mississippi Gulf Coast National Heritage Area.

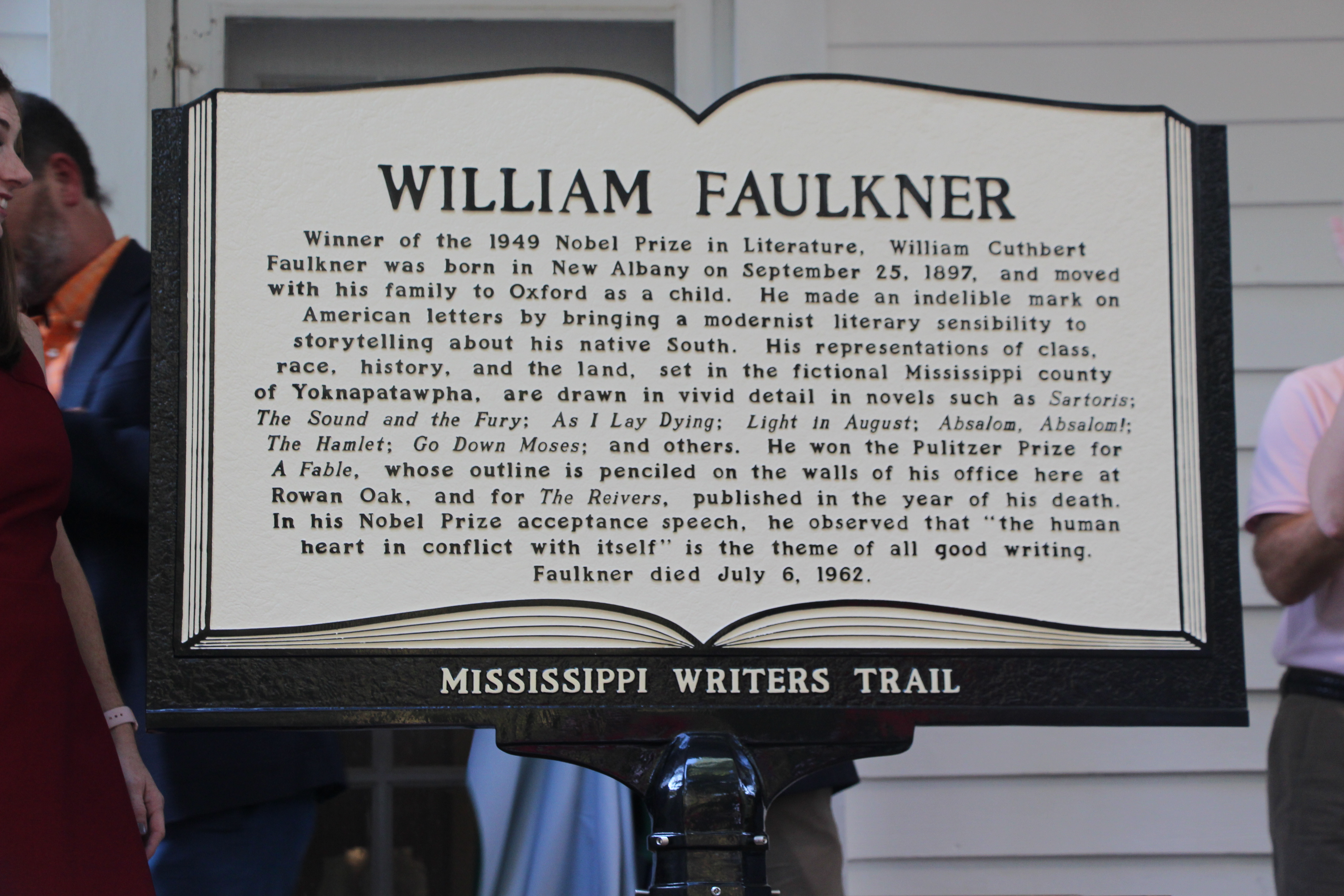
Mississippi Writers Trail Marker honoring William Faulkner installed at Rowan Oak in Oxford, MS on October 10, 2019. (funded by a grant from the National Endowment for the Humanities)

=== Mississippi Poet Laureate ===
In 1963, the Mississippi Poet Laureate program was established. Mississippi’s Poet Laureate serves as the official state poet, creating and reading appropriate poetry at state occasions and state agency activities and represents the rich cultural heritage of Mississippi. Originally a lifetime position, in 2011 the Governor's Office in partnership with the Mississippi Arts Commission and other cultural agencies restructured the office of the state's poet to a four-year term. The Mississippi Arts Commission is the chair of the Poet Laureate Selection Panel which includes

==== Past Poets Laureate ====
- Beth Ann Fennelley – 2016 – 2020
- Natasha Trethewey – 2012 – 2016
- Winifred Hamrick Farrar – 1978 – 2010
- Louise Moss Montgomery- 1973 – 1978
- Maude Willard Leet Prenshaw – 1963 – 1973

=== Poetry Out Loud, Mississippi ===
A nationwide initiative created by the National Endowment for the Arts and the Poetry Foundation, the Poetry Out Loud National Recitation Contest in Mississippi is managed by the Mississippi Arts Commission. Students in grades 9-12 participate at the classroom level where winners advance to school-wide contests, to regional competitions, to the state finals, and finally to the national contest held annually in Washington DC. State Champions receive a cash prize in addition to an all-expense-paid trip to compete at the National Contest. A list of past statewide winners is available on the agency's website.

=== Arts Day at the Capitol ===
Arts Day at the Capitol is the Mississippi Arts Commission's annual arts advocacy day held during the Mississippi Spring Legislative Session in the Mississippi State Capitol rotunda. Attendees from across the state gather to highlight the significant contributions of the arts in the lives of Mississippians.

=== Statewide Arts Conference ===
The Mississippi Arts Commission hosts the State Arts Conference in order to gather artists, arts professionals, and representatives from arts organizations for a day of networking, arts engagement, as well as professional development and training. Since 2018, the one-day conference has been hosted at the Mississippi State Capitol Building in Jackson, Mississippi.

=== Mississippi Artist & Teaching Artist Roster ===
The Mississippi Arts Commission’s Artist Roster is a listing of artists who have been accepted to the Teaching Artist Roster, the Mississippi Artist Roster, or both. Each artist or arts group applied and underwent a thorough review by a panel of artists, presenters and educators. Members of these adjudicated rosters are eligible to be hired using Mississippi Arts Commission grant funds. Members remain on the Roster for three years before being required to reapply for inclusion.

== Media ==
"Each week, members of the Mississippi Arts Commission's staff host The Mississippi Arts Hour, a radio program broadcast on Mississippi Public Broadcasting's FM and digital radio networks. The show features interviews with Mississippi artists, musicians, craftspeople, and others involved in arts and culture from around the state." Past episodes are uploaded as podcasts under the show name: Mississippi Arts Hour.

Mississippi Folklife is the official publication of the Folk and Traditional Arts program at the Mississippi Arts Commission. The print publication was established in 1927 by the Mississippi Folklore Society as The Mississippi Folklore Register by Arthur P. Hudson at the University of Mississippi. The journal remained in-and-out of publication until the early 1990s when it was restructured into a "publication at the intersections of an academic journal and a cultural magazine" under the leadership of former state folklorist Tom Rankin under the new title Mississippi Folklife. The new format enjoyed widespread readership until it went out of print in 1999. In 2012, the Mississippi Arts Commission revived the journal as an online publication including "new, original documentary work and writing, photo essays, films, reviews, interviews, and more." The journal now publishes articles in three core areas: Music, Custom, and Visual Arts.
