= Climate change in Mississippi =

Climate change in the US state of Mississippi

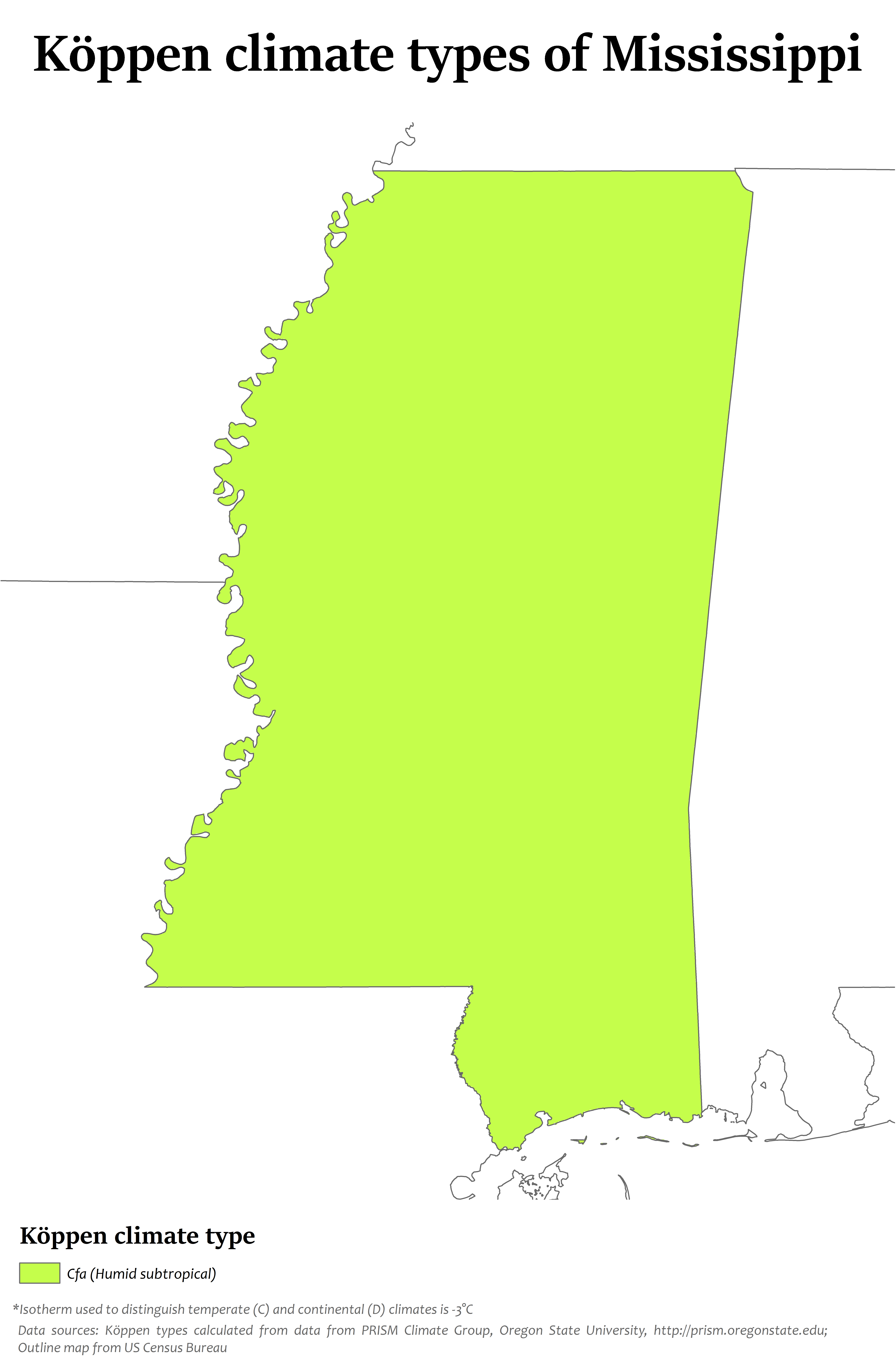
Köppen climate types in Mississippi, showing that the entire state is humid subtropical.

Climate change in Mississippi encompasses the effects of climate change, attributed to man-made increases in atmospheric carbon dioxide, in the U.S. state of Mississippi.

Studies show that Mississippi is among a string of "Deep South" states that will experience the worst effects of climate change in the United States. The United States Environmental Protection Agency (EPA) reports:

"In the coming decades, Mississippi will become warmer, and both floods and droughts may be more severe. Unlike most of the nation, Mississippi did not become warmer during the last 50 to 100 years. But soils have become drier, annual rainfall has increased, more rain arrives in heavy downpours, and sea level is rising about one inch every seven years. The changing climate is likely to increase damages from tropical storms, reduce crop yields, harm livestock, increase the number of unpleasantly hot days, and increase the risk of heat stroke and other heat-related illnesses".

== Rising seas and retreating shores ==
According to the EPA, "sea level is rising more rapidly in Mississippi than most coastal areas because the land is sinking. If the oceans and atmosphere continue to warm, sea level along the Mississippi coast is likely to rise between twenty inches and four feet in the next century. Rising sea level submerges wetlands and dry land, erodes beaches, and exacerbates coastal flooding. Coastal communities along Mississippi Sound are protected by undeveloped barrier islands, so erosion of those islands could threaten communities on the mainland".

== Storms, homes, and infrastructure ==
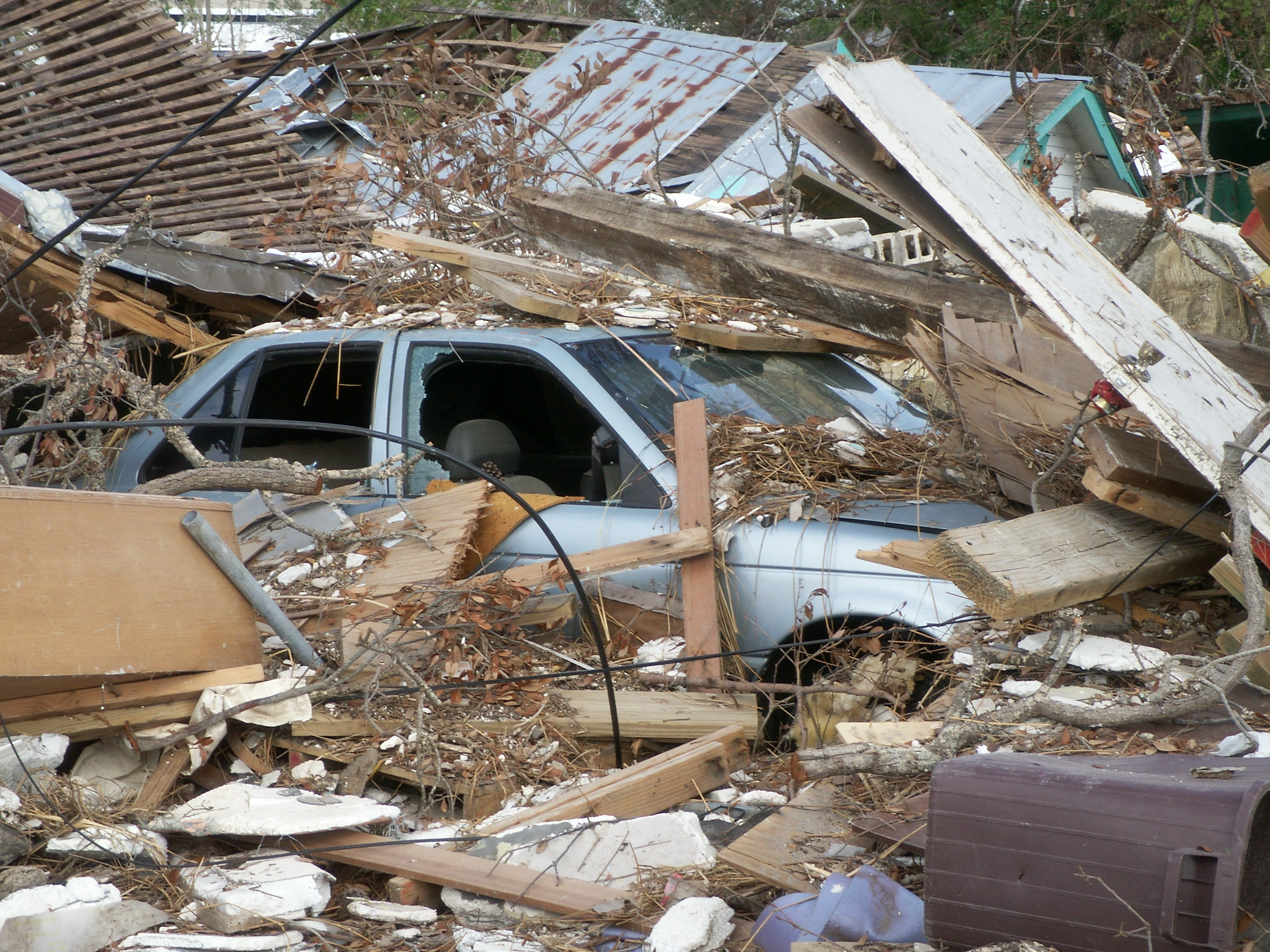
Destroyed buildings and cars after Hurricane Katrina, Biloxi

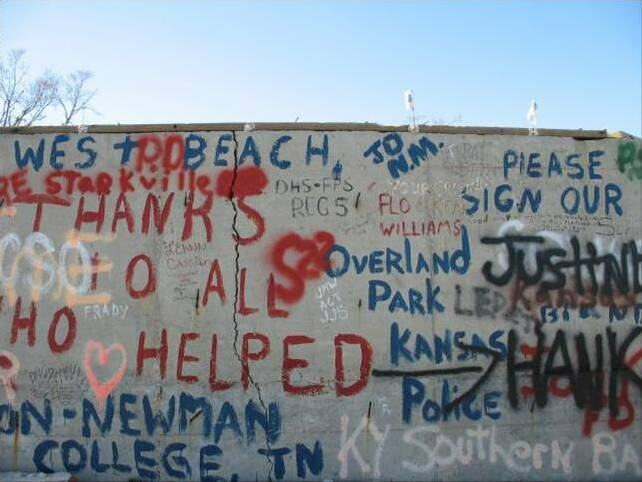
Sign commemorating first responders after Hurricane Katrina, Gulfport

According to the EPA, "tropical storms and hurricanes have become more intense during the past 20 years. Although warming oceans provide these storms with more potential energy, scientists are not sure whether the recent intensification reflects a long-term trend. Nevertheless, hurricane wind speeds and rainfall rates are likely to increase as the climate continues to warm".

The EPA further reports that "whether or not storms become more intense, coastal homes and infrastructure will flood more often as sea level rises, because storm surges will become higher as well. Rising sea level is likely to increase flood insurance rates, while more frequent storms could increase the deductible for wind damage in homeowner insurance policies. Many cities, roads, railways, ports, airports, and oil and gas facilities along the Gulf Coast are vulnerable to the combined impacts of storms and sea level rise. People may move from vulnerable coastal communities and stress the infrastructure of the communities that receive them".

== Flooding and river transportation ==
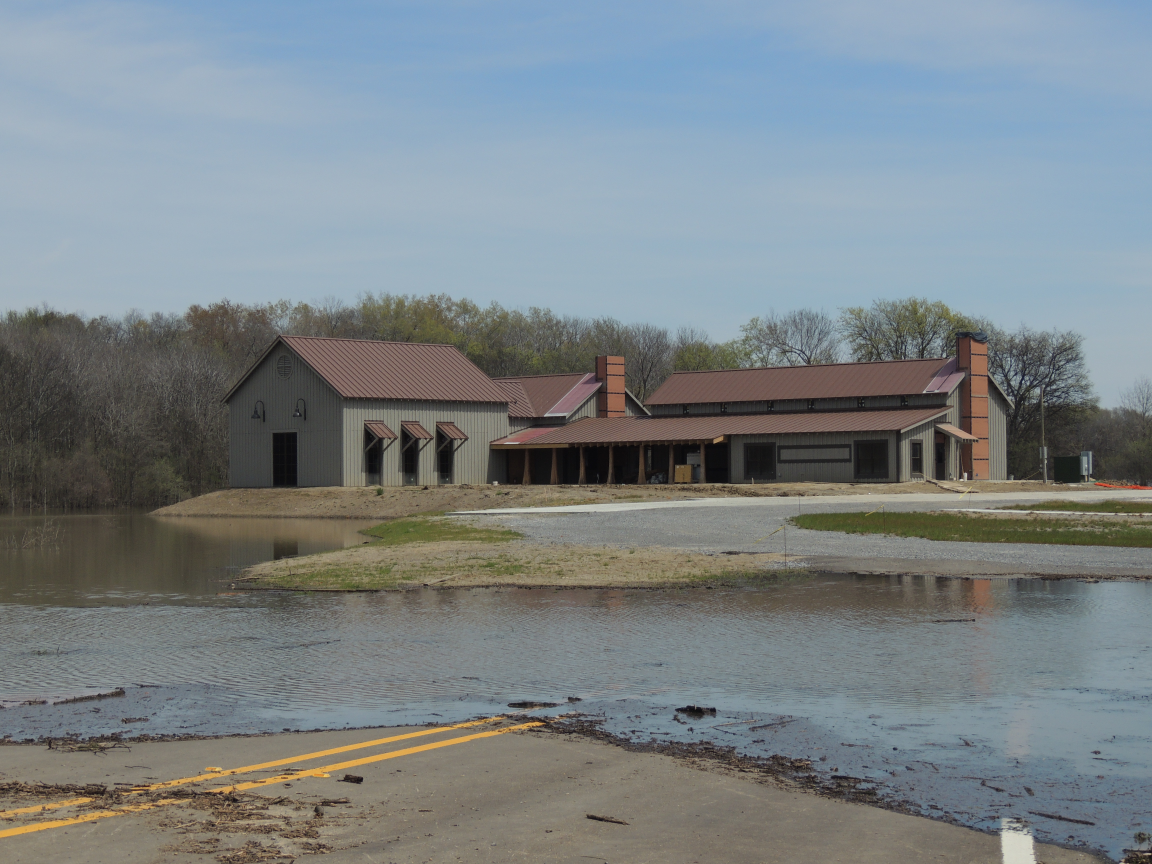
Flooded road, Onward, 2019

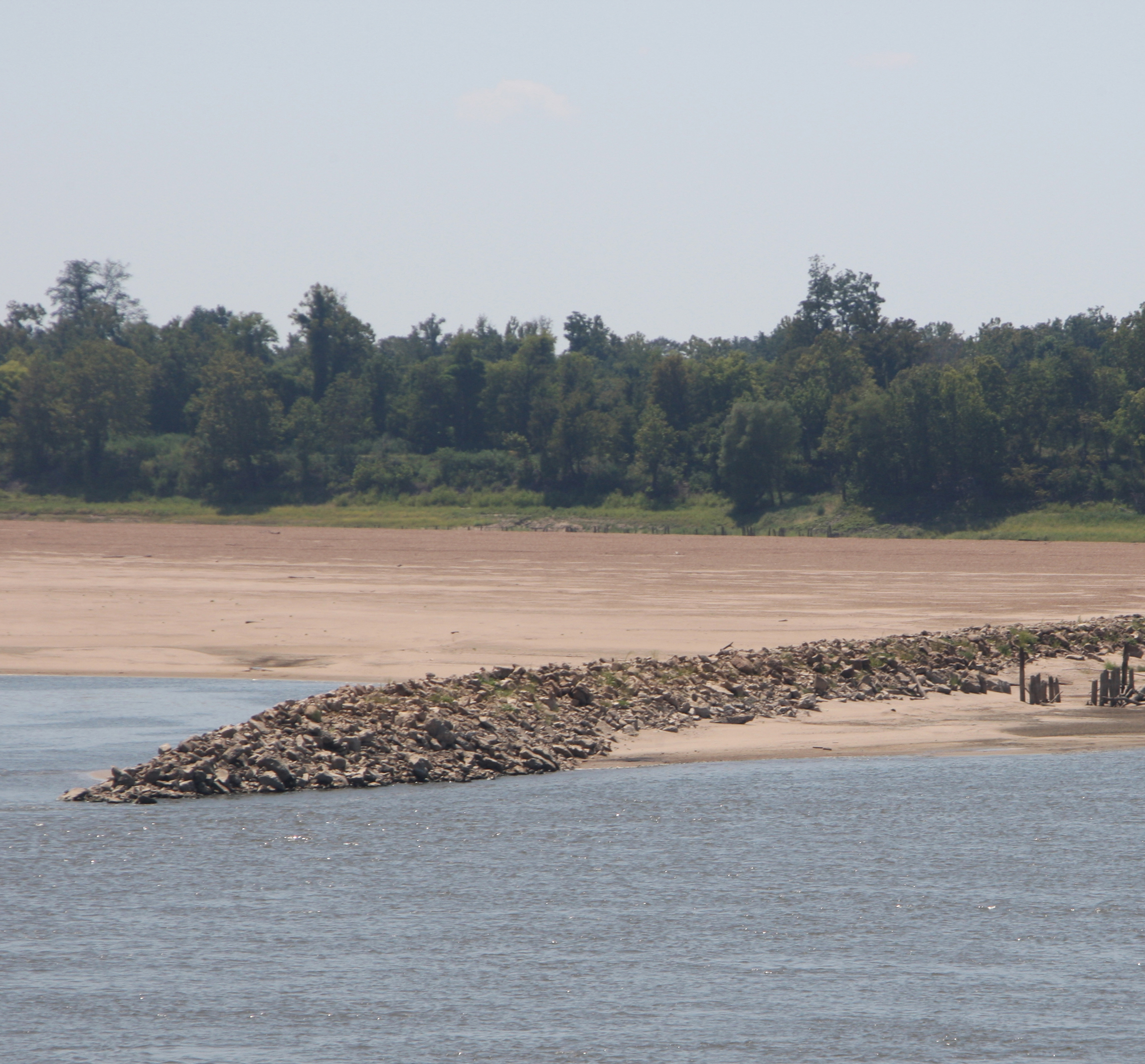
Drought exposing shoals, Mississippi River near Vicksburg, 2012

According to the EPA, "changing the climate is also likely to increase inland flooding. Vicksburg and Natchez are vulnerable to high water levels on the Mississippi River. Since 1958, the amount of precipitation during heavy rainstorms has increased by 27 percent in the Southeast, and the trend toward increasingly heavy rainstorms is likely to continue. Moreover, streamflows in the Midwest are increasing, and the amount of rainfall there is also likely to increase, which could increase flooding in Mississippi, because most of the Midwest drains into the Mississippi River. Droughts create a different set of challenges. During severe droughts in the Mississippi River’s watershed, low flows can restrict commercial navigation. For example, low water in 2012 forced the U.S. Army Corps of Engineers to reduce allowable barge sizes on the Mississippi River and close the river at Greenville for more than a week, which delayed approximately 100 barges".

== Agriculture ==
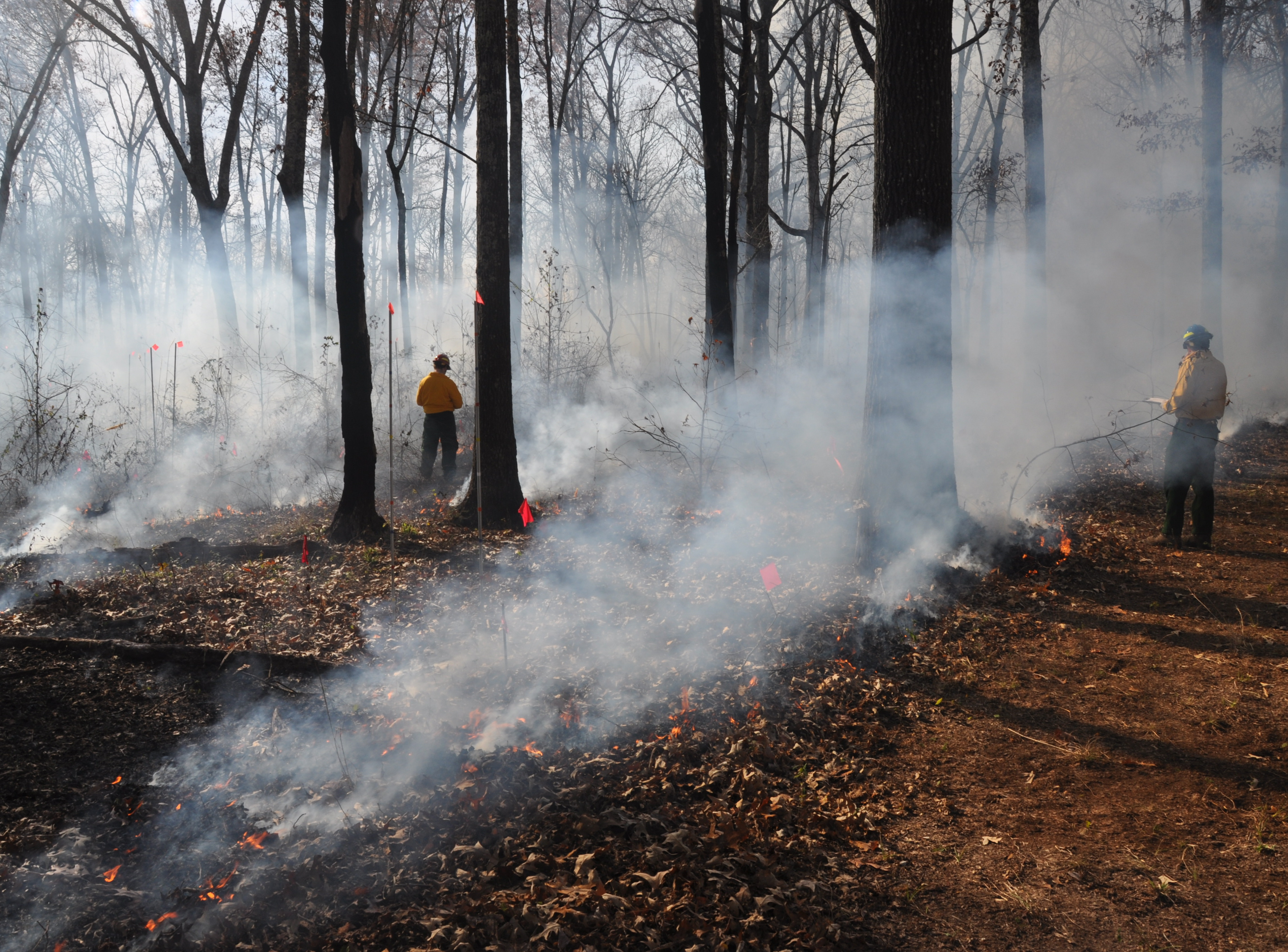
Wildfire research, Strawberry Plains Audubon Center, Holly Springs

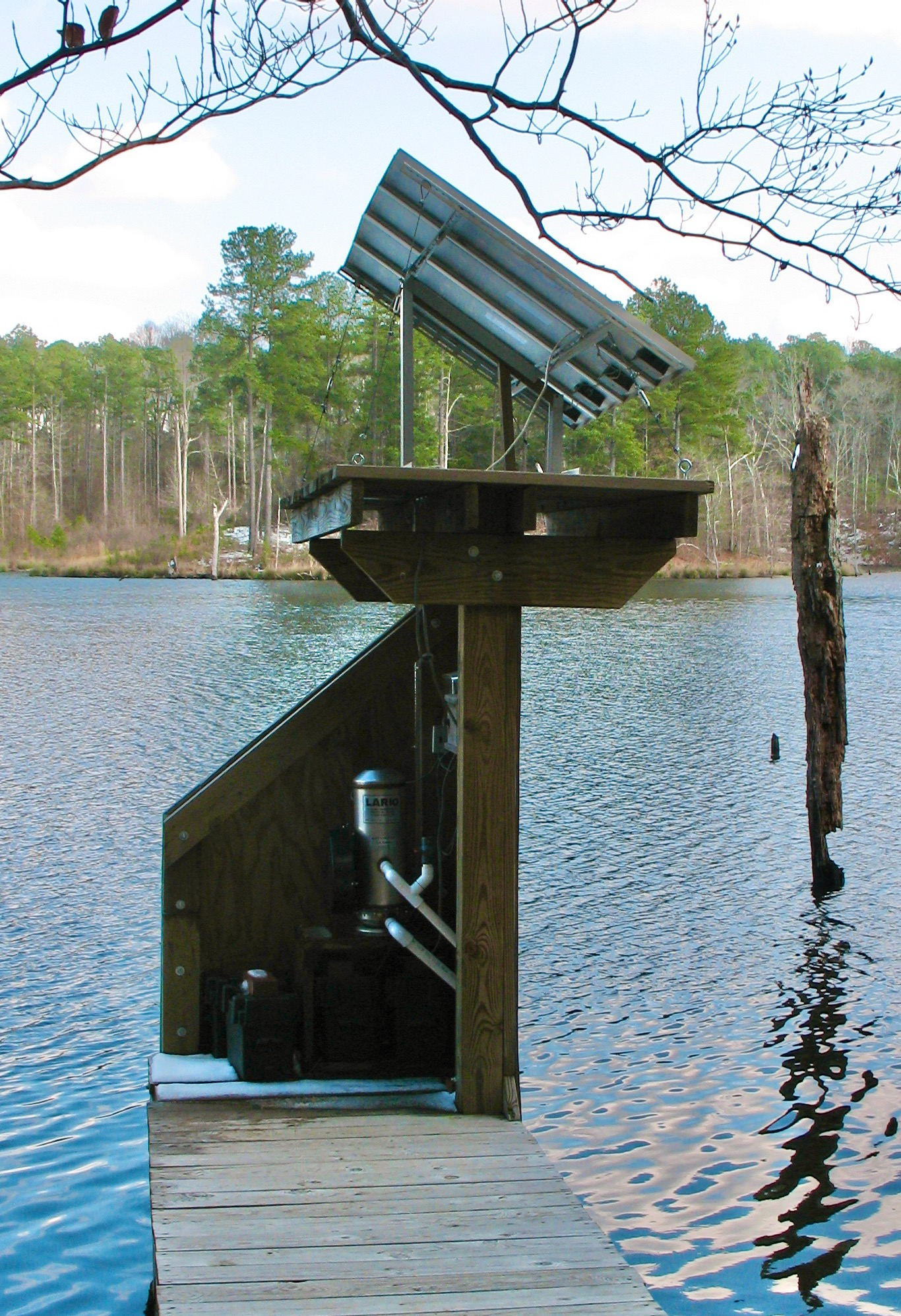
Solar-powered pump, Oxford

According to the EPA, "changing the climate will have both harmful and beneficial effects on farming. Seventy years from now, Mississippi is likely to have 30 to 60 days per year with temperatures above 95°F, compared with about 15 days today. Even during the next few decades, hotter summers are likely to reduce yields of corn. But higher concentrations of atmospheric carbon dioxide increase crop yields, and that fertilizing effect is likely to offset the harmful effects of heat on soybeans, cotton, wheat, and peanuts—if enough water is available. More severe droughts, however, could cause crop failures. Higher temperatures are also likely to reduce livestock productivity, because heat stress disrupts the animals' metabolism".

== Forest resources ==
According to the EPA, "higher temperatures and changes in rainfall are unlikely to substantially reduce forest cover in Mississippi, although the composition of trees in the forests may change. More droughts would reduce forest productivity, and climate change is also likely to increase the damage from insects and disease. But longer growing seasons and higher carbon dioxide concentrations could more than offset the losses from those factors. Forests cover almost two-thirds of the state. Oak, hickory, and white pine trees are most common in the northern part of the state, except along the Mississippi River Delta. In the southern part of the state, loblolly and longleaf pines are most common. As the climate warms, forests in southern Mississippi are likely to have more oaks and white pines, and fewer loblolly and longleaf pines".

== See also ==
- Plug-in electric vehicles in Mississippi
