= Twin Creeks Technologies =

Twin Creeks Technologies was a California-based American technology company that claimed to develop cheaper manufacturing equipment for the production of solar modules, sensors, LEDs and other solid-state devices. It had 76 employees in a pilot production plant in Mississippi and approximately 30 employees at a development site in San Jose, California. The company raised $93 million, including $27.7 million provided by Mississippi taxpayers. Twin Creeks Technology folded in mid-November 2012 selling assets to GT Advanced Technologies of Nashua, New Hampshire. The new owners of the assets had no intention of continuing the Mississippi manufacturing operation.

== Dealings with the state of Mississippi ==
An agreement with the state of Mississippi was for them to provide a loan to Twin Creeks Technologies of up to $50 million, where Twin Creeks Technologies would pay no interest for twenty years, in exchange for which the company planned to hire 500 people to work at their manufacturing facility in Senatobia, Mississippi or to invest $132 million, as well as the requirement that they be in commercial production by December 31.

The state of Mississippi has filed an unsuccessful lawsuit to block the company from a $10 million sale of its patents to GT Advanced Technologies, Inc. Silicon Valley Bank received $7 million from that sale, which the state also tried unsuccessfully to block.

The state is seeking $23.7 million in addition to alleged fraud and punitive damages.

== Notable inventions ==
Twin Creeks Technologies invented an ion cannon they called Hyperion, which is capable of slicing crystalline silicon layers 20 micrometers thick, instead of the usual 200-micrometer-thick solar cells most produced. This is predicted to be able to produce solar cells for less than half the cost. CEO Siva Sivaram has stated that the company can now produce solar cells for about 40 cents per watt, which is half the cost of the cheapest solar cells available by others.

=== U.S. Patents ===
Twin Creeks Technologies, Inc. was issued 32 U.S. Patents for their technology. As of September 2nd, 2024, Twin Creeks Technology, Inc has had 105 patents assigned to them. (How many are still valid is unknown).
