= University Press of Mississippi =

Academic publisher

- Parent company: Mississippi Institutions of Higher Learning
- Founded: 1970
- Headquarters location: Jackson, Mississippi
- Distribution: self-distributed (US); Eurospan Group (EMEA, Asia, Latin America); UBC Press (Canada)
- Publication types: Books
- Official website: www.upress.state.ms.us

The University Press of Mississippi (UPM), founded in 1970, is a university press that is sponsored by the eight state universities in Mississippi (i.e., Alcorn State University, Delta State University, Jackson State University, Mississippi State University, Mississippi University for Women, Mississippi Valley State University, University of Mississippi, and the University of Southern Mississippi), making it one of the few university presses in the United States to have more than one affiliate university.

A member of the Association of University Presses since 1976, the University Press of Mississippi issues around 85 new books each year, and as of 2022, it has published over 2000 titles. The press is best known for its works pertaining to African American history, children's literature, pop culture media (e.g., film, television, and comic books), and regional studies.

== Publications ==
Major book series published by the University Press of Mississippi include:

- American Made Music
- America’s Third Coast
- Atlantic Migrations and the African Diaspora
- Banner Books
- Caribbean Studies
- Chancellor Porter L. Fortune Symposium in Southern History
- Children’s Literature Association
- Civil Rights in Mississippi
- Conversations monograph series
- Critical Approaches to Comics Artists
- Critical Perspectives on Eudora Welty
- Cultures of Childhood
- Faulkner and Yoknapatawpha
- Folklore Studies in a Multicultural World
- Great Comic Artists
- Heritage of Mississippi
- Hollywood Legends
- Horror and Monstrosity Studies Series
- Margaret Walker Alexander Series in African American Studies
- Race, Rhetoric, and Media
- Reframing Hollywood
- University of Mississippi Museum and Historic Houses
- Willie Morris Books in Memoir and Biography

== See also ==
- List of English-language book publishing companies
- List of university presses
