= Plug-in electric vehicles in Mississippi =

As of 2022, there were 780 electric vehicles registered in Mississippi, equivalent to 0.04% of all vehicles in the state.

In 2022, Mississippi was ranked by LendingTree as the worst state in the United States for electric vehicle ownership.

== Government policy ==
As of 2022, the state government does not offer any tax incentives for electric vehicle purchases.

In 2018, the state government introduced an annual $150 registration fee for electric vehicles, and a $75 fee for plug-in hybrid vehicles.

== Charging stations ==
As of September 2022, there were 301 public charging station ports in Mississippi.

The Infrastructure Investment and Jobs Act, signed into law in November 2021, allocates US$50 million to charging stations in Mississippi.

As of September 2022, Mississippi has the lowest number of DC charging stations per capita (age 16 and older) in the United States.

== By region ==
=== Jackson ===
In 2021, the Jackson metropolitan area was ranked by The New York Times as the worst metropolitan area in the United States (out of the 100 most populous) for electric vehicle ownership.
