= Vietnamese in Mississippi =

Mississippi has a Vietnamese American population. As of 2010 7,025 ethnic Vietnamese live in Mississippi, making up 0.2% of the people there.

== History ==
Vietnamese came to the United States as a result of the Vietnam War, with many coming beginning 1975. Many Vietnamese fisherpeople who fled from the war settled in areas where they could resume their fishing activities, including the Mississippi Gulf Coast. The Biloxi community needed employees for oyster factories, so many Vietnamese began working there. The seafood jobs did not require a significant fluency in English, attracting the immigrants.

The ethnic Vietnamese population grew over 100% between 1980 and 1990. The state had 5,387 ethnic Vietnamese by 2000.

In 2005 Hurricane Katrina affected Vietnamese communities along the Gulf of Mexico.

The Vietnamese statewide population was 7,025 as of 2010.

The Vietnamese living along the Gulf of Mexico were affected by the Deepwater Horizon oil spill in 2010.

== Geography ==
As of 2010 the largest group of Vietnamese live along the Gulf of Mexico in Hancock, Harrison, and Jackson counties. As of 2010 the Gulfport-Biloxi area has about 5,000 Vietnamese Americans. As of the same year over 50% of the state's Vietnamese reside in Harrison County. In 2005, prior to Hurricane Katrina, about 2,500 Vietnamese lived in East Biloxi, where there was a single community with Vietnamese businesses, a Buddhist temple, and a Vietnamese Catholic church. Most of the Vietnamese there lived in low-lying areas. The community sustained damages during Katrina. Some Vietnamese had relocated to D'Iberville.

As of 2010 the Jackson metropolitan area has the second largest Vietnamese population in the state and the Hattiesburg, Mississippi area has the state's third largest Vietnamese population. Jamie Bounds of the Mississippi Department of Archives and History wrote that "The counties bordering the Mississippi River, particularly those in the northwest section of the state, have a measurable Vietnamese population."

== Organizations ==
The Mississippi Coalition of Vietnamese American Fisherfolk and Families serves area fisherpeople.
