= Battle of Camp Davies =

American Civil War on November 22, 1863

Coordinates: 34.937222°N 88.515278°W

- Part of the American Civil War
Date	November 22, 1863
Location	Corinth, Mississippi
Result	Union victory

Belligerents
United States (Union)	(Confederate States of America) CSA (Confederacy)

Commanders and leaders
Francis L. Cramer	Thomas W. Ham

Units involved
1st Regiment Alabama Cavalry (Union)	16th Battalion, Mississippi Cavalry State Troops

Strength
70	150

Casualties and losses
2 wounded	4 known KIA

The Battle of Camp Davies was a skirmish during the American Civil War on November 22, 1863, near a Union Army camp about six miles south of Corinth, Mississippi. A 70-man detachment of the 1st Regiment Alabama Cavalry (Union), commanded by Major Francis L. Cramer, drove off a 150-man Confederate force of the 16th Battalion, Mississippi Cavalry State Troops (sometimes referred to as 1st Battalion or simply as Ham's Battalion of Cavalry), commanded by Major Thomas W. Ham, and killed at least 4 Confederate soldiers, while suffering two severely wounded troopers. This action is the only engagement recorded as occurring at or near Camp Davies in major sources on American Civil War battles. Other similar engagements in the vicinity of Corinth in 1863 may have occurred near Camp Davies.

== Background ==
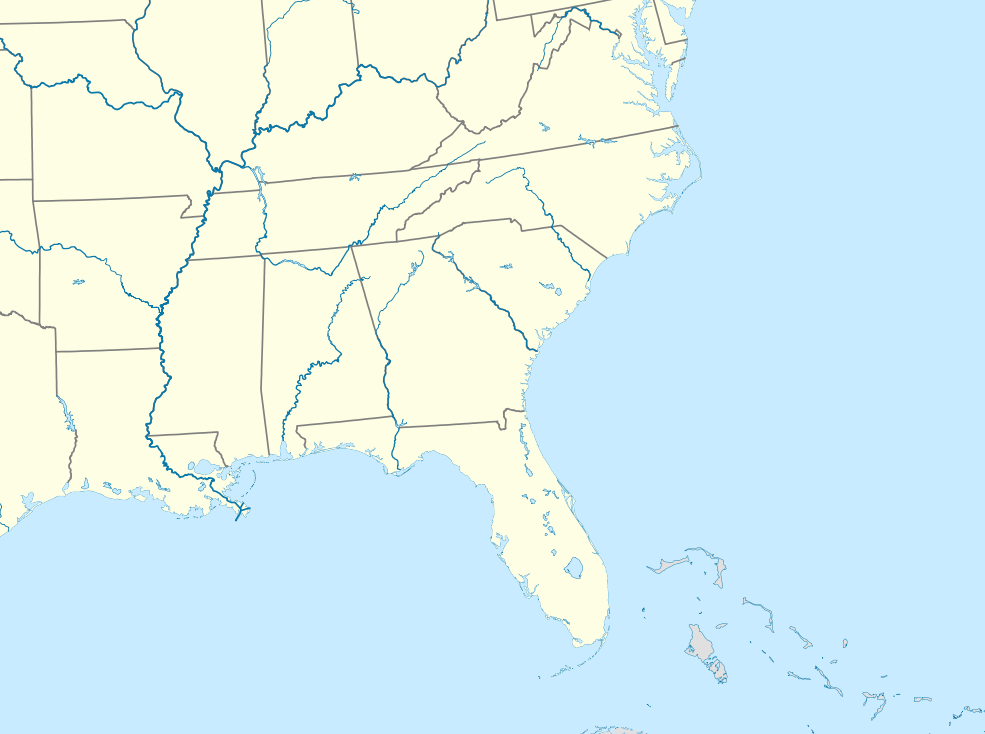
Western Theater

On May 30, 1862, Confederate General Pierre G. T. Beauregard abandoned the railroad center of Corinth, Mississippi to Union Army forces commanded by Major General Henry W. Halleck at the conclusion of the Siege of Corinth. Halleck began building defenses around Corinth. In order to defend the town and observe movement of Confederate troops and guerillas, and to secure fresh water supplies for the soldiers, the Union Army built camps around Corinth in strategic locations.

In November, 1862, the 14th Missouri Volunteer Infantry Regiment, (Note: Then Birge's Western Sharpshooters, later re-designated the 66th Illinois Infantry Regiment) established a base six miles south of Corinth, along the lower reaches of Clear Creek, near its junction with the Tuscumbia River. They named it Camp Davies, in honor of their former division commander, Brigadier General Thomas Alfred Davies. Eventually enclosed by a wooden stockade, it contained forty buildings within the walls.

== Battle ==
=== Corinth area military engagements in 1863 ===
From November 1862 to January 1864, Historian E. B. Long recorded skirmishes in the Corinth area on June 11, 1863, August 16, 1863, November 2, 1863, November 12, 1863, and December 23, 1863. Long cites Frederick Dyer's A Compendium of the War of Rebellion (1908) as one of the sources in preparing his work, The Civil War Day by Day (1971).

The November 22, 1863, engagement in the Corinth area was recorded by Frederick Dyer in 1908 and E. B. Long in 1971 as a skirmish at Camp Davies.

=== Skirmish at Camp Davies ===
A brief report on the Skirmish at Camp Davies, Mississippi on November 22, 1863, by Union Army Brigadier General John D. Stevenson is shown at page 573 of Series 1, volume 31, Part 1 of The War of the Rebellion: a Compilation of the Official Records of the Union and Confederate Armies. General Stevenson reported from Corinth, Mississippi, November 22, 1863, on the skirmish of a detachment of the 1st Regiment Alabama Cavalry (Union) with a Confederate force as follows:

A force of enemy, 150 strong, under Ham, appearing on Ripley road, 5 miles from Camp Davies, were attacked by Major Cramer, First Alabama Cavalry, with 70 men, and after a sharp fight were driven in confusion in direction of Rienzi. Enemy's loss, 4 known to be killed. Our loss, 2 severely wounded.

== Aftermath ==
Following the skirmishes of 1863 various regiments used Camp Davies, until abandoned and destroyed on January 24, 1864. The garrisons had to be watchful for Confederate raiders, scouts and guerrillas who appeared in the area intermittently.

The Confederate officer "Ham" referred to in the report would have been Major Thomas Wiley Ham, then major commanding 16th Battalion, Mississippi Cavalry State Troops (sometimes referred to as 1st Battalion or simply as Ham's Battalion of Cavalry). The battalion was transferred to Confederate service on May 4, 1864, and consolidated with other companies to form Ham's Cavalry Regiment with Thomas W. Ham as colonel. The regiment is shown in the Mississippi State record of commissions as the Seventh Regiment Cavalry but surviving Confederate organization records do not show it with that title Colonel Ham was mortally wounded in fighting at the Battle of Ezra Church, west of Atlanta on July 28, 1864, and died on July 30, 1864.

Major Francis L. Cramer of the 1st Regiment Alabama Cavalry (Union) was first lieutenant and adjutant of the 1st Regiment Nebraska Volunteer Cavalry when he was discharged for promotion to major in the 1st Alabama Cavalry Regiment (Union) on October 24, 1863. The 1st Regiment Nebraska Volunteer Infantry had been re-designated 1st Regiment Nebraska Volunteer Cavalry on October 11, 1863. Cramer was wounded and captured during the Carolinas campaign at the Battle of Monroe's Crossroads on May 10, 1865. After the battle Cramer was paroled due to his wounds. On April 3, 1867, President Andrew Johnson nominated Cramer for appointment to the grade of brevet brigadier general, to rank from March 13, 1865, and the United States Senate confirmed the appointment on April 8, 1867.

== Sources ==
- Camp Davies, National Park Service. Retrieved March 27, 2020.
- Mississippi: Ham's Cavalry Regiment, The American Civil War web site. Retrieved March 29, 2020.
- Allardice, Bruce S. Confederate Colonels: A Biographical Register. Columbia: University of Missouri Press, 2008. ISBN 978-0-8262-1809-4.
- Ballard, Michael B. The Civil War in Mississippi: Major Campaigns and Battles. Jackson, Mississippi: University of Mississippi Press, 2011. ISBN 978-1-62846-170-1.
- Dyer, Frederick H. A Compendium of the War of Rebellion: Compiled and Arranged From Official Records of the Federal and Confederate Armies, Reports of the Adjutant Generals of the Several States, The Army Registers and Other Reliable Documents and Sources. Dayton, Ohio: Morningside Books, 1978. ISBN 978-0-89029-046-0. First published 1908 by Dyer Publishing.
- Eicher, John H., and David J. Eicher, Civil War High Commands. Stanford: Stanford University Press, 2001. ISBN 978-0-8047-3641-1.
- Long, E. B. The Civil War Day by Day: An Almanac, 1861–1865. Garden City, New York: Doubleday, 1971. OCLC 68283123.
- United States War Department. The War of the Rebellion: A Compilation of the Official Records of the Union and Confederate Armies. Washington, D.C.: U.S. Government Printing Office, 1880–1901. OCLC 427057. Series 1, volume 31, Part 1 (1890).
- United States War Department. The War of the Rebellion: A Compilation of the Official Records of the Union and Confederate Armies. Washington, D.C.: U.S. Government Printing Office, 1880–1901. OCLC 427057. Series 1, vol. XLVII (47), Part 1. (1895) Report of Major Sanford Tramel, First Alabama Cavalry of operations January 28-March 24. March 28, 1865.
