= Skirmish at Abbeville =

Battle of the American Civil War

- Part of the American Civil War
Date	August 23, 1864
Location	Lafayette County, Mississippi
Result	Union victory

Belligerents
United States	(Confederate States of America) Confederate States

Commanders and leaders
Joseph A. Mower	Abraham Buford II

Strength
2,000	Unknown

Casualties and losses
1 killed, 17 wounded,	16 killed

The Skirmish at Abbeville was a battle fought between the Union Army and the Confederate Army in Lafayette County, Mississippi in August 23, 1864. The battle resulted in a Union victory.
