= Mississippi Book Festival =

The Mississippi Book Festival is an annual book festival in Jackson, Mississippi, U.S.. It has been held outside the Mississippi State Capitol every year since 2015. In 2017, Congressman Gregg Harper and author Richard Ford were in attendance.
