= List of colleges and universities in Mississippi =

There are numerous colleges and universities in the U.S state of Mississippi including public universities, community colleges, private colleges, and specialized institutions. The state's public universities are governed by the Mississippi Institutions of Higher Learning (IHL), while its community colleges are organized separately through the Mississippi Community College Board. There are 8 public universities and 15 community colleges in Mississippi. There are also six historically Black colleges and universities (HBCUs) in Mississippi.

The University of Mississippi in Oxford is the largest university in the state with 28,960 students enrolled for fall 2026 including the 3,270 students from University of Mississippi Medical Center. Hinds Community College in Raymond, Mississippi is the largest two-year college with a full time enrollment of 7,202 in the fall of 2023. The smallest institution is Southeastern Baptist College with approximately 100 students enrolled for the fall 2026.

Mississippi has two medical schools: the University of Mississippi School of Medicine, located at the University of Mississippi Medical Center in Jackson, and the William Carey University College of Osteopathic Medicine in Hattiesburg. The University of Mississippi School of Law in Oxford and the Mississippi Christian University School of Law in Jackson are the state's two American Bar Association accredited law schools.

The oldest institution is Mississippi Christian University in Clinton founded in 1826.

== Institutions ==
| Institution | Location | Type | Enrollment | Founded | Classification |
|---|---|---|---|---|---|
| Alcorn State University | Lorman | Public | 2,995 | 1871 | Research University |
| Belhaven University | Jackson | Private | 4,213 | 1883 | Doctoral university |
| Blue Cliff College | Gulfport | Private | 200 | 1987 | Unclassified |
| Blue Mountain Christian University | Blue Mountain | Private | 968 | 1873 | Baccalaureate college |
| Coahoma Community College | Clarksdale | Public | 1,633 | 1949 | Community college |
| Copiah–Lincoln Community College | Wesson | Public | 2,932 | 1928 | Community college |
| Delta State University | Cleveland | Public | 2,654 | 1924 | Master's university |
| East Central Community College | Decatur | Public | 2,785 | 1928 | Community college |
| East Mississippi Community College | Scooba | Public | 3,841 | 1927 | Community college |
| Hinds Community College | Raymond | Public | 8,859 | 1917 | Community college |
| Holmes Community College | Goodman | Public | 5,039 | 1911 | Community college |
| Itawamba Community College | Fulton | Public | 5,139 | 1948 | Community college |
| Jackson State University | Jackson | Public | 6,326 | 1877 | Research university |
| Jones College | Ellisville | Public | 4,753 | 1911 | Community college |
| Meridian Community College | Meridian | Public | 2,780 | 1937 | Community college |
| Millsaps College | Jackson | Private | 593 | 1890 | Baccalaureate college |
| Mississippi Christian University | Clinton | Private | 4,164 | 1826 | Doctoral university |
| Mississippi Delta Community College | Moorhead | Public | 1,978 | 1927 | Community college |
| Mississippi Gulf Coast Community College | Perkinston | Public | 8,694 | 1912 | Community college |
| Mississippi State University | Starkville | Public | 23,150 | 1878 | Research university |
| Mississippi University for Women | Columbus | Public | 2,193 | 1884 | Master's university |
| Mississippi Valley State University | Itta Bena | Public | 2,205 | 1950 | Master's university |
| Northeast Mississippi Community College | Booneville | Public | 3,442 | 1948 | Community college |
| Northwest Mississippi Community College | Senatobia | Public | 7,867 | 1927 | Community college |
| Pearl River Community College | Poplarville | Public | 6,011 | 1921 | Community college |
| Rust College | Holly Springs | Private | 467 | 1866 | Baccalaureate college |
| Southeastern Baptist College | Laurel | Private | 93 | 1948 | Faith-related institution |
| Southwest Mississippi Community College | Summit | Public | 1,758 | 1908 | Community college |
| Tougaloo College | Tougaloo | Private | 1,301 | 1869 | Baccalaureate college |
| University of Mississippi | Oxford | Public | 26,449 | 1848 | Research university |
| University of Southern Mississippi | Hattiesburg | Public | 13,170 | 1910 | Research university |
| Wesley Biblical Seminary | Ridgeland | Private | 170 | 1974 | Faith-related institution |
| William Carey University | Hattiesburg | Private | 5,321 | 1892 | Doctoral university |

== See also ==
- List of college athletic programs in Mississippi
- Higher education in the United States
- Lists of American institutions of higher education
- List of recognized higher education accreditation organizations
- Lists of universities and colleges
- Lists of universities and colleges by country
