= List of law enforcement agencies in Mississippi =

This is a list of law enforcement agencies in the state of Mississippi.

According to the US Bureau of Justice Statistics' 2008 Census of State and Local Law Enforcement Agencies, the state had 342 law enforcement agencies employing 7,707 sworn police officers, about 262 for each 100,000 residents. Per the state constitution, all "civil officers" of the state, including those in the legislative and judicial branches, can exercise the power of arrest, though this is rarely exercised by said officials.

== Multi-County agencies ==
- Metro Narcotics Unit (Oxford and Layfette Counties and the University of Mississippi)

== State agencies ==
- Mississippi Attorney General's Office
- Mississippi Bureau of Investigation
- Mississippi Bureau of Narcotics
- Mississippi Capitol Police
- Mississippi Department of Corrections
- Mississippi Department of Mental Health
  - Mississippi State Hospital Police
  - East Mississippi State Hospital Police
  - North Mississippi State Hospital Police
  - South Mississippi State Hospital Police
- Mississippi Department of Revenue
  - Criminal Investigations Division
  - Alcoholic Beverage Control
- Mississippi Department of Wildlife, Fisheries and Parks
  - Law Enforcement Division
- Mississippi Department of Marine Resources
  - Mississippi Marine Patrol
- Mississippi Highway Patrol
- Mississippi Department of Transportation Office of Law Enforcement
- Mississippi Reservoir Police
- Mississippi Gaming Commission
- Mississippi Agricultural & Livestock Theft Bureau
- Mississippi Department of Human Services | Office of Inspector General | Bureau of Investigation

== School district agencies ==
- North Bolivar Consolidated Schools School Safety
- Hazlehurst City School District Safety and Security Department
- Hattiesburg Public Schools Police Department
- Petal School Police Department
- Biloxi School District Police Department
- Jackson Public Schools Campus Enforcement Department
- Ocean Springs School District Police Department
- Meridian Public School District Police Department
- North Panola School District Bullying/School Safety Department
- Pearl River County School District Police Department
- Greenville Public School District Campus Safety Department
- Leland School District Police Department
- George County School District Police Department
- Lawrence County School District Police Department
- Tishomingo County School District Police Department
- Vicksburg-Warren School District Campus Police Department
- Lincoln County School District Police Department
- Marshall County Schools Police Department
- East Tallahatchie School District Police Department

== County agencies ==
- Adams County Sheriff's Office Official website
- Alcorn County Sheriff's Office
- Amite County Sheriff's Office Official website
- Attala County Sheriff's Office Official website
- Benton County Sheriff's Office
- Bolivar County Sheriff's Office
- Calhoun County Sheriff's Office Official website
- Carroll County Sheriff's Office
- Chickasaw County Sheriff's Office
- Choctaw County Sheriff's Office
- Claiborne County Sheriff's Office
- Clarke County Sheriff's Office
- Clay County Sheriff's Office
- Coahoma County Sheriff's Office
- Copiah County Sheriff's Office
- Covington County Sheriff's Office
- De Soto County Sheriff's Office
- Forrest County Sheriff's Office
- Franklin County Sheriff's Office
- George County Sheriff's Office
- Greene County Sheriff's Office
- Grenada County Sheriff's Office
- Hancock County Sheriff's Office
- Harrison County Sheriff's Department
- Hinds County Sheriff's Office
- Holmes County Sheriff's Office
- Humphreys County Sheriff's Office
- Issaquena County Sheriff's Office
- Itawamba County Sheriff's Office
- Jackson County Sheriff's Office
- Jasper County Sheriff's Office
- Jefferson County Sheriff's Office
- Jefferson Davis County Sheriff's Office
- Jones County Sheriff's Office
- Kemper County Sheriff's Office
- Lafayette County Sheriff's Office
- Lamar County Sheriff's Office
- Lauderdale County Sheriff's Office
- Lawrence County Sheriff's Office
- Leake County Sheriff's Office
- Lee County Sheriff's Office
- Leflore County Sheriff's Office
- Lincoln County Sheriff's Office
- Lowndes County Sheriff's Office
- Madison County Sheriff's Office
- Marion County Sheriff's Office
- Marshall County Sheriff's Office
- Monroe County Sheriff's Office
- Montgomery County Sheriff's Office
- Neshoba County Sheriff's Office
- Newton County Sheriff's Office
- Noxubee County Sheriff's Office
- Oktibbeha County Sheriff's Office
- Panola County Sheriff's Office
- Pearl River County Sheriff's Office
- Perry County Sheriff's Office
- Pike County Sheriff's Office
- Pontotoc County Sheriff's Office
- Prentiss County Sheriff's Office
- Quitman County Sheriff's Office
- Rankin County Sheriff's Department
- Scott County Sheriff's Office
- Sharkey County Sheriff's Office
- Simpson County Sheriff's Office
- Smith County Sheriff's Office
- Stone County Sheriff's Office
- Sunflower County Sheriff's Office
- Tallahatchie County Sheriff's Office
- Tate County Sheriff's Office
- Tippah County Sheriff's Office
- Tishomingo County Sheriff's Office
- Tunica County Sheriff's Office
- Union County Sheriff's Office
- Walthall County Sheriff's Office
- Warren County Sheriff's Office
- Washington County Sheriff's Office
- Wayne County Sheriff's Office
- Webster County Sheriff's Office
- Wilkinson County Sheriff's Office
- Winston County Sheriff's Office
- Yalobusha County Sheriff's Office
- Yazoo County Sheriff's Office

== City agencies ==
- Aberdeen Police Department
- Ackerman Police Department
- Algoma Police Department
- Amory Police Department
- Ashland Police Department
- Baldwyn Police Department
- Bassfield Police Department
- Batesville Police Department
- Bay Saint Louis Police Department
- Bay Springs Police Department
- Belmont Police Department
- Belzoni Police Department
- Biloxi Police Department
- Booneville Police Department
- Brandon Police Department
- Brookhaven Police Department
- Bruce Police Department
- Bude Police Department
- Burnsville Police Department
- Byhalia Police Department
- Byram Police Department
- Calhoun City Police Department
- Canton Police Department
- Carthage Police Department
- Centreville Police Department
- Charleston Police Department
- Clarksdale Police Department
- Cleveland Police Department
- Clinton Police Department
- Coffeeville Police Department
- Coldwater Police Department
- Collins Police Department
- Columbia Police Department
- Columbus Police Department
- Como Police Department
- Corinth Police Department
- Crenshaw Police Department
- Crystal Springs Police Department
- Decatur Police Department
- Dekalb Police Department
- Drew Police Department
- Durant Police Department
- Edwards Police Department
- Ellisville Police Department
- Eupora Police Department
- Fayette Police Department
- Flora Police Department
- Florence Police Department
- Flowood Police Department
- Forest Police Department
- Friars Point Police Department
- Fulton Police Department
- Gautier Police Department
- Gloster Police Department
- Golden Police Department
- Goodman Police Department
- Greenville Police Department
- Greenwood Police Department
- Grenada Police Department
- Gulfport Police Department
- Guntown Police Department
- Hattiesburg Police Department
- Hazlehurst Police Department
- Heidelberg Police Department
- Hernando Police Department
- Hollandale Police Department
- Holly Springs Police Department
- Horn Lake Police Department
- Houston Police Department
- Indianola Police Department
- Inverness Police Department
- Itta Bena Police Department
- Iuka Police Department
- Jackson Police Department
- Jonestown Police Department
- Kilmichael Police Department
- Kosciusko Police Department
- Laurel Police Department
- Leakesville Police Department
- Leland Police Department
- Lena Police Department
- Lexington Police Department
- Liberty Police Department
- Long Beach Police Department
- Louisville Police Department
- Lucedale Police Department
- Lumberton Police Department
- Macon Police Department
- Madison Police Department
- Magee Police Department
- Magnolia Police Department
- Marion Police Department
- Marks Police Department
- McComb Police Department
- Mendenhall Police Department
- Meridian Police Department
- Monticello Police Department
- Moorhead Police Department
- Morton Police Department
- Moss Point Police Department
- Mound Bayou Police Department
- Mount Olive Police Department
- Natchez Police Department
- Nettleton Police Department
- New Albany Police Department
- Newton Police Department
- Oakland Police Department
- Ocean Springs Police Department
- Okolona Police Department
- Olive Branch Police Department
- Oxford Police Department
- Pascagoula Police Department
- Pass Christian Police Department
- Pearl Police Department
- Pelahatchie Police Department
- Petal Police Department
- Philadelphia Police Department
- Picayune Police Department
- Pickens Police Department
- Pine Belt Police Department
- Pontotoc Police Department
- Poplarville Police Department
- Port Gibson Police Department
- Prentiss Police Department
- Purvis Police Department
- Quitman Police Department
- Raleigh Police Department
- Raymond Police Department
- Richland Police Department
- Richton Police Department
- Ridgeland Police Department
- Ripley Police Department
- Rolling Fork Police Department
- Rosedale Police Department
- Ruleville Police Department
- Saltillo Police Department
- Sardis Police Department
- Scooba Police Department
- Senatobia Police Department
- Shannon Police Department
- Shaw Police Department
- Shelby Police Department
- Sherman Police Department
- Soso Police Department
- Smithville Police Department
- Southaven Police Department
- Starkville Police Department
- Stonewall Police Department
- Summit Police Department
- Sumrall Police Department
- Sunflower Police Department
- Taylorsville Police Department
- Tchula Police Department
- Tupelo Police Department
- Tutwiler Police Department
- Tylertown Police Department
- Union Police Department
- University Police Department
- Vaiden Police Department
- Vicksburg Police Department
- Walls Police Department
- Walnut Police Department
- Walnut Grove Police Department
- Water Valley Police Department
- Waveland Police Department
- Waynesboro Police Department
- Wesson Police Department
- West Point Police Department
- Wiggins Police Department
- Winona Police Department
- Woodville Police Department
- Yazoo City Police Department

== College and university agencies ==
- Alcorn State University Police Department
- Jackson State University Police Department
- Mississippi State University Police Department
- University of Mississippi Medical Center Police Department
- University of Mississippi Police Department
- University of Southern Mississippi Police Department
- Mississippi Gulf Coast Community College Campus Police Department

Meridian community college campus police

== Other agencies ==
- Jackson Municipal Airport Authority Police Department
- Tupelo Airport Authority Police Department

- Federal Bureau of Investigation
