= List of killings by law enforcement officers in the United States, March 2023 =

This is a list of people reported killed by non-military law enforcement officers in the United States in March 2023, whether in the line of duty or not, and regardless of reason or method. The listing documents the occurrence of a death, making no implications regarding wrongdoing or justification on the part of the person killed or officer involved. Killings are arranged by date of the incident that caused death. Different death dates, if known, are noted in the description. The table below lists 68 people.

== March 2023 ==
Date	Name (age) of deceased	Race	Location	Description
2023-03-31	Jose Gonzales Morales (30)	Hispanic	City Terrace, California	Morales was shot to death by Monterey Park police after allegedly shooting at them while running across I-10. Morales was a robbery suspect.
2023-03-31	Christopher Rothermund (52)	Unknown	Craig, Colorado	A suspect with an outstanding warrant fled from police and was shot after allegedly pulling out a gun on officers during a foot chase.
2023-03-31	William Dunson (50)	Black	Springfield Township, Ohio	While responding to a call, Springfield Township Police Officer Nick Unwin lost control of his vehicle while changing lanes. The cruiser flipped and rolled into a southbound lane, where it hit the car driven by Dunson. Both Unwin and Dunson died in the crash.
2023-03-30	Cody Dylan Brady (27)	White	Rocky Hill, Kentucky	Brady fled from a traffic stop in Brownsville and was shot when he fired a gun in direction of pursuing state troopers.
2023-03-30	Isaiah James Rael (43)	Black	El Paso, Texas	Rael was subject to a traffic stop after threatening a woman and her daughter at gunpoint. He refused to comply with several commands, after which a taser was used on Rael. Officers then shot him for allegedly pulling out a gun.
2023-03-29	Richard Ring (39)	White	Chandler, Arizona	Police were called after Ring allegedly stole merchandise from a hardware store and ran. Police shot Richard who cut his throat while in a mental crisis.
2023-03-29	Steven Blunt (29)	Black	Douglasville, Georgia	Blunt had brought a gun to a high school event and after police confronted him, he was shot after opening fire on officers.
2023-03-29	Tiye Adam Washington II (26)	Black	Rutherford County, North Carolina	Washington, who was wanted for injuring three people in a shooting in Glen Allen, Virginia, opened fire on by deputies searching for him. He was killed after injuring an officer in the shootout.
2023-03-28	Joseph Martin (28)	White	Surprise, Arizona	Police were called to expel a man parked outside a Walmart for being intoxicated and littering after ignoring staff. Martin was shot when he informed officers he had a gun and reached towards his waistband.
2023-03-28	Brandunn Wilson (28)	White	North Fork, California	Wilson, suspecting in the fatal shooting of a man, was shot and killed following a pursuit and shootout.
2023-03-28	Paul Palafox (34)	Hispanic	San Antonio, Texas	Palafox injured a 66-year old man in a shooting and later fired an AR-15-style rifle at officers from behind parked cars. He was shot by police and died two days later.
2023-03-27	Mariana Martinez (17)	Unknown	Lakewood, Colorado	The juvenile female suspect was shot and killed while exchanging gunfire with police after robbing a postal worker.
2023-03-27	Michael Christopher Nunez (47)	White	Desoto, Texas	Police responded to a burglary and shot Nunez after he allegedly approached officers brandishing an unidentified object.
2023-03-27	Aiden Hale (28)	White	Nashville, Tennessee	Hale killed three students and three employees at a private elementary school before being killed by police.
2023-03-27	Jorge Luis Vega-Lesama	Hispanic	Raleigh, North Carolina	Police responded to reports of a man brandishing a gun near a middle school and killed a man after a shootout.
2023-03-26	Calvin Wayne Black (58)	Unknown	Gastonia, North Carolina	A man suspected of assaulting a woman and shooting a man was shot by police after allegedly firing at officers.
2023-03-26	Dylan Murphy (33)	White	Sandy, Utah	A man called police because his brother had attempted suicide. Officers found Murphy standing on the road bleeding and shot him when he charged at them. It remains unclear whether he was armed.
2023-03-25	Manuel Reyes Rios (19)	Hispanic	Santa Maria, California	A man pulled out a gun during a fight in a parking lot and was shot by an off-duty deputy.
2023-03-25	Brian Payne (54)	White	Moore, Oklahoma	Officers ran a license plate check on a car occupied by Payne, which showed it was reported as stolen. When police attempted arrest, he pulled out a knife and threatened suicide. Payne fled on foot and was shot when he approached officers.
2023-03-25	Vilene Not Afraid (35)	Native American	Billings, Montana	A woman shot a firearm in the air and then stole a vehicle. The woman then led police in a vehicle-pursuit. The suspect then collided with two uninvolved vehicles and came to a stop. Officers tried to talk Not Afraid out of the vehicle, but Not Afraid refused to comply. After SWAT officers deployed gas to get her out of the vehicle, Not Afraid exited the vehicle brandishing a firearm and pointed at the officers. The police then shot Not Afraid. Not Afraid was taken to a hospital where she later died.
2023-03-25	Spencer Jackson (31)	White	Kinston, North Carolina	A man drove away from officers conducting a traffic stop. Police followed the suspect to his home, from which he emerged wielding a rifle and was shot when he pointed the gun at them.
2023-03-24	Larry Ray Scott (66)	Unknown	Raeford, North Carolina	Police were serving a high-risk warrant at the house of two brothers, where they found the men inside armed. One complied with an order to drop the weapons, while the other did not and was shot in return.
2023-03-24	Michael Anthony Oles (46)	White	San Antonio, Texas	Oles was wanted for aggravated assault with a deadly weapon and shot by federal marshals when he pointed a gun at them.
2023-03-24	Rosendo Enrique Rivero (25)	Black	Kay County, Oklahoma	Rivero robbed a bank in Wellington, Kansas and engaged police in a high-speed chase. Oklahoma Highwasy Patrol went to arrest him after entering the state after which he fled on foot and started a shootout that ended with Rivero being fatally shot. Rivero was already wanted for shooting and injuring his girlfriend's grandmother in Miami-Dade County, Florida on March 17.
2023-03-24	Mark Engele (53)	Unknown	Dickson County, Tennessee	Engele was shot by police while holding a woman hostage and firing at officers, injuring one of them.
2023-03-24	Branden Vorak (25)	White	Midland, Washington	Vorak had made threats against his former employer at a convenience store and was found by police wielding a grenade with its pin pulled. Less-than-lethal means were used to attempt to subdue Vorak, but failed. He was shot after pulling out a handgun; the explosive, did not detonate and was rendered safe by a response team.
2023-03-23	Odell Hicks Jr. (51)	Black	Karnack, Texas	Hicks was shot by police who had been called to the scene of a fight.
2023-03-23	Alberto Montes II (20)	Black	Houston, Texas	Two men allegedly kidnapped two migrants and held them for ransom at a motel in the Greenspoint neighborhood for five days. During a raid by the FBI's Hostage Rescue Team and ensuing shootout an agent shot and killed one of the kidnappers. The other was arrested, and the two migrants were rescued. Another eight individuals, including two minors, were arrested in connection to a suspected human trafficking the kidnappers were associated with.
2023-03-22	Eliobert Gonzalez-Rocha (35)	Hispanic	San Jose, California	Gonzalez-Rocha broke into an apartment he had been previously evicted from and demanded the keys from the new tenant, a mother with her two children, before holding them hostage with two machetes, a metal rod, and a replica gun. Officers shot Gonzalez-Rocha when he raised one of the machetes towards the hostages.
2023-03-21	Xavier Sanchez (18)	Hispanic	Monte Vista, Colorado	A resident reported a man with two knives inside his home. The suspect was shot after coming at officers with the weapons.
2023-03-21	Ronald Lee Winborne (53)	White	Henderson, Nevada	Police tased Winborne after he allegedly raised a butter knife at officers before restraining him. While in custody a week later his health began to decline and he died. His death was ruled a homicide due to a broken collarbone.
2023-03-20	Brendon Burns (35)	White	Rochester, New York	Burns ran away from a traffic stop after threatening deputies with a knife. He was killed after refusing to drop the shotgun he was holding.
2023-03-18	Christopher Michael Martinez (34)	Hispanic	Englewood, Colorado	Officers were called to a hotel after the 911 caller said a man, Martinez, was pointing and threatening to rob, shoot them. Officers found him shortly after he left the hotel and after a foot pursuit, shot him.
2023-03-18	Guillermo Huerta (35)	Hispanic	Bakersfield, California	A man was acting erratically on a parking lot while holding a sharp object, initially reported as a knife, but was later found to be a screwdriver. He ran away from police and was shot when he was caught after he did not comply with a command.
2023-03-18	Coy Jackson (33)	White	Fresno, California	Jackson, who was armed with a knife, was shot outside a Fresno Police station.
2023-03-18	Dalaneo Martin (17)	Black	Washington, D.C.	Police responded to reports of a stolen vehicle and found Martin sleeping in a car. After discussing how to approach the situation, officers approached the car and attempted to pull Martin out as a United States Park Police officer entered the backseat and yelled at Martin not to move. Martin began to drive away, and after ordering him to stop, the Park Police officer shot him. A gun was recovered from the vehicle.
2023-03-16	Edridge Alexis (36)	Black	North Miami Beach, Florida	Alexis, who had taken a woman hostage, was shot and killed by officers.
2023-03-15	Robert Bruce Clendenin (76)	White	Temple, Georgia	Police were called to a dispute between neighbors, during which Clendenin had made a gun threat and fired a shot. Clendenin was shot dead after allegedly aiming his gun at officers.
2023-03-15	Michael Obregon (36)	Unknown	Casa Grande, Arizona	Obregon was shot during a field interview with police over a potentially stolen bicycle after he pulled out a gun.
2023-03-14	Frank Jerry Millsapps (65)	White	Talking Rock, Georgia	Millsapps was shot dead after pointing his shotgun at deputies. Millsapps had shot a neighbor prior to the incident.
2023-03-14	Nicholas Mauro Sosa (37)	Hispanic	Tucson, Arizona	An armed robber was shot inside a restaurant when he pointed his gun at officers.
2023-03-12	Zion Bostick (23)	White	Pinellas Park, Florida	Bostick, who was breaking into cars in the neighborhood, was spotted by a police dog, when he fled until he reached a backyard. At the backyard, Bostick shot and injured a deputy, then another deputy shot him.
2023-03-12	Kyle Nicholas Sostek (34)	White	Big Bear, California	Sostek was shot by police after a vehicle pursuit stemming from an outstanding arrest warrant.
2023-03-12	Adam Barcenas (60)	Latino	Oxnard, California	Officers were conducting a DUI investigation when Barcenas, who was uninvolved in the investigation, approached officers with a steel bar. Barcenas approached the officers while shouting at them, leading police to shoot and kill him.
2023-03-10	Kainoa Kahele-Bishop (32)	Pacific Islander	Kailua-Kona, Hawaii	Police searching for a shooting suspect found Kahele-Bishop with several other people and stolen vehicles. Police followed one of the cars, a Chevy Malibu, and pursued it to an intersection. After police commanded the driver to show his hands, police shot him after he allegedly reached for an object. The driver was killed, while a passenger suffered minor injuries in the resulting crash. Police say two firearms were recovered from the vehicle.
2023-03-07	Roy Streat (78)	White	Nicholls, Georgia	Streat was confronted by police for pointing a gun at a city employee with a gun and was shot for brandishing the weapon at officers; a previously deployed taser had failed. Streat's family stated that he suffered from dementia and the gun he carried was unloaded.
2023-03-07	Kordell Jones (24)	Black	Mobile, Alabama	Police shot a man with a "AR-type" gun in his hands while he was fleeing the site of a raid.
2023-03-07	Manuel Sanabria (38)	Latino	Fort Lauderdale, Florida	Police pursued Sanabria, who was wanted in connection with a murder in Port St. Lucie the evening prior. Following the chase Sanabria exited his vehicle holding part of a gun, and police shot him.
2023-03-06	Andrew Edelmann (22)	White	Wilmington, Delaware	Edelmann was shot after he allegedly accelerated his vehicle in the direction of officers. His 21-year-old female passenger was also wounded. On March 20, 2024, Edelmann's shooting was deemed justified.
2023-03-06	Irvo N. Otieno (28)	Black	Dinwiddie, Virginia	Seven Henrico County deputies arrived at a mental health hospital to admit Otieno, an inmate, for treatment. Few details were released, but police stated that Otieno was combative with deputies, who restrained him. Otieno died, and the seven deputies were charged with second-degree murder eight days later. Three hospital employees were also charged a few days later.
2023-03-06	Anthony Castro (40)	Unknown	Phoenix, Arizona	Castro was shot to death after stabbing his wife to death.
2023-03-06	James Saucedo (42)	Hispanic	Phoenix, Arizona	Saucedo had shot and injured a woman, and when he pulled a gun on officers he was fatally shot.
2023-03-05	Dexter Wade (37)	Black	Jackson, Mississippi	Wade was struck and killed by a Jackson police car as he crossed the interstate. Following his death police claimed they sent a voicemail to his mother, though she denied receiving one. Wade's mother reported him missing, and she was not informed of her son's death until months later, after the county had buried Wade alongside unclaimed bodies in a pauper's field. Wade was the nephew of George Robinson, who was also killed by Jackson Police.
2023-03-04	Roberto Corchado (29)	Latino	Fresno, California	Police pursued Corchado, who was suspected of leaving a traffic stop earlier in the day. Police used a maneuver to stop his vehicle at an intersection near a Walmart parking lot. As shown in video, Corchado exited his vehicle with his hands raised. Several officers approached, with one shouting commands, and less than a minute later police fired eight to ten rounds. The California Department of Justice stated they would investigate the shooting as part of a state law requiring them to investigate all fatal police shootings where the deceased is unarmed. The Fresno Police Department reported Corchado had fired on officers, striking one in his body armor, and later released a photograph of the damaged armor.
2023-03-04	Okwan Rahmier Sims (21)	Black	Stillwater, Minnesota	Stillwater police responded to an active shooter situation at an apartment building. Police officers encountered gunfire when they arrived in the parking lot and two or three people had been shot. Several police squad cars were struck by gunfire. The officers returned fire, killing the gunman.
2023-03-04	Joseph Sherrill (44)	White	Frederick, Maryland	Police arrived to arrest Sherrill for a probation violation. Officers found Sherrill in a closet, and shot him when he allegedly approached officers with a knife.
2023-03-03	Phillip Christopher Peinado (58)	White	North Las Vegas, Nevada	Police shot Peinado during a traffic stop after he allegedly reached for a firearm.
2023-03-03	Aaron Martinka (28)	Black	Tucson, Arizona	Police pursued Martinka for a probation violation. After the chase, police shot Martinka after he allegedly shot at officers.
2023-03-03	Najee Seabrooks (31)	Black	Paterson, New Jersey	Police responded to an emotionally disturbed person at the home of local activist Seabrooks. After barricading himself for five hours, police say an officer shot Seabrooks after he approached police with a knife.
2023-03-03	Ronald Wilson (56)	White	North Fork, California	Wilson, suspected in the fatal shooting of a man, was shot and killed following a pursuit and shootout.
2023-03-02	James Pavlista (58)	White	Elsanor, Alabama	A deputy shot Pavlista after he allegedly charged at him with a knife.
2023-03-02	Brett Cameron Carter (34)	White	Liverpool, Texas	Police responded to reports of a man in a dumpster at a Lake Jackson elementary school and pursued him after he stole a truck. Following a chase the truck crashed, and police shot Carter after he charged at them with a knife.
2023-03-02	Donovan Adrian Watson (25)	Black	Miami, Florida	Watson shot and killed 38-year-old Jean Gutierrez. Watson was shot dead by police after a standoff.
2023-03-01	Tony A. Smith (64)	White	Mountain City, Tennessee	During a welfare check police shot Smith after he allegedly fired at them.
2023-03-01	Daniel Ramone Scott (25)	Black	Ashburn, Georgia	Police pulled over Scott for a suspected burglary. After he T-boned an officer's vehicle, Scott was handcuffed. According to police, Scott managed to get control of a police vehicle and began to drive off, at which point police shot him.
2023-03-01	Stormy Fuller (32)	White	Tulsa, Oklahoma	Police encountered Fuller during a burglary. After firing a shot at police, Fuller ran and was shot by police after allegedly pointing a shotgun at them.
2023-03-01	Tony Raymond Gutierrez (40)	Hispanic	Pueblo, Colorado	Police responded to reports of shots fired at a home near a school. Following an armed standoff, police shot the man after he allegedly pointed a gun at SWAT officers.
2023-03-01	Chase Allan (25)	White	Farmington, Utah	Police pulled Allan over for not having a legitimate license plate, which the Standard-Examiner reported was a placard proclaiming constitutional sovereignty instead of a license. After refusing to provide identification to the officer, police attempted to remove him from the vehicle, during which an officer shot Allan. Police stated an empty holster was found on his hip and a gun was found in the driver's side floor.

== See also ==
- Death in custody § United States
- Henry A. Wallace Police Crime Public Database
- List of cases of police brutality
- List of countries with annual rates and counts for killings by law enforcement officers
- List of law enforcement officers killed in the line of duty in the United States
- List of law enforcement officers convicted for an on-duty killing in the United States
- List of shootings by US immigration agents
- List of police reforms related to the George Floyd protests
- List of unarmed African Americans killed by law enforcement officers in the United States
- Lists of killings by law enforcement officers
- Police brutality in the United States
- Police misconduct § United States
- Police riot § United States
- Police use of deadly force in the United States
