= Mississippi State Capitol =

State capitol building of the U.S. state of Mississippi

- U.S. National Register of Historic Places
- U.S. National Historic Landmark
- Mississippi Landmark
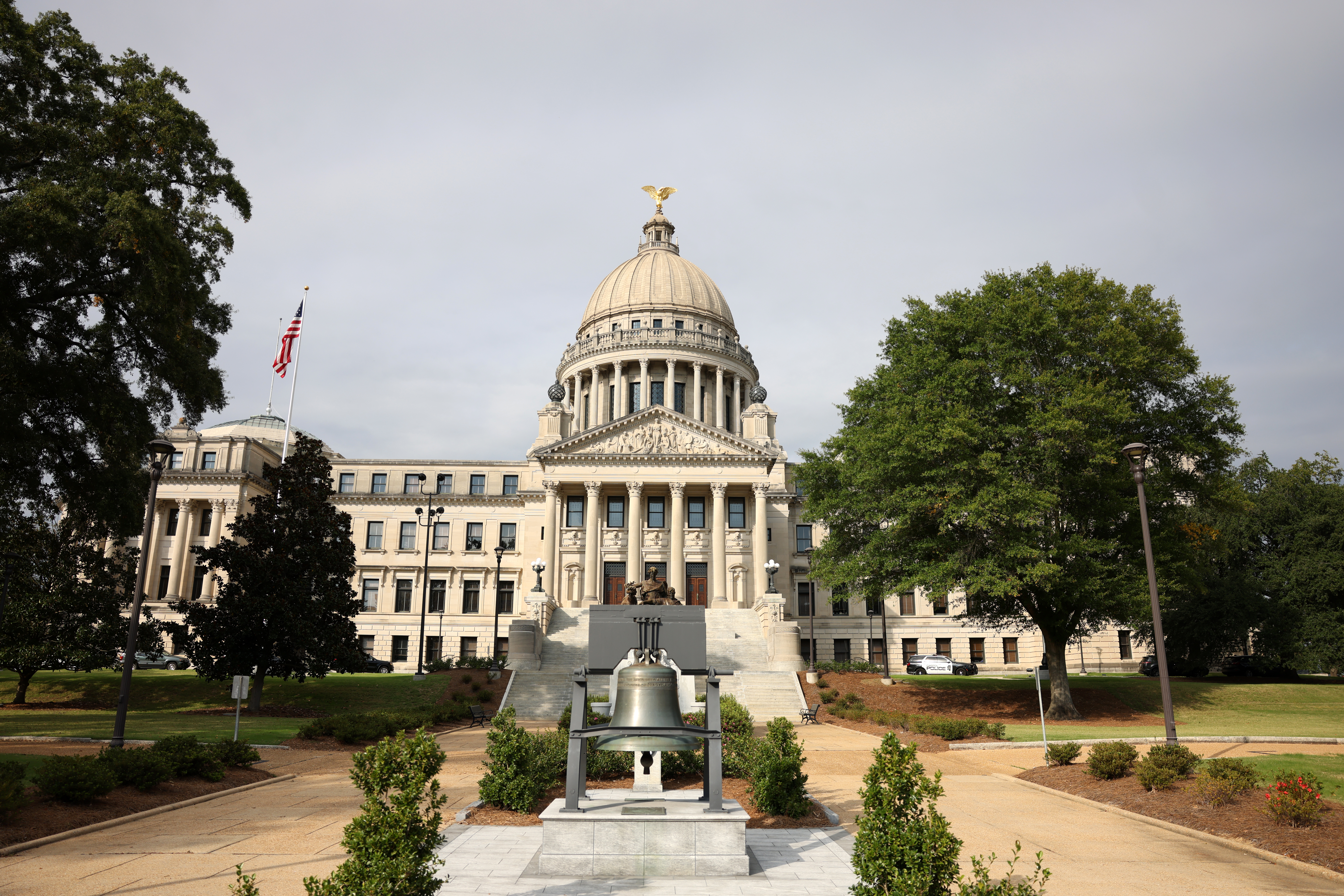

- Location within Mississippi Location within the United States
- Location: Fronting on Mississippi Street, Jackson, Mississippi
- Coordinates: 32°18′14″N 90°10′56″W
- Built: 1903; 123 years ago
- Architects: Theodore C. Link; Bernard R. Green
- Architectural style: Beaux Arts; Classical Revival
- NRHP reference No.: 69000086
- USMS No.: 049-JAC-0001-NR-ML

Significant dates
- Added to NRHP: November 25, 1969
- Designated NHL: October 31, 2016
- Designated USMS: March 5, 1986

The Mississippi State Capitol or the “New Capitol,” has been the seat of the state’s government since it succeeded the old Mississippi State House in 1903. Located in the centrally located state capital / capital city of Jackson, in Hinds County, it was designated as a Mississippi Landmark in 1986, and subsequently a National Historic Landmark in 2016. It was added to the National Register of Historic Places in 1969.

== History ==
After years of public debate, the 35th Governor of Mississippi Andrew Houston Longino (1854–1942, served 1900–1904), who took office in January 1900, soon convinced the members of both chambers of the Mississippi Legislature, that it was finally time to construct a new Capitol in Jackson, and he was appointed chairman of the State House Commission in the following month of February 1900 by the State Legislature.

Fourteen architects submitted plans in response to the architectural contest advertised though newspapers in five large prominent cities across the country seeking submissions of bids and proposal drawings. Bernard R. Green, the architect / engineer who designed the Library of Congress's Thomas Jefferson Building in Washington, D.C., was hired as a consultant by the State House Commission of Mississippi to review the submissions; he chose the plans prepared by architect Theodore C. Link (1850–1923), of St. Louis, Missouri.

Erected on the former site of the old Mississippi State Penitentiary, the Capitol was completed within 28 months of construction between January 1, 1901, and August 20, 1903, at a cost of $1,093,641. Most fortuitously, rather than issuing bonds as was planned, the cost of the Capitol was paid in full at its 1903 completion after the State of Mississippi was awarded a substantial windfall of one million dollars in a legal lawsuit settlement ordered by the U.S. Supreme Court in Washington for back taxes owed by the Illinois Central Railroad of Chicago.

The Capitol originally housed all three branches of typical American government - legislative, executive, and judicial. Currently, the Legislative branch is the only full-time serving branch still remaining. The Mississippi Supreme Court met in the New State Capitol for seven decades from 1903 until 1973. The main offices of the Governor of Mississippi are currently residing across the street in the Walter Sillers Building.

In 1933–1934, a major repainting program transformed the interior of the Capitol from its original plain white plaster ceilings to a much more colorful and decorative palette. This project, funded by the Civil Works Administration (C.W.A.) and overseen by Jackson architect A. Hays Town, included artwork in the domes of the central Rotunda and that of the Senate Chamber.

Again from 1979 through 1982, the Mississippi Capitol underwent its most significant renovations in its century and quarter history. During the $19 million project the Mississippi Legislature met across town in Jackson’s old Central High School. Mezzanine levels were installed in the second floor offices to increase the staff working area. The major public areas of the building, including the chambers of the House of Representatives, Senate and old Mississippi Supreme Court chambers; and the Governor’s Reception Room; Rotunda; Hall of History and its historical exhibits; and the elaborate decorated United Daughters of the Confederacy Reception Room were also restored.

In 2024, Alyce Clarke was the first African American and the first woman to have their portrait placed on display at the capitol.

== Architecture ==
The Capitol exemplifies Beaux Arts classicism in architecture.

The Capitol is 402 feet in width, 225 feet in depth, with a total of 171,000 square feet. The central dome rises 180 feet above ground level.

The exterior walls of the Capitol are Indiana limestone and the base and stairs are Georgia granite. The drum of the main dome is a limestone-colored terra cotta and is surrounded by a limestone colonnade. The eagle that stands atop is eight feet tall and 15 feet wide, made of copper, and gilded with gold leaf.

Inside the Capitol are more than ten types of marble from other states and countries and eight types of art marble, known as scagliola. Architect Theodore Link used the new technology of electric lighting when designing the Capitol and incorporated 4,750 electric fixtures, which are still being used today.

Windows of stained and leaded glass, crafted by Louis Millet of Chicago, Illinois, are original and adorn the grand staircase, domes and walls of the chambers of the Senate and House of Representatives, Governor’s Office, and other spaces within the building. The ceilings of the third and fourth floor corridors contain Millet’s stained glass and work with the skylights on the roof and with the glass cylinders within the marble of the fourth floor as a skylight system to provide natural light along those corridors.

The ground floor’s Hall of Governors displays portraits of the former governors of Mississippi, beginning with the first territorial governor, Winthrop Sargent.

The main Rotunda is located on the second floor with walls of Italian white marble trimmed with Belgian black marble, cast iron balustrades with architectural motifs encircling the space, and the central dome rising above allowing in natural light to mix with the original electric light fixtures. A relief sculpture of Lady Justice is seen above each of the top arches.

The Rotunda also displays all the major classical orders, including Roman Doric on the first level (second floor), Ionic on the second level (third floor), and the highest order in the Composite capitals on the monumental columns.

The second floor also houses the old Supreme Court and the old State Library.

In addition to the chambers of the Senate and the House of Representatives, the third floor is home to the offices of the Lieutenant Governor and the Speaker of the House, and the ceremonial office of the Governor. The Senate has 52 members. The House of Representatives has 122 members.

The public galleries of the Senate and the House of Representatives are located on the fourth floor.

On top of the state capital building is a gold-plated American Bald Eagle figurine, facing south.

== Visitation ==
The Capitol is open Monday–Friday, 8 a.m.–5 p.m and closed on weekends. Guided tours are conducted free of charge by staff and volunteers. Tours are given Monday–Friday at 9:30 a.m. and 11 a.m. and 1 p.m. and 2:30 p.m., or visitors are welcome to do a self-guided tour anytime between 8 a.m.–5 p.m. There is also a gift shop that is open Monday–Friday, 9 a.m.–4 p.m. It is closed on weekends.

== Popular culture ==
- The Capitol is featured in the following films:
  - The Chamber (1996)
  - The Help (2011)

== Gallery ==
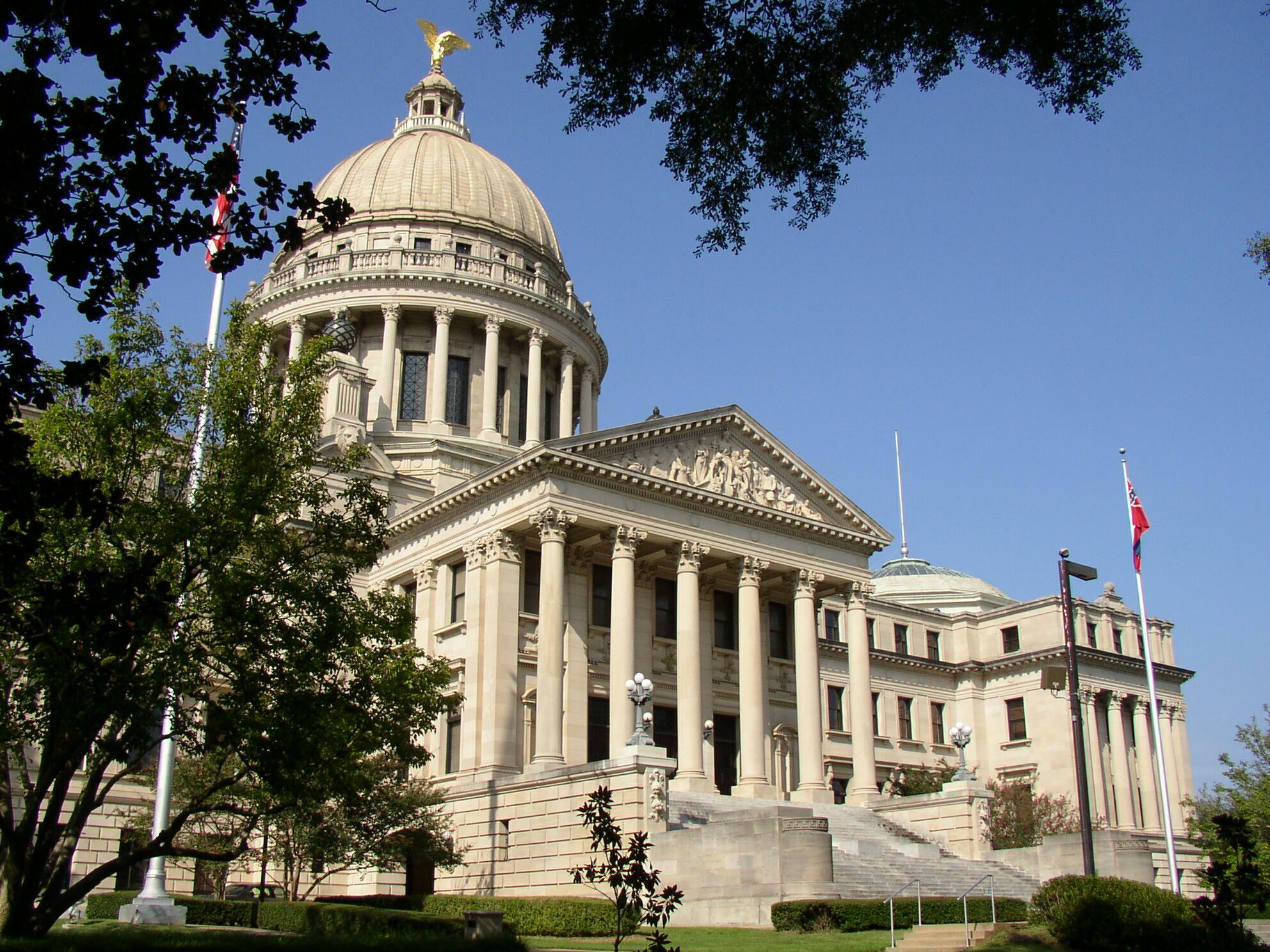
Another perspective of the "New" Mississippi State Capitol building

Mississippi State Capitol in 2026

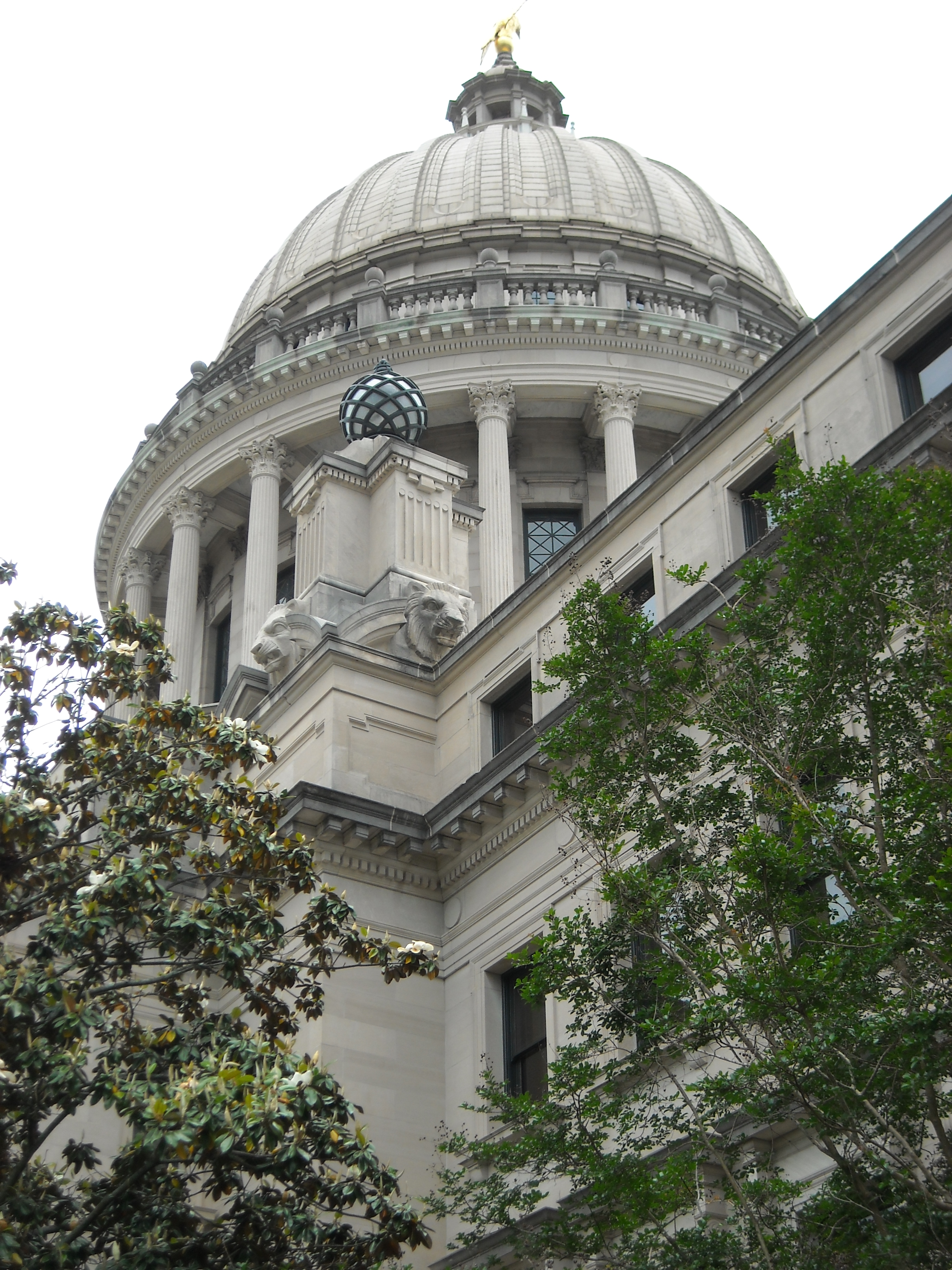
Another perspective of the "New" Mississippi State Capitol building

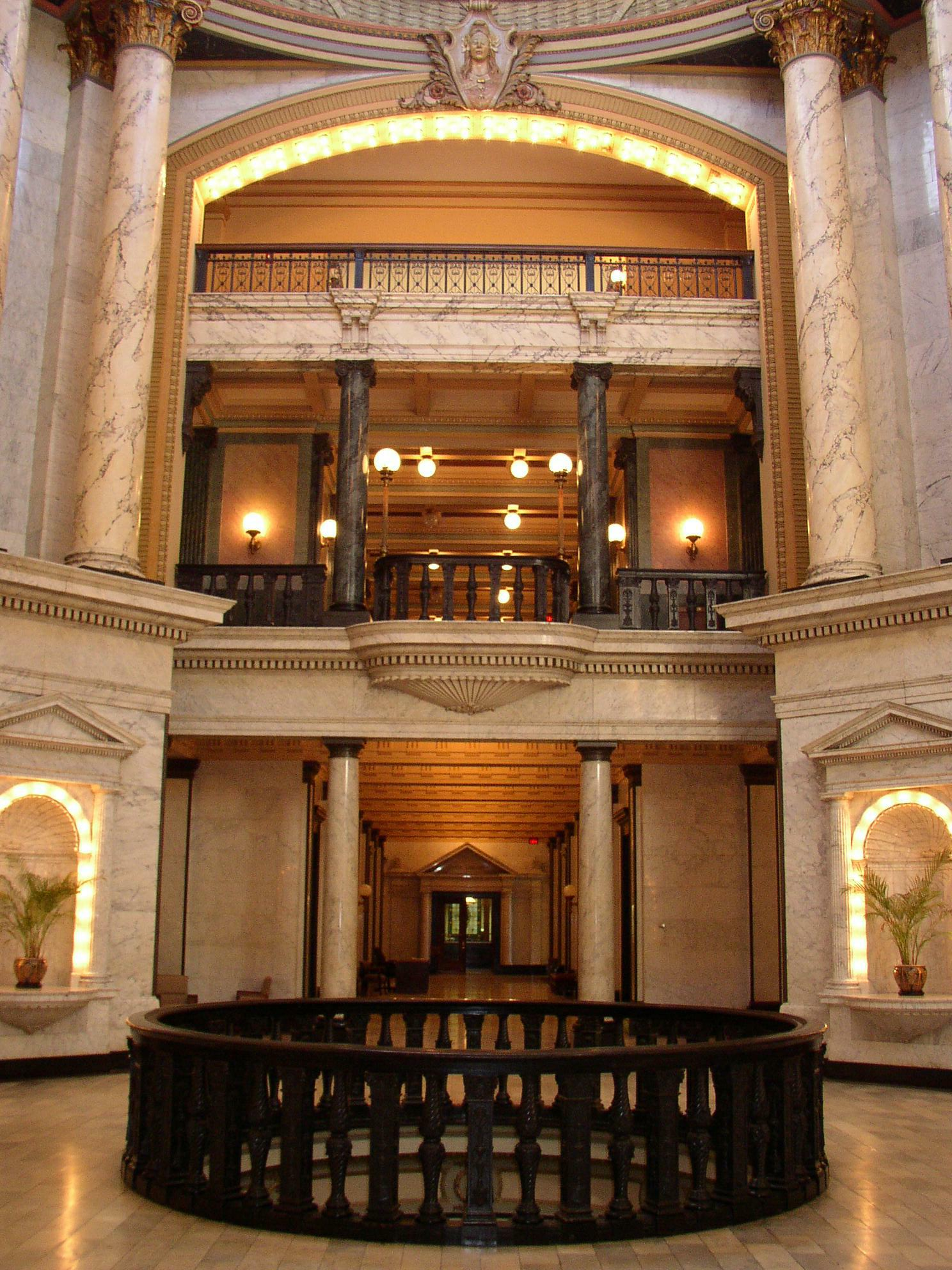
"New" Mississippi State Capitol rotunda

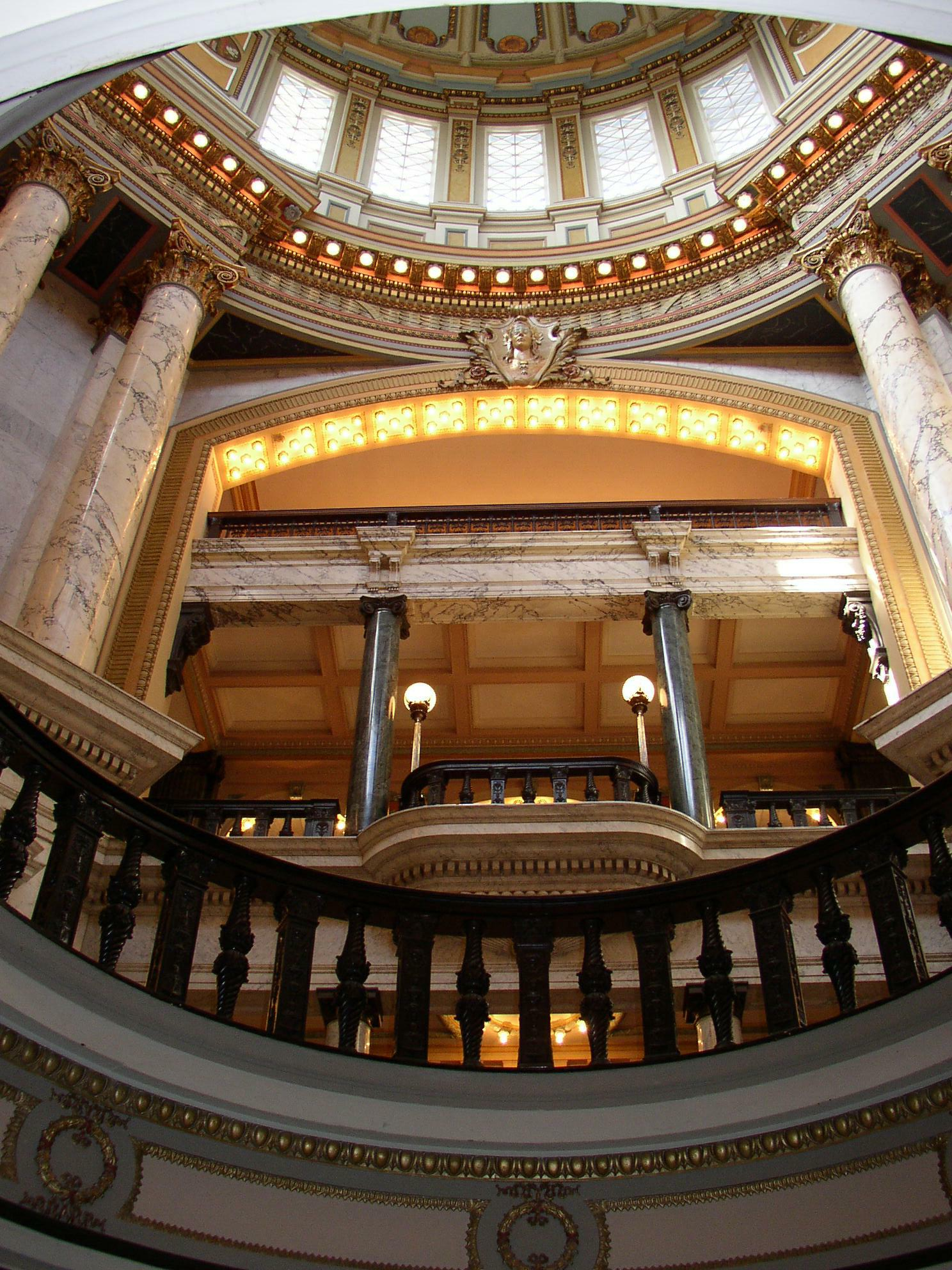
"New" Mississippi State Capitol second floor facing upward

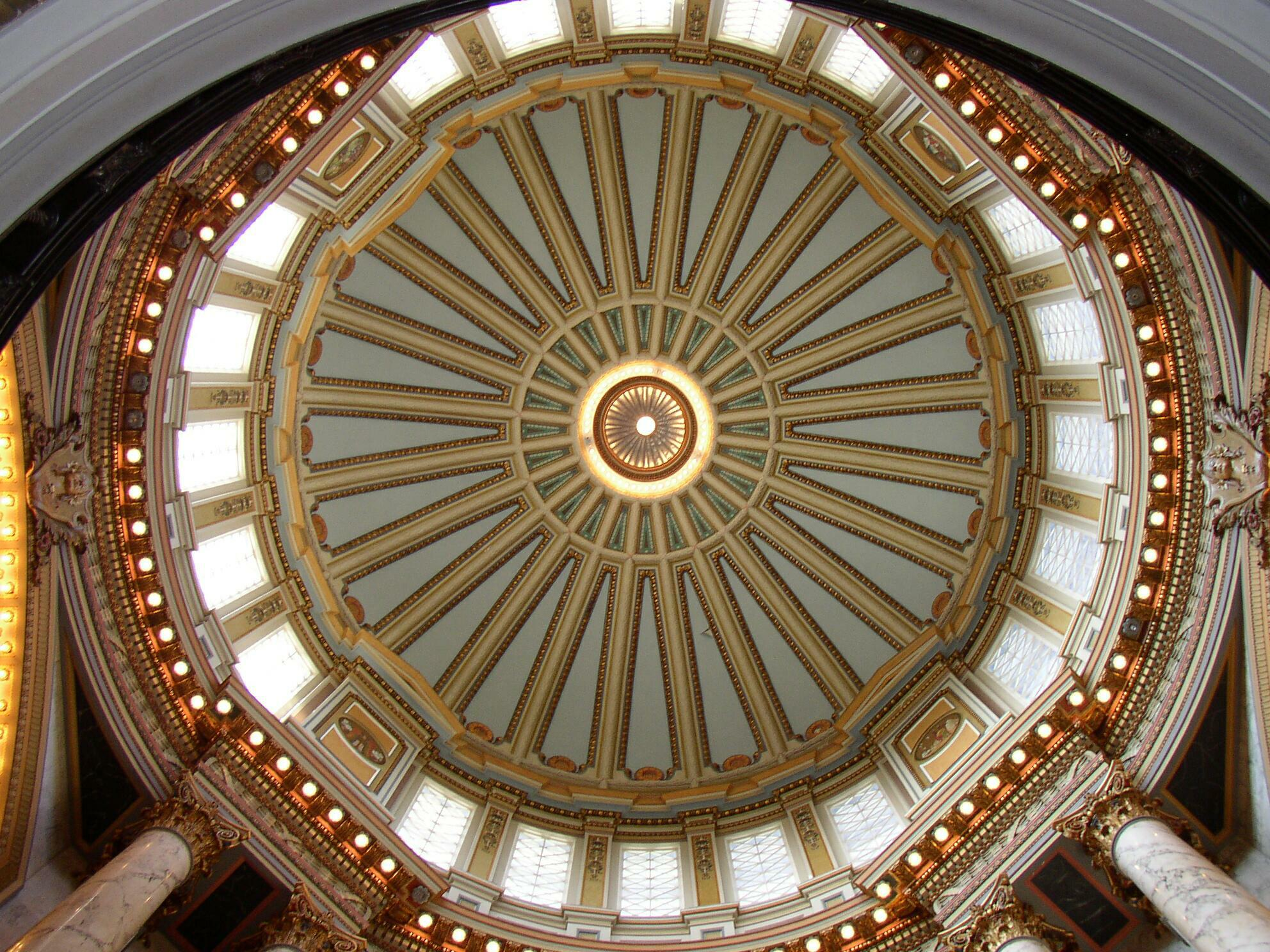
"New" Mississippi State Capitol inner dome

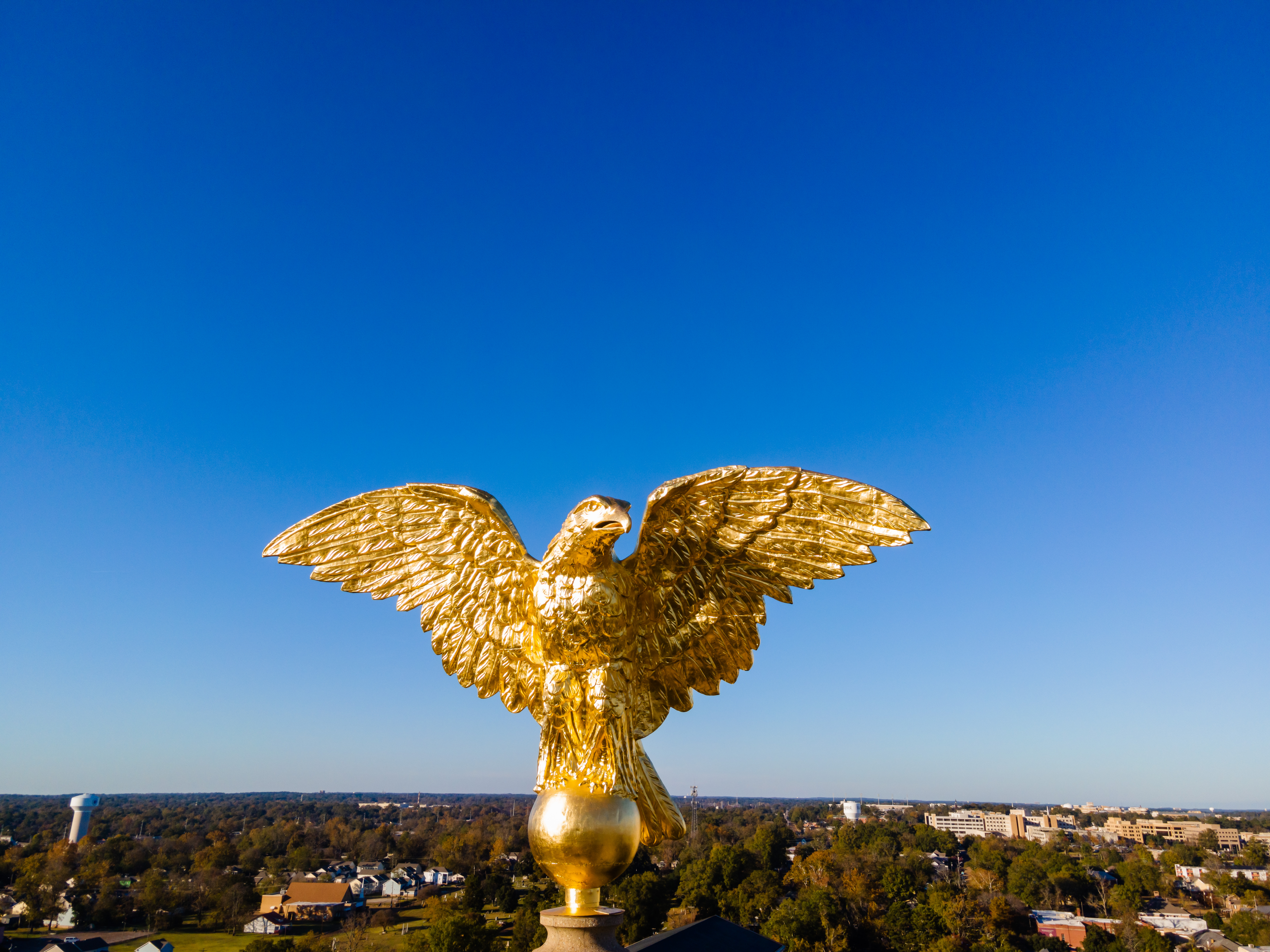
The gold eagle atop the Mississippi State Capitol Building

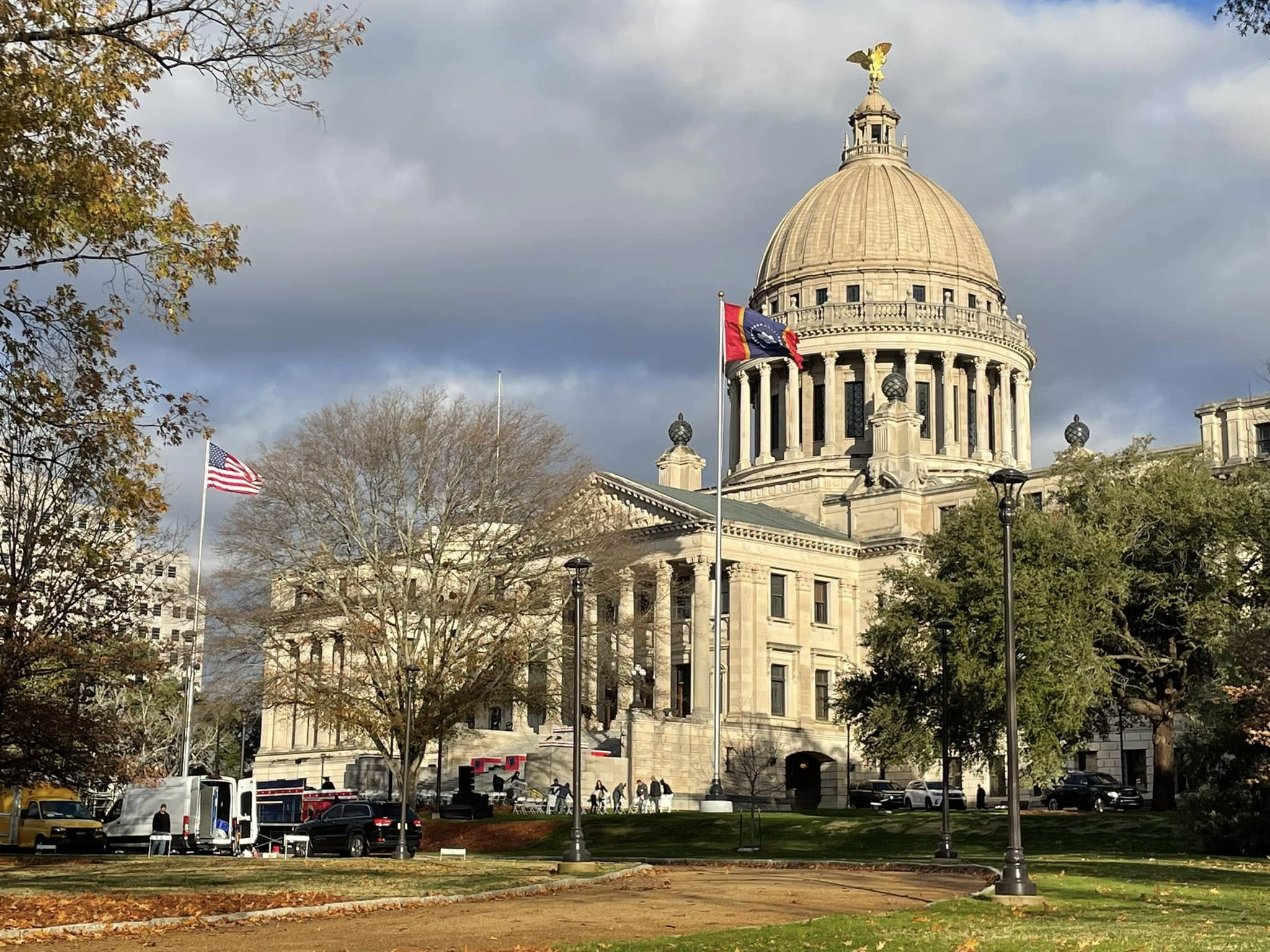
A look at the Mississippi State Capitol Building from the east

== Capitol Complex Improvement District ==
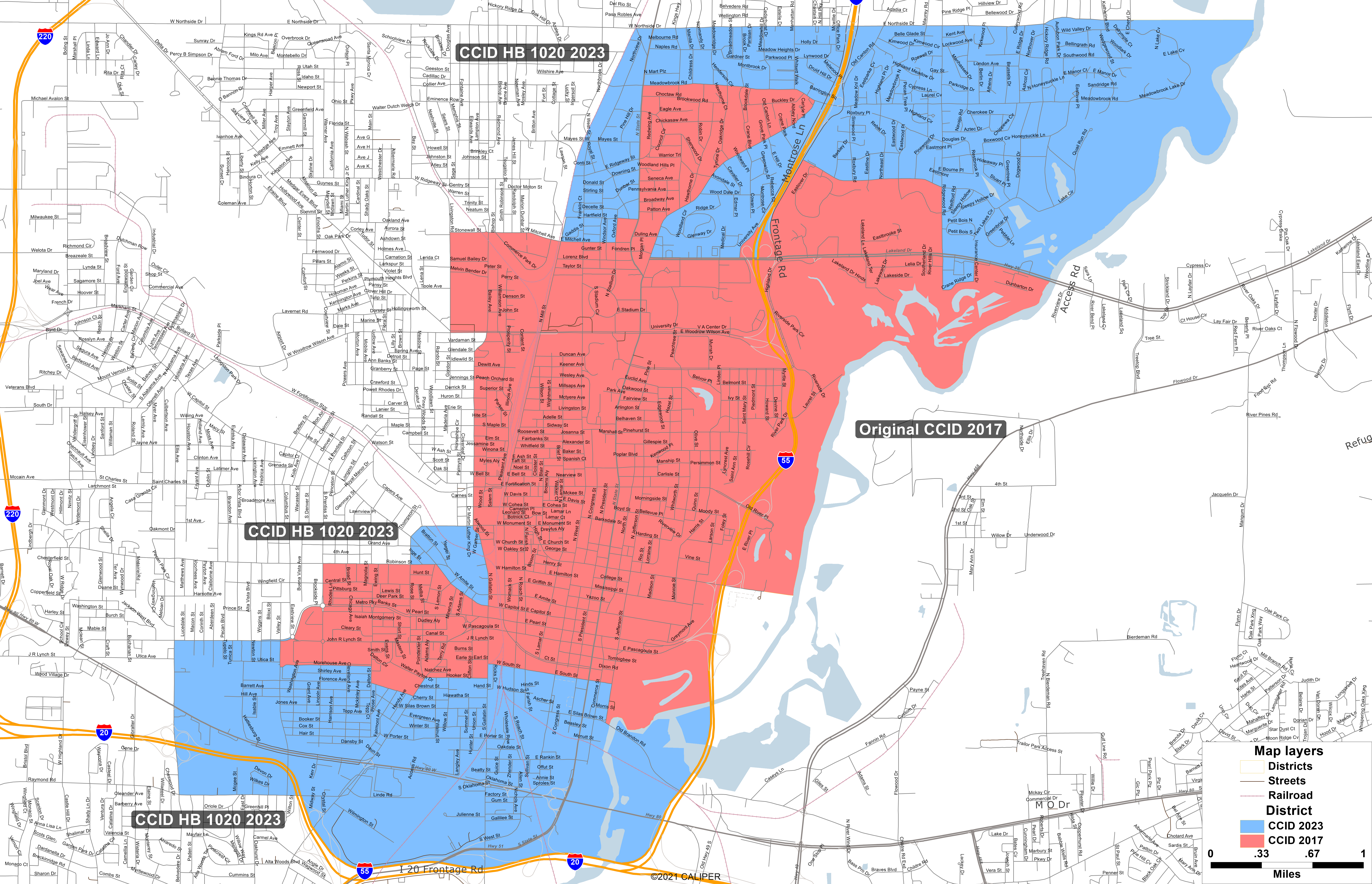
Map of the CCID. Red areas show the original District created in 2017, with blue showing additional areas added by the state legislature in 2023.

The Capitol Complex Improvement District (CCID) was created by the Mississippi Legislature in 2017 as a means to improve infrastructure in areas of Jackson near the Capitol and other state government property. Although its legal intention is to operate similarly to a business improvement district for government properties, it also came to serve as an expanded jurisdictional limit for the Mississippi Capitol Police to patrol beyond the immediate blocks surrounding the Capitol property. This expansion of the Capitol Police's powers and patrol area was seen as preemptive power grab by Legislature Republicans of the Democrat-led City of Jackson. The bill authors cite it as a response to crime in Jackson. The law expanding the CCID also creates a separate court to prosecute state law offenses cited by the Capitol Police. Theses courts would have judges appointed by the Supreme Court of Mississippi and prosecutors appointed by the Governor rather than the elected judges and prosecutors of the Hinds County court system.

Former Mayor Chokwe Antar Lumumba called the policing expansion "an attack on Black leadership in every form" and "apartheid" as the state-run police patrolling neighborhoods in the majority Black city is less responsive to community concerns and local authority.

The District is under the management of the state Department of Finance & Administration which develops a comprehensive master plan in consultation with the CCID Project Advisory Committee. This committee is composed of representatives and appointees of the Governor, Lieutenant Governor, Speaker of the House, the Mayor of Jackson, Jackson City Council, Jackson State University, and University of Mississippi Medical Center. Jesse O'Quinn currently serves as the Director of CCID and Assistant Director of Bureau of Building within the Department of Finance & Administration. The Capitol Police is responsive to the Mississippi Department of Public Safety.

== See also ==
- List of governors of Mississippi
- List of lieutenant governors of Mississippi
- List of Mississippi state legislatures
- List of state and territorial capitols in the United States

== Works cited ==
- Southwick, Leslie (1998). "Mississippi Supreme Court Elections: A Historical Perspective 1916-1996". Mississippi College Law Review. 18 (1): 115–198.
