= Mississippi Department of Public Safety =

U.S. state law enforcement agency

Department of Public Safety

Department overview
- Headquarters: 1900 E Woodrow Wilson Ave; Jackson, Mississippi
- Employees: Approx. 1 400 (2021)
- Annual budget: Approx. $147 000 000
- Department executive: Sean Tindell, Commissioner
- Website: www.dps.ms.gov

The Mississippi Department of Public Safety (DPS) is an administrative department of the Government of Mississippi, headquartered in Jackson. It is responsible for the state Highway Patrol (MHP) and commercial vehicle enforcement; specialized investigations and controlled drugs and substances enforcement; issuing driver's licenses and firearms permits; and the state Capitol Police.

== Organization ==
=== Highway Patrol ===
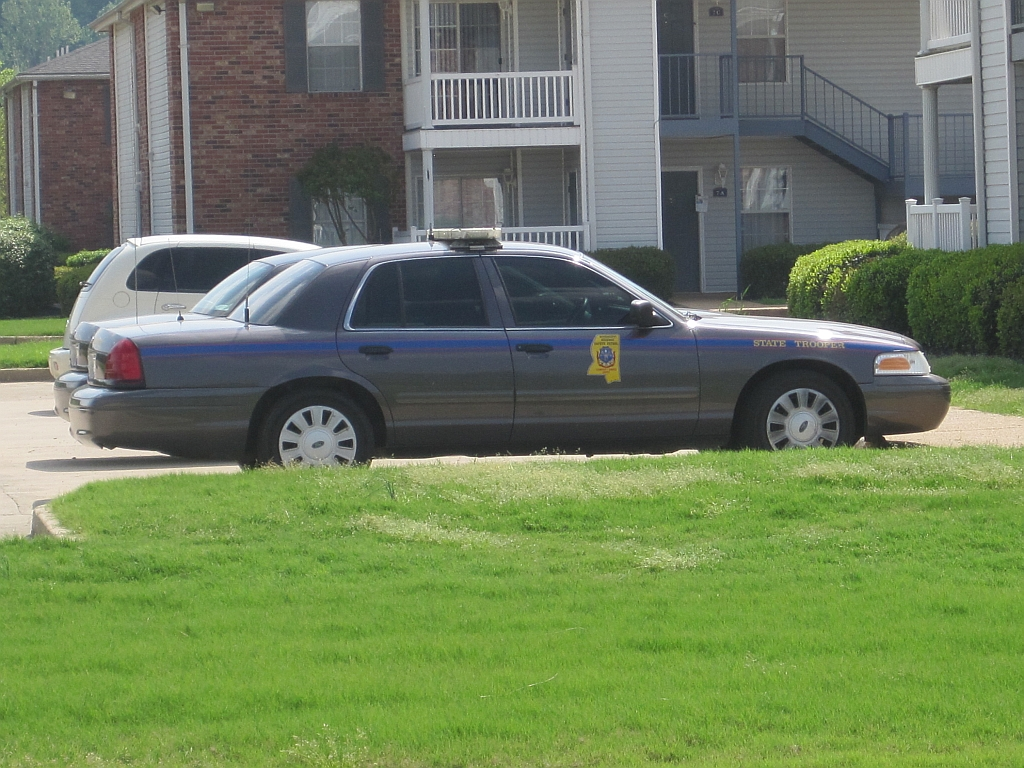
A Mississippi Highway Patrol car in 2012

The Mississippi Highway Patrol (MHP), formerly the Mississippi Highway Safety Patrol, is led by a director at the rank of colonel. The director also serves as assistant commissioner of the Department of Public Safety. The Highway Patrol is responsible for general policing on the Mississippi State Highway System, investigating major incidents through its Bureau of Investigations, issuing driver's licenses and firearms permits through its Driver Service Bureau, and some commercial vehicle enforcement.

==== Bureau of Investigations ====
The Bureau of Investigations is led by a Lieutenant Colonel of the Highway Safety Patrol, and its membership is composed of officers seconded from the Patrol. The Bureau is responsible for assisting local agencies in conducting complex investigations, maintaining the state Criminal Information Centre, investigating cases of human trafficking, inspecting salvage vehicles, operating the state's Victim Assistance Program, and providing executive protection to the Governor, Lieutenant Governor, and Speaker of the House. Since 2021, the Bureau has also been responsible for investigating police shootings in the state, with the exception of shootings involving members of the Highway Safety Patrol.

=== Bureau of Narcotics ===
The Bureau of Narcotics is an independent DPS agency responsible for enforcing regulations and legislation concerning the "abuse, misuse, sale, and trafficking of controlled substances." The Bureau is led by a director at the rank of colonel, appointed by the Commissioner of Public Safety.

=== Office of Capitol Police ===
The Office of Capitol Police is an independent DPS agency responsible for policing the Capitol Complex Improvement District (CCID), an 8.7 square mile area in Jackson; securing the Bolton state government buildings in Biloxi; and securing the State Service Centre in Hattiesburg.

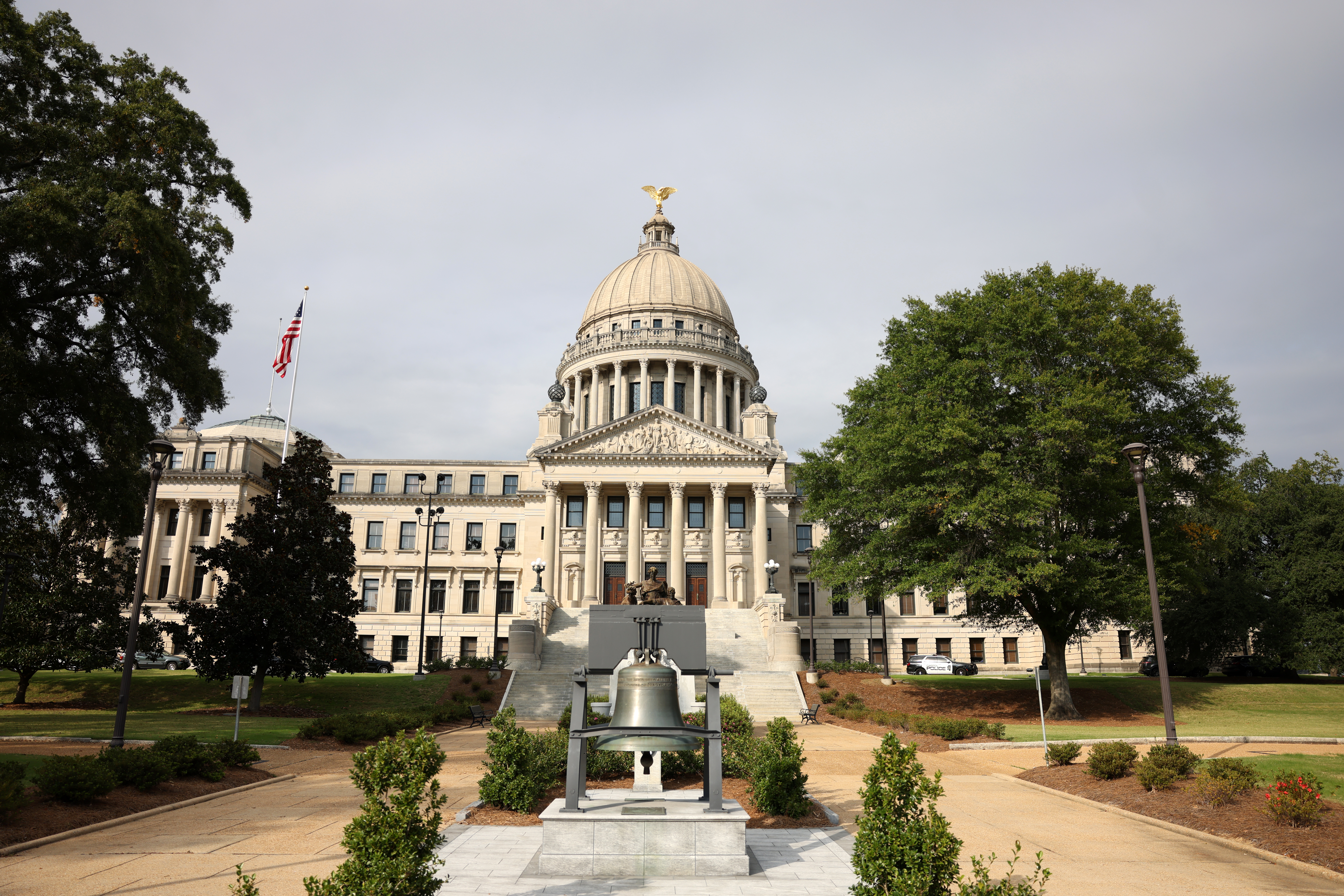
The Mississippi State Capitol in Jackson

In recent years, the Capitol Police's role expanded from providing security to the Capitol building and other government properties to becoming a second patrolling police force for many neighborhoods of Jackson, which already fall under the jurisdiction with the Jackson Police Department. Citing a want to better address crime in the city, Republicans in the State Legislature put forward HB 1020 to expand the CCID (and therefore the Capitol Police's jurisdiction) and create a separate court system with state-appointed judges and prosecutors. Democrat Mayor Chokwe Antar Lumumba responded that the law was "an attack on Black leadership in every form", and an example of "apartheid" given that those appointing policing and judicial officials for the CCID are white and most residents of Jackson are Black. In the first few months after starting its expanded patrols, Capitol Police officers had shot four people. In response to the outcry, the department updated its use of force policies which had not been reviewed since 2006—when the department still mostly functioned as building security for state government offices.

== History ==
The position of "Commissioner of Public Safety" was first created in 1938, with the establishment of the MHP.

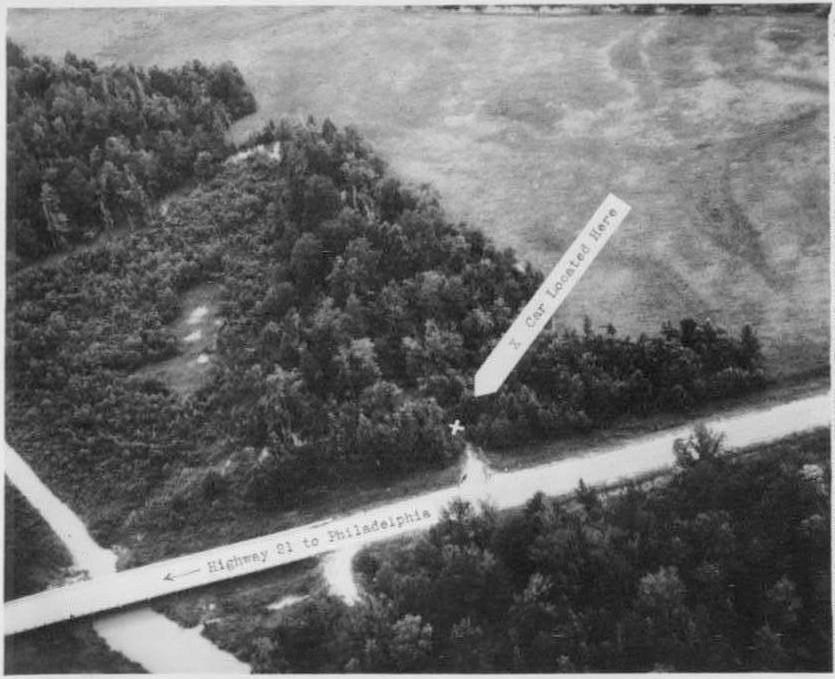
The location of the abandoned car near Chaney, Goodman, and Schwerner's burials in 1964, that an MHP officer disclosed to the FBI

=== Relationship with Black people and civil rights advocates ===
On June 21, 1964, in Neshoba County, the White Knights chapter of the Ku Klux Klan murdered James Chaney, Andrew Goodman, and Michael Schwerner, activists for Black civil rights. The Klansmen hid their bodies in a rural, wooded area; an MHP officer, Maynard King, somehow knew the location, and anonymously gave it to the investigating FBI. After the murders, Mississippi governor Paul B. Johnson Jr. fired two MHP officers for being Klan members, and MHP began to document Klan activities.

1960s-era items belonging to a Klan member or members were found in a closet in the DPS' headquarters in 2026. This included Klan propaganda; meeting notes; ledgers; recruitment materials; a list of various Klan members; a Klan outfit; charters of multiple chapters, including the White Knights; a "Kloran" for White Knights members, detailing the chapter's surveillance of Black people, especially Black voters; and newspaper clippings about the Freedom Riders, the DPS itself, and then-DPS Commissioner T.B. Birdsong. After these were found, DPS Commissioner Sean Tindell said that the DPS had "worked for decades with our federal law enforcement partners to shed light [on] groups like the Ku Klux Klan". The items were sent to the Mississippi state archives.

The Civil Rights Act of 1964 federally banned many forms of employment discrimination in the U.S. Years later, two Black men applied to become MHP officers: Willie Morrow and Jerome Magnum. They were denied the positions because they were Black, leading to civil rights Constance Slaugher-Harvey suing the DPS in 1970 for discrimination. A court found in 1972 that the DPS had engaged in "some" discrimination, and the DPS was forced to allow Black people to join the MHP. Later that year, three Black men integrated the MHP: Lewis Younger, R.O. Williams, and Walter Crosby.

A U.S. flag draped out of a window at Jackson State University's Alexander Hall, after it was broken during the 1970 Jackson State killings

In early 1970, there had been tensions between students at Jackson State College (later named Jackson State University), a historically black school, and some White residents who commuted to work along Jackson city's Lynch Street, who were getting into altercations with Black students at an intersection of the street next to Jackson State's Alexander Hall. On May 15, 1970, MHP officers and Jackson Police Department officers shot at a group of Black students at Alexander Hall, injuring several and killing two: Jackson State student Phillips Gibbs, and high school student James Green.

Robert Fair, a Black man, claimed in a 2023 piece for the Jackson Advocate that while he lived near Edwards, Hinds County, in the early 1970s, MHP officers would sometimes set up roadblocks on State Highway 22 around Edwards, to let White drivers pass through, and then stop Black drivers to harass them. Fair wrote that during one of these incidents in 1971, the officers beat him and other Black men, while calling them "nigger". Amidst this, an officer allegedly threatened to shoot him in the head. Fair claimed that after the Black men were arrested, one of the officers asked another: "What are we going to charge these niggers with?", then charged many or all of them with reckless driving.

=== 1971 expansion ===
The Department expanded in the early 1970s, when the Bureau of Narcotics was established in 1971 to conduct specialized enforcement and carry out investigations into the abuse, trafficking, manufacturing, and mishandling of controlled substances. Initially under the control of the State Board of Health, the Bureau of Narcotics was transferred over to the control of the Department of Public Safety in 1972.

=== 2021 expansion ===
In 2021, the Department expanded again, absorbing the Department of Transportation's enforcement division, which became the DPS' Commercial Transportation Enforcement Division and the Department of Finance and Administration's Capitol Police Office. The expansion also adjusted the duties of some DPS divisions: the Bureau of Investigation became responsible for investigating all police-involved shootings (excluding those involving a member of the Highway Safety Patrol); members of the Highway Safety Patrol became responsible for conducting speed enforcement operations and running radar on interstate highways within large cities; and the Office of Capitol Police's patrol area grew to include not just state government buildings but an 8.7 square mile swath of land including downtown Jackson, Jackson State University, the University of Mississippi Medical Center, and residential and commercial neighborhoods including a portion of Fondren, a "trendy enclave with a popular restaurant scene." Within this expanded patrol area, the Capitol Police acted as a force multiplier for the municipal Jackson Police Department, which had experienced prolonged staffing shortages.
