= Killing of George Robinson =

January 2019 police killing in Jackson, Mississippi

- Date: January 13, 2019
- Location: Jackson, Mississippi, US
- Suspects: Desmond Barney, Lincoln Lampley, and Anthony Fox
- Charges: Second-degree murder

On January 13, 2019, George Robinson, a 62-year-old Black man, died two days after a violent arrest by three Black police officers in Jackson, Mississippi. According to a grand jury indictment, the officers pulled Robinson out of a car, threw him headfirst into the pavement, and struck and kicked him multiple times in the head and chest. Robinson was treated at the scene but within hours lost consciousness and later died at a hospital. The state coroner ruled the death a homicide.

After an internal Jackson Police Department investigation cleared the officers of wrongdoing, one of the officers continued working for the Jackson Police Department, and the other two were hired by a police department in a nearby town. Following the George Floyd protests a year later, as well as a lengthy grand jury review, all three officers were indicted for second-degree murder on August 5, 2020.

== People involved ==
George Robinson was a 62-year-old Black man.

Desmond Barney, 31 years old as of August 2020, Lincoln Lampley, 33, and Anthony Fox, 35, also Black, were officers in the Jackson Police Department's K-9 unit at the time of the killing. As of August 2020, Lampley is still an officer with the Jackson Police Department, and Barney and Fox are police officers in nearby Clinton, Mississippi. Anthony Fox is not be confused with the two time top cop Eric B. Fox, who is a 24 year veteran of the Jackson Police Department.

== Death ==
According to prosecutors, on January 13, 2019, Barney, Lampley, and Fox were canvassing in a predominantly Black neighborhood in Jackson, Mississippi, looking for suspects in the fatal robbery of a pastor hours earlier. The officers saw Robinson sitting in his car in front of his house and approached him because they thought they had seen him dealing drugs earlier. They ordered him to exit his vehicle, but Robinson, a stroke victim, was slow to comply. According to the indictment, the officers pulled Robinson from his car, threw him headfirst onto the pavement, and struck and kicked him multiple times in the head and chest. The responding ambulance treated Robinson at the scene and released him. The officers arrested Robinson on misdemeanor charges of failing to obey a police officer and resisting arrest before releasing him with instructions to appear at a future court date. Within hours, Robinson's girlfriend saw him losing consciousness and called for another ambulance. Robinson died at a hospital on January 15.

The state coroner ruled the death a homicide. The coroner's report and other medical reports stated that Robinson died from blunt force trauma to the head and bleeding from the brain, and that he had several broken ribs.

Two other men were later arrested for the pastor's murder.

== Prosecution ==
The three officers were placed on paid administrative leave while the Jackson Police Department's internal affairs division and the Federal Bureau of Investigation investigated, and were later reinstated. After the Jackson Police Department's internal affairs division cleared the officers of wrongdoing and "multiple agencies looked into the incident and advised that no criminal conduct occurred", Barney and Fox were hired by the police department of nearby Clinton, Mississippi, according to Clinton's mayor. Lampley continued to be employed by the Jackson Police Department.

On August 5, 2020, all three officers were indicted for second-degree murder. The three officers posted bond and were freed pending trial. Lampley was placed on desk duty by the Jackson Police Department, and Barney and Fox were "assigned other duties" at the Clinton Police Department.

On May 20, 2021 all charges against Barney and Lampley were dismissed in a rare "directed verdict". The charges were dismissed with prejudice, an outcome welcomed by the Clinton Police Department.

Robinson's family has filed a civil suit against the city, the three police officers, and the ambulance company that treated Robinson at the scene and released him. The civil suit was settled with no admission or finding of liability by the officers.

On August 4, 2022, Fox was found guilty of culpable negligence manslaughter. On August 17 he was sentenced to five years in prison. Fox's conviction was overturned on January 30, 2024, due to his attorneys' successfully arguing that there was insufficient credible evidence to convict Fox in Robinson's death.

== Impact ==
A march was held shortly after Robinson's death.

According to The New York Times, the officers were charged "amid intense scrutiny of police brutality after the killing in May of George Floyd in the custody of the Minneapolis police". United Press International reported, "The indictment comes as police departments across the country consider reforms in policing in the wake of protests against excessive force and racial bias." However, Jackson Mayor Chokwe Antar Lumumba stated that the indictment of the three police officers actually built on a police accountability policy the city adopted in October 2018 which requires all cases of people who died in the custody of the Jackson police to be turned over the district attorney for a grand jury review.

== See also ==
- List of unarmed African Americans killed by law enforcement officers in the United States
- Lists of killings by law enforcement officers in the United States
