= Jackson Police Department (Mississippi) =

Coordinates: 32.296940°N 90.183748°W

- Jackson Police Patch
- Abbreviation: JPD

Agency overview
- Formed: 1822

Jurisdictional structure
- Operations jurisdiction: Mississippi, United States
- Map of Jackson Police Department's Jurisdiction.
- Area: 122 sq mi (320 km^{2})
- Population: 175,000
- Legal jurisdiction: Hinds County portion of Jackson, Mississippi, U.S.
- Governing body: Jackson, Mississippi
- General nature: Local civilian police

Operational structure
- Headquarters: 327 East Pascagoula Street; Jackson, Mississippi, U.S.
- Police officers: 275 (2024)
- Unsworn members: 170
- Agency executive: Tyree Jones, Chief of Police

Facilities
- Precincts: 4

Website
- www.jacksonms.gov/departments/jackson-police-department/

The Jackson Police Department (JPD) provides law enforcement to approximately 175,000 residents within the 120-square-mile (310 km^{2}) Hinds County portion of Jackson, Mississippi, United States. It was reported that JPD had 335 sworn officers in 2019, and 225 in 2023.

== History ==
The Jackson Police Department was founded in 1822, one year after the founding of city. In 1873, badges and uniforms were provided to officers, and in 1878, the department assigned its first specialized officer, a "first detective". Specialized units to follow were patrol officers and desk sergeants. A training academy was established in 1965, and the first female officer was hired in 1972. In 2006, Shirlen Anderson was appointed the first female chief.

The department was accredited for the first time by the Mississippi Law Enforcement Accreditation Commission in 2016. At that time, JPD was the largest of 27 police departments accredited in Mississippi.

In 2020, JPD opened a Real-Time Crime Center, where officers could access 600 public and private surveillance cameras in the city. In 2025, the center continued to struggle compared to similar facilities around the U.S. Rarely ever was it staffed or capable of using the technology leaders claimed to be used.

In 2023, NPR reported that Jackson's homicide rate in 2021 was about 14 times the national rate, and "the under-staffed Jackson Police Department has struggled to keep up with 30 thousand calls for service per month" and a "stubborn crime problem". In response, the state legislature in 2023 expanded the jurisdiction of the Mississippi Capitol Police into an 8.7-square-mile (23 km^{2}) area in Jackson called the Capitol Complex Improvement Zone, an area with a larger white population than the rest of the city. Jackson's mayor Chokwe Antar Lumumba described the increased policing in this area as "apartheid".

=== Jackson State killings ===
On May 15, 1970, during a period of student unrest over the Vietnam War and other issues, officers with the Jackson Police and the Mississippi Highway Safety Patrol opened fire with more than 150 rounds of "shotgun, carbine, rifle, and submachine gun fire", including armor-piercing bullets, on a women's dormitory at Jackson State College, killing Phillip Gibbs, a prelaw major, and James Green, a local high school student, and injuring 12 others. A federal commission found the response "unreasonable, unjustified" and "clearly unwarranted", and that the Jackson officers then engaged in a "pattern of deceit", with each officer falsely claiming he had not fired a shot, until shells collected by the highway patrol were surrendered under federal grand jury order, and FBI laboratory tests confirmed that they had been fired by city police shotguns.

== Notable people ==
Frank Melton (born 1954), former mayor of Jackson.

Eric B. Fox (born 1981), recipient of 11 commendations, more than any other police officer in the State of Mississippi.

== Rank structure ==
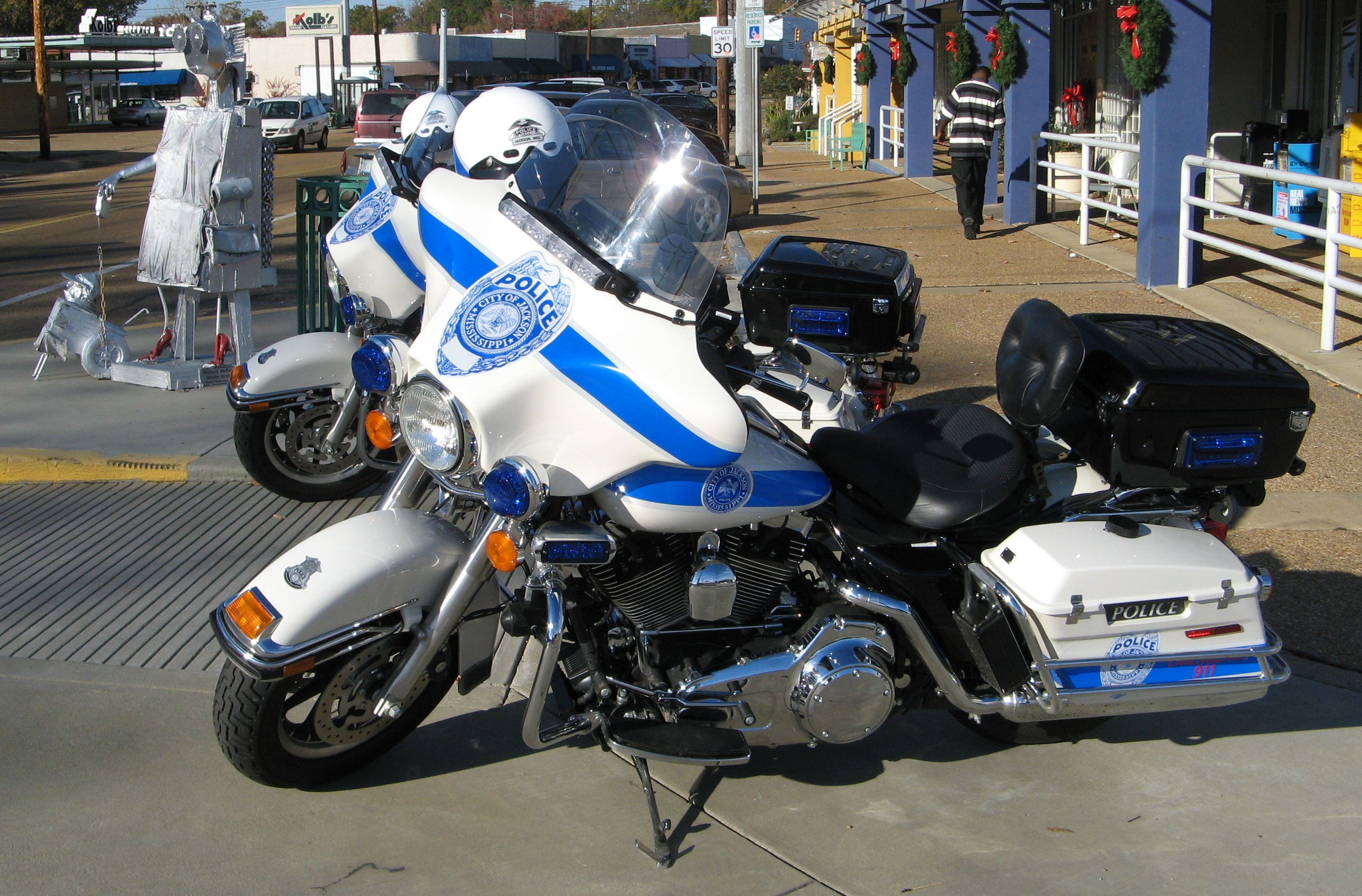
Motorcycles

Title	Insignia
Chief of Police	
Assistant Chief	
Deputy Chief	
Captain	
Lieutenant	
Sergeant	
Corporal	
Officer	
Recruit	

== Duty related fatalities ==
Since 1893, 18 officers have died in the line of duty, all male.

Duty related fatalities
Decade	Gunfire	Motorcycle crash	Struck by vehicle	Total
2010-19	2		1	3
2000-09	1			1
1990-99	4	1		5
1980-89	2			2
1970-79	1		1	2
1960-69	1	1		2
1900-09	1			1
1890-99	2			2

== See also ==
- Killing of George Robinson
- List of law enforcement agencies in Mississippi
