= Madison County Sheriff's Office (Mississippi) =

Coordinates: 32.587202°N 90.044777°W

The Madison County Sheriff's Department provides the primary law enforcement service for approximately 800 square miles (2,100 km^{2}) of Madison County, Mississippi. The Sheriff's Department has jurisdiction county wide; however, the municipalities of Canton, Flora, Madison and Ridgeland have concurrent jurisdiction within their respective city limits. The patrol division provides 24-hour law enforcement services to the county.

== Authority ==
Mississippi state law, through the Law Enforcement Board of Minimum Standards, governs the minimum level of training for certified law enforcement officers. Before assuming a sworn position, each officer must be state-certified by a certified law enforcement academy.

== Controversy ==
The department was subject to a class-action lawsuit filed by the American Civil Liberties Union alleging practices of excessive force, racial profiling, and unconstitutional practices including forcing confessions. The ALCU alleged that blacks are 5 times more likely to be stopped and arrested than whites in the county, despite having a similar population. Sheriff Tucker reportedly denied these allegations, but as of May 2017, the lawsuit is ongoing in U.S. District Court in Jackson, Mississippi.
