= 2015 Mississippi's 1st congressional district special election =

- June 2, 2015 (runoff); May 12, 2015 (blanket)

Mississippi's 1st congressional district
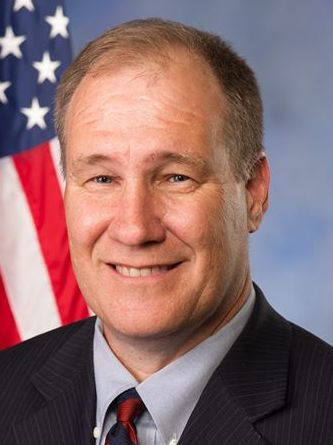

Nominee	Trent Kelly	Walter Zinn
Party	Republican	Democratic
Popular vote	69,516	29,831
Percentage	69.97%	30.03%
- Runoff county results Kelly: 50–60% 60–70% 70–80% 80–90% Zinn: 50–60%
U.S. Representative before election
Alan Nunnelee
Republican
Elected U.S. Representative
Trent Kelly
Republican

A special election for Mississippi's 1st congressional district was held on May 12, 2015, to fill the term left by the vacancy created by the death of Alan Nunnelee. Nunnelee, a member of the Republican Party, died on February 6, 2015.

According to Mississippi state law, Governor Phil Bryant had to call the special election within 60 days of Nunnelee's death, and had to be held at least 60 days after the call. Prospective candidates had to submit a petition for ballot access consisting of at least 1,000 signatures of qualified Mississippi voters with the office of the Secretary of State of Mississippi at least 45 days before the election.

The election was won by Republican Trent Kelly.

== Election format ==
All candidates ran together on the same primary ballot, irrespective of party affiliation. As no candidate received a majority of the vote, a runoff was held on June 2 between Trent Kelly (R) and Walter Zinn (D), the top two finishers.

== Candidates ==
- Note: Special elections in Mississippi are nonpartisan. Party identification is for informational purposes only.

=== Republican Party ===
==== Declared ====
- Boyce Adams, nominee for the Northern District of the Mississippi Public Service Commission in 2011
- Sam Adcock, businessman
- Nancy Adams Collins, state senator
- Ed "Doc" Holliday, dentist
- Starner Jones, emergency room physician
- Trent Kelly, (Lee, Pontotoc, Alcorn, Monroe, Itawamba, Prentiss and Tishomingo Counties) District Attorney
- Chip Mills, Itawamba County Prosecutor
- Greg Pirkle, attorney and son of Estus Pirkle
- Henry Ross, former mayor of Eupora and candidate for the seat in 2010 and 2012
- Daniel Sparks, attorney
- Mike Tagert, Northern District Commissioner of the Mississippi Department of Transportation
- Quentin Whitwell, former Jackson City Councilman

==== Withdrew ====
- Chris Brown, state representative

==== Declined ====
- Lynn Fitch, Mississippi State Treasurer
- Merle Flowers, former state senator
- Tommy Irwin, mayor of Corinth
- Chip Johnson, mayor of Hernando
- James Maxwell, judge on the Mississippi Court of Appeals
- Brad Mayo, state representative
- Glenn McCullough, former mayor of Tupelo, former chairman of the Tennessee Valley Authority and candidate for the seat in 2008
- Mandy McGrevey Gunasekara, counsel for the United States Senate Committee on Environment and Public Works
- Joseph Murray, attorney and author
- Tori Nunnelee, widow of former Congressman Alan Nunnelee
- John Oxford, director of Corporate Communication for Renasant Bank
- David Parker, state senator
- Amanda Tollison, attorney
- Gray Tollison, state senator
- Amy Tuck, former Lieutenant Governor of Mississippi
- Todd Wade, former NFL player

=== Democratic Party ===
==== Declared ====
- Walter Zinn, attorney and political aide

==== Declined ====
- Hob Bryan, state senator
- Travis Childers, former U.S. Representative and nominee for the U.S. Senate in 2014
- Steve Holland, state representative
- Eric Powell, former state senator
- Brandon Presley, Public Service Commissioner and former mayor of Nettleton (ran for re-election)
- Scott Ross, former mayor of West Point
- Jason Shelton, Mayor of Tupelo

=== Libertarian Party ===
==== Did Not File ====
- Danny Bedwell, businessman and Libertarian nominee for the seat in 2012 and 2014

== General election ==
=== Predictions ===
Source	Ranking	As of
The Cook Political Report	Solid R	May 1, 2015
Inside Elections	Solid R	March 6, 2015

=== Fundraising ===
Campaign Finance Reports through April 22
Candidate	Raised	Spent	Cash on Hand	Debt
Boyce Adams	$358,918	$304,876	$54,041	$245,408
Sam Adcock	$241,033	$123,769	$117,263	$120,000
Nancy Collins	$198,421	$163,465	$34,956	$141,983
Ed Holliday	$121,165	$46,903	$58,521	$100,000
Starner Jones	$385,901	$327,233	$58,667	$350,000
Trent Kelly	$117,703	$60,553	$57,150	$0
Chip Mills	$119,250	$100,351	$18,898	$30,000
Greg Pirkle	$291,010	$144,424	$146,585	$100,000
Henry Ross	$92,388	$33,390	$58,696	$115,911
Daniel Sparks	$27,100	$15,977	$11,123	$8,617
Mike Tagert	$371,965	$245,392	$126,572	$0
Quentin Whitwell	$119,965	$95,187	$24,727	$0
Walter Zinn	$11,552	$8,794	$2,752	$0
Source: Federal Election Commission

=== Results ===
Zinn: 10–20%; 20–30%; 30–40%; 40–50%; Kelly: 20–30%; 30–40%; Tagert: 10–20%; 20–30%; 30–40%; Pirkle: 40–50%; Jones: 20–30%; Mills: 50–60%; Ross: 30–40%; Adams: 20–30%; Holliday: 30–40%; Sparks: 40–50%

2015 Mississippi's 1st congressional district special election
Party	Candidate	Votes	%
Nonpartisan	Walter Zinn	15,385	17.41
Nonpartisan	Trent Kelly	14,418	16.32
Nonpartisan	Mike Tagert	11,231	12.71
Nonpartisan	Greg Pirkle	7,142	8.08
Nonpartisan	Starner Jones	6,993	7.91
Nonpartisan	Chip Mills	6,929	7.84
Nonpartisan	Henry Ross	4,313	4.88
Nonpartisan	Boyce Adams	4,037	4.57
Nonpartisan	Nancy Adams Collins	4,006	4.53
Nonpartisan	Sam Adcock	4,000	4.53
Nonpartisan	Ed "Doc" Holliday	3,958	4.48
Nonpartisan	Quentin Whitwell	3,124	3.56
Nonpartisan	Daniel Sparks	2,828	3.20
Total votes		88,364	100.0

== Runoff election ==
=== Predictions ===
Source	Ranking	As of
The Cook Political Report	Solid R	May 15, 2015

=== Fundraising ===
Campaign Finance Reports through May 15
Candidate	Raised	Spent	Cash on Hand	Debt
Trent Kelly	$145,843	$123,618	$22,225	$0
Walter Zinn	$19,056	$23,597	$(4,540)	$0
Source: Federal Election Commission

=== Polling ===
Poll source	Date(s) administered	Sample size	Margin of error	Trent Kelly (R)	Walter Zinn (D)	Undecided
Gravis Marketing	May 28, 2015	509	± 4%	54%	37%	9%

=== Results ===
2015 Mississippi's 1st congressional district special runoff election
Party	Candidate	Votes	%
Nonpartisan	Trent Kelly	69,516	69.97
Nonpartisan	Walter Zinn	29,831	30.03
Total votes		99,347	100.00
Republican hold			

==== By county ====
County	Trent Kelly Republican		Walter Zinn Democratic		Margin		Total
County	#	%	#	%	#	%	Total
Alcorn	2,841	79.25%	744	20.75%	2,097	58.49%	3,585
Benton	696	62.14%	424	37.86%	272	24.29%	1,120
Calhoun	1,820	72.57%	688	27.43%	1,132	45.14%	2,508
Chickasaw	1,967	52.18%	1,803	47.82%	164	4.35%	3,770
Choctaw	1,141	75.12%	378	24.88%	763	50.23%	1,519
Clay	2,092	46.50%	2,407	53.50%	-315	-7.00%	4,499
DeSoto	9,764	78.31%	2,704	21.69%	7,060	56.62%	12,468
Itawamba	3,127	88.53%	405	11.47%	2,722	77.07%	3,532
Lafayette	3,338	58.16%	2,401	41.84%	937	16.33%	5,739
Lee	10,723	73.64%	3,839	26.36%	6,884	47.27%	14,562
Lowndes	5,283	63.38%	3,052	36.62%	2,231	26.77%	8,335
Marshall	1,932	46.13%	2,256	53.87%	-324	-7.74%	4,188
Monroe	4,116	64.27%	2,288	35.73%	1,828	28.54%	6,404
Oktibbeha (part)	320	64.26%	178	35.74%	142	28.51%	498
Pontotoc	4,038	72.74%	1,513	27.26%	2,525	45.49%	5,551
Prentiss	2,528	77.83%	720	22.17%	1,808	55.67%	3,248
Tate	2,041	71.82%	801	28.18%	1,240	43.63%	2,842
Tippah	2,472	80.26%	608	19.74%	1,864	60.52%	3,080
Tishomingo	2,026	84.88%	361	15.12%	1,665	69.75%	2,387
Union	3,663	81.96%	806	18.04%	2,857	63.93%	4,469
Webster	1,728	86.23%	276	13.77%	1,452	72.46%	2,004
Winston	1,860	61.20%	1,179	38.80%	681	22.41%	3,039
Totals	69,516	69.97%	29,831	30.03%	39,685	39.95%	99,347
