= 2014 United States Senate election in Mississippi =

- November 4, 2014
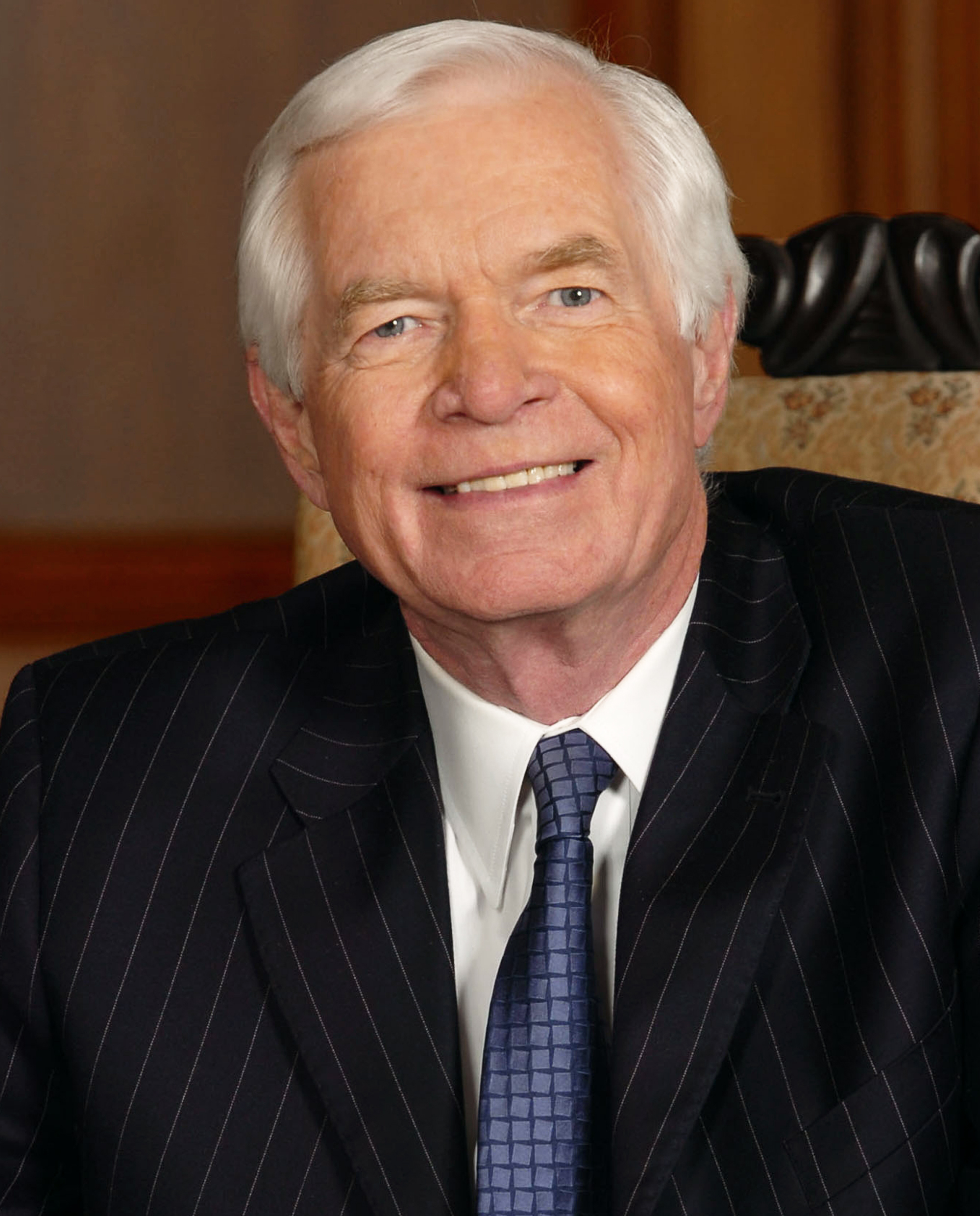

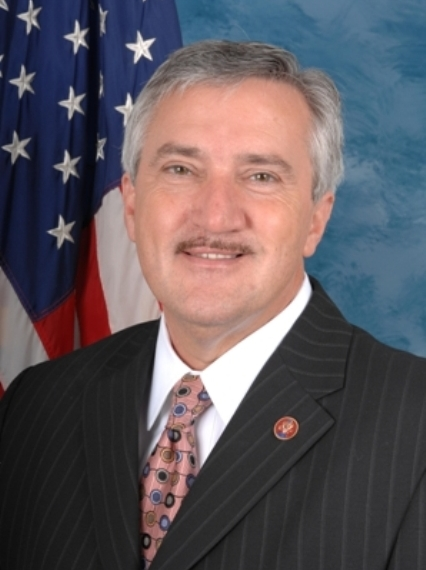
Nominee	Thad Cochran	Travis Childers
Party	Republican	Democratic
Popular vote	378,481	239,439
Percentage	59.90%	37.89%
- Cochran: 50–60% 60–70% 70–80% Childers: 40–50% 50–60% 60–70% 70–80%
U.S. senator before election
Thad Cochran
Republican
Elected U.S. Senator
Thad Cochran
Republican

The 2014 United States Senate election in Mississippi was held on November 4, 2014, to elect a member of the United States Senate. Incumbent Republican Senator Thad Cochran, first elected in 1978, ran for re-election to a seventh term. Primary elections were held on June 3, 2014.

The election was notable for the contentious Republican primary between Cochran and a Tea Party-backed challenger, Chris McDaniel. After neither Cochran nor McDaniel received 50% of the vote in the primary, a runoff election was held on June 24, 2014. After narrowly defeating McDaniel in the runoff, Cochran defeated Democratic nominee Travis Childers, a former congressman, with nearly 60% of the vote. It was Cochran's weakest Senate election since his initial 1978 victory, and his weakest re-election.

== Background ==
Thad Cochran was first elected to the Senate with a plurality of the vote in a three-way race in 1978. He was reelected with at least 61% of the vote in 1984, 1990, 1996, 2002, and 2008.

Cochran was the last incumbent senator up for reelection in 2014 to declare whether he would run, causing widespread speculation that he would retire. Despite being urged to declare his intentions, Cochran said in August 2013, "I don't have a fixed date. But [I will decide] by the end of the year. You don't want to rush into these things." On November 12, he announced that he would reveal his plans by the end of the month. On December 6, he confirmed that he would run.

Cochran's fundraising ability, powerful Senate committee assignments, and very high approval ratings meant that he was considered "unbeatable". Mississippi Democratic Party Chairman Rickey Cole said that "in the very likely event that he does [run], we don't foresee a major Democratic challenger emerging." Had he chosen to retire, a "stampede" was predicted in the Republican primary and Democrats believed that a "properly positioned" candidate could have been competitive in the general election.

== Republican primary ==
The United States Senate Republican primary election in Mississippi took place on June 3, 2014. Incumbent Republican Senator Thad Cochran, who had served in the position since 1978, ran for reelection to a seventh term. He was challenged for the nomination by State Senator Chris McDaniel, a Tea Party supporter, and Thomas Carey. Cochran and McDaniel received 49.0% and 49.5% of the vote, respectively. Since no candidate won a majority, a June 24 runoff election ensued.

Cochran defeated McDaniel in the runoff, 51% to 49%. Controversially, Cochran's campaign invited Democrats to vote in the runoff.

=== Primary campaign ===
Chris McDaniel declared his candidacy on October 17, 2013. He was immediately endorsed by the Club for Growth and Jim DeMint's Senate Conservatives Fund. McDaniel was initially thought to have no chance of beating Cochran in the primary, as summed up by the Jackson Free Press, who remarked that if McDaniel challenged Cochran, it would be the "beginning of [the] end of [his] political career". Republican lobbyist Henry Barbour, the nephew of former governor Haley Barbour, said: "I think he will get his head handed to him, and that will be what he deserves. [But] it's a free country." Rather, McDaniel was believed to have declared his candidacy in the hope that Cochran wouldn't run, so that he could get "first crack" at the support of Tea Party groups and donors ahead of a competitive primary.

Although the race was initially considered uncompetitive, McDaniel proved a serious challenger. Polling showed the lead swinging between the two and it eventually became a "50%-50% race".

The race was considered a marquee establishment-versus-Tea Party fight and significant because Mississippi is the poorest state and Cochran's seniority and appropriating skills contrasted with the junior status of the rest of the state's congressional delegation. McDaniel was endorsed by politicians including Sarah Palin and Rick Santorum and organizations including Citizens United, Club for Growth, FreedomWorks, Madison Project, National Association for Gun Rights, Senate Conservatives Fund and Tea Party Express. By contrast, the Republican establishment rallied around Cochran, who was endorsed by the NRA Political Victory Fund and National Right to Life.

The race was described as "nasty" and full of "bizarre" twists. McDaniel's campaign attacked Cochran for being "an out-of-touch, big-spending Washington insider" and Cochran's replied that "McDaniel's voting record in the state Senate does not match his conservative rhetoric." Each side accused the other of distortions and outright lies.

Cochran ran on his incumbency, seniority and the fact that he would become the Chairman of the Senate Appropriations Committee if the Republicans retook control of the Senate. In addition to ideological differences, the race also highlighted geographic divides in the state Republican Party.

=== Tea Party blogger scandal ===
In May 2014, a scandal emerged when Clayton Thomas Kelly, a McDaniel supporter, allegedly entered a nursing home where Cochran's bedridden wife was living and took pictures of her. Kelly posted the images as part of a video on his blog, intending to advance the rumor that Cochran was having affairs while his wife was receiving care. Four people were arrested in connection with the incident. The connection to the McDaniel campaign was disputed. One of the arrested included McDaniel ally Mark Mayfield, who was vice chairman of the state's Tea Party. In response, McDaniel said, "the violation of the privacy of Mrs. Cochran [was] out of bounds for politics and reprehensible."

=== Racism scandal ===
External image
- The Tea Party Intends To Prevent You From Voting. Several ads such as this one invoked claims of racism. Several ads of a similar nature were distributed via Twitter and resulted in a request for censure in front of the National GOP. Photo provided via The Hill (newspaper).

A second scandal emerged during the primary when pro-Cochran ads appealed to African American voters by suggesting that Tea Party efforts to prevent Democrats from voting were racially motivated. Charges first surfaced that a small group of elderly Democratic women activists calling themselves Citizens for Progress were behind the controversy, but later facts as well as money trails show that money exchanged hands multiple times between Citizens for Progress and Mississippi Conservatives PAC.

After the fallout of the primary election, Missouri Republican Party chairman Ed Martin wrote an op-ed calling for the censure of Henry Barbour for his role in the funding of the advertisements. He also called for Barbour's censure at an RNC summer meeting in Chicago.

Senator Ted Cruz appeared on the Mark Levin Show to discuss the Mississippi primary. He called for an investigation, saying, "the ads they ran were racially charged false attacks".

=== Primary election results ===
Results by county Cochran: 40–50%; 50–60%; 60–70%; 70–80%; McDaniel: 40–50%; 50–60%; 60–70%; 70–80%; 80–90%

The presence of a third candidate, Thomas Carey, opened the possibility that neither Cochran nor McDaniel would win a majority. Indeed, no candidate did, so a runoff between McDaniel and Cochran was required, and was held on June 24. The runoff was generally seen as advantageous to McDaniel.

Republican primary results
Party	Candidate	Votes	%
Republican	Chris McDaniel	157,733	49.46%
Republican	Thad Cochran (incumbent)	156,315	49.02%
Republican	Thomas Carey	4,854	1.52%
Total votes		318,902	100.00%

After the election, the Hinds County Sheriff's Office announced it was investigating three McDaniel supporters who were locked inside the local courthouse, where primary ballots were held, on election night. It was later reported that the supporters would face no criminal charges.

==== Runoff election ====
Results by county Cochran: 50–60%; 60–70%; 70–80%; 80–90%; McDaniel: 50–60%; 60–70%; 70–80%; 80–90%

The runoff was scheduled for June 24, three weeks after the primary. Despite trailing in most of the polls, Cochran won with 51% of the vote to McDaniel's 49%. McDaniel once again won big in his native Pine Belt and in the heavily populated suburban Memphis DeSoto County, but Cochran got a surge in votes from African Americans who took advantage of the mixed primary. Many credited Cochran's win to the increase in black voters. Cochran won by 3,532 votes in the most Democratic, African-American precincts in Hinds County (the state's largest county, and home to Jackson). These precincts made up nearly half of Cochran's margin of victory.

Republican primary runoff results
Party	Candidate	Votes	%	±%
Republican	Thad Cochran (incumbent)	194,932	51.00%	+1.98%
Republican	Chris McDaniel	187,265	49.00%	−0.46%
Total votes		382,197	100.00%	0.00%

=== Endorsements ===
Thad Cochran

U.S. senators

- John McCain, U.S. senator from Arizona
- Olympia Snowe, former U.S. senator from Maine
- Roger Wicker, U.S. senator

U.S. representatives

- Gregg Harper, U.S. representative
- Alan Nunnelee, U.S. representative

U.S. governors

- Phil Bryant, governor of Mississippi

Statewide officeholders

- Delbert Hosemann, secretary of state of Mississippi
- Stacey E. Pickering, state auditor of Mississippi
- Tate Reeves, lieutenant governor of Mississippi

Organizations

- National Right to Life
- NRA Political Victory Fund
Chris McDaniel

U.S. senators

- Rick Santorum, former U.S. senator from Pennsylvania, candidate for 2012 Republican presidential nomination

U.S. representatives

- Ron Paul, former U.S. representative from Texas, candidate for 2012 presidential nomination

U.S. governors

- Sarah Palin, former governor of Alaska, Republican vice-presidential candidate in 2008

Mississippi state legislators

- Philip Gandy, state senator
- Angela Hill, state senator
- Billy Hudson, state senator
- Chris Massey, state senator
- David Parker, state senator
- Dannie Reed, former state representative
- Tony Smith, state senator
- Melanie Sojourner, state senator
- Michael Watson, state senator
- Lee Yancey, former state senator

Local officeholders

- Hal Marx, mayor of Petal, Mississippi

Individuals

- Bryan Fischer, host of the American Family Radio talk show Focal Point
- Allen Hamilton, chairman of the Mississippi Federation of College Republicans
- Michael Kelly, police chief of Seminary
- Mark Levin, The Mark Levin Show
- Donald Trump, businessman and television personality

Organizations

- Citizens United
- Club for Growth
- FreedomWorks
- Madison Project
- National Association for Gun Rights
- Senate Conservatives Fund
- Tea Party Express
- Young Americans for Liberty

Media

- Mississippi Gun News
- Right Wing News

== Democratic primary ==
Former Congressman Travis Childers had stated that he was interested in running, particularly if Cochran retired. With Cochran facing a competitive primary, Childers announced in February 2014 that he was running. Childers won the Democratic primary with 74% of the vote.

=== Candidates ===
==== Declared ====
- Travis Childers, former U.S. representative
- William Bond Compton Jr., candidate for governor of Mississippi in 2007 and 2011
- Bill Marcy, former police officer and Republican nominee for the 2nd congressional district in 2010 and 2012
- Jonathan Rawl

==== Declined ====
- David Baria, state representative
- Jim Hood, Mississippi attorney general
- Bill Luckett, mayor of Clarksdale and candidate for governor in 2011
- Ray Mabus, U.S. secretary of the Navy and former governor of Mississippi
- Connie Moran, mayor of Ocean Springs
- Ronnie Musgrove, former governor of Mississippi and nominee for the U.S. Senate in 2008
- Brandon Presley, commissioner for the Northern District of the Mississippi Public Service Commission
- Gene Taylor, former U.S. representative
- Bennie Thompson, U.S. representative

==== Results ====
Primary results by county: Childers—>90% Childers—80–90% Childers—70–80% Childers—60–70% Childers—50–60% Childers—40–50%

Democratic primary results
Party	Candidate	Votes	%
Democratic	Travis Childers	63,548	73.9%
Democratic	Bill Marcy	10,361	12.1%
Democratic	William Compton	8,465	9.9%
Democratic	Jonathan Rawl	3,492	4.1%
Total votes		85,866	100.0%

== General election ==
=== Campaign ===
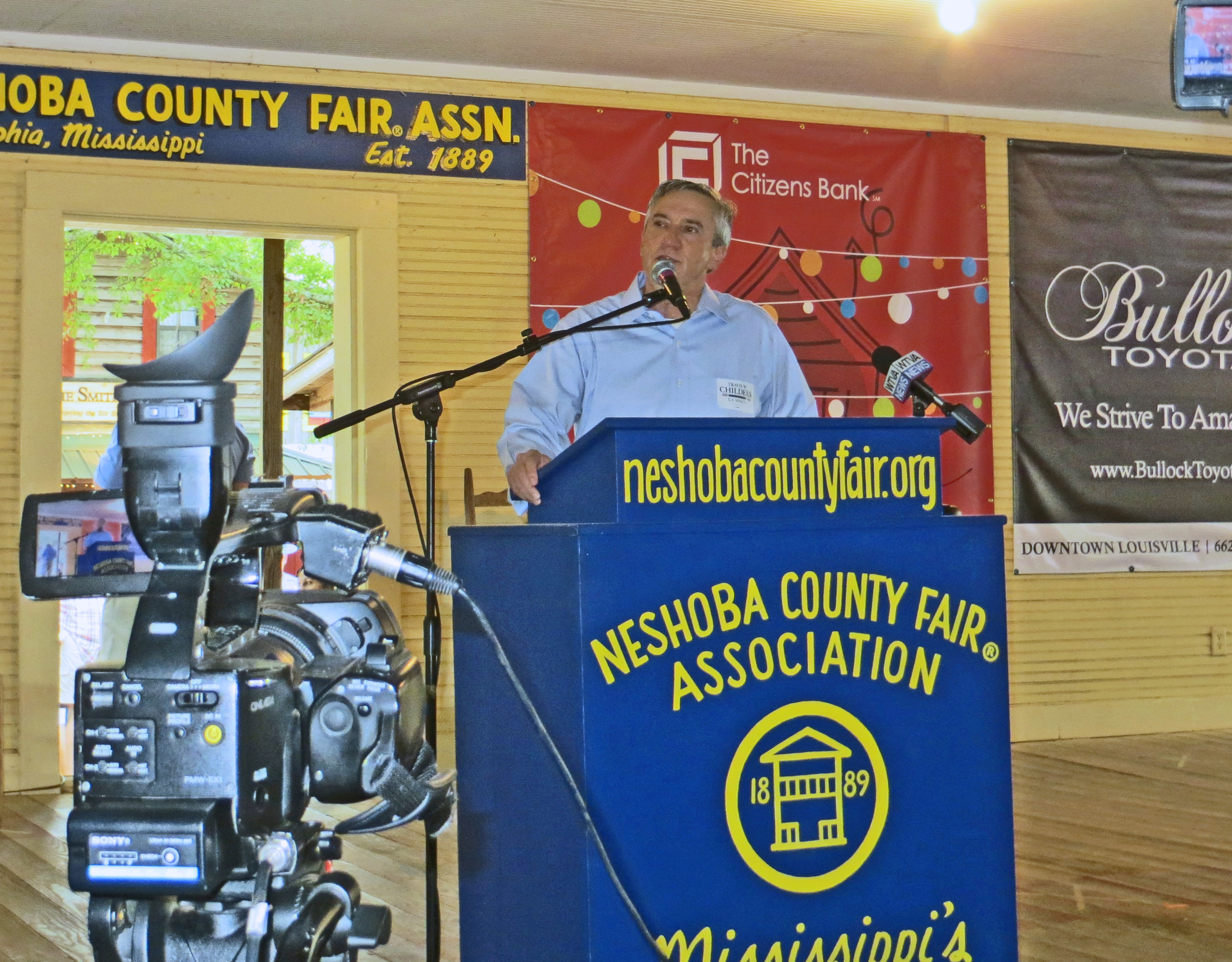
Childers campaigning for Senate

Childers described himself as a "moderate to conservative" Democrat, highlighting his vote against the Patient Protection and Affordable Care Act and his opposition to new gun-control measures, abortion and same-sex marriage.

=== Predictions ===
Source	Ranking	As of
The Cook Political Report	Likely R	November 3, 2014
Sabato's Crystal Ball	Safe R	November 3, 2014
Rothenberg Political Report	Safe R	November 3, 2014
Real Clear Politics	Likely R	November 3, 2014

=== Polling ===
Poll source	Date(s) administered	Sample size	Margin of error	Thad Cochran (R)	Travis Childers (D)	Other	Undecided
Public Policy Polling	November 15–17, 2013	502	± 4.4%	50%	33%	—	17%
Rasmussen Reports	March 26–29, 2014	750	± 4%	48%	31%	9%	12%
Rasmussen Reports	June 25–26, 2014	750	± 4%	46%	34%	10%	9%
Public Policy Polling	July 10–13, 2014	691	± 3.7%	40%	24%	5%	31%
Public Policy Polling	July 10–13, 2014	691	± 3.7%	41%	26%	—	33%
CBS News/NYT/YouGov	July 5–24, 2014	850	± 5.7%	47%	32%	17%	5%
CBS News/NYT/YouGov	August 18 – September 2, 2014	976	± 4%	46%	31%	9%	15%
CBS News/NYT/YouGov	September 20 – October 1, 2014	826	± 4%	46%	35%	3%	16%
CBS News/NYT/YouGov	October 16–23, 2014	654	± 7%	50%	28%	2%	20%

Hypothetical polling

With Cochran

Poll source	Date(s) administered	Sample size	Margin of error	Thad Cochran (R)	Jim Hood (D)	Other	Undecided
Public Policy Polling	November 15–17, 2013	502	± 4.4%	45%	43%	—	12%

Poll source	Date(s) administered	Sample size	Margin of error	Thad Cochran (R)	Ronnie Musgrove (D)	Other	Undecided
Public Policy Polling	November 15–17, 2013	502	± 4.4%	50%	37%	—	13%

With Hosemann

Poll source	Date(s) administered	Sample size	Margin of error	Delbert Hosemann (R)	Travis Childers (D)	Other	Undecided
Public Policy Polling	November 15–17, 2013	502	± 4.4%	46%	36%	—	19%

Poll source	Date(s) administered	Sample size	Margin of error	Delbert Hosemann (R)	Jim Hood (D)	Other	Undecided
Public Policy Polling	November 15–17, 2013	502	± 4.4%	42%	41%	—	17%

Poll source	Date(s) administered	Sample size	Margin of error	Delbert Hosemann (R)	Ronnie Musgrove (D)	Other	Undecided
Public Policy Polling	November 15–17, 2013	502	± 4.4%	46%	38%	—	16%

With McDaniel

Poll source	Date(s) administered	Sample size	Margin of error	Chris McDaniel (R)	Travis Childers (D)	Other	Undecided
Public Policy Polling	November 15–17, 2013	502	± 4.4%	41%	38%	—	22%
Rasmussen Reports	March 26–29, 2014	750	± 4%	47%	35%	—	18%
Public Policy Polling	July 10–13, 2014	691	± 3.7%	36%	37%	4%	23%

Poll source	Date(s) administered	Sample size	Margin of error	Chris McDaniel (R)	Jim Hood (D)	Other	Undecided
Public Policy Polling	November 15–17, 2013	502	± 4.4%	41%	43%	—	16%

Poll source	Date(s) administered	Sample size	Margin of error	Chris McDaniel (R)	Ronnie Musgrove (D)	Other	Undecided
Public Policy Polling	November 15–17, 2013	502	± 4.4%	44%	41%	—	15%

=== Results ===
2014 United States Senate election in Mississippi
Party	Candidate	Votes	%	±%
Republican	Thad Cochran (incumbent)	378,481	59.90%	−1.54%
Democratic	Travis Childers	239,439	37.89%	−0.67%
Reform	Shawn O'Hara	13,938	2.21%	N/A
Total votes		631,858	100.00%	N/A
Republican hold				

==== By county ====
County	Thad Cochran Republican		Travis Childers Democratic		Shawn O'Hara Reform		Margin		Total
County	#	%	#	%	#	%	#	%	Total
Adams	4,360	50.61%	4,142	48.08%	113	1.31%	218	2.53%	8,615
Alcorn	4,300	70.76%	1,686	27.74%	91	1.50%	2,614	43.01%	6,077
Amite	2,306	58.53%	1,529	38.81%	105	2.66%	777	19.72%	3,940
Attala	2,508	60.30%	1,575	37.87%	76	1.83%	933	22.43%	4,159
Benton	920	47.94%	970	50.55%	29	1.51%	-50	-2.61%	1,919
Bolivar	3,996	46.93%	4,410	51.80%	108	1.27%	-414	-4.86%	8,514
Calhoun	2,136	62.71%	1,224	35.94%	46	1.35%	912	26.78%	3,406
Carroll	2,127	68.88%	902	29.21%	59	1.91%	1,225	39.67%	3,088
Chickasaw	2,002	46.56%	2,269	52.77%	29	0.67%	-267	-6.21%	4,300
Choctaw	1,521	66.80%	713	31.31%	43	1.89%	808	35.49%	2,277
Claiborne	551	25.29%	1,610	73.89%	18	0.83%	-1,059	-48.60%	2,179
Clarke	2,760	66.78%	1,275	30.85%	98	2.37%	1,485	35.93%	4,133
Clay	2,797	43.90%	3,522	55.28%	52	0.82%	-725	-11.38%	6,371
Coahoma	2,218	44.71%	2,670	53.82%	73	1.47%	-452	-9.11%	4,961
Copiah	3,330	51.91%	2,950	45.99%	135	2.10%	380	5.92%	6,415
Covington	2,940	57.46%	2,000	39.09%	177	3.46%	940	18.37%	5,117
DeSoto	16,920	66.85%	7,535	29.77%	857	3.39%	9,385	37.08%	25,312
Forrest	9,196	64.10%	4,766	33.22%	384	2.68%	4,430	30.88%	14,346
Franklin	1,445	63.43%	794	34.86%	39	1.71%	651	28.58%	2,278
George	3,331	76.52%	728	16.72%	294	6.75%	2,603	59.80%	4,353
Greene	1,708	71.92%	517	21.77%	150	6.32%	1,191	50.15%	2,375
Grenada	3,111	55.83%	2,377	42.66%	84	1.51%	734	13.17%	5,572
Hancock	6,699	73.00%	2,004	21.84%	474	5.17%	4,695	51.16%	9,177
Harrison	22,113	65.80%	10,269	30.56%	1,222	3.64%	11,844	35.25%	33,604
Hinds	20,975	40.98%	29,609	57.85%	600	1.17%	-8,634	-16.87%	51,184
Holmes	1,313	29.69%	3,069	69.40%	40	0.90%	-1,756	-39.71%	4,422
Humphreys	990	43.65%	1,262	55.64%	16	0.71%	-272	-11.99%	2,268
Issaquena	196	51.72%	181	47.76%	2	0.53%	15	3.96%	379
Itawamba	3,259	67.92%	1,452	30.26%	87	1.81%	1,807	37.66%	4,798
Jackson	21,393	70.24%	8,065	26.48%	997	3.27%	13,328	43.76%	30,455
Jasper	2,073	44.29%	2,493	53.27%	114	2.44%	-420	-8.97%	4,680
Jefferson	444	23.19%	1,455	75.98%	16	0.84%	-1,011	-52.79%	1,915
Jefferson Davis	1,644	41.25%	2,264	56.81%	77	1.93%	-620	-15.56%	3,985
Jones	9,444	56.46%	6,540	39.10%	742	4.44%	2,904	17.36%	16,726
Kemper	1,043	45.05%	1,244	53.74%	28	1.21%	-201	-8.68%	2,315
Lafayette	6,311	64.87%	3,278	33.70%	139	1.43%	3,033	31.18%	9,728
Lamar	10,399	76.47%	2,786	20.49%	413	3.04%	7,613	55.99%	13,598
Lauderdale	10,359	70.46%	4,109	27.95%	234	1.59%	6,250	42.51%	14,702
Lawrence	2,142	63.17%	1,183	34.89%	66	1.95%	959	28.28%	3,391
Leake	2,667	56.91%	1,923	41.04%	96	2.05%	744	15.88%	4,686
Lee	11,792	62.51%	6,790	35.99%	283	1.50%	5,002	26.51%	18,865
Leflore	2,472	42.34%	3,332	57.06%	35	0.60%	-860	-14.73%	5,839
Lincoln	5,278	71.18%	1,987	26.80%	150	2.02%	3,291	44.38%	7,415
Lowndes	8,245	56.37%	6,229	42.59%	152	1.04%	2,016	13.78%	14,626
Madison	16,359	67.08%	7,737	31.73%	290	1.19%	8,622	35.36%	24,386
Marion	4,067	65.65%	1,997	32.24%	131	2.11%	2,070	33.41%	6,195
Marshall	3,130	42.98%	4,007	55.02%	146	2.00%	-877	-12.04%	7,283
Monroe	4,552	58.54%	3,150	40.51%	74	0.95%	1,402	18.03%	7,776
Montgomery	1,539	56.05%	1,154	42.02%	53	1.93%	385	14.02%	2,746
Neshoba	4,526	73.71%	1,495	24.35%	119	1.94%	3,031	49.36%	6,140
Newton	3,602	71.82%	1,308	26.08%	105	2.09%	2,294	45.74%	5,015
Noxubee	863	30.37%	1,958	68.90%	21	0.74%	-1,095	-38.53%	2,842
Oktibbeha	5,340	58.77%	3,683	40.53%	64	0.70%	1,657	18.23%	9,087
Panola	3,535	51.89%	3,165	46.46%	113	1.66%	370	5.43%	6,813
Pearl River	7,943	73.85%	2,096	19.49%	716	6.66%	5,847	54.37%	10,755
Perry	1,814	66.25%	798	29.15%	126	4.60%	1,016	37.11%	2,738
Pike	4,203	53.74%	3,481	44.51%	137	1.75%	722	9.23%	7,821
Pontotoc	4,539	69.71%	1,830	28.11%	142	2.18%	2,709	41.61%	6,511
Prentiss	2,588	49.00%	2,635	49.89%	59	1.12%	-47	-0.89%	5,282
Quitman	998	39.73%	1,464	58.28%	50	1.99%	-466	-18.55%	2,512
Rankin	24,552	76.44%	6,840	21.30%	728	2.27%	17,712	55.14%	32,120
Scott	3,117	62.19%	1,803	35.97%	92	1.84%	1,314	26.22%	5,012
Sharkey	539	48.51%	560	50.41%	12	1.08%	-21	-1.89%	1,111
Simpson	4,347	62.41%	2,502	35.92%	116	1.67%	1,845	26.49%	6,965
Smith	2,890	67.33%	1,276	29.73%	126	2.94%	1,614	37.60%	4,292
Stone	2,886	71.68%	980	24.34%	160	3.97%	1,906	47.34%	4,026
Sunflower	2,002	39.35%	3,032	59.59%	54	1.06%	-1,030	-20.24%	5,088
Tallahatchie	1,340	46.33%	1,509	52.18%	43	1.49%	-169	-5.84%	2,892
Tate	3,159	63.56%	1,676	33.72%	135	2.72%	1,483	29.84%	4,970
Tippah	3,243	66.99%	1,513	31.25%	85	1.76%	1,730	35.74%	4,841
Tishomingo	3,088	66.80%	1,425	30.82%	110	2.38%	1,663	35.97%	4,623
Tunica	642	38.60%	995	59.83%	26	1.56%	-353	-21.23%	1,663
Union	3,996	69.86%	1,655	28.93%	69	1.21%	2,341	40.93%	5,720
Walthall	2,289	57.50%	1,598	40.14%	94	2.36%	691	17.36%	3,981
Warren	6,480	58.22%	4,448	39.96%	202	1.81%	2,032	18.26%	11,130
Washington	3,987	45.93%	4,586	52.83%	107	1.23%	-599	-6.90%	8,680
Wayne	2,384	55.16%	1,773	41.02%	165	3.82%	611	14.14%	4,322
Webster	2,116	75.17%	661	23.48%	38	1.35%	1,455	51.69%	2,815
Wilkinson	841	39.43%	1,267	59.40%	25	1.17%	-426	-19.97%	2,133
Winston	2,783	55.72%	2,155	43.14%	57	1.14%	628	12.57%	4,995
Yalobusha	1,710	53.06%	1,465	45.45%	48	1.49%	245	7.60%	3,223
Yazoo	2,758	56.41%	2,074	42.42%	57	1.17%	684	13.99%	4,889
Totals	378,481	59.90%	239,439	37.89%	13,938	2.21%	139,042	22.01%	631,858

==== Counties that flipped from Democratic to Republican ====
- Adams (largest city: Natchez)
- Issaquena (largest city: Mayersville)

==== Counties that flipped from Republican to Democratic ====
- Benton (largest municipality: Ashland)
- Chickasaw (largest city: Houston)
- Prentiss (largest city: Booneville)

==== By congressional district ====
Cochran won three of four congressional districts.

District	Cochran	Childers	Representative
1st	61%	37%	Alan Nunnelee
2nd	45%	54%	Bennie Thompson
3rd	65%	33%	Gregg Harper
4th	68%	28%	Steven Palazzo

== Aftermath ==
In the aftermath of the runoff, the McDaniel campaign claimed there were indications of voter fraud. A day after the election results were certified by the state party, Senator Ted Cruz and some Tea Party groups backed an investigation of supposed voter fraud in the runoff election. Cruz also told reporters that groups aligned with the Cochran campaign had run racially charged ads designed to persuade black voters to vote against McDaniel.

McDaniel's legal challenge to the runoff election results failed. He unsuccessfully ran in the 2018 special election triggered by Cochran's resignation.

== See also ==
- 2014 United States Senate elections
- 2014 United States elections
