= 2008 United States House of Representatives elections in Mississippi =

- November 4, 2008

All 4 Mississippi seats to the United States House of Representatives
	Majority party	Minority party
Party	Democratic	Republican
Last election	2	2
Seats before	3	1
Seats won	3	1
Seat change	Steady	Steady
Popular vote	731,805	527,330
Percentage	57.86%	41.69%
Swing	▲14.52%	▼8.96%

Democratic
50–60%
60–70%
70–80%
80–90%
Republican
40–50%
50–60%
60–70%
70–80%

The 2008 congressional elections in Mississippi were held on November 4, 2008 to determine who will represent the state of Mississippi in the United States House of Representatives. The primary election for candidates seeking the nomination of the Republican Party or the Democratic Party was held on March 11, with a run-off being held for the Republican nomination in the first and third districts, and for the Democratic nomination in the first district.

Mississippi has four seats in the House, apportioned according to the 2000 United States census. Representatives were elected for two-year terms; those elected served in the 111th Congress from January 4, 2009 until January 3, 2011. The election coincided with the United States Senate special election to fill the remainder of Trent Lott's term, the regularly scheduled 2008 United States Senate election, and the 2008 U.S. presidential election.

With the results of the 1st congressional district special election included, the Mississippi congressional delegation comprised three Democrats and one Republican. As of 2026, this is the last time in which Democrats won a majority of congressional districts from Mississippi or won a majority of the popular vote.

== Overview ==
2008 United States House of Representatives elections in Mississippi
Party	Votes	Percentage	Seats	+/–
Democratic	731,805	57.86%	3	Steady
Republican	527,330	41.69%	1	Steady
Independents	3,736	0.30%	0	Steady
Green	1,876	0.15%	0	Steady
Totals	1,264,747	100.00%	4	Steady

== District 1 ==
2008 Mississippi's 1st congressional district election

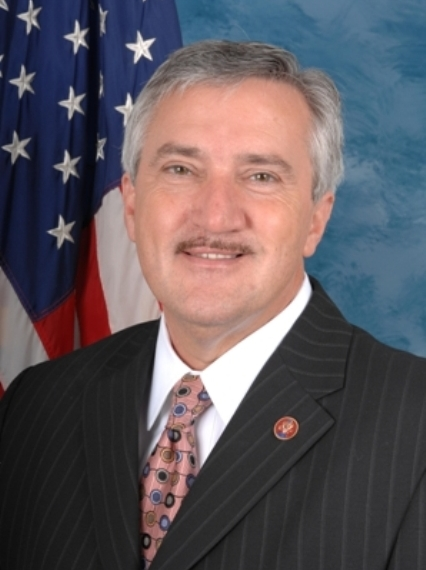

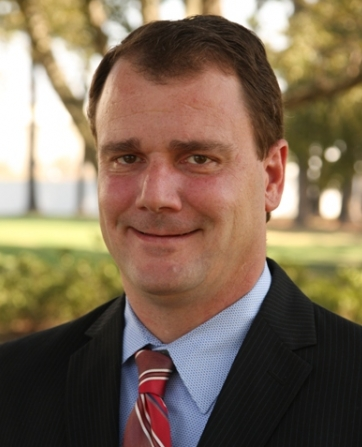
Nominee	Travis Childers	Greg Davis
Party	Democratic	Republican
Popular vote	185,959	149,818
Percentage	54.47%	43.88%
- Childers: 40–50% 50–60% 60–70% 70–80% 80–90% >90% Davis: 40–50% 50–60% 60–70% 70–80% 80–90% No Data
U.S. Representative before election
Travis Childers
Democratic
Elected U.S. Representative
Travis Childers
Democratic

This district covers the northeastern part of the state, including the cities of Columbus, Grenada, Oxford, Southaven, and Tupelo. Democrat Travis Childers was the Representative of the district, having defeated Republican Greg Davis in an April 22 special election. Childers and Davis faced each other again in November along with Green Party candidate John Wages, Jr., a college professor and farmer; and independent candidate Wally Pang, a restaurant owner. Childers was re-elected with 54.47% of the vote.

=== Predictions ===
Source	Ranking	As of
The Cook Political Report	Likely D	November 6, 2008
Rothenberg	Safe D	November 2, 2008
Sabato's Crystal Ball	Lean D	November 6, 2008
Real Clear Politics	Lean D	November 7, 2008
CQ Politics	Lean D	November 6, 2008

=== Results ===
2008 Mississippi's 1st congressional district election
Party	Candidate	Votes	%
Democratic	Travis Childers (inc.)	185,959	54.47
Republican	Greg Davis	149,818	43.88
Independent	Wally Pang	3,736	1.09
Green	John M. Wages, Jr.	1,876	0.55
Total votes		341,389	100.00
Democratic hold			

==== By county ====
County	Travis Childers Democratic		Greg Davis Republican		Various candidates Other parties		Margin		Total
County	#	%	#	%	#	%	#	%	Total
Alcorn	8,672	57.91%	6,171	41.21%	133	0.89%	2,501	16.70%	14,976
Benton	3,019	67.36%	1,407	31.39%	56	1.25%	1,612	35.97%	4,482
Calhoun	4,121	58.85%	2,818	40.25%	63	0.90%	1,303	18.61%	7,002
Chickasaw	6,078	69.30%	2,608	29.73%	85	0.97%	3,470	39.56%	8,771
Choctaw	2,242	55.25%	1,779	43.84%	37	0.91%	463	11.41%	4,058
Clay	7,790	70.99%	3,105	28.29%	79	0.72%	4,685	42.69%	10,974
DeSoto	22,259	35.22%	40,039	63.36%	897	1.42%	-17,780	-28.14%	63,195
Grenada	5,996	54.38%	4,926	44.68%	104	0.94%	1,070	9.70%	11,026
Itawamba	5,659	57.08%	4,121	41.57%	134	1.35%	1,538	15.51%	9,914
Lafayette	9,271	51.30%	8,331	46.10%	470	2.60%	940	5.20%	18,072
Lee	19,345	56.07%	14,664	42.50%	491	1.42%	4,681	13.57%	34,500
Lowndes	15,016	55.70%	11,687	43.35%	256	0.95%	3,329	12.35%	26,959
Marshall	10,809	67.68%	4,949	30.99%	213	2.25%	5,860	36.69%	15,971
Monroe	10,897	62.86%	6,266	36.15%	171	0.99%	4,631	26.72%	17,334
Panola	9,622	59.91%	5,005	31.16%	1,434	8.93%	4,617	28.75%	16,061
Pontotoc	6,706	52.66%	5,880	46.17%	149	1.17%	826	6.49%	12,735
Prentiss	8,589	77.90%	2,342	21.24%	94	0.85%	6,247	56.66%	11,025
Tate	6,100	48.74%	6,173	49.32%	242	1.93%	-73	-0.58%	12,515
Tippah	5,553	57.57%	4,012	41.60%	80	0.83%	1,541	15.98%	9,645
Tishomingo	4,788	57.67%	3,412	41.09%	103	1.24%	1,376	16.57%	8,303
Union	7,029	57.94%	4,988	41.12%	114	0.94%	2,041	16.82%	12,131
Webster (part)	2,278	45.68%	2,667	53.48%	42	0.84%	-389	-7.80%	4,987
Winston (part)	26	46.43%	30	53.57%	0	0.00%	-4	-7.14%	56
Yalobusha	4,094	61.13%	2,438	36.40%	165	2.46%	1,656	24.73%	6,697
Totals	185,959	54.47%	149,818	43.88%	5,612	1.64%	36,151	10.59%	341,389

== District 2 ==
2008 Mississippi's 2nd congressional district election

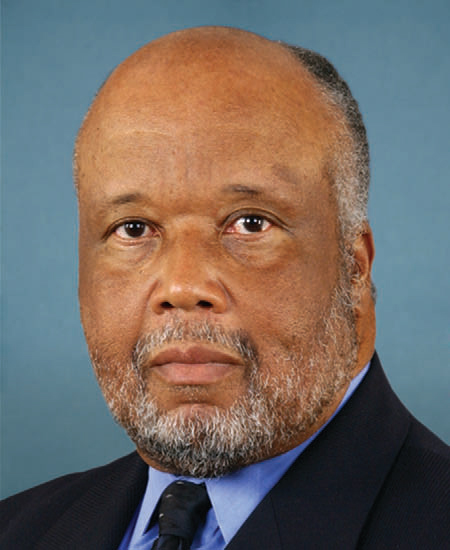

Nominee	Bennie Thompson	Richard Cook
Party	Democratic	Republican
Popular vote	201,606	90,364
Percentage	69.05%	30.95%
- Thompson: 50–60% 60–70% 70–80% 80–90% >90% Cook: 50–60% 60–70% 70–80% 80–90% No Data
U.S. Representative before election
Bennie Thompson
Democratic
Elected U.S. Representative
Bennie Thompson
Democratic

This district consists of the Mississippi Delta and most of the capital city of Jackson and is Mississippi's only majority-black district. Democrat Bennie Thompson had been in office since 1993, when he won a special election to replace Mike Espy who had resigned to become Secretary of Agriculture under President Bill Clinton. Thompson was challenged on the Republican side by teacher Richard Cook. CQ Politics forecasts the race as 'Safe Democrat' and Thompson was comfortably re-elected with 69.05% of the vote.

=== Predictions ===
Source	Ranking	As of
The Cook Political Report	Safe D	November 6, 2008
Rothenberg	Safe D	November 2, 2008
Sabato's Crystal Ball	Safe D	November 6, 2008
Real Clear Politics	Safe D	November 7, 2008
CQ Politics	Safe D	November 6, 2008

=== Results ===
2008 Mississippi's 2nd congressional district election
Party	Candidate	Votes	%
Democratic	Bennie Thompson (inc.)	201,606	69.05
Republican	Richard Cook	90,364	30.95
Total votes		291,970	100.00
Democratic hold			

==== By county ====
County	Bennie Thompson Democratic		Richard Cook Republican		Margin		Total
County	#	%	#	%	#	%	Total
Attala	4,325	47.93%	4,698	52.07%	-373	-4.13%	9,023
Bolivar	10,599	70.55%	4,424	29.45%	6,175	41.10%	15,023
Carroll	2,296	39.02%	3,588	60.98%	-1,292	-21.96%	5,884
Claiborne	4,668	86.51%	728	13.49%	3,940	73.02%	5,396
Coahoma	7,584	74.74%	2,563	25.26%	5,021	49.48%	10,147
Copiah	8,466	59.38%	5,791	40.62%	2,675	18.76%	14,257
Hinds (part)	69,162	75.31%	22,677	24.69%	46,485	50.62%	91,839
Holmes	7,857	83.53%	1,549	16.47%	6,308	67.06%	9,406
Humphreys	3,749	75.39%	1,224	24.61%	2,525	50.77%	4,973
Issaquena	592	63.79%	336	36.21%	256	27.59%	928
Jefferson	3,937	88.79%	497	11.21%	3,440	77.58%	4,434
Leake (part)	2,833	59.29%	1,945	40.71%	888	18.59%	4,778
Leflore	8,987	70.88%	3,693	29.12%	5,294	41.75%	12,680
Madison (part)	11,412	66.87%	5,654	33.13%	5,758	33.74%	17,066
Montgomery	3,031	54.18%	2,563	45.82%	468	8.37%	5,594
Quitman	2,887	71.57%	1,147	28.43%	1,740	43.13%	4,034
Sharkey	1,951	72.69%	733	27.31%	1,218	45.38%	2,684
Sunflower	8,309	74.98%	2,772	25.02%	5,537	49.97%	11,081
Tallahatchie	4,588	67.33%	2,226	32.67%	2,362	34.66%	6,814
Tunica	3,236	78.20%	902	21.80%	2,334	56.40%	4,138
Warren	11,101	51.94%	10,273	48.06%	828	3.87%	21,374
Washington	13,547	70.53%	5,661	29.47%	7,886	41.06%	19,208
Yazoo	6,489	57.89%	4,720	42.11%	1,769	15.78%	11,209
Totals	201,606	69.05%	90,364	30.95%	111,242	38.10%	291,970

== District 3 ==
2008 Mississippi's 3rd congressional district election

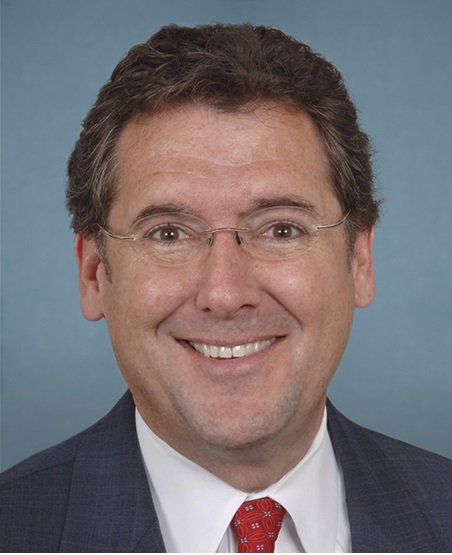

Nominee	Gregg Harper	Joel Gill
Party	Republican	Democratic
Popular vote	213,171	127,698
Percentage	62.54%	37.46%
- Harper: 50–60% 60–70% 70–80% 80–90% >90% Gill: 50–60% 60–70% 70–80% 80–90% >90% No Data
U.S. Representative before election
Chip Pickering
Republican
Elected U.S. Representative
Gregg Harper
Republican

Republican Chip Pickering retired from Congress at this election after 12 years of service. The candidates were Republican Gregg Harper, attorney and chairman of the Rankin County Republican Party; Democrat Joel Gill, Pickens town alderman and a cattle broker; and independent candidate Jim Giles, a former systems engineer and white supremacist. Forecasted as 'Safe Republican', Harper was elected with 62.54% of the vote.

=== Predictions ===
Source	Ranking	As of
The Cook Political Report	Safe R	November 6, 2008
Rothenberg	Safe R	November 2, 2008
Sabato's Crystal Ball	Safe R	November 6, 2008
Real Clear Politics	Safe R	November 7, 2008
CQ Politics	Safe R	November 6, 2008

2008 Mississippi's 3rd congressional district election
Party	Candidate	Votes	%
Republican	Gregg Harper	213,171	62.54
Democratic	Joel Gill	127,698	37.46
Total votes		340,869	100.00
Republican hold			

==== By county ====
County	Gregg Harper Republican		Joel Gill Democratic		Margin		Total
County	#	%	#	%	#	%	Total
Adams	6,380	43.53%	8,275	56.47%	-1,895	-12.93%	14,655
Amite	4,056	54.72%	3,356	45.28%	700	9.44%	7,412
Covington	5,333	57.49%	3,943	42.51%	1,390	14.98%	9,276
Franklin	2,770	61.47%	1,736	38.53%	1,034	22.95%	4,506
Hinds (part)	10,037	66.04%	5,162	33.96%	4,875	32.07%	15,199
Jasper (part)	1,448	43.60%	1,873	56.40%	-425	-12.80%	3,321
Jefferson Davis	2,782	38.70%	4,406	61.30%	-1,624	-22.59%	7,188
Jones (part)	706	60.45%	462	39.55%	244	20.89%	1,168
Kemper	2,057	40.27%	3,051	59.73%	-994	-19.46%	5,108
Lauderdale	20,546	63.84%	11,639	36.16%	8,907	27.67%	32,185
Lawrence	4,174	60.59%	2,715	39.41%	1,459	21.18%	6,889
Leake (part)	2,672	61.24%	1,691	38.76%	981	22.48%	4,363
Lincoln	10,365	64.44%	5,720	35.56%	4,645	28.88%	16,085
Madison (part)	21,888	74.69%	7,418	25.31%	14,470	49.38%	29,306
Marion (part)	3,569	68.95%	1,607	31.05%	1,962	37.91%	5,176
Neshoba	7,942	70.64%	3,301	29.36%	4,641	41.28%	11,243
Newton	6,574	68.15%	3,073	31.85%	3,501	36.29%	9,647
Noxubee	1,608	26.47%	4,467	73.53%	-2,859	-47.06%	6,075
Oktibbeha	9,490	53.12%	8,374	46.88%	1,116	6.25%	17,864
Pike	8,573	48.32%	9,169	51.68%	-596	-3.36%	17,742
Rankin	48,984	79.15%	12,903	20.85%	36,081	58.30%	61,887
Scott	6,450	56.39%	4,988	43.61%	1,462	12.78%	11,438
Simpson	7,536	61.16%	4,785	38.84%	2,751	22.33%	12,321
Smith	5,918	72.40%	2,256	27.60%	3,662	44.80%	8,174
Walthall	4,004	53.85%	3,432	46.15%	572	7.69%	7,436
Webster (part)	271	64.68%	148	35.32%	123	29.36%	419
Wilkinson	1,671	34.70%	3,144	65.30%	-1,473	-30.59%	4,815
Winston (part)	5,367	53.83%	4,604	46.17%	763	7.65%	9,971
Totals	213,171	62.54%	127,698	37.46%	85,473	25.08%	340,869

== District 4 ==
2008 Mississippi's 4th congressional district election

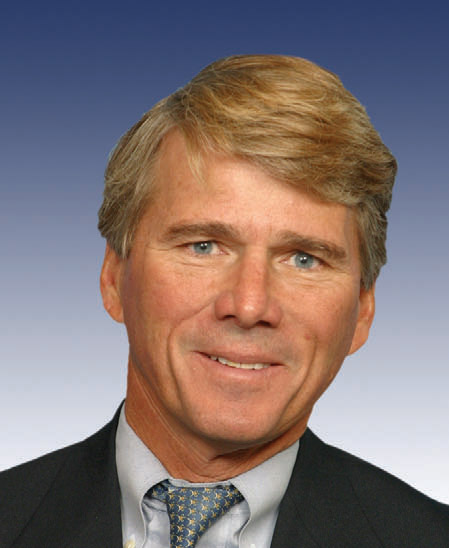

Nominee	Gene Taylor	John McCay III
Party	Democratic	Republican
Popular vote	216,542	73,977
Percentage	74.54%	25.46%
- Taylor: 50–60% 60–70% 70–80% 80–90% >90% McCay: 50–60% 60–70% 70–80% 80–90% No Data
U.S. Representative before election
Gene Taylor
Democratic
Elected U.S. Representative
Gene Taylor
Democratic

Democrat Gene Taylor had represented the district since 1989. He was challenged on the Republican side by Methodist minister and Air National Guard officer John McCay III.CQ Politics forecast the race as 'Safe Democrat' and Taylor was re-elected with nearly 75% of the vote.

=== Predictions ===
Source	Ranking	As of
The Cook Political Report	Safe D	November 6, 2008
Rothenberg	Safe D	November 2, 2008
Sabato's Crystal Ball	Safe D	November 6, 2008
Real Clear Politics	Safe D	November 7, 2008
CQ Politics	Safe D	November 6, 2008

=== Results ===
2008 Mississippi's 4th congressional district election
Party	Candidate	Votes	%
Democratic	Gene Taylor (inc.)	216,542	74.54
Republican	John McCay III	73,977	25.46
Total votes		290,519	100.00
Democratic hold			

==== By county ====
County	Gene Taylor Democratic		John McCay III Republican		Margin		Total
County	#	%	#	%	#	%	Total
Clarke	4,542	55.56%	3,633	44.44%	909	11.12%	8,175
Forrest	20,517	76.79%	6,203	23.21%	14,314	53.57%	26,720
George	6,569	70.89%	2,697	29.11%	3,872	41.79%	9,266
Greene	4,318	75.20%	1,424	24.80%	2,894	50.40%	5,742
Hancock	13,425	79.86%	3,386	20.14%	10,039	59.72%	16,811
Harrison	50,532	82.32%	10,856	17.68%	39,676	64.63%	61,388
Jackson	41,036	76.76%	12,422	23.24%	28,614	53.53%	53,458
Jasper (part)	4,345	76.32%	1,348	23.68%	2,997	52.64%	5,693
Jones (part)	19,229	69.06%	8,615	30.94%	10,614	38.12%	27,844
Lamar	15,596	66.33%	7,915	33.67%	7,681	32.67%	23,511
Marion (part)	5,430	72.29%	2,081	27.71%	3,349	44.59%	7,511
Pearl River	12,885	59.45%	8,788	40.55%	4,097	18.90%	21,673
Perry	4,353	77.73%	1,247	22.27%	3,106	55.46%	5,600
Stone	5,930	82.46%	1,261	17.54%	4,669	64.93%	7,191
Wayne	7,835	78.85%	2,101	21.15%	5,734	57.71%	9,936
Totals	216,542	74.54%	73,977	25.46%	142,565	49.07%	290,519
