= Glenn McCullough =

American politician (born 1954)

Executive Director of the Mississippi Development Authority
- In office May 2015 – January 2020
- Governor: Phil Bryant
- Preceded by: Brent Christensen

Chair of the Tennessee Valley Authority
- In office July 19, 2001 – May 18, 2005
- President: George W. Bush
- Preceded by: Craven Crowell
- Succeeded by: Bill Sansom

Mayor of Tupelo
- In office June 1997 – November 1999
- Preceded by: Jack Marshall
- Succeeded by: Larry Otis

Personal details
- Born: December 18, 1954 (age 71) Tupelo, Mississippi
- Party: Republican
- Spouse: Laura White
- Children: Two
- Education: Mississippi State University (B.S.)
- Profession: Economic development

Glenn L. McCullough Jr. (born December 18, 1954, in Tupelo, Mississippi) is a Mississippi businessman, Republican Party politician, and economic development professional. He was executive director of the Mississippi Development Authority, and had previously served as chairman of the Tennessee Valley Authority and executive director of the Appalachian Regional Commission.

== Early life ==
McCullough is a sixth generation Mississippian. He attended Mississippi State University where he received a bachelor's degree in Agricultural Economics in 1977. He was vice president of McCullough Steel Products, Inc. and served on the staff of Mississippi Governor Kirk Fordice. From 1993 to 1997, McCullough was the executive director of the Appalachian Regional Commission, a Federal-state partnership that supports economic development efforts across 13 states in the eastern United States.

== Tennessee Valley Authority ==
After his time at ARC, McCullough was elected mayor of Tupelo in 1997. He resigned in 1999 when President Bill Clinton appointed him to the board of the Tennessee Valley Authority. President George W. Bush nominated McCullough as chair of the board on July 19, 2001. His term expired on May 18, 2005. During this time he also served in an advisory capacity to several Energy related U.S. institutions. During his tenure with TVA, the utility earned national recognition for its economic development efforts and launched its megasite program. McCullough's efforts at TVA were critical to securing Toyota Motor Manufacturing Mississippi, Mississippi's second original equipment manufacturer in the automobile industry, which is located on a TVA megasite.

== Run for Congress ==
McCullough was a candidate for the U.S. House of Representatives when the seat became vacant due to the appointment of Congressman Roger Wicker to the United States Senate. After coming in first in the Republican primary, McCullough narrowly lost the Republican runoff to Southaven Mayor Greg Davis who was then defeated in the general election by Democrat Travis Childers.

== Mississippi Development Authority ==
In May 2015, McCullough was appointed by Governor Phil Bryant as the executive director of the Mississippi Development Authority. In this role, McCullough is the chief administrator responsible for coordinating the state of Mississippi's efforts in economic development, business recruitment, trade promotion and development, and the Momentum Mississippi campaign.

McCullough is married with two sons and lives in Tupelo. McCullough has been mentioned as a possible Republican candidate for Governor of Mississippi in 2019.
