= Freedom's Watch =

Former American political lobbying organization

Freedom's Watch was a Washington, D.C.-based 501(c)(4) lobbying organization. Freedom's Watch was supportive of the George W. Bush administration's positions in the war on terror and of Republican Congressional candidates. The group was run and supported, in part, by several former officials of the Bush administration. The organization stated that its goal was "educating individuals about and advancing public policies that protect America’s interests at home and abroad, foster economic prosperity, and strengthen families." In the 2008 election cycle, Freedom's Watch purchased advertisements in support of Republican congressional candidates.

Bradley A. Blakeman, Republican strategist and former member of George W. Bush's senior staff, served as President.

In December 2008, the organization's board of directors decided to shut it down at the end of 2008.

== Origins ==
Freedom's Watch had a working relationship with the Republican Jewish Coalition (RJC) and the American Enterprise Institute. The group was conceived at a Florida meeting of the RJC in March 2007 in part to counter MoveOn.org and help the Bush administration sell its Iraq policy. It was founded by a 12 people, most notably Sheldon Adelson, who donated almost all of its initial funding. Four out of five members of Freedom's Watch original board were Republican Jews, and four of the eight initial donors were Jewish, though board member Matt Brooks said "it would be a mistake to regard the group as having a Jewish direction," and noted that "half of the donors contributing to the group's first $15 million ad campaign are not Jewish."

In 2008, the group became paralyzed by internal problems and plagued by gridlock and infighting, according to Republican operatives who criticized Adelson's insistence on parceling out money project by project, which limited the group's ability to plan and be nimble. For example, the organization spent weeks working on a package for the presidential election, but the plan did not go forward. Some staff members blamed the problems on major donors who micro-managed the management of the start-up.

== Positions ==
Freedom's Watch supported President George W. Bush's Iraq War policies. "More and more Democratic and Republican members agree: The surge in Iraq is working," according to one ad. "Victory is America's only choice." The group also claimed that Iran is a grave threat to the United States and Israel. According to the group's president, "If Hitler's warnings were heeded when he wrote Mein Kampf, he could have been stopped." Iranian president Mahmoud Ahmadinejad, he continued, "is giving all the same kind of warning signs to us, and the region—he wants the destruction of the United States and the destruction of Israel." One ad called Ahmadinejad "a terrorist."

== Board ==
- Ari Fleischer, a former Bush press secretary.
- Matthew Brooks, executive director of the Republican Jewish Coalition (RJC).
- Mel Sembler, a longtime RJC leader and former ambassador to Italy who helped finance the 2000 Florida recount battle.
- William Weidner, a Las Vegas casino operator.

The original president was Bradley Blakeman, though he resigned in March 2008 after a series of high-level staff departures.

== Notable donors ==
Freedom's Watch's donors included:

- Sheldon Adelson, CEO of Las Vegas Sands Corporation and the fifteenth-richest American in Forbes magazine's rankings last year, was the top donor.
- Mel Sembler
- John Templeton, Jr, board member of the Templeton Growth Fund and financier of Let Freedom Ring.
- Kevin E. Moley, former U.S. ambassador to international organizations in Geneva, and a senior adviser to Dick Cheney during the 2000 campaign.
- Howard Leach, CEO of Leach Capital and former ambassador to France who also helped fund the Florida recount.
- Anthony H. Gioia, head of Gioia Management and former ambassador to Malta.
- Richard Fox, co-founder of the Republican Jewish Coalition.
- Gary Erlbaum, owner of Greentree Properties.
- Ed Snider, owner of the Philadelphia Flyers and 76ers.

== Advertising ==
On August 22, 2007, Freedom's Watch announced a $15 million advertising and grass-roots campaign in 20 U.S. states to maintain Republican support for President Bush's policies. The advertising campaign emphasized the sacrifice of U.S. troops and their families in Iraq. As The New York Times wrote, "Several of the group's spots suggested that Iraq, rather than Al Qaeda, was behind the September 11 attacks, even though the independent September 11 commission investigation and other inquiries found no evidence of Iraq's involvement." ABC News, among others, concurred: "The ads also link the war with September 11, despite no reliable evidence Iraq played any role in those attacks." In one advertisement, a war widow claims, "I lost two family members to Al Qaeda—my uncle, a firefighter, on 9/11, and my husband, Travis, in Iraq. Congress did the right thing, voting to defeat terrorism in Iraq and Afghanistan," adding that, "Switching their votes now, for political reasons, it will mean more attacks in America." In another ad, an Iraq war veteran states, "They attacked us, and they will again. They won't stop in Iraq."

On September 13, the group aired a new television ad, challenging a MoveOn.org advertisement which questioned the integrity of General David Petraeus saying "General Petraeus or General Betray Us?" and "Cooking the Books for the White House." The advertisement stated, "Name calling, charges of betrayal it's despicable. It's what MoveOn shamefully does—and it's wrong. America and the forces of freedom are winning. MoveOn is losing. Call your Congressman and Senator. Tell them to condemn MoveOn." They also planned to run print advertisements on the subject.

Freedom's Watch also purchased advertisements during the 2008 election cycle in support of Republican congressional candidates. For example, the group purchased $550,000 in advertising in the Mississippi 1st district special election in support of Republican candidate Greg Davis. The group also ran ads in support of Republican candidates in two other special elections to fill vacant house seats in Illinois and Louisiana. All three Republicans were subsequently defeated by their Democratic challengers in historically Republican districts.

== Criticism ==
In 2008, the Democratic Congressional Campaign Committee charged that, in a Congressional race in Louisiana, Freedom's Watch was running a television advertisement with a script that came from the National Republican Congressional Committee. Such coordination with the NRCC would be illegal for Freedom's Watch because of the latter's status as an independent group. A media consultant working for Freedom's Watch responded that the apparent origin of the script with the NRCC was the result of an innocent mistake.
