= Joey Hood =

American politician (born 1976)

Member of the Mississippi House of Representatives from the 35th district
- Incumbent
- Assumed office January 2012
- Preceded by: Dannie Reed

Personal details
- Born: December 11, 1976 (age 49) Amory, Mississippi, U.S.
- Party: Republican

Joey Hood (born December 11, 1976) is a Republican member of the Mississippi House of Representatives from Ackerman, Mississippi. Hood attended the French Camp Academy in French Camp, Mississippi, and received a history and political science degree from Mississippi State University. He then worked for Republican senator Trent Lott in Washington D.C. Hood later returned to Mississippi to study at the Mississippi College School of Law and became a law clerk and attorney.

On August 2, 2011, Hood won a Republican primary election and stood as his party's candidate for District 35. No Democrat ran against him and Hood easily defeated the Libertarian candidate in the November 8, 2011 general election.
