= Mississippi's 1st congressional district =

U.S. House district for Mississippi

Coordinates: 34°11′51″N 89°00′13″W

- Interactive map of district boundaries since January 3, 2023
- Representative: Trent Kelly; R–Saltillo
- Area: 11,412 mi^{2} (29,560 km^{2})
- Distribution: 61.64% rural; 38.36% urban
- Population (2025): 756,595
- Median household income: $62,117
- Ethnicity: 64.7% White; 27.2% Black; 3.8% Hispanic; 2.9% Two or more races; 0.9% Asian; 0.4% other
- Occupation: 56.6% White-collar; 30.4% Blue-collar; 13% Gray-collar
- Cook PVI: R+18

Mississippi's 1st congressional district is in the northeast corner of the state. It includes much of the northern portion of the state including Columbus, Hernando, Horn Lake, Olive Branch, Oxford, Southaven, Tupelo, and West Point. The University of Mississippi (Ole Miss) and Northwest Mississippi Community College are in the district.

The district includes Alcorn, Benton, Calhoun, Chickasaw, Choctaw, Clay, DeSoto, Itawamba, Lafayette, Lee, Lowndes, Marshall, Monroe, Pontotoc, Prentiss, Tate, Tippah, Tishomingo, Union, Webster, and a portion of Oktibbeha County.

From statehood to the election of 1846, Mississippi elected representatives at-large statewide on a general ticket.

The congressional seat has been held by Republican Trent Kelly who won a June, 2015 special election to fill the vacant seat previously held by Republican Alan Nunnelee who died on February 6, 2015. In the November 2010 election, Nunnelee had defeated Democratic incumbent Travis Childers, Constitutionalist Gail Giaramita, Independent Conservative Party candidate Wally Pang of Batesville, Libertarian Harold Taylor, and Reformist Barbara Dale Washer.

== Recent election results from statewide races ==
Year	Office	Results
2008	President	McCain 63% - 36%
2008	Senate (Reg.)	Cochran 65% - 35%
2008	Senate (Spec.)	Wicker 62% - 38%
2012	President	Romney 63% - 37%
2016	President	Trump 66% - 32%
2018	Senate (Reg.)	Wicker 66% - 32%
2018	Senate (Spec.)	Hyde-Smith 62% - 38%
2019	Governor	Reeves 60% - 39%
2019	Lt. Governor	Hosemann 67% - 33%
2019	Attorney General	Fitch 66% - 34%
2020	President	Trump 65% - 33%
2020	Senate	Hyde-Smith 61% - 37%
2023	Governor	Reeves 58% - 41%
2023	Lt. Governor	Hosemann 68% - 32%
2023	Secretary of State	Watson 67% - 33%
2023	Attorney General	Fitch 67% - 33%
2023	Auditor	White 66% - 34%
2023	Treasurer	McRae 67% - 33%
2024	President	Trump 68% - 31%
2024	Senate	Wicker 69% - 31%
2026	Senate	Hyde-Smith 55% - 42%

== Composition ==
The 1st district includes the entirety of the following counties with the exception of Oktibbeha, which it shares with the 3rd district. Oktibbeha County communities within the 1st district include Sturgis and Maben (which is partially located in Webster County).

#	County	Seat	Population
3	Alcorn	Corinth	34,135
9	Benton	Ashland	7,438
13	Calhoun	Pittsboro	12,685
17	Chickasaw	Houston, Okolona	16,866
19	Choctaw	Ackerman	8,088
25	Clay	West Point	18,206
33	DeSoto	Hernando	193,247
57	Itawamba	Fulton	24,093
71	Lafayette	Oxford	58,467
81	Lee	Tupelo	82,799
87	Lowndes	Columbus	57,283
93	Marshall	Holly Springs	34,123
95	Monroe	Aberdeen	33,609
105	Oktibbeha	Starkville	51,203
115	Pontotoc	Pontotoc	31,535
117	Prentiss	Booneville	25,135
137	Tate	Senatobia	28,261
139	Tippah	Ripley	21,287
141	Tishomingo	Iuka	18,507
145	Union	New Albany	28,284
155	Webster	Walthall	9,988

== List of members representing the district ==
Member	Party	Years	Cong ress	Electoral history	District location and map
District created March 4, 1847
Jacob Thompson (Oxford)	Democratic	March 4, 1847 – March 3, 1851	30th 31st	Redistricted from the at-large district and re-elected in 1846. Re-elected in 1848. Lost re-election as a Southern Rights candidate.	
Benjamin Nabers (Hickory Flat)	Union	March 4, 1851 – March 3, 1853	32nd	Elected in 1851. Lost re-election as a Whig.	
Daniel B. Wright (Salem)	Democratic	March 4, 1853 – March 3, 1857	33rd 34th	Elected in 1853. Re-elected in 1855. Retired.	
Lucius Q. C. Lamar (Abbeville)	Democratic	March 4, 1857 – December 20, 1860	35th 36th	Elected in 1857. Re-elected in 1859. Resigned to become a member of the secession convention of Mississippi.	
Vacant		December 20, 1860 – February 23, 1870	36th 37th 38th 39th 40th 41st	Civil War and Reconstruction	
George E. Harris (Hernando)	Republican	February 23, 1870 – March 3, 1873	41st 42nd	Elected in 1869 to finish the term and to the next term. Retired.	
Lucius Q. C. Lamar (Oxford)	Democratic	March 4, 1873 – March 3, 1877	43rd 44th	Elected in 1872. Re-elected in 1874. Retired to run for U.S. senator.	
Henry L. Muldrow (Starkville)	Democratic	March 4, 1877 – March 3, 1885	45th 46th 47th 48th	Elected in 1876. Re-elected in 1878. Re-elected in 1880. Re-elected in 1882. Retired to become First Assistant Secretary of the Interior.	
John Allen (Tupelo)	Democratic	March 4, 1885 – March 3, 1901	49th 50th 51st 52nd 53rd 54th 55th 56th	Elected in 1884. Re-elected in 1886. Re-elected in 1888. Re-elected in 1890. Re-elected in 1892. Re-elected in 1894. Re-elected in 1896. Re-elected in 1898. Retired.	
Ezekiel S. Candler Jr. (Corinth)	Democratic	March 4, 1901 – March 3, 1921	57th 58th 59th 60th 61st 62nd 63rd 64th 65th 66th	Elected in 1900. Re-elected in 1902. Re-elected in 1904. Re-elected in 1906. Re-elected in 1908. Re-elected in 1910. Re-elected in 1912. Re-elected in 1914. Re-elected in 1916. Re-elected in 1918. Lost renomination.	
John Rankin (Tupelo)	Democratic	March 4, 1921 – January 3, 1953	67th 68th 69th 70th 71st 72nd 73rd 74th 75th 76th 77th 78th 79th 80th 81st 82nd	Elected in 1920. Re-elected in 1922. Re-elected in 1924. Re-elected in 1926. Re-elected in 1928. Re-elected in 1930. Re-elected in 1932. Re-elected in 1934. Re-elected in 1936. Re-elected in 1938. Re-elected in 1940. Re-elected in 1942. Re-elected in 1944. Re-elected in 1946. Re-elected in 1948. Re-elected in 1950. Lost renomination.	
Thomas Abernethy (Okolona)	Democratic	January 3, 1953 – January 3, 1973	83rd 84th 85th 86th 87th 88th 89th 90th 91st 92nd	Redistricted from the 4th district and re-elected in 1952. Re-elected in 1954. Re-elected in 1956. Re-elected in 1958. Re-elected in 1960. Re-elected in 1962. Re-elected in 1964. Re-elected in 1966. Re-elected in 1968. Re-elected in 1970. Retired.	
Jamie Whitten (Charleston)	Democratic	January 3, 1973 – January 3, 1995	93rd 94th 95th 96th 97th 98th 99th 100th 101st 102nd 103rd	Redistricted from the 2nd district and re-elected in 1972. Re-elected in 1974. Re-elected in 1976. Re-elected in 1978. Re-elected in 1980. Re-elected in 1982. Re-elected in 1984. Re-elected in 1986. Re-elected in 1988. Re-elected in 1990. Re-elected in 1992. Retired.	
Roger Wicker (Tupelo)	Republican	January 3, 1995 – December 31, 2007	104th 105th 106th 107th 108th 109th 110th	Elected in 1994. Re-elected in 1996. Re-elected in 1998. Re-elected in 2000. Re-elected in 2002. Re-elected in 2004. Re-elected in 2006. Resigned after being appointed U.S. senator.	
Roger Wicker (Tupelo)	Republican	January 3, 1995 – December 31, 2007	104th 105th 106th 107th 108th 109th 110th	Elected in 1994. Re-elected in 1996. Re-elected in 1998. Re-elected in 2000. Re-elected in 2002. Re-elected in 2004. Re-elected in 2006. Resigned after being appointed U.S. senator.	2003–2013
Vacant		December 31, 2007 – May 13, 2008	110th		2003–2013
Travis Childers (Booneville)	Democratic	May 13, 2008 – January 3, 2011	110th 111th	Elected to finish Wicker's term. Re-elected in 2008. Lost re-election.	2003–2013
Alan Nunnelee (Tupelo)	Republican	January 3, 2011 – February 6, 2015	112th 113th 114th	Elected in 2010. Re-elected in 2012. Re-elected in 2014. Died.	2003–2013
Alan Nunnelee (Tupelo)	Republican	January 3, 2011 – February 6, 2015	112th 113th 114th	Elected in 2010. Re-elected in 2012. Re-elected in 2014. Died.	2013–2023
Vacant		February 6, 2015 – June 2, 2015	114th		2013–2023
Trent Kelly (Saltillo)	Republican	June 2, 2015 – present	114th 115th 116th 117th 118th 119th	Elected to finish Nunnelee's term. Re-elected in 2016. Re-elected in 2018. Re-elected in 2020. Re-elected in 2022. Re-elected in 2024. Re-elected in 2026.	2013–2023
Trent Kelly (Saltillo)	Republican	June 2, 2015 – present	114th 115th 116th 117th 118th 119th	Elected to finish Nunnelee's term. Re-elected in 2016. Re-elected in 2018. Re-elected in 2020. Re-elected in 2022. Re-elected in 2024. Re-elected in 2026.	2023–present

== Recent election results ==
=== 2012 ===
Mississippi's 1st congressional district, 2012
Party	Candidate	Votes	%
Republican	Alan Nunnelee (incumbent)	186,760	60.4
Democratic	Brad Morris	114,076	36.9
Libertarian	Danny Bedwell	3,584	1.2
Constitution	Jim R. Bourland	2,390	0.8
Reform	Chris Potts	2,367	0.8
Total votes		309,177	100.0
Republican hold			

=== 2014 ===
Mississippi's 1st congressional district, 2014
Party	Candidate	Votes	%
Republican	Alan Nunnelee (incumbent)	102,622	67.9
Democratic	Ron Dickey	43,713	28.9
Libertarian	Danny Bedwell	3,830	2.6
Reform	Lajena Walley	946	0.6
Total votes		151,111	100.0
Republican hold			

=== 2015 special election ===
Mississippi's 1st congressional district special general election, 2015
Party	Candidate	Votes	%
Nonpartisan	Walter Zinn	15,385	17.41
Nonpartisan	Trent Kelly	14,418	16.32
Nonpartisan	Mike Tagert	11,231	12.71
Nonpartisan	Greg Pirkle	7,142	8.08
Nonpartisan	Starner Jones	6,993	7.91
Nonpartisan	Chip Mills	6,929	7.84
Nonpartisan	Henry Ross	4,313	4.88
Nonpartisan	Boyce Adams	4,037	4.57
Nonpartisan	Nancy Adams Collins	4,006	4.53
Nonpartisan	Sam Adcock	4,000	4.53
Nonpartisan	Ed "Doc" Holliday	3,958	4.48
Nonpartisan	Quentin Whitwell	3,124	3.56
Nonpartisan	Daniel Sparks	2,828	3.20
Total votes		88,364	100.0

Mississippi's 1st congressional district special runoff election, 2015
Party	Candidate	Votes	%
Nonpartisan	Trent Kelly	69,516	69.97
Nonpartisan	Walter Zinn	29,831	30.03
Total votes		99,347	100
Republican hold			

=== 2016 ===
Mississippi's 1st congressional district, 2016
Party	Candidate	Votes	%
Republican	Trent Kelly (incumbent)	206,455	68.7
Democratic	Jacob Owens	83,947	27.9
Libertarian	Chase Wilson	6,181	2.1
Reform	Cathy Toole	3,840	1.3
Total votes		300,123	100.0
Republican hold			

=== 2018 ===
Mississippi's 1st congressional district, 2018
Party	Candidate	Votes	%
Republican	Trent Kelly (incumbent)	158,245	66.9
Democratic	Randy Wadkins	76,601	32.4
Reform	Tracella Lou O'Hara Hil	1,675	0.7
Total votes		236,521	100.0
Republican hold			

=== 2020 ===
Mississippi's 1st congressional district, 2020
Party	Candidate	Votes	%
Republican	Trent Kelly (incumbent)	228,787	68.7
Democratic	Antonia Eliason	104,008	31.3
Total votes		332,795	100.0
Republican hold			

=== 2022 ===
Mississippi's 1st congressional district, 2022
Party	Candidate	Votes	%
Republican	Trent Kelly (incumbent)	122,151	72.97
Democratic	Dianne Black	45,238	27.03
Total votes		167,389	100.00
Republican hold			

=== 2024 ===
Mississippi's 1st congressional district, 2024
Party	Candidate	Votes	%
Republican	Trent Kelly (incumbent)	223,589	69.81
Democratic	Dianne Black	96,697	30.19
Total votes		320,286	100.00
Republican hold			

== See also ==
- Mississippi's congressional districts
- List of United States congressional districts
