= Steve Holland (politician) =

American politician

Member of the Mississippi House of Representatives from the 16th district
- In office January 1985 – January 2020
- Preceded by: A.C. "Butch" Lambert, Sr.
- Succeeded by: Rickey W. Thompson

Personal details
- Born: November 5, 1955 (age 70) Tupelo, Mississippi, U.S.
- Party: Independent (since 2020); Democratic (until 2020)
- Education: Mississippi State University

Daniel Stephen Holland (born November 5, 1955) is an American politician who was a member of the Mississippi House of Representatives from 1985 to 2020, representing the 16th district. He was also a contender for the Democratic nomination in 2008 Mississippi's 1st congressional district special election, but he lost the primary runoff to Travis Childers.

== Family, education, and career ==
Steve Holland was born on November 5, 1955. His father was a farmer and his mother, Sadie Holland, was active in local politics.

Holland attended Mississippi State University.

Because his father was a part-owner of a local funeral home, he was able to get a job there when he was young. He worked as a funeral director for more than 40 years. He saw his work as an undertaker as being a type of local ministry or public service, especially for poorer families, to whom he offered some services on a sliding scale. He also believed that helping families during the grieving process helped his political career, as it brought him into contact with thousands of potential voters.

While serving as the elected county judge, his mother was targeted in the 2013 ricin letters incident, but she was unharmed. James Everett Dutschke pled guilty to sending the ricin letters.

== Mississippi House ==
Early in his career, Holland helped pass legislation supporting organ donations in Mississippi.

In 2007, he was instrumental to the passage of a "trigger" bill which would ban abortions in the state of Mississippi, should the Supreme Court of the United States overturn its decision in Roe v. Wade, commenting that "he was 'fed up' with the multiple 'nit picky' bills anti-abortion advocates were trying to pass to limit abortions in the state. 'I thought we will settle this once and for all (by introducing legislation to ban abortions if Roe was overturned.) You don’t have to introduce another bill.'"

James Everett Dutschke, who later targeted Holland's mother in the 2013 ricin letters incident, unsuccessfully ran against Holland in 2007.

In 2012, Holland submitted a Bill to the Mississippi Legislature to change the name of the Gulf of Mexico—for all official uses within the state—to the "Gulf of America". This bill is a reflection of Holland's sense of humor, and is his way of criticizing the priorities of the Republicans in the House. However, President Donald Trump did rename the Gulf of Mexico to the "Gulf of America" in U.S. federal usage 13 years later. Holland also co-sponsored a bill in 2017 to donate $1 million to President Trump's proposed border wall, the same year when Mississippi's operating budget was $300 million short.

=== Career end ===
In March 2017, Holland announced that his doctors had diagnosed him with dementia, and that he would not seek re-election at the end of his term in 2019. However, in 2019 Holland announced that he would seek his 10th term for the State Legislature as an independent. He was defeated by Democratic candidate Rickey W. Thompson.

Holland's switch in party affiliation was speculated to be an attempt at avoiding a defeat to Thompson in the Democratic primaries, with the Daily Journal noting that Holland had "outspokenly identified as liberal" and, if victorious as an independent, would have nonetheless been "certain to caucus with Democrats."

== Filmography ==
List of documentary films
Year	Title	Role	Ref(s)
2024	The Kings of Tupelo: A Southern Crime Saga	Himself	
