= Greg Davis (Mississippi politician) =

American politician

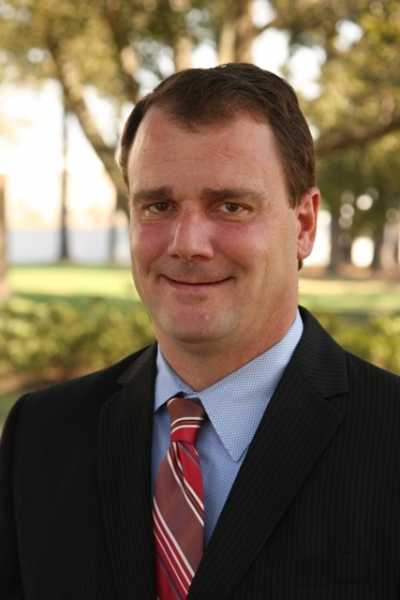

Mayor of Southaven, Mississippi
- In office 1997–2013
- Preceded by: Joe Cates
- Succeeded by: Darren Musselwhite

Member of the Mississippi House of Representatives from the 7th district
- In office 1991–1997
- Preceded by: John Grisham
- Succeeded by: Wanda Taylor Jennings

Personal details
- Born: Charles Gregory Davis; February 22, 1966 (age 60) Memphis, Tennessee, U.S.
- Party: Republican
- Children: 3
- Education: Mississippi State University
- Profession: Engineer, politician

Charles Gregory Davis, known as Greg Davis (born February 22, 1966) is an American attorney and the former mayor of Southaven in northern Mississippi, the state's fourth largest city, from 1997 to 2013. Prior to serving as mayor, he represented the 7th district in the Mississippi House of Representatives. He was the Republican Party's nominee for Mississippi's 1st congressional district in the 2008 special and general elections.

In 2012, he was convicted on charges of embezzlement, false pretense, and making fraudulent statements and was later sentenced, however his conviction was overturned in a 2017 retrial and found not guilty. Greg attended Mitchell Hamline School of Law where he received his Juris Doctor degree in December 2021. After passing the Mississippi Bar in February 2022, he was admitted to practice law in July 2022. He currently has a practice (Davis Law MS, PLLC) located in Hernando, MS.

== Life and career ==
Davis was born in Memphis, Tennessee. He graduated from Mississippi State University at Starkville with a degree in Civil Engineering. Upon graduation, he began a career in engineering and consulting.

From 1991 to 1997, Davis served in the Mississippi House of Representatives with assignments to the Appropriations and Public Health committees. He was elected mayor of Southaven in 1997 and won a fourth term in 2009. On June 4, 2013, Davis lost his bid for a fifth term as mayor of Southaven and was succeeded by Darren Musselwhite, effective June 28, 2013.

== Congressional elections, 2008 ==
In 2008, he began a campaign to fill the seat of U.S. Representative Roger Wicker, who had been appointed to the United States Senate following the resignation of Trent Lott. The initial primary was a three-candidate race which resulted in a primary runoff between Davis and former mayor Glenn McCullough of Tupelo. Davis won the runoff and thus became the Republican candidate in the special election.

In the initial special election on April 22 for Mississippi's 1st congressional district, Davis paced second to Democrat Travis Childers, but no candidate received a majority of the vote required to win the seat outright. Childers and Davis then faced each other in a May 13 runoff. Childers defeated Davis, 53.7 to 46.3 percent.

Childers filled the seat until the general election held on November 4, 2008, corresponding with the Obama-McCain presidential contest. As the Republican nominee once more, Davis again faced Childers and again lost, 54 to 44 percent.

== Expense abuse investigation ==
In December 2012, Davis was indicted on state charges of embezzlement, false pretense and making fraudulent statements. He was arrested and released on $3,500 bail. He was convicted and sentenced in July 2014 to serve 2 1/2 years in state prison and pay more than $17,000 to the city. In a 2017 retrial, Davis was found not guilty of all charges, overturning his previous conviction.

== Personal life ==
Following an investigation by state auditors into questionable reimbursements, which included a purchase at Priape, a Toronto shop specializing in gay-interest merchandise, on December 15, 2011, Davis publicly acknowledged that he is gay, stating:

At this point in my life and in my career, while I have tried to maintain separation between my personal and public life, it is obvious that this can no longer remain the case. While I have performed my job as mayor, in my opinion, as a very conservative, progressive individual — and still continue to be a very conservative individual — I think that it is important that I discuss the struggles I have had over the last few years when I came to the realization that I am gay. The only apology I would make to my supporters if they are upset is the fact that I was not honest enough with myself to be honest with them. But I have lived my life in public service for 20-plus years, and in order for me to remain sane and move on, I have got to start being honest about who I am.

== See also ==
- Mississippi's 1st congressional district
- Mississippi's 1st congressional district special election, 2008
- United States House of Representatives elections in Mississippi, 2008#District 1
