= Chad McMahan =

American businessman and politician

Member of the Mississippi State Senate from the 6th district
- Incumbent
- Assumed office January 5, 2016
- Preceded by: Nancy Collins

Personal details
- Born: William Chad McMahan; January 28, 1972 (age 54) Tupelo, Mississippi, U.S.
- Party: Republican
- Spouse: Allison Clayton
- Children: 1
- Education: Union University
- Occupation: Sales representative

William Chad McMahan is an American businessman and politician, serving as a Republican member of the Mississippi State Senate for the 6th district, which includes parts of Itawamba and Lee counties.

== Early life ==
Chad McMahan was born and educated at the Tupelo High School in Tupelo, Mississippi in 1990. He graduated from Union University in Jackson, Tennessee in 1995.

== Career ==
McMahan worked for Great Southern Industries, a packaging company, for two decades.

McMahan was an alderman in Guntown, Mississippi. Since January 2016, he has served as a Republican member of the Mississippi State Senate, representing District 6, which includes most of Lee County and parts of Itawamba County, Mississippi.

== Personal life ==
McMahan is married to Nicky Clayton, and they have a son. They reside in Guntown, and he attends the North Star Baptist Church in Saltillo, Mississippi.
