= Rickey W. Thompson =

Mississippi state representative

Member of the Mississippi House of Representatives from the 16th district
- Incumbent
- Assumed office January 2020
- Preceded by: Steve Holland

Personal details
- Born: June 30, 1964 (age 62) Shannon, Mississippi, U.S.
- Party: Democratic

Rickey W. Thompson (born June 30, 1964) is an American licensed practical nurse and Democratic politician. He has served in the Mississippi House of Representatives since 2020, representing the state's 16th House district.

== Biography ==
Rickey W. Thompson was born on June 30, 1964, in Shannon, Mississippi. In 2019, he was elected to represent Mississippi's 16th House District (parts of Lee and Monroe Counties) as a Democrat in the Mississippi House of Representatives, and started serving in 2020.
