= 2008 United States Senate special election in Mississippi =

- November 4, 2008
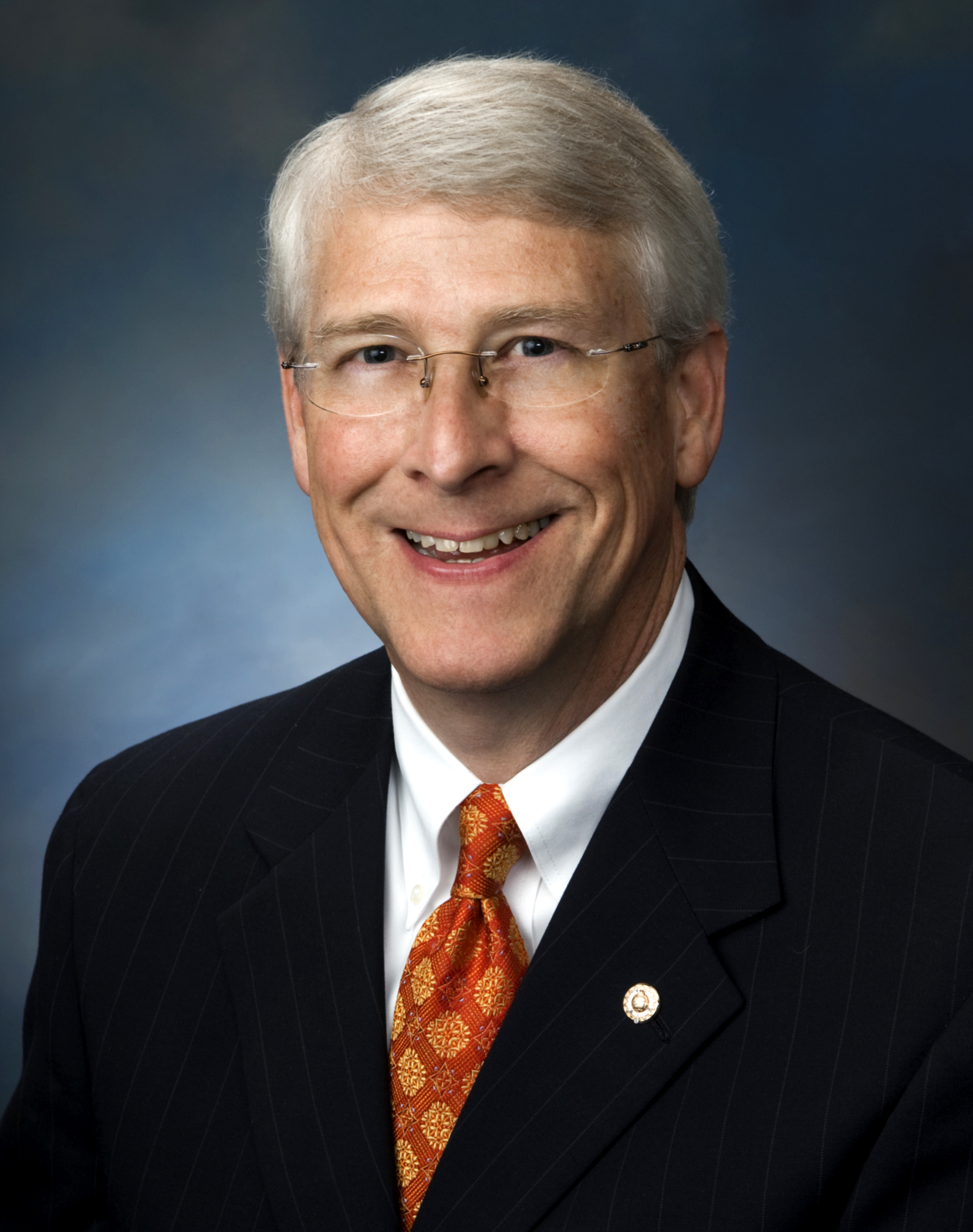

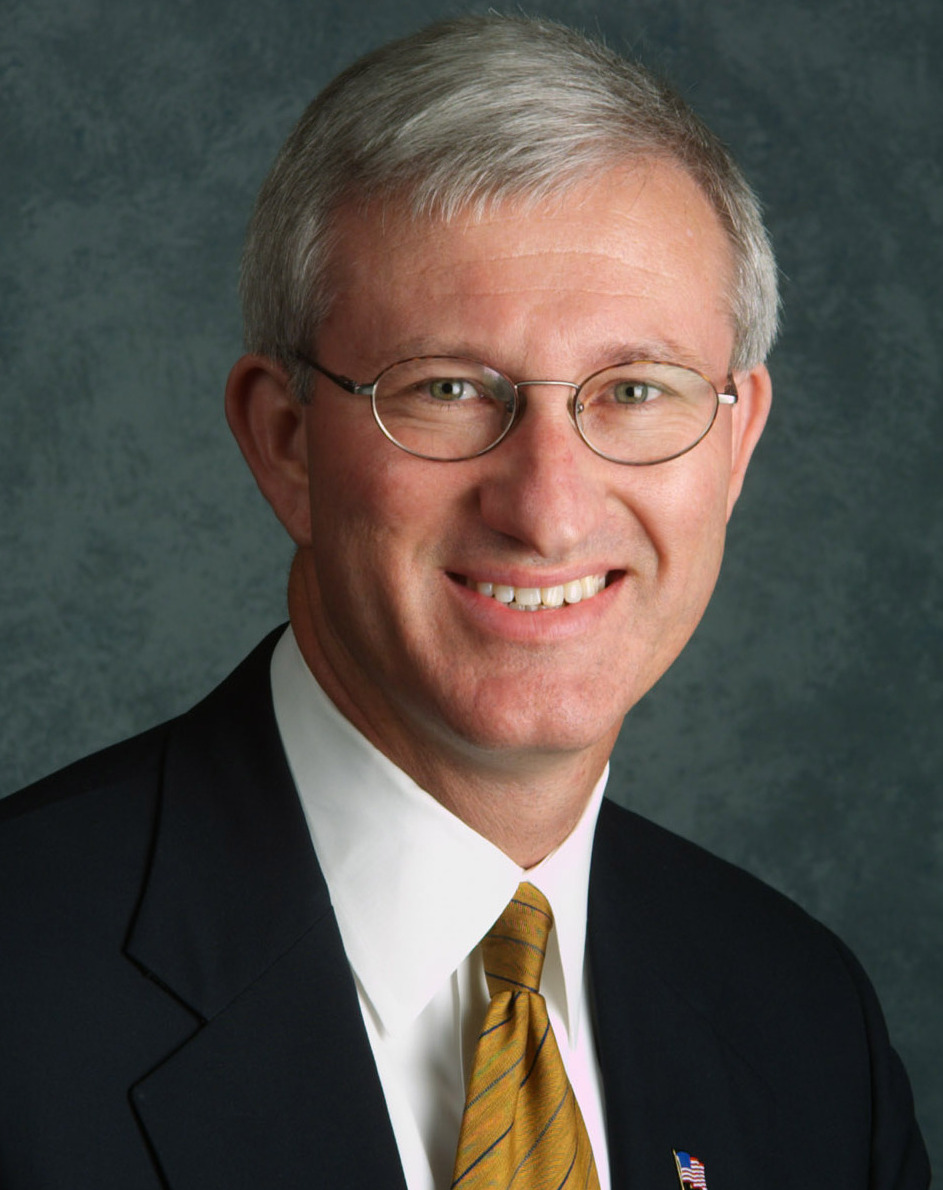
Nominee	Roger Wicker	Ronnie Musgrove
Party	Republican	Democratic
Popular vote	683,409	560,064
Percentage	54.96%	45.04%
- Wicker: 50–60% 60–70% 70–80% 80–90% >90% Musgrove: 50–60% 60–70% 70–80% 80–90% >90%
U.S. senator before election
Roger Wicker
Republican
Elected U.S. Senator
Roger Wicker
Republican

The 2008 United States Senate special election in Mississippi was held on November 4, 2008. This election was held on the same day of Thad Cochran's re-election bid in the regularly scheduled Class II election. The winner of this special election served the rest of the Senate term, which ended in January 2013. Unlike most Senate elections, this was a non-partisan election in which the candidate who got a majority of the vote won, and if the first-place candidate did not get 50%, a runoff election with the top two candidates would have been held. In the election, no runoff was necessary as Republican nominee and incumbent Republican U.S. Senator Roger Wicker won election to finish the term.

== Background ==
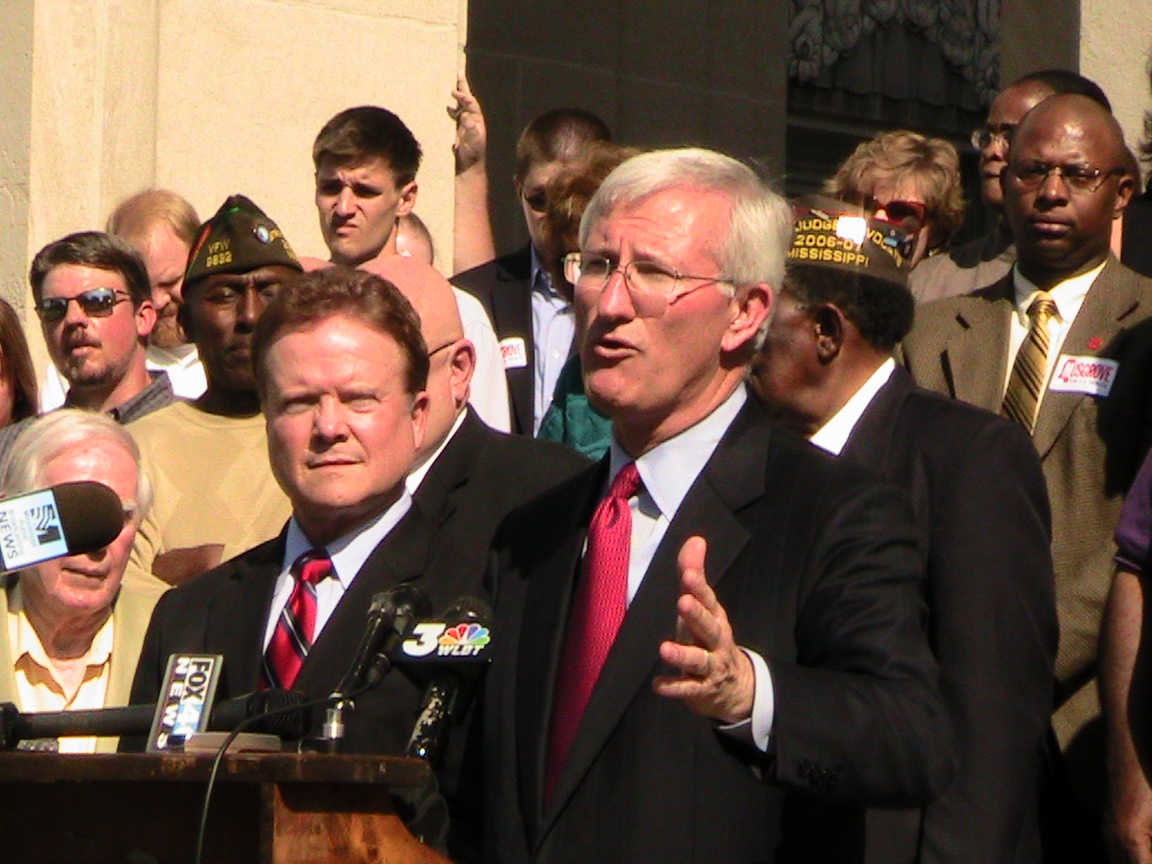
Musgrove campaigning for Senate with Jim Webb in Jackson, Mississippi

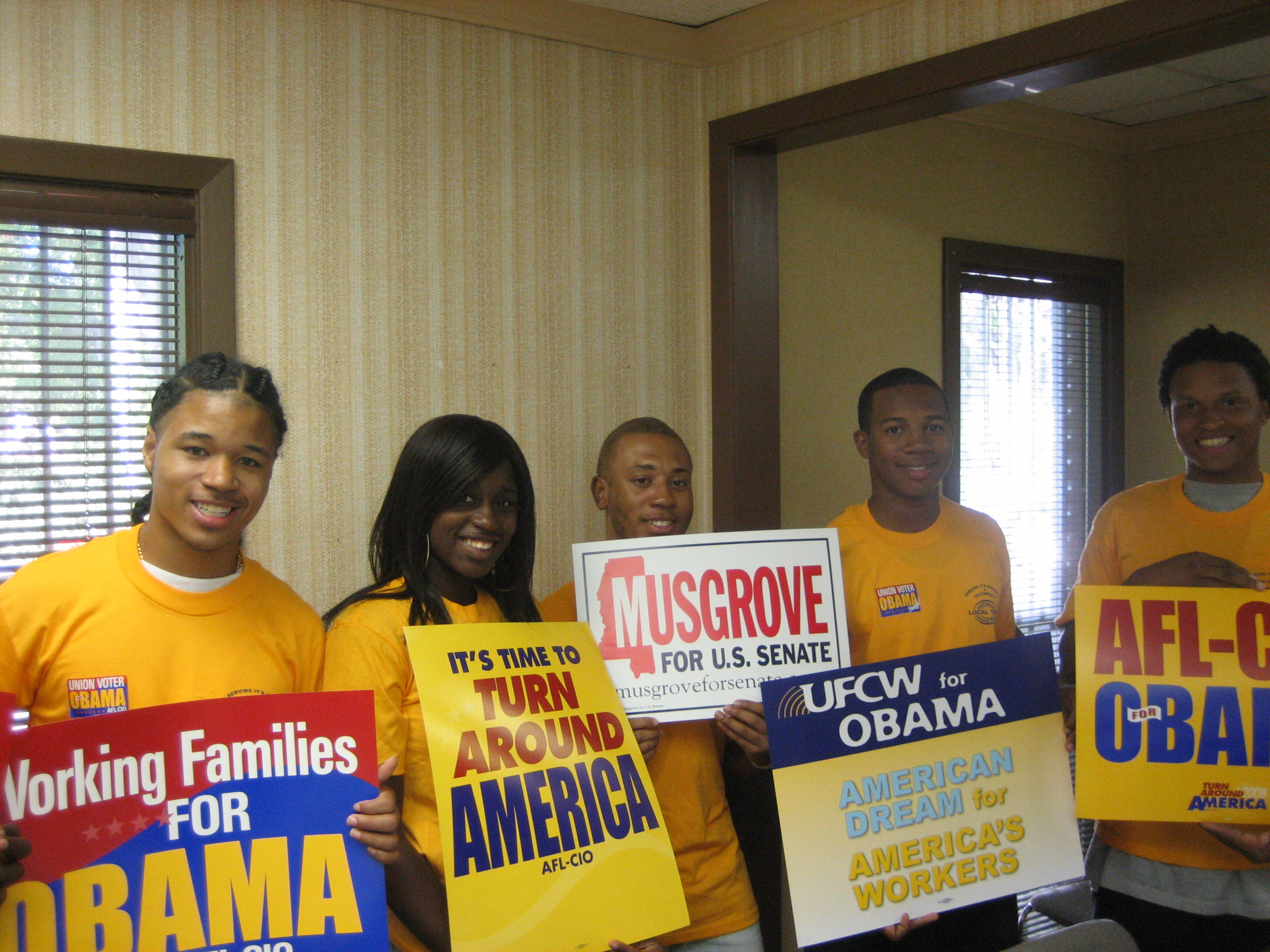
Supporters of Musgrove's senate campaign

On December 18, 2007, U.S. Senator Trent Lott resigned in his fourth term to pursue "something else" in the private sector. He ended up starting his own lobbying firm.

Mississippi law stated that the governor of Mississippi had ten days after receiving official notification of the vacancy to appoint an interim senator pending a special election. On December 31, thirteen days after Lott's resignation, Governor Haley Barbour appointed U.S. Representative Roger Wicker.

=== Scheduling lawsuit ===
Barbour scheduled the special election for November 4, 2008. Mississippi Attorney General Jim Hood, a member of the Democratic Party, issued a non-binding opinion that the election must be held within one hundred days of Lott's resignation (no later than March 30, 2008), and sued Barbour in Hinds County Circuit Court, arguing that Barbour had 10 days to set a special election within 90 days (no later than March 29, 2008). Hood argued the date of the special election to be March 11, the same day as Mississippi's presidential primary. Governor Barbour claimed that the definition of "year" in the law in question is 365 days. Mississippi Secretary of State Eric Clark, the state's chief elections officer and a fellow Democrat, backed the governor's position.

Judge Bobby DeLaughter ruled that the election must take place no later than March 19. On February 6, 2008, after Barbour appealed to the Mississippi Supreme Court, which reversed Judge Delaughter and ruled that the non-partisan special election may be held on November 4.

== General election ==
=== Candidates ===
Note: Mississippi special elections are nonpartisan. Party labels are for informational purposes only.

- Ronnie Musgrove, former Governor (Democratic)
- Roger Wicker, incumbent U.S. senator (Republican)

==== Withdrew ====
- Ronnie Shows, former U.S. representative from Bassfield (Democratic) (withdrew February 19, 2008) (endorsed Musgrove)

==== Declined ====
- Mike Espy, former U.S. secretary of agriculture and U.S. representative from Yazoo City (Democratic)
- Harvey Johnson Jr., former mayor of Jackson (Democratic)
- Mike Moore, former Mississippi attorney general (Democratic)

Former Governor Ronnie Musgrove, former U.S. Representative and Secretary of Agriculture Mike Espy, former Jackson mayor Harvey Johnson, Jr., former Governor Ray Mabus, and former Mississippi Attorney General Mike Moore were all considered potential Democratic candidates. Of the five, only Musgrove decided to run. Former Congressman Ronnie Shows also decided to run, but withdrew on February 19, 2008, after determining that he could not raise enough funds to effectively campaign against Wicker and Musgrove. Shows gave his endorsement to Musgrove.

=== Predictions ===
Source	Ranking	As of
The Cook Political Report	Tossup	October 23, 2008
CQ Politics	Lean R	October 31, 2008
Rothenberg Political Report	Lean R	November 2, 2008
Real Clear Politics	Lean R	October 29, 2008

=== Polling ===
Poll Source	Date(s) administered	Ronnie Musgrove	Roger Wicker
Rasmussen Reports	October 27, 2008	43%	54%
Rasmussen Reports	September 30, 2008	47%	49%
Rasmussen Reports	August 23, 2008	42%	47%
Rasmussen Reports	July 28, 2008	42%	48%
Rasmussen Reports	June 26, 2008	47%	48%
Rasmussen Reports	May 27, 2008	47%	46%

=== Results ===
2008 United States Senate special election in Mississippi
Party	Candidate	Votes	%	±%
Nonpartisan	Roger Wicker (incumbent)	683,409	54.96%	−8.62%
Nonpartisan	Ronnie Musgrove	560,064	45.04%	+10.17%
Total votes		1,243,473	100.00%	N/A
Republican hold				

==== By county ====
County	Roger Wicker Republican		Ronnie Musgrove Democratic		Margin		Total
County	#	%	#	%	#	%	Total
Adams	5,942	39.65%	9,043	60.35%	-3,101	-20.69%	14,985
Alcorn	9,624	66.07%	4,942	33.93%	4,682	32.14%	14,566
Amite	3,821	52.56%	3,449	47.44%	372	5.12%	7,270
Attala	4,922	55.66%	3,921	44.34%	1,001	11.32%	8,843
Benton	2,270	51.70%	2,121	48.30%	149	3.39%	4,391
Bolivar	5,062	35.05%	9,380	64.95%	-4,318	-29.90%	14,442
Calhoun	4,386	64.00%	2,467	36.00%	1,919	28.00%	6,853
Carroll	3,704	64.06%	2,078	35.94%	1,626	28.12%	5,782
Chickasaw	4,299	49.14%	4,450	50.86%	-151	-1.73%	8,749
Choctaw	2,602	66.26%	1,325	33.74%	1,277	32.52%	3,927
Claiborne	1,102	20.80%	4,195	79.20%	-3,093	-58.39%	5,297
Clarke	4,782	58.81%	3,349	41.19%	1,433	17.62%	8,131
Clay	4,813	45.29%	5,815	54.71%	-1,002	-9.43%	10,628
Coahoma	3,046	31.06%	6,760	68.94%	-3,714	-37.87%	9,806
Copiah	6,397	45.71%	7,597	54.29%	-1,200	-8.58%	13,994
Covington	5,033	54.73%	4,163	45.27%	970	9.46%	9,196
DeSoto	41,363	66.77%	20,585	33.23%	20,778	33.54%	61,948
Forrest	14,621	55.82%	11,574	44.18%	3,047	11.63%	26,195
Franklin	2,604	56.87%	1,975	43.13%	629	13.74%	4,579
George	5,838	65.05%	3,137	34.95%	2,701	30.09%	8,975
Greene	3,479	61.22%	2,204	38.78%	1,275	22.44%	5,683
Grenada	5,993	55.37%	4,830	44.63%	1,163	10.75%	10,823
Hancock	10,373	63.43%	5,981	36.57%	4,392	26.86%	16,354
Harrison	35,457	59.03%	24,608	40.97%	10,849	18.06%	60,065
Hinds	35,743	33.95%	69,536	66.05%	-33,793	-32.10%	105,279
Holmes	2,145	23.84%	6,852	76.16%	-4,707	-52.32%	8,997
Humphreys	1,593	32.11%	3,368	67.89%	-1,775	-35.78%	4,961
Issaquena	379	42.20%	519	57.80%	-140	-15.59%	898
Itawamba	6,790	69.99%	2,912	30.01%	3,878	39.97%	9,702
Jackson	32,449	62.05%	19,847	37.95%	12,602	24.10%	52,296
Jasper	3,816	42.66%	5,130	57.34%	-1,314	-14.69%	8,946
Jefferson	826	19.00%	3,522	81.00%	-2,696	-62.01%	4,348
Jefferson Davis	2,775	39.07%	4,328	60.93%	-1,553	-21.86%	7,103
Jones	18,066	63.05%	10,589	36.95%	7,477	26.09%	28,655
Kemper	1,941	38.57%	3,092	61.43%	-1,151	-22.87%	5,033
Lafayette	10,656	60.04%	7,092	39.96%	3,564	20.08%	17,748
Lamar	17,119	73.21%	6,266	26.79%	10,853	46.41%	23,385
Lauderdale	18,846	59.37%	12,898	40.63%	5,948	18.74%	31,744
Lawrence	3,803	56.17%	2,967	43.83%	836	12.35%	6,770
Leake	4,695	51.76%	4,375	48.24%	320	3.53%	9,070
Lee	22,375	64.95%	12,074	35.05%	10,301	29.90%	34,449
Leflore	4,206	33.28%	8,433	66.72%	-4,227	-33.44%	12,639
Lincoln	9,768	60.62%	6,345	39.38%	3,423	21.24%	16,113
Lowndes	14,489	55.27%	11,727	44.73%	2,762	10.54%	26,216
Madison	26,920	58.78%	18,874	41.22%	8,046	17.57%	45,794
Marion	7,729	60.78%	4,987	39.22%	2,742	21.56%	12,716
Marshall	7,191	47.56%	7,928	52.44%	-737	-4.87%	15,119
Monroe	9,752	57.70%	7,148	42.30%	2,604	15.41%	16,900
Montgomery	2,980	54.36%	2,502	45.64%	478	8.72%	5,482
Neshoba	7,384	66.18%	3,773	33.82%	3,611	32.37%	11,157
Newton	6,166	64.42%	3,406	35.58%	2,760	28.83%	9,572
Noxubee	1,853	29.42%	4,445	70.58%	-2,592	-41.16%	6,298
Oktibbeha	9,891	55.06%	8,073	44.94%	1,818	10.12%	17,964
Panola	7,192	45.74%	8,533	54.26%	-1,341	-8.53%	15,725
Pearl River	13,762	64.63%	7,532	35.37%	6,230	29.26%	21,294
Perry	3,487	64.05%	1,957	35.95%	1,530	28.10%	5,444
Pike	8,139	46.65%	9,307	53.35%	-1,168	-6.69%	17,446
Pontotoc	9,230	73.68%	3,297	26.32%	5,933	47.36%	12,527
Prentiss	6,652	62.94%	3,917	37.06%	2,735	25.88%	10,569
Quitman	1,427	37.08%	2,421	62.92%	-994	-25.83%	3,848
Rankin	45,488	73.54%	16,363	26.46%	29,125	47.09%	61,851
Scott	6,019	53.60%	5,210	46.40%	809	7.20%	11,229
Sharkey	920	34.28%	1,764	65.72%	-844	-31.45%	2,684
Simpson	6,844	56.50%	5,269	43.50%	1,575	13.00%	12,113
Smith	5,480	67.86%	2,595	32.14%	2,885	35.73%	8,075
Stone	4,384	63.10%	2,564	36.90%	1,820	26.19%	6,948
Sunflower	3,462	32.15%	7,307	67.85%	-3,845	-35.70%	10,769
Tallahatchie	2,788	42.18%	3,821	57.82%	-1,033	-15.63%	6,609
Tate	7,196	59.41%	4,916	40.59%	2,280	18.82%	12,112
Tippah	6,315	67.20%	3,082	32.80%	3,233	34.40%	9,397
Tishomingo	5,477	67.33%	2,657	32.67%	2,820	34.67%	8,134
Tunica	1,261	32.34%	2,638	67.66%	-1,377	-35.32%	3,899
Union	8,082	67.56%	3,880	32.44%	4,202	35.13%	11,962
Walthall	3,822	51.20%	3,643	48.80%	179	2.40%	7,465
Warren	10,844	51.75%	10,109	48.25%	735	3.51%	20,953
Washington	6,442	34.87%	12,033	65.13%	-5,591	-30.26%	18,475
Wayne	5,204	53.80%	4,469	46.20%	735	7.60%	9,673
Webster	3,800	71.70%	1,500	28.30%	2,300	43.40%	5,300
Wilkinson	1,531	33.19%	3,082	66.81%	-1,551	-33.62%	4,613
Winston	5,344	53.71%	4,605	46.29%	739	7.43%	9,949
Yalobusha	3,684	55.12%	3,000	44.88%	684	10.23%	6,684
Yazoo	5,254	48.25%	5,636	51.75%	-382	-3.51%	10,890
Totals	683,409	54.96%	560,064	45.04%	123,345	9.92%	1,243,473

==== Counties that flipped from Republican to Democratic ====
- Adams (largest city: Natchez)
- Chickasaw (largest city: Houston)
- Clay (largest city: West Point)
- Copiah (largest city: Hazlehurst)
- Jasper (largest city: Bay Springs)
- Kemper (largest city: De Kalb)
- LeFlore (largest city: Greenwood)
- Panola (largest city: Batesville)
- Pike (largest city: McComb)
- Tallahatchie (largest city: Charleston)
- Yazoo (largest city: Yazoo City)

=== By congressional district ===
Wicker won three of four congressional districts, including two that elected Democrats.

District	Wicker	Musgrove	Representative
1st	61%	39%	Travis Childers
2nd	36%	64%	Bennie Thompson
3rd	59%	41%	Chip Pickering (110th Congress)
3rd	59%	41%	Gregg Harper (111th Congress)
4th	62%	38%	Gene Taylor

== See also ==
- 2008 United States Senate elections
- Mississippi's 1st congressional district special election, 2008, an election to fill Roger Wicker's former U.S. House of Representatives seat
