= Craven Crowell =

Energy and economic development administrator

Chair of the Tennessee Valley Authority
- In office 1993–2001
- President: Bill Clinton
- Preceded by: John B Waters
- Succeeded by: Glenn McCullough

Personal details
- Born: August 27, 1943 (age 83) Nashville, Tennessee
- Spouse: Fredricka (Freddie) Crowell
- Children: One
- Education: Lipscomb University (BA)
- Website: cravencrowell.com

Craven H. Crowell Jr. (born August 27, 1943, in Nashville, Tennessee) is an energy and economic development administrator. He has served in leadership positions in the energy industry, including eight years as chairman of the three-member board of the Tennessee Valley Authority (TVA), appointed by Bill Clinton and confirmed by the U.S. Senate in 1993.

He was named Alumnus of the Year by Lipscomb University in 1995.

== Early life ==
Crowell was born and raised in Nashville, Tennessee. He attended Lipscomb University, where he received a bachelor's degree in 1965. While in college, Crowell was president of the Lipscomb chapter of Pi Delta Epsilon, a collegiate journalism fraternity. He was a reporter and city editor with the Nashville Tennessean and won the National Headliner Award for Investigative Reporting in 1969. He then became the press secretary of U.S. Senator Jim Sasser of Tennessee. During this time, Crowell served in the United States Marine Corps and was a commissioned officer in the Naval Reserve.

In 1980, he was appointed the director of Information and vice president of Tennessee Valley Authority and served in this position until 1989. In 1989, he left TVA to serve as the chief of staff for Sasser.

== Tennessee Valley Authority ==
Crowell was appointed as the chairman of the three-member board of directors of TVA in 1993 by President Clinton. During his tenure, TVA focused primarily on upgrading its operational systems, including management of the Tennessee River, achieving excellence in its nuclear power program and strengthening its financial position, including reducing its debt by more than $1.7 billion after continuous increases for 35 years. TVA launched its first green power renewable energy program. Also during his tenure, TVA completed construction on the first unit at Watts Bar Nuclear Plant and transferred responsibility for funding its U.S. taxpayer programs to its general budget, ending all direct taxpayer funding of TVA programs. While at TVA, Crowell served on the board of the Electric Power Research Institute (EPRI) and served a term as vice chair and chairman. He also served on the board and executive committee of the Nuclear Energy Institute (NEI).

== Later work ==
He joined Oliver Wyman, an international consulting firm, as a partner in 2004 and worked there until 2011. He subsequently served as the chairman of the board of directors of Texas Reliability Entity (TexasRE) until 2012. From 2012 to 2021, Crowell was chairman of the board of directors of the Electric Reliability Council of Texas (ERCOT).
