= Dannie Reed =

Dannie Reed (born October 19, 1951) is a former state legislator in Mississippi. A Republican, he served in the Mississippi House of Representatives from 2005 to 2012. He was succeeded by Joey Hood.

Reed was born in Louisville, Mississippi. He attended East Central Mississippi Community College and Mississippi State University. In 2011, he campaigned to be elected Mississippi Agriculture Commissioner, but lost.
