= 2008 Mississippi's 1st congressional district special election =

- April 22 and May 13, 2008

Mississippi's 1st congressional district
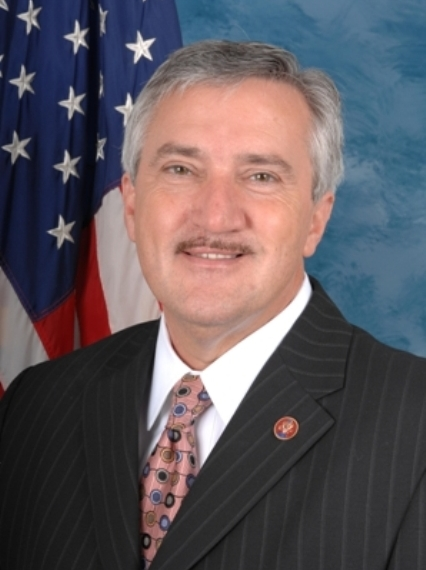

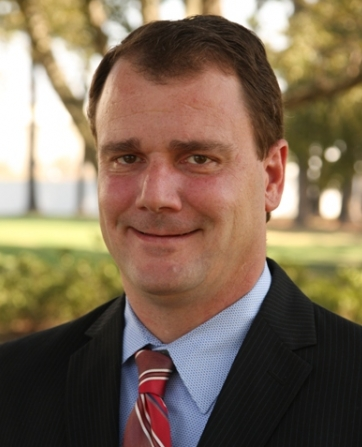
Nominee	Travis Childers	Greg Davis
Party	Democratic	Republican
Popular vote	58,037	49,877
Percentage	53.78%	46.22%
- Runoff county results Childers: 50–60% 60–70% 70–80% 80–90% Davis: 50–60% 70–80%
U.S. Representative before election
Roger Wicker
Republican
Elected U.S. Representative
Travis Childers
Democratic

The 2008 Mississippi 1st congressional district special election was a special election in the state of Mississippi to determine who would serve the remainder of former Representative Roger Wicker's term. After an April 22, 2008 ballot resulted in no candidate receiving a majority, Democratic Party candidate Travis Childers defeated Republican candidate Greg Davis in a runoff election on May 13, 2008.

== Democratic primary ==
=== Candidates ===
- Travis Childers, Prentiss County Clerk
- Steve Holland, Mississippi State Representative
- Marshall Coleman
- Brian H. Neely
- Ken Hurt, 2006 Democratic nominee for Mississippi's 1st congressional district

=== Results ===
Democratic Primary results
Party	Candidate	Votes	%
Democratic	Travis Childers	40,919	41.41
Democratic	Steve Holland	30,274	30.63
Democratic	Marshall Coleman	12,913	13.07
Democratic	Brian Neely	10,624	10.75
Democratic	Ken Hurt	4,095	4.14
Total votes		98,825	100.00

=== Runoff Results ===
Democratic primary runoff results
Party	Candidate	Votes	%
Democratic	Travis Childers	20,797	56.58
Democratic	Steve Holland	15,958	43.42
Total votes		36,755	100.00

== Republican primary ==
=== Candidates ===
- Greg Davis, Mayor of Southaven and former Mississippi State Representative
- Glenn McCullough, former Mayor of Tupelo
- Randy Russell, ophthalmologist

=== Results ===
Republican primary results
Party	Candidate	Votes	%
Republican	Glenn McCullough	17,082	38.88
Republican	Greg Davis	16,161	36.79
Republican	Randy Russell	10,688	24.33
Total votes		43,931	100.00

=== Runoff results ===
Republican primary runoff results
Party	Candidate	Votes	%
Republican	Greg Davis	16,733	50.82
Republican	Glenn McCullough	16,196	49.18
Total votes		32,929	100.00

== General election ==
=== Candidates ===
- Travis Childers, Prentiss County Clerk (D)
- Greg Davis, Mayor of Southaven and former Mississippi State Representative
- John M. Wages Jr., former member of the Lee County Election Commission
- Wally Pang, Batesville restaurant owner

=== Campaign ===
On December 31, 2007, Mississippi governor Haley Barbour appointed Roger Wicker to the Senate seat vacated 13 days earlier by Sen. Trent Lott. At the time of his appointment, Wicker was already a U.S. Representative for Mississippi's District 1. As a result of Wicker's appointment to the Senate, his House seat became vacant, necessitating a special election to determine who would serve the remainder of Wicker's term.

Mississippi's 1st congressional district covers the northeastern part of the state, including the cities of Columbus, Grenada, Oxford, Southaven, and Tupelo. The district had been represented by Republican Roger Wicker since 1995. The district has demonstrated itself to be "reliably conservative" in past elections, with George W. Bush winning the district by 25 points in the 2004 presidential election. Early speculation had Republicans Greg Davis, Glenn McCullough, and Randy Russell and Democrats Steve Holland and Jamie Franks as contenders. All but Franks ended up as candidates.

The party primaries were held on March 11. The primary runoff election was held on April 1, 2008. According to Mississippi state election law, those who voted in the Democratic Primary on March 11 were only allowed to vote in the Democratic runoff on April 1. Mississippi was one of the states where right wing commentators such as Rush Limbaugh suggested people cross party lines on March 11 in order to keep the competition alive between Democratic presidential candidates Hillary Clinton and Barack Obama. Several websites such as the Daily Kos and politico.com suggested that this is why the Republican primary runoff was so close between the more moderate McCullough and Davis as many of the more Conservative Republicans were not allowed to vote in that runoff. It is also believed that this has led to the final special election race involving a conservative Democrat (Childers) who has a better than usual chance to win the general election. Republicans were particularly concerned that a race between Childers and McCullough would've increased the Democrat's chances.

The initial special election to fill the seat was held on April 22, 2008; no one received a majority of the vote so a runoff election was held between the two top vote getters: Democrat Travis Childers (who was the top vote getter with 49.4% of the vote) and Republican Greg Davis (who received 46.3% of the initial special election vote) on May 13, 2008.

The National Republican Congressional Committee spent over $1.3 million in support of Davis' bid for the vacant seat. Freedom's Watch, a Republican-supporting advocacy group, purchased an additional $550,000 in advertising. The Democratic Congressional Campaign Committee spent $1.5 million in support of Childers.

Despite the district's Republican leanings, Childers defeated Davis in the final round of the special election by a 54% to 46% margin. Once sworn in, Childers will serve through the end of the 110th Congress in January 2009.

Childers victory represents the 3rd time during the 110th Congress that a Democrat has been elected to a previously Republican-held seat in a special election. Childers victory is seen as a surprise upset for the Republican party as Mississippi's 1st district has been historically right leaning. It is believed that this sends "a clear signal of national problems ahead for Republicans in the fall". Negative campaign ads approved by Davis tried to link Childers with presidential candidate Barack Obama and his controversial former pastor Rev. Jeremiah Wright.

Childers and Davis faced off against each other in the November general election. Again, Childers won that contest.

=== Results ===
Mississippi's 1st Congressional District special election, 2008
Party	Candidate	Votes	%
Democratic	Travis Childers	33,304	49.44
Republican	Greg Davis	31,177	46.28
Republican	Glenn McCullough	968	1.44
Democratic	Steve Holland	789	1.17
Independent	Wally Pang	725	1.08
Green	John M. Wages, Jr.	398	0.59
Total votes		67,361	100.00

=== Runoff results ===
2008 Mississippi's 1st congressional district special runoff election
Party	Candidate	Votes	%
Democratic	Travis Childers	58,037	53.78
Republican	Greg Davis	49,877	46.22
Total votes		107,914	100.00
Democratic gain from Republican			

==== By county ====
County	Greg Davis Republican		Travis Childers Democratic		Margin		Total
County	#	%	#	%	#	%	Total
Alcorn	1,821	39.02%	2,846	60.98%	1,025	21.96%	4,667
Benton	326	28.90%	802	71.10%	476	42.20%	1,128
Calhoun	885	42.16%	1,214	57.84%	329	15.67%	2,099
Chickasaw	744	27.08%	2,003	72.92%	1,259	45.83%	2,747
Choctaw	490	47.30%	546	52.70%	56	5.41%	1,036
Clay	1,047	26.86%	2,851	73.14%	1,804	46.28%	3,898
DeSoto	15,329	74.82%	5,159	25.18%	-10,170	-49.64%	20,488
Grenada	1,672	51.07%	1,602	48.93%	-70	-2.14%	3,274
Itawamba	1,047	39.66%	1,593	60.34%	546	20.68%	2,640
Lafayette	2,287	47.32%	2,546	52.68%	259	5.36%	4,833
Lee	4,923	41.99%	6,802	58.01%	1,879	16.03%	11,725
Lowndes	3,757	45.68%	4,467	54.32%	710	8.63%	8,224
Marshall	1,605	31.58%	3,478	68.42%	1,873	36.85%	5,083
Monroe	1,869	34.23%	3,591	65.77%	1,722	31.54%	5,460
Panola	2,212	42.20%	3,030	57.80%	818	15.60%	5,242
Pontotoc	1,680	47.02%	1,893	52.98%	213	5.96%	3,573
Prentiss	914	14.71%	5,299	85.29%	4,385	70.58%	6,213
Tate	2,132	57.07%	1,604	42.93%	-528	-14.13%	3,736
Tippah	1,113	41.01%	1,601	58.99%	488	17.98%	2,714
Tishomingo	1,033	39.88%	1,557	60.12%	524	20.23%	2,590
Union	1,322	43.86%	1,692	56.14%	370	12.28%	3,014
Webster (part)	735	58.43%	523	41.57%	-212	-16.85%	1,258
Winston (part)	4	40.00%	6	60.00%	2	20.00%	10
Yalobusha	930	41.11%	1,332	58.89%	402	17.77%	2,262
Totals	49,877	46.22%	58,037	53.78%	8,160	7.56%	107,914

== Newspaper endorsements ==
Childers was endorsed by the Northeast Mississippi Daily Journal, The Commercial Dispatch, and The Commercial Appeal.

== See also ==
- 2008 United States House of Representatives elections in Mississippi
- Mississippi's 1st congressional district
- 2008 United States Senate special election in Mississippi
- 2008 Illinois's 14th congressional district special election
- 2008 Louisiana's 6th congressional district special election
