= Nancy Adams Collins =

American politician (born 1947)

Member of the Mississippi Senate from the 6th district
- In office January 12, 2011 – January 5, 2016
- Preceded by: Alan Nunnelee
- Succeeded by: Chad McMahan

Personal details
- Born: November 10, 1947 (age 78)
- Party: Republican

Nancy Adams Collins (born November 10, 1947) is an American politician in the Mississippi State Senate.

== Personal life ==
Nancy Adams Collins graduated from Tupelo High School and holds a BS degree in Speech Therapy from Mississippi University for Women and in Nursing from Itawamba Community College. She and her husband Jim, retired president and vice-chairman of BancorpSouth, are the parents of four children and have six grandchildren.

== Public service ==
Nancy Adams Collins is the founding president of Sanctuary Hospice house, which was named by Congress as a National Demonstration Project. In 2008, her advocacy efforts earned her the Jefferson Award for Public Service, the Jacqueline Kennedy Onassis Award for Public Service and the Governor's Award for Volunteer Service.

In January 2011, Nancy Collins was elected to Mississippi State Senate, representing District Six after the position was vacated by Alan Nunelle, following his election to US Congress representing Mississippi's First District. She currently serves as chairman of the Senate Accountability, Efficiency and Transparency Committee and serves as vice chairman of the Education Committee. She is a member of the Agriculture, Appropriations, Forestry, Public Health and Welfare, and Veterans and Military Affairs committees. She also serves as a legislative advisor to the State Personnel Board and she has served as Chairman and vice chairman of the Joint Legislative Committee on Performance, Evaluation and Expenditure Review, commonly known as the PEER Committee. On August 4, 2015 Sen. Nancy Collins, R-Tupelo, was upset by Guntown Alderman Chad McMahan.

== Career ==
Prior to her election to Mississippi State Senate, Nancy Collins served as chairman of North Mississippi Interact and is a past board member of SAV-A-Life, the Boys and Girls Club, the Tupelo Christian Women's Club, Habitat for Humanity, and the Family Resource Center. She is a registered nurse, a limited obstetrical ultrasonographer, a speech therapist, and has worked as a social worker. She also established the Parkgate Pregnancy Clinic's Medical Clinic. In 2015, Nancy Collins ran an unsuccessful campaign for the U.S. House of Representatives in Mississippi's First Congressional District in a special election following the death of Congressman Alan Nunnelee who died in February 2015. If elected, she would have been the first woman from Mississippi to serve in the United States Congress.
