= Travis Childers =

American politician (born 1958)

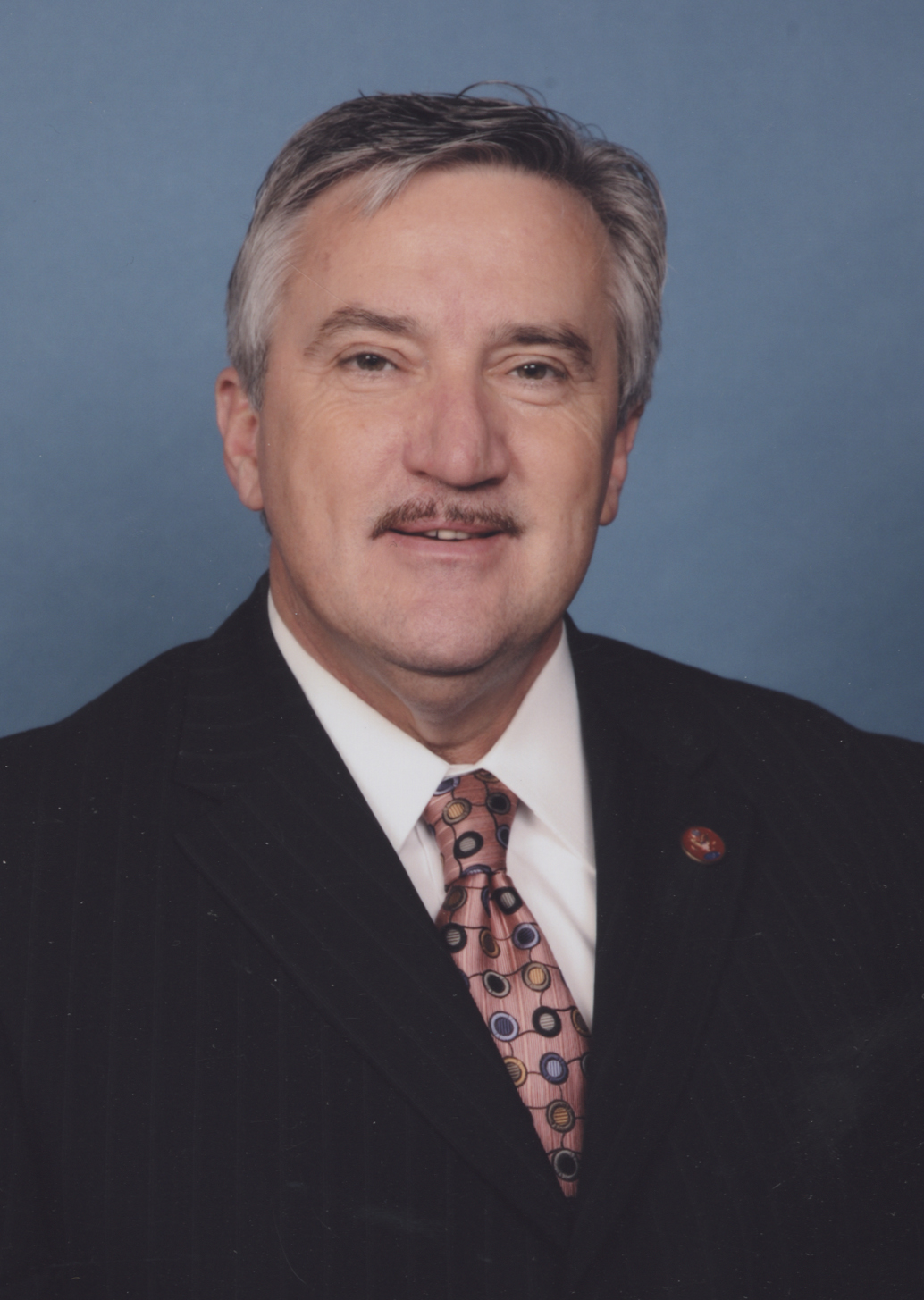
- Official portrait, 2008

Member of the U.S. House of Representatives from Mississippi's 1st district
- In office May 13, 2008 – January 3, 2011 (Note: Childers's official service begins on the date of the special election, while he was not sworn in until May 20, 2008.)
- Preceded by: Roger Wicker
- Succeeded by: Alan Nunnelee

Personal details
- Born: Travis Wayne Childers; March 29, 1958 (age 68) Booneville, Mississippi, U.S.
- Party: Democratic
- Spouse: Tami Childers
- Children: 2
- Education: Northeast Mississippi Community College (attended); University of Mississippi, Oxford (BA)

Travis Wayne Childers (born March 29, 1958) is an American politician who served as the U.S. representative for Mississippi's 1st congressional district from 2008 to 2011. The district included much of the northern portion of the state including New Albany, Columbus, Oxford, Southaven, and Tupelo. A member of the Democratic Party, Childers previously served as Chancery Clerk of Prentiss County from 1992 until his election to Congress. On March 1, 2014, Childers announced that he was running for the United States Senate. He won his party's nomination for the Senate seat in the Democratic primary on June 3. He lost the general election to Republican incumbent Thad Cochran.

== Early life, education and career ==
Childers was born in Booneville in Prentiss County, Mississippi, on March 29, 1958. He is the son of John Wayne and Betty (Stokes) Childers. His father, a native of Glen, died when Travis was 16 years old. In high school, Travis worked nights and weekends at a convenience store in Booneville to help his mother, Betty, and sister, Tammy.

Childers attended Northeast Mississippi Junior College and then the University of Mississippi, where he received his bachelor's degree in business administration in 1980.

While still a student at Ole Miss, Childers became licensed as a Real Estate Salesperson by the Mississippi Real Estate Commission (MREC) and became a realtor. After graduating from college, he joined Robert Davis' real estate business in Booneville and worked there throughout the 1980s.

Eventually he became licensed as a Real Estate Broker by MREC prior to his ownership of Travis Childers Realty & Associates, now Childers Realty and Associates, a Northeast Mississippi real estate firm.

Childers owns a personal care home, the Landmark Community, and the Landmark Nursing Center, an 80-bed skilled care facility and Alzheimer's unit.

In 1991, Childers was elected Prentiss County Chancery Clerk. He was elected five times (with 75 percent of the vote the final time). Childers was chosen to serve as President of the Mississippi Chancery Clerks Association for the 2001–2002 term.

In September, 2016, Travis Childers was awarded the Prentiss County Development Association's "Doug Mansell Award", an annual award given to a person in Prentiss County who has contributed to the progress, betterment and development of Prentiss County and northeast Mississippi.

In October, 2016, Childers was inducted into the Northeast Mississippi Community College Hall of Fame.

== U.S. House of Representatives ==
=== Committee assignments ===
- Committee on Agriculture
  - Subcommittee on Department Operations, Oversight, Nutrition and Forestry
  - Subcommittee on General Farm Commodities and Risk Management
- Committee on Financial Services
  - Subcommittee on Capital Markets, Insurance, and Government-Sponsored Enterprises
  - Subcommittee on Financial Institutions and Consumer Credit

=== Notable votes ===
In the 111th Congress, Childers voted for the American Recovery and Reinvestment Act and reauthorization of SCHIP. Childers opposed the 2009 American Clean Energy and Security Act. While Childers did vote against the Patient Protection and Affordable Care Act, he is against full repeal of the law. Childers stated that while he supports health care reform, he believes the bill needed changes. However, in his 2014 bid for Senate, he stated that the Patient Protection and Affordable Care Act is the law, and he supports it.

== Political campaigns ==
=== 2008 ===
A special election in Mississippi's 1st congressional district was triggered when 12-year Republican incumbent Roger Wicker was appointed by Mississippi Governor Haley Barbour to the United States Senate seat vacated by Trent Lott.

Childers was endorsed by many prominent newspapers in the region: the Northeast Mississippi Daily Journal, the Commercial Dispatch, and the Commercial Appeal.

Several candidates qualified for the election. In the initial April 22 special election, Childers won 49.4 percent of the vote, falling just 400 votes short of the majority (50 percent plus one) needed to avoid a runoff. On May 13, Childers faced Republican candidate Greg Davis (who had won 46.3 percent on April 22). Childers won the runoff.

This election returned the district to the Democrats. The seat was held by Democrat Jamie Whitten of Charleston for 54 years, the longest tenure of any congressman until Michigan representative John Dingell passed the mark on February 11, 2009. Whitten retired in 1995 and was succeeded by Wicker. Childers' victory came as a major shock to the Republicans. The district has a decided conservative bent; Wicker had won his first race for the seat with 63 percent of the vote and had faced no serious opposition since then. The district has supported the official Democratic candidate for president only once since 1956; George W. Bush carried the district with 62 percent of the vote in 2004.

=== 2008 general ===
Childers faced Greg Davis again in the general election on November 4, 2008. Childers defeated Davis 54% to 44%.

=== 2010 ===
Childers ran for re-election on November 2, 2010. He was challenged by Republican State Senator Alan Nunnelee (who held the state senate seat Wicker held before being elected to Congress), Constitutionalist Gail Giaramita, Libertarian Harold Taylor, Reformist Barbara Dale Washer, and Independent Wally Pang. Nunnelee defeated Childers, 55% to 41%.

=== 2014 Senate election ===
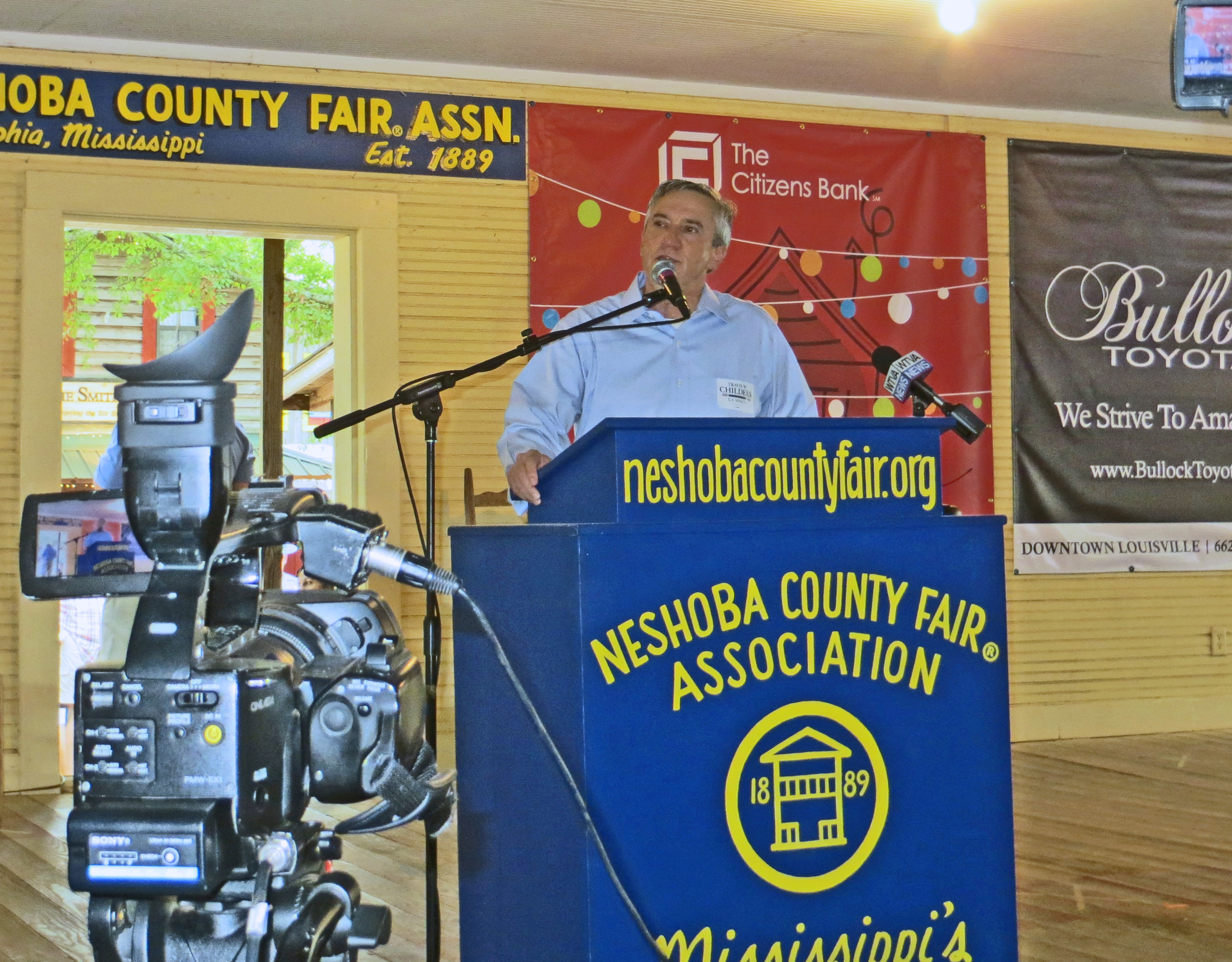
Childers campaigning for U.S. Senate

Childers ran for the United States Senate in 2014. His Republican opponent was incumbent Thad Cochran. Childers was endorsed by the Alliance for Retired Americans during his Senate campaign. Childers lost the election to Cochran on November 4, 2014.

== Positions on issues ==
Childers identifies himself as a moderate Democrat. Childers supports increased funding for public education. He favored a swift withdrawal of American troops from Iraq. He is against privatization of Social Security and raising the age of retirement. Childers describes himself as pro-life and pro-gun, and he was endorsed by the National Right to Life Committee and the NRA Political Victory Fund in his 2010 reelection campaign. Childers said he supports job creation, increasing the minimum wage and is a strong advocate for public education. Childers supports tax breaks for small businesses that put people back to work, and ending tax breaks for companies that ship jobs to India and China. He supports equal pay for women, and increasing the minimum wage to a livable wage. Citing the national debt, Childers pledged to support a Balanced Budget Amendment. Childers has been described as a Blue Dog Democrat.

== Personal life ==
Childers and his wife, Tami, have two children: Dustin, a recent graduate from Mississippi College School of Law practices law in the family's hometown. Lauren, a graduate of the University of Mississippi is an employee of the University of Mississippi (Ole Miss). Lauren Childers was Miss Ole Miss in the year 2010. His wife Tami manages the family's healthcare businesses. Travis Childers is a member of Booneville First United Methodist Church.

U.S. House of Representatives
Preceded by Roger Wicker	Member of the U.S. House of Representatives from Mississippi's 1st congressional district 2008–2011	Succeeded by Alan Nunnelee
Party political offices
Preceded by Erik Fleming	Democratic nominee for U.S. Senator from Mississippi (Class 2); 2014	Succeeded by Mike Espy
U.S. order of precedence (ceremonial)
Preceded by Mike Sodrel as Former U.S. Representative	Order of precedence of the United States as Former U.S. Representative	Succeeded by John W. Cox Jr. as Former U.S. Representative
