= 2014 United States House of Representatives elections in Mississippi =

- November 4, 2014

All 4 Mississippi seats to the United States House of Representatives
	Majority party	Minority party
Party	Republican	Democratic
Last election	3	1
Seats won	3	1
Seat change	Steady	Steady
Popular vote	329,169	230,014
Percentage	52.56%	36.73%
Swing	▼2.68%	▲2.68%

Republican
40–50%
50–60%
60–70%
70–80%
80–90%
Democratic
40–50%
50–60%
60–70%
70–80%
80–90%
Independent
40–50%

The 2014 United States House of Representatives elections in Mississippi were held on Tuesday, November 4, 2014 to elect the four members of the United States House of Representatives from the state of Mississippi, one from each of the state's four congressional districts. The elections coincided with other elections to the United States Senate and House of Representatives and various state and local elections, including a Senate election in Mississippi.

== Overview ==
2014 United States House of Representatives elections in Mississippi
Party	Votes	Percentage	Seats	+/–
Republican	329,169	52.56%	3	-
Democratic	230,014	36.73%	1	-
Reform	14,897	2.38%	0	-
Libertarian	7,303	1.17%	0	-
Independents	44,896	7.17%	0	-
Totals	626,279	100.00%	4	—

=== District ===
Results of the 2014 United States House of Representatives elections in Mississippi by district:

District	Republican		Democratic		Others		Total		Result
District	Votes	%	Votes	%	Votes	%	Votes	%	Result
District 1	102,622	67.91%	43,713	28.93%	4,776	3.16%	151,111	100%	Republican hold
District 2	0	0.00%	100,688	67.74%	47,958	32.26%	148,646	100%	Democratic hold
District 3	117,771	68.89%	47,744	27.93%	5,431	3.18%	170,946	100%	Republican hold
District 4	108,776	69.92%	37,869	24.34%	8,931	5.74%	155,576	100%	Republican hold
Total	329,169	52.56%	230,014	36.73%	67,096	10.71%	626,279	100%	

== District 1 ==
2014 Mississippi's 1st congressional district election

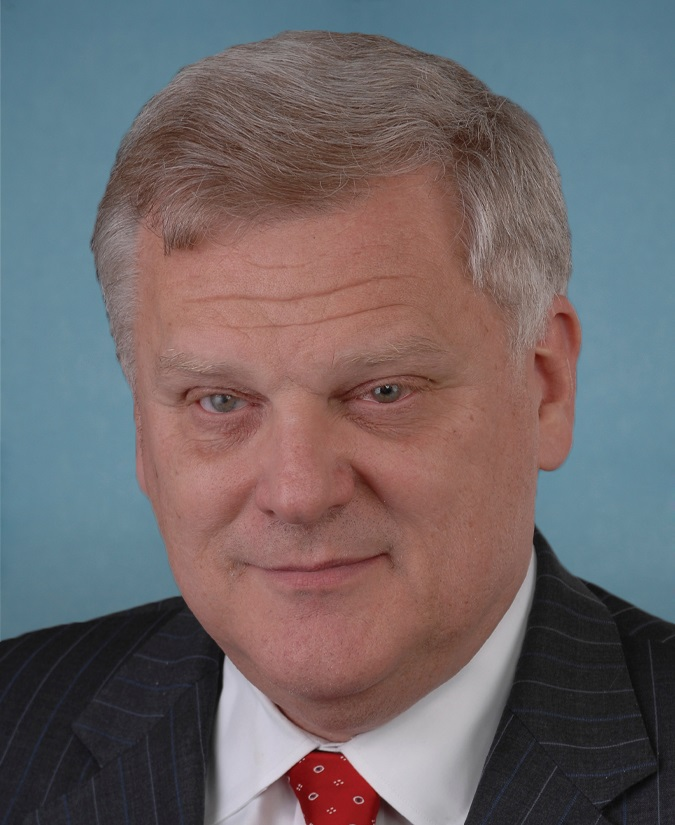

Nominee	Alan Nunnelee	Ron Dickey
Party	Republican	Democratic
Popular vote	102,622	43,713
Percentage	67.9%	28.9%
- County results Nunnelee: 40–50% 50–60% 60–70% 70–80% 80–90% Dickey: 40–50%
U.S. Representative before election
Alan Nunnelee
Republican
Elected U.S. Representative
Alan Nunnelee
Republican

Incumbent Republican Alan Nunnelee, who had represented the district since 2011, ran for re-election. He was re-elected with 60% of the vote in 2012 and the district had a PVI of R+16.

=== Republican primary ===
Nunnelee was the only Congressman in Mississippi who did not face a primary opponent in 2014.

==== Candidates ====
===== Nominee =====
- Alan Nunnelee, incumbent U.S. Representative

==== Results ====
Republican primary results
Party	Candidate	Votes	%
Republican	Alan Nunnelee (incumbent)	56,550	100.0

=== Democratic primary ===
==== Candidates ====
===== Nominee =====
- Ron Dickey

===== Eliminated in primary =====
- Rex Weathers, candidate for this seat in 1992 and 1996 and the nominee for this seat in 1998 and 2002

==== Results ====
Democratic primary results
Party	Candidate	Votes	%
Democratic	Ron Dickey	9,741	66.0
Democratic	Rex Weathers	5,022	34.0
Total votes		14,763	100.0

=== Libertarian primary ===
==== Candidates ====
===== Nominee =====
- Danny Bedwell, chair of the Mississippi Libertarian Party

=== General results ===
==== Predictions ====
Source	Ranking	As of
The Cook Political Report	Safe R	November 3, 2014
Rothenberg	Safe R	October 24, 2014
Sabato's Crystal Ball	Safe R	October 30, 2014
RCP	Safe R	November 2, 2014
Daily Kos Elections	Safe R	November 4, 2014

==== Results ====
2014 Mississippi's 1st congressional district election
Party	Candidate	Votes	%
Republican	Alan Nunnelee (incumbent)	102,622	67.9
Democratic	Ron Dickey	43,713	28.9
Libertarian	Danny Bedwell	3,830	2.5
Reform	Lajena Walley	946	0.6
Total votes		151,111	100.0
Republican hold			

==== By county ====
County	Alan Nunnelee Republican		Ron Dickey Democratic		Various candidates Other parties		Margin		Total
County	#	%	#	%	#	%	#	%	Total
Alcorn	4,625	77.78%	1,139	19.16%	182	3.06%	3,486	58.63%	5,946
Benton	1,088	58.43%	725	38.94%	49	2.63%	363	19.50%	1,862
Calhoun	2,320	70.01%	911	27.49%	83	2.50%	1,409	42.52%	3,314
Chickasaw	2,212	53.24%	1,845	44.40%	98	2.36%	367	8.83%	4,155
Choctaw	1,581	71.99%	546	24.86%	69	3.14%	1,035	47.13%	2,196
Clay	2,950	48.25%	2,997	49.02%	167	2.73%	-47	-0.77%	6,114
DeSoto	18,940	72.65%	6,178	23.70%	951	3.65%	12,762	48.95%	26,069
Itawamba	3,617	77.42%	806	17.25%	249	5.33%	2,811	60.17%	4,672
Lafayette	6,236	64.97%	3,025	31.52%	337	3.51%	3,211	33.45%	9,598
Lee	13,185	70.86%	4,850	26.07%	571	3.07%	8,335	44.80%	18,606
Lowndes	8,514	59.95%	5,279	37.17%	409	2.88%	3,235	22.78%	14,202
Marshall	3,484	48.82%	3,466	48.56%	187	2.62%	18	0.25%	7,137
Monroe	4,885	65.19%	2,387	31.86%	221	2.95%	2,498	33.34%	7,493
Oktibbeha (part)	515	62.58%	291	35.36%	17	2.07%	224	27.22%	823
Pontotoc	4,988	77.90%	1,147	17.91%	268	4.19%	3,841	59.99%	6,403
Prentiss	3,398	67.43%	1,506	29.89%	135	2.68%	1,892	37.55%	5,039
Tate	3,388	67.99%	1,425	28.60%	170	3.41%	1,963	39.39%	4,983
Tippah	3,700	77.47%	931	19.49%	145	3.04%	2,769	57.98%	4,776
Tishomingo	3,455	76.98%	842	18.76%	191	4.26%	2,613	58.22%	4,488
Union	4,429	79.62%	998	17.94%	136	2.44%	3,431	61.68%	5,563
Webster	2,222	80.33%	485	17.53%	59	2.13%	1,737	62.80%	2,766
Winston	2,890	58.91%	1,934	39.42%	82	1.67%	956	19.49%	4,906
Totals	102,622	67.91%	43,713	28.93%	4,776	3.16%	58,909	38.98%	151,111

==== Aftermath ====
Nunnelee died on February 6, 2015, shortly after starting his third term in office.

== District 2 ==
2014 Mississippi's 2nd congressional district election

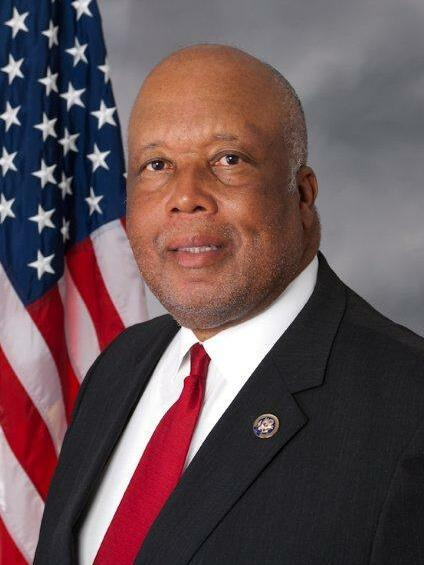

Nominee	Bennie Thompson	Troy Ray	Shelley Shoemake
Party	Democratic	Independent	Reform
Popular vote	100,688	36,465	11,493
Percentage	67.8%	24.5%	7.7%
- County results Thompson: 40–50% 50–60% 60–70% 70–80% 80–90% Ray: 40–50%
U.S. Representative before election
Bennie Thompson
Democratic
Elected U.S. Representative
Bennie Thompson
Democratic

Incumbent Democrat Bennie Thompson, who had represented the district since 1993, ran for re-election. He was re-elected with 67% of the vote in 2012 and the district had a PVI of D+13.

=== Democratic primary ===
==== Candidates ====
===== Nominee =====
- Bennie Thompson, incumbent U.S. Representative

===== Eliminated in primary =====
- Damien Fairconetue

==== Results ====
Democratic primary results
Party	Candidate	Votes	%
Democratic	Bennie Thompson (incumbent)	41,618	95.7
Democratic	Damien Fairconetue	1,860	4.3
Total votes		43,478	100.0

=== Republican primary ===
No Republicans filed to run for the seat

=== General results ===
==== Predictions ====
Source	Ranking	As of
The Cook Political Report	Safe D	November 3, 2014
Rothenberg	Safe D	October 24, 2014
Sabato's Crystal Ball	Safe D	October 30, 2014
RCP	Safe D	November 2, 2014
Daily Kos Elections	Safe D	November 4, 2014

==== Results ====
2014 Mississippi's 2nd congressional district election
Party	Candidate	Votes	%
Democratic	Bennie Thompson (incumbent)	100,688	67.7
Independent	Troy Ray	36,465	24.5
Reform	Shelley Shoemake	11,493	7.7
Total votes		148,646	100.0
Democratic hold			

==== By county ====
County	Bennie Thompson Democratic		Troy Ray Independent		Shelley Shoemake Reform		Margin		Total
County	#	%	#	%	#	%	#	%	Total
Attala	1,857	47.02%	1,686	42.69%	406	10.28%	171	4.33%	3,949
Bolivar	6,099	72.85%	1,597	19.08%	676	8.07%	4,502	53.77%	8,372
Carroll	1,203	40.59%	1,337	45.11%	424	14.30%	-134	-4.52%	2,964
Claiborne	1,863	85.42%	251	11.51%	67	3.07%	1,612	73.91%	2,181
Coahoma	3,596	75.36%	928	19.45%	248	5.20%	2,668	55.91%	4,772
Copiah	3,666	59.39%	1,795	29.08%	712	11.53%	1,871	30.31%	6,173
Grenada	2,815	54.38%	1,903	36.76%	459	8.87%	912	17.62%	5,177
Hinds (part)	31,039	74.28%	7,869	18.83%	2,878	6.89%	23,170	55.45%	41,786
Holmes	3,921	85.11%	582	12.63%	104	2.26%	3,339	72.48%	4,607
Humphreys	1,704	77.63%	358	16.31%	133	6.06%	1,346	61.32%	2,195
Issaquena	233	63.49%	102	27.79%	32	8.72%	131	35.69%	367
Jefferson	1,679	88.32%	173	9.10%	49	2.58%	1,506	79.22%	1,901
Leake	2,304	52.93%	1,447	33.24%	602	13.83%	857	19.69%	4,353
Leflore	4,134	72.13%	1,253	21.86%	344	6.00%	2,881	50.27%	5,731
Madison (part)	3,892	76.28%	839	16.44%	371	7.27%	3,053	59.84%	5,102
Montgomery	1,452	55.65%	950	36.41%	207	7.93%	502	19.24%	2,609
Panola	3,615	56.05%	2,295	35.58%	540	8.37%	1,320	20.47%	6,450
Quitman	1,884	74.55%	514	20.34%	129	5.10%	1,370	54.21%	2,527
Sharkey	791	75.05%	199	18.88%	64	6.07%	592	56.17%	1,054
Sunflower	3,776	75.35%	886	17.68%	349	6.96%	2,890	57.67%	5,011
Tallahatchie	2,007	70.74%	686	24.18%	144	5.08%	1,321	46.56%	2,837
Tunica	1,213	75.58%	270	16.82%	122	7.60%	943	58.75%	1,605
Warren	5,505	51.66%	3,911	36.70%	1,240	11.64%	1,594	14.96%	10,656
Washington	6,106	71.60%	1,808	21.20%	614	7.20%	4,298	50.40%	8,528
Yalobusha	1,659	52.65%	1,345	42.68%	147	4.67%	314	9.97%	3,151
Yazoo	2,675	58.30%	1,481	32.28%	432	9.42%	1,194	26.02%	4,588
Totals	100,688	67.74%	36,465	24.53%	11,493	7.73%	64,223	43.21%	148,646

== District 3 ==
2014 Mississippi's 3rd congressional district election

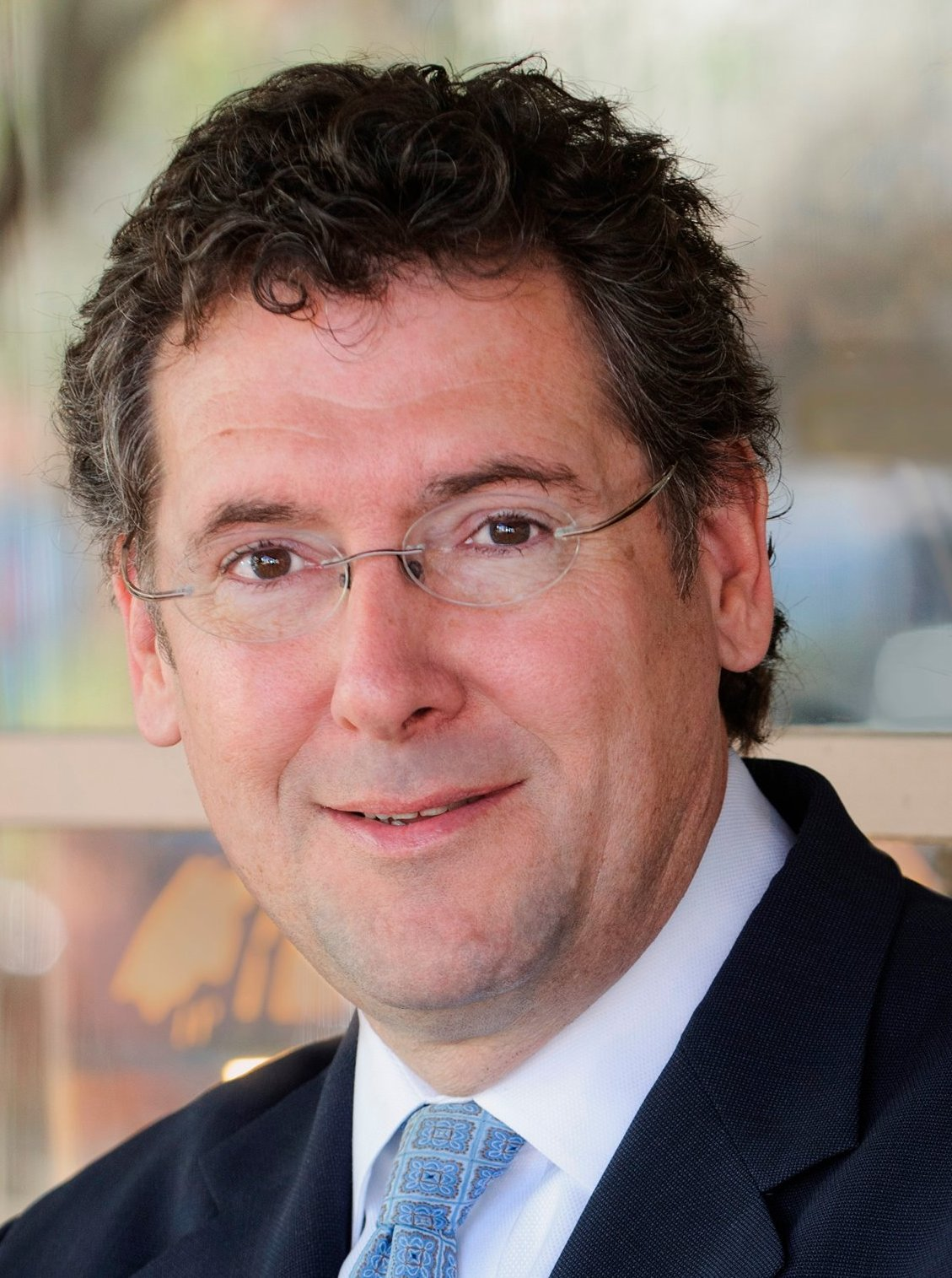

Nominee	Gregg Harper	Doug Magee
Party	Republican	Democratic
Popular vote	117,771	47,744
Percentage	68.9%	27.9%
- County results Harper: 40–50% 50–60% 60–70% 70–80% 80–90% Magee: 40–50% 50–60% 60–70%
U.S. Representative before election
Gregg Harper
Republican
Elected U.S. Representative
Gregg Harper
Republican

Incumbent Republican Gregg Harper, who had represented the district since 2009, ran for re-election. He was re-elected with 80% of the vote in 2012 and the district had a PVI of R+14.

=== Republican primary ===
==== Candidates ====
===== Nominee =====
- Gregg Harper, incumbent U.S. Representative

===== Eliminated in primary =====
- Hardy Caraway, Independent candidate for the 2nd district in 1984 and nominee for the 2nd district in 2000

==== Results ====
Republican primary results
Party	Candidate	Votes	%
Republican	Gregg Harper (incumbent)	85,674	92.2
Republican	Hardy Caraway	7,258	7.8
Total votes		92,932	100.0

=== Democratic primary ===
==== Candidates ====
===== Nominee =====
- Doug Magee, Republican candidate for the 4th district in 1988

===== Eliminated in primary =====
- Jim Liljeberg, high school maths teacher
- Dennis Quinn

==== Results ====
Democratic primary results
Party	Candidate	Votes	%
Democratic	Doug Magee	7,738	48.2
Democratic	Dennis Quinn	5,820	36.3
Democratic	Jim Liljeberg	2,490	15.5
Total votes		16,048	100.0

==== Runoff results ====
Democratic primary results
Party	Candidate	Votes	%
Democratic	Doug Magee	4,925	52.5
Democratic	Dennis Quinn	4,462	47.5
Total votes		9,387	100.0

=== General results ===
==== Predictions ====
Source	Ranking	As of
The Cook Political Report	Safe R	November 3, 2014
Rothenberg	Safe R	October 24, 2014
Sabato's Crystal Ball	Safe R	October 30, 2014
RCP	Safe R	November 2, 2014
Daily Kos Elections	Safe R	November 4, 2014

==== Results ====
2014 Mississippi's 3rd congressional district election
Party	Candidate	Votes	%
Republican	Gregg Harper (incumbent)	117,771	68.9
Democratic	Doug Magee	47,744	27.9
Independent	Roger Gerrard	3,890	2.3
Reform	Barbara Dale Washer	1,541	0.9
Total votes		170,946	100.0
Republican hold			

==== By county ====
County	Gregg Harper Republican		Doug Magee Democratic		Various candidates Other parties		Margin		Total
County	#	%	#	%	#	%	#	%	Total
Adams	4,338	51.88%	3,828	45.78%	195	2.33%	510	6.10%	8,361
Amite	2,455	62.82%	1,345	34.42%	108	2.76%	1,110	28.40%	3,908
Clarke (part)	2,654	74.74%	779	21.94%	118	3.32%	1,875	52.80%	3,551
Covington	3,282	63.78%	1,630	31.68%	234	4.55%	1,652	32.10%	5,146
Franklin	1,496	66.79%	678	30.27%	66	2.95%	818	36.52%	2,240
Hinds (part)	5,962	70.26%	2,342	27.60%	182	2.14%	3,620	42.66%	8,486
Jasper	2,305	49.41%	2,198	47.12%	162	3.47%	107	2.29%	4,665
Jefferson Davis	1,708	44.18%	2,035	52.64%	123	3.18%	-327	-8.46%	3,866
Kemper	1,055	46.85%	1,106	49.11%	91	4.04%	-51	-2.26%	2,252
Lauderdale	10,640	72.82%	3,592	24.58%	379	2.59%	7,048	48.24%	14,611
Lawrence	2,260	67.32%	1,026	30.56%	71	2.11%	1,234	36.76%	3,357
Lincoln	5,550	75.67%	1,622	22.12%	162	2.21%	3,928	53.56%	7,334
Madison (part)	15,156	79.21%	3,421	17.88%	556	2.91%	11,735	61.33%	19,133
Neshoba	4,751	78.10%	1,161	19.09%	171	2.81%	3,590	59.02%	6,083
Newton	3,819	76.08%	1,124	22.39%	77	1.53%	2,695	53.69%	5,020
Noxubee	827	31.02%	1,788	67.07%	51	1.91%	-961	-36.05%	2,666
Oktibbeha (part)	4,840	59.95%	3,051	37.79%	182	2.25%	1,789	22.16%	8,073
Pike	4,403	57.00%	3,124	40.45%	197	2.55%	1,279	16.56%	7,724
Rankin	25,973	80.10%	4,867	15.01%	1,584	4.89%	21,106	65.09%	32,424
Scott	3,292	67.14%	1,453	29.63%	158	3.22%	1,839	37.51%	4,903
Simpson	4,591	66.73%	2,079	30.22%	210	3.05%	2,512	36.51%	6,880
Smith	3,284	75.84%	875	20.21%	171	3.95%	2,409	55.64%	4,330
Walthall	2,323	60.73%	1,380	36.08%	122	3.19%	943	24.65%	3,825
Wilkinson	807	38.28%	1,240	58.82%	61	2.89%	-433	-20.54%	2,108
Totals	117,771	68.89%	47,744	27.93%	5,431	3.18%	70,027	40.96%	170,946

== District 4 ==
2014 Mississippi's 4th congressional district election

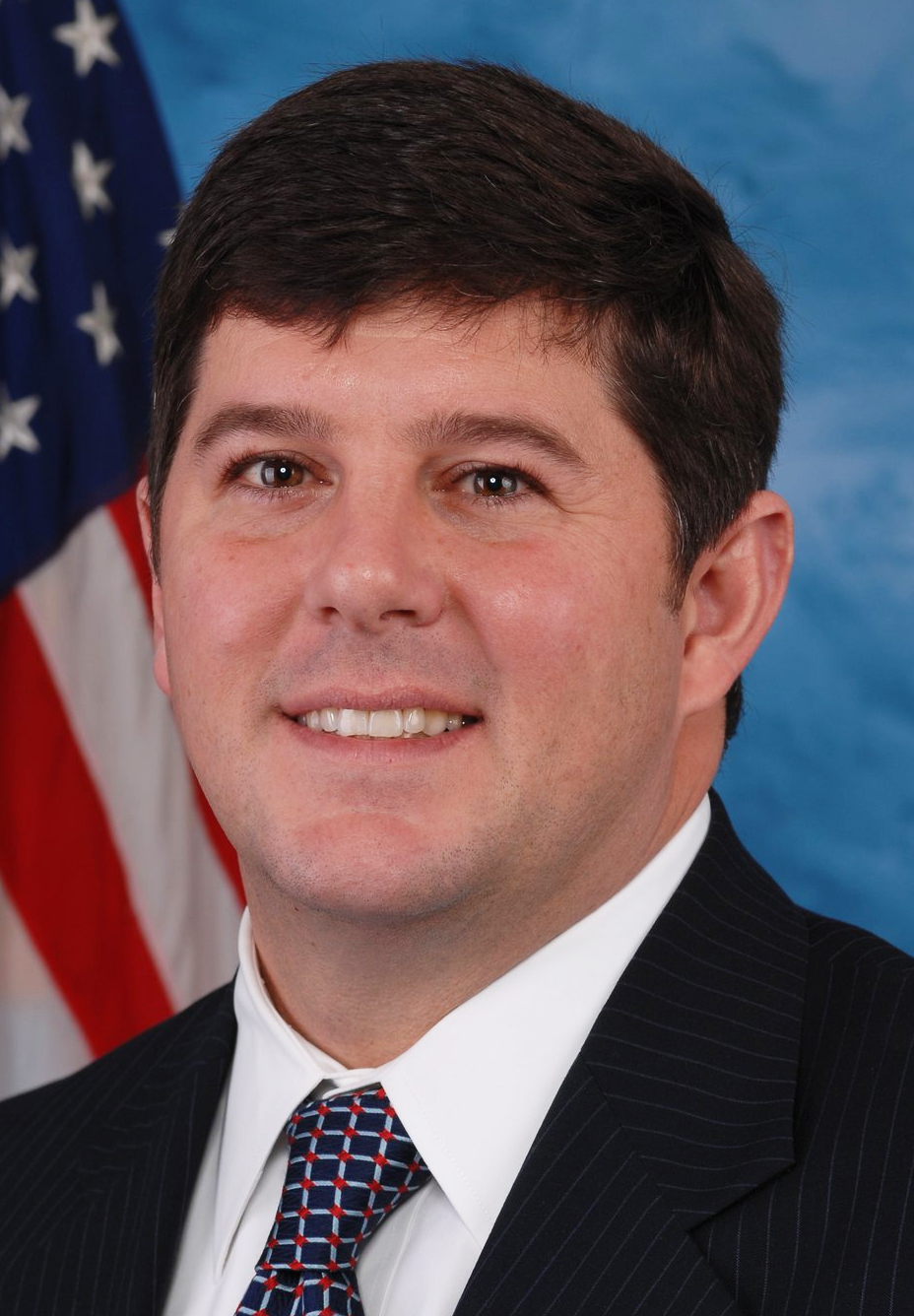

Nominee	Steven Palazzo	Matthew Moore
Party	Republican	Democratic
Popular vote	108,776	37,869
Percentage	69.9%	24.3%
- County results Palazzo: 60–70% 70–80% 80–90% Moore: 40–50%
U.S. Representative before election
Steven Palazzo
Republican
Elected U.S. Representative
Steven Palazzo
Republican

Incumbent Republican Steven Palazzo, who had represented the district since 2011, ran for re-election. He was re-elected with 64% of the vote in 2012 and the district had a PVI of R+21.

=== Republican primary ===
Palazzo was first elected in 2010, defeating Democratic incumbent Gene Taylor. He was targeted by the Club for Growth. Taylor, who served in the U.S. House from 1989 to 2011, had switched parties, and ran for the seat as a Republican.

==== Candidates ====
===== Nominee =====
- Steven Palazzo, incumbent U.S. Representative

===== Eliminated in primary =====
- Tom Carter, business executive
- Tavish Kelly
- Gene Taylor, former U.S. Representative
- Ron Vincent, Tea Party activist, retired engineer and candidate for this seat in 2012

===== Declined =====
- Chris McDaniel, state senator (running for the Senate)

==== Results ====
Republican primary results
Party	Candidate	Votes	%
Republican	Steven Palazzo (incumbent)	54,268	50.53
Republican	Gene Taylor	46,133	42.95
Republican	Tom Carter	4,955	4.61
Republican	Tavish Kelly	1,129	1.05
Republican	Ron Vincent	904	0.84
Total votes		107,389	100.0

=== Democratic primary ===
==== Candidates ====
===== Nominee =====
- Matthew Moore, honours student at Mississippi Gulf Coast Community College and nominee for this seat 2012

===== Eliminated in primary =====
- Trish Causey

==== Results ====
Democratic primary results
Party	Candidate	Votes	%
Democratic	Matt Moore	6,355	55.7
Democratic	Trish Causey	5,063	44.3
Total votes		16,048	100.0

=== General results ===
==== Predictions ====
Source	Ranking	As of
The Cook Political Report	Safe R	November 3, 2014
Rothenberg	Safe R	October 24, 2014
Sabato's Crystal Ball	Safe R	October 30, 2014
RCP	Safe R	November 2, 2014
Daily Kos Elections	Safe R	November 4, 2014

==== Results ====
2014 Mississippi's 4th congressional district election
Party	Candidate	Votes	%
Republican	Steven Palazzo (incumbent)	108,776	69.9
Democratic	Matt Moore	37,869	24.3
Independent	Cindy Burleson	3,684	2.4
Libertarian	Joey Robinson	3,473	2.2
Reform	Eli Jackson	917	0.6
Independent	Ed Reich	857	0.6
Total votes		155,576	100.0
Republican hold			

==== By county ====
County	Steven Palazzo Republican		Matt Moore Democratic		Various candidates Other parties		Margin		Total
County	#	%	#	%	#	%	#	%	Total
Clarke (part)	254	45.68%	277	49.82%	25	4.50%	-23	-4.14%	556
Forrest	9,088	62.96%	4,468	30.95%	878	6.08%	4,620	32.01%	14,434
George	3,759	83.39%	529	11.73%	220	4.88%	3,230	71.65%	4,508
Greene	1,944	79.31%	416	16.97%	91	3.71%	1,528	62.34%	2,451
Hancock	6,470	70.69%	1,994	21.79%	688	7.52%	4,476	48.91%	9,152
Harrison	21,472	63.39%	10,118	29.87%	2,284	6.74%	11,354	33.52%	33,874
Jackson	21,374	69.76%	7,557	24.66%	1,709	5.58%	13,817	45.09%	30,640
Jones	12,681	71.62%	4,026	22.74%	998	5.64%	8,655	48.88%	17,705
Lamar	11,015	79.38%	2,138	15.41%	724	5.22%	8,877	63.97%	13,877
Marion	4,344	69.77%	1,740	27.95%	142	2.28%	2,604	41.82%	6,226
Pearl River	8,583	78.01%	1,769	16.08%	650	5.91%	6,814	61.93%	11,002
Perry	2,041	74.22%	582	21.16%	127	4.62%	1,459	53.05%	2,750
Stone	2,902	72.08%	857	21.29%	267	6.63%	2,045	50.79%	4,026
Wayne	2,849	65.12%	1,398	31.95%	128	2.93%	1,451	33.17%	4,375
Totals	108,776	69.92%	37,869	24.34%	8,931	5.74%	70,907	45.58%	155,576
