= 2010 United States House of Representatives elections in Mississippi =

- November 2, 2010

All 4 Mississippi seats to the United States House of Representatives
	Majority party	Minority party
Party	Republican	Democratic
Last election	1	3
Seats won	3	1
Seat change	▲2	▼2
Popular vote	423,579	350,695
Percentage	53.71%	44.47%
Swing	▲12.02%	▼13.39%

Republican
40–50%
50–60%
60–70%
70–80%
80–90%
Democratic
40–50%
50–60%
60–70%
70–80%
80–90%

Elections were held on November 2, 2010, to determine Mississippi's four members of the United States House of Representatives. Representatives were elected for two-year terms to serve in the 112th United States Congress from January 3, 2011, until January 3, 2013. Primary elections were held on June 1, 2010, and primary runoff elections on June 22.

Of the four elections, the 1st district was rated as competitive by Sabato's Crystal Ball, and the 1st and 4th districts were rated as competitive by The Cook Political Report, CQ Politics and The Rothenberg Political Report.

The Republican Party flipped the 1st and 4th districts, defeating incumbent Democrats Travis Childers and Gene Taylor, respectively. Two incumbents were re-elected; Democrat Bennie Thompson of the 2nd district and Republican Gregg Harper of the 3rd district. In total, three Republicans and one Democrat were elected, marking the first time since 1996 that the Republican Party won a majority of Mississippi's congressional districts, and only the second time since Reconstruction. A total of 788,549 votes were cast, of which 423,579 (54 percent) were for Republican candidates, 350,695 (44 percent) were for Democratic candidates, 6,560 (1 percent) were for an independent candidate, 4,292 (1 percent) were for Reform Party candidates, 2,188 (0.3 percent) were for Libertarian Party candidates and 1,235 (0.2 percent) were for a Constitution Party candidate.

== Overview ==
Results of the 2010 United States House of Representatives elections in Mississippi by district:

District	Republican		Democratic		Others		Total		Result
District	Votes	%	Votes	%	Votes	%	Votes	%	Result
District 1	121,074	55.26%	89,388	40.80%	8,631	3.94%	219,093	100%	Republican gain
District 2	64,499	37.64%	105,327	61.47%	1,530	0.89%	171,356	100%	Democratic hold
District 3	132,393	67.99%	60,737	31.19%	1,586	0.82%	194,716	100%	Republican hold
District 4	105,613	51.93%	95,243	46.83%	2,528	1.24%	203,384	100%	Republican gain
Total	423,579	53.72%	350,695	44.47%	14,275	1.81%	788,549	100%	

== District 1 ==
2010 Mississippi's 1st congressional district election

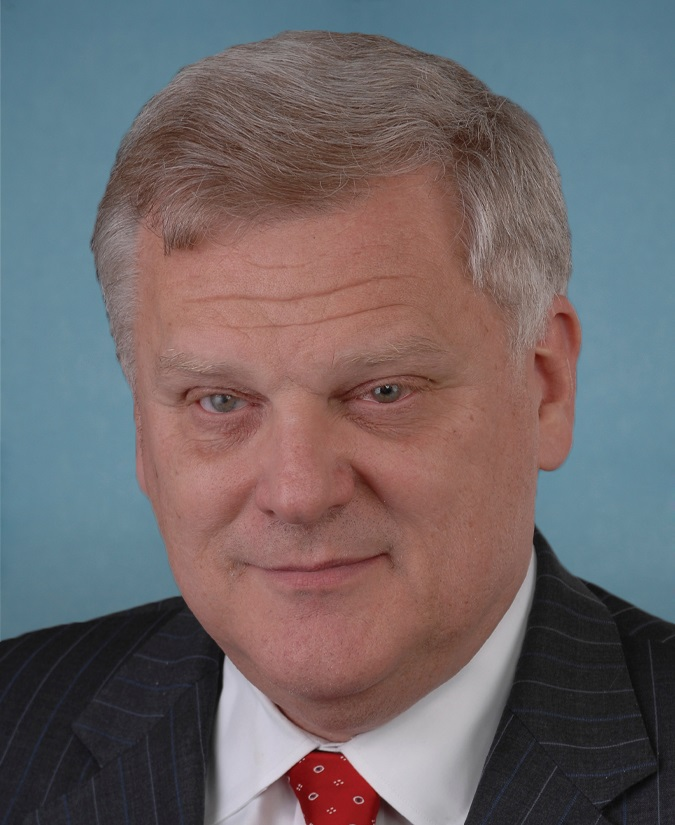

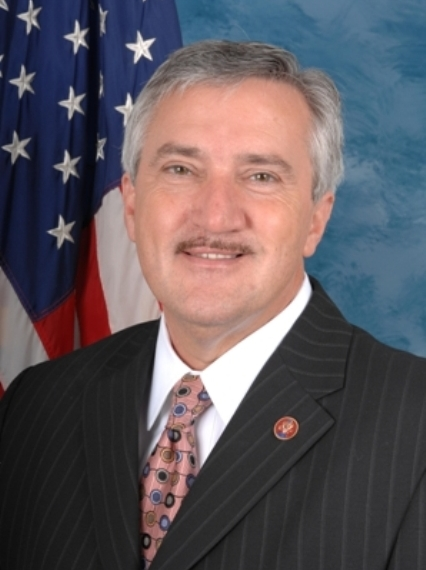
Nominee	Alan Nunnelee	Travis Childers
Party	Republican	Democratic
Popular vote	121,074	89,388
Percentage	55.3%	40.8%
- County results Nunnelee: 40–50% 50–60% 60–70% 70–80% Morris: 40–50% 50–60% 60–70%
U.S. Representative before election
Travis Childers
Democratic
Elected U.S. Representative
Alan Nunnelee
Republican

In 2010 the 1st district included Horn Lake, Olive Branch, Southaven and Tupelo. The district's population was 69 percent white and 27 percent black (see Race and ethnicity in the United States census); 77 percent were high school graduates and 17 percent had received a bachelor's degree or higher. Its median income was $38,944. In the 2008 presidential election the district gave 62 percent of its vote to Republican nominee John McCain and 37 percent to Democratic nominee Barack Obama.

Democrat Travis Childers, who was elected in a 2008 special election, was the incumbent. Childers was re-elected in the regularly-scheduled 2008 election with 55 percent of the vote. In May 2009 Childers denied planning to switch parties and seek re-election as a Republican, describing himself as a "Southern Democrat". In 2010 the Republican nominee was Alan Nunnelee, a member of the Mississippi State Senate. A. G. Baddley, an electrician; Les Green, a teacher; Rick "Rico" Hoskins; and Wally Pang, a retired restaurateur, ran as independent candidates. Gail Giaramita, a nurse, ran as the Constitution Party nominee. Harold Taylor, a former chair of the Libertarian Party of Mississippi, ran as the Libertarian Party nominee. Barbara Dale Washer, a teacher, ran as the Reform Party nominee.

Angela McGlowan, a Fox News political analyst; and Henry Ross, a former mayor of Eupora, also ran for the Republican nomination. Greg Davis, the mayor of Southaven who ran unsuccessfully in both 2008 elections, said in March 2009 that he would not run again in 2010. Merle Flowers, a member of the Mississippi Senate, met with the National Republican Congressional Committee in June 2009, but ultimately decided not to run.

Childers raised $1,817,037 and spent $1,796,376. Nunnelee raised $1,739,384 and spent $1,617,120. Green raised $40,296 and spent the same amount. Pang raised no money and spent $6,900. Giaramita raised $12,730 and spent $12,913.

In a poll of 303 likely voters, conducted in June 2010 by the Tarrance Group for Nunnelee's campaign, 50 percent of respondents supported Nunnelee while 42 percent favored Childers and 8 percent were undecided. In an Anzalone-Liszt poll of 400 likely voters, conducted in August and September 2010, Childers led with 46 percent to Nunnelee's 41 percent. Republican internal polls of 300 likely voters by Tarrance, conducted in September and October 2010, found Nunnelee leading Childers by 48 percent to 41 percent and by 51 percent to 40 percent respectively. A poll of 603 likely voters, conducted by Penn Schoen Berland in October 2010, found Nunnelee leading Childers by 44 percent to 39 percent with 12 percent undecided.

FiveThirtyEight's forecast gave Nunnelee an 82 percent chance of winning, and projected that he would receive 52 percent of the vote to Childers's 45 percent. On election day Nunnelee was elected with 55 percent of the vote to Childers's 41 percent. Nunnelee was re-elected in 2012 and 2014. Childers unsuccessfully ran for the U.S. Senate in 2014.

=== Republican primary results ===
Mississippi's 1st congressional district Republican primary, June 1, 2010
Party	Candidate	Votes	%
Republican	Alan Nunnelee	20,236	51.82
Republican	Henry Ross	12,894	33.02
Republican	Angela McGlowan	5,924	15.17
Total votes		39,144	100.00

==== Predictions ====
Source	Ranking	As of
The Cook Political Report	Tossup	November 1, 2010
Rothenberg	Tilt R (flip)	November 1, 2010
Sabato's Crystal Ball	Lean R (flip)	November 1, 2010
RCP	Lean R (flip)	November 1, 2010
CQ Politics	Tossup	October 28, 2010
New York Times	Lean R (flip)	November 1, 2010
FiveThirtyEight	Likely R (flip)	November 1, 2010

=== General election results ===
2010 Mississippi's 1st congressional district election
Party	Candidate	Votes	%
Republican	Alan Nunnelee	121,074	55.26
Democratic	Travis Childers (incumbent)	89,388	40.80
Independent	Wally Pang	2,180	1.00
Independent	Les Green	2,020	0.92
Independent	A. G. Baddley	1,882	0.86
Constitution	Gail Giaramita	1,235	0.56
Independent	Rick "Rico" Hoskins	478	0.22
Libertarian	Harold M. Taylor	447	0.20
Reform	Barbara Dale Washer	389	0.18
Total votes		219,093	100.00

==== By county ====
County	Travis Childers Democratic		Alan Nunnelee Republican		Various candidates Other parties		Margin		Total
County	#	%	#	%	#	%	#	%	Total
Alcorn	2,843	33.15%	5,507	64.21%	226	2.64%	2,664	31.06%	8,576
Benton	1,484	58.38%	1,004	39.50%	54	2.12%	-480	-18.88%	2,542
Calhoun	1,858	40.68%	2,522	55.22%	187	4.09%	664	14.54%	4,567
Chickasaw	3,181	54.73%	2,466	42.43%	165	2.84%	-715	-12.30%	5,812
Choctaw	1,082	34.54%	1,926	61.47%	125	3.99%	844	26.94%	3,133
Clay	4,656	59.28%	3,079	39.20%	119	1.52%	-1,577	-20.08%	7,854
DeSoto	10,450	28.82%	23,489	64.77%	2,326	6.41%	13,039	35.95%	36,265
Grenada	2,997	42.56%	3,927	55.77%	117	1.66%	930	13.21%	7,041
Itawamba	2,061	32.70%	3,985	63.23%	256	4.06%	1,924	30.53%	6,302
Lafayette	4,559	39.77%	6,611	57.67%	293	2.56%	2,052	17.90%	11,463
Lee	8,740	37.46%	14,157	60.68%	435	1.86%	5,417	23.22%	23,332
Lowndes	8,890	47.04%	9,660	51.11%	350	1.85%	770	4.07%	18,900
Marshall	5,981	60.63%	3,661	37.11%	222	2.25%	-2,320	-23.52%	9,864
Monroe	5,040	46.04%	5,709	52.15%	198	1.81%	669	6.11%	10,947
Panola	6,083	48.66%	4,461	35.69%	1,957	15.65%	-1,622	-12.97%	12,501
Pontotoc	2,475	30.57%	5,391	66.59%	230	2.84%	2,916	36.02%	8,096
Prentiss	4,669	58.36%	3,166	39.57%	166	2.07%	-1,503	-18.79%	8,001
Tate	2,910	39.16%	4,154	55.89%	368	4.95%	1,244	16.74%	7,432
Tippah	2,358	38.12%	3,671	59.35%	156	2.52%	1,313	21.23%	6,185
Tishomingo	1,897	35.43%	3,292	61.49%	165	3.08%	1,395	26.06%	5,354
Union	2,381	32.45%	4,791	65.29%	166	2.26%	2,410	32.84%	7,338
Webster (part)	828	24.88%	2,381	71.54%	119	3.58%	1,553	46.66%	3,328
Winston (part)	13	27.08%	35	72.92%	0	0.00%	22	45.83%	48
Yalobusha	1,952	46.34%	2,029	48.17%	231	5.48%	77	1.83%	4,212
Totals	89,388	40.80%	121,074	55.26%	8,631	3.94%	31,686	14.46%	219,093

=== External links ===
- "Travis Childers campaign website". Archived from the original on October 28, 2010.
- "Gail Giaramita campaign website". Archived from the original on September 3, 2010.
- "Les Green campaign website". Archived from the original on October 28, 2010.
- "Angela McGlowan campaign website". Archived from the original on February 9, 2010.
- "Alan Nunnelee campaign website". Archived from the original on October 29, 2010.
- "Henry Ross campaign website". Archived from the original on July 4, 2010.

== District 2 ==
2010 Mississippi's 2nd congressional district election

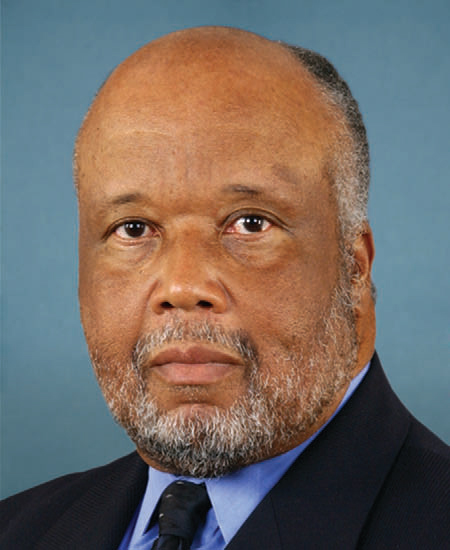

Nominee	Bennie Thompson	Bill Marcy
Party	Democratic	Republican
Popular vote	105,327	64,499
Percentage	61.47%	37.64%
- Thompson: 50–60% 60–70% 70–80% 80–90% Marcy: 50–60% 60–70%
U.S. Representative before election
Bennie Thompson
Democratic
Elected U.S. Representative
Bennie Thompson
Democratic

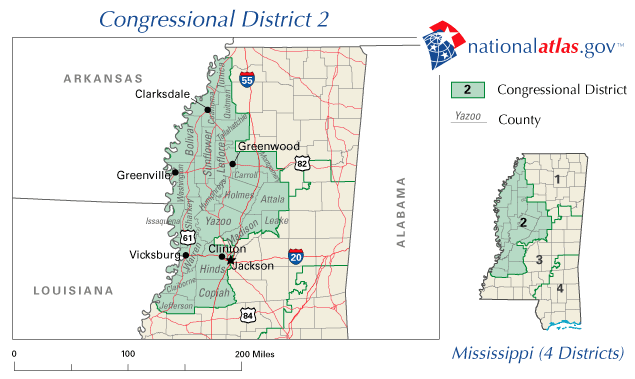
Mississippi's 2nd congressional district in 2010

In 2010 the 2nd district included Clinton, Greenville and parts of Jackson. The district's population was 66 percent black and 32 percent white (see Race and ethnicity in the United States census); 75 percent were high school graduates and 18 percent had received a bachelor's degree or higher. Its median income was $30,578. In the 2008 presidential election the district gave 66 percent of its vote to Democratic nominee Barack Obama and 33 percent to Republican nominee John McCain.

Democrat Bennie Thompson, who took office in 1993, was the incumbent. Thompson was re-elected in 2008 with 69 percent of the vote. In 2010 the Republican nominee was Bill Marcy, a former police officer. George Bailey and Richard Cook, a teacher, also ran in the Republican primary. Ashley Norwood ran as the Reform Party nominee.

Thompson raised $1,808,681 and spent $1,343,456. Marcy raised $47,933 and spent $40,847. In a poll of 442 registered voters and likely voters, conducted by JMC Enterprises in September 2010, 35 percent of respondents intended to vote for Thompson while 34 percent intended to vote for Marcy and 31 percent were undecided. A JMC poll of 441 registered voters and likely voters conducted in October 2010 found Thompson leading with 42 percent to Marcy's 41 percent, while 17 percent were undecided. Prior to the election FiveThirtyEight's forecast gave Thompson a 99 percent chance of winning, and projected that he would receive 57 percent of the vote to Marcy's 40 percent.

On election day Thompson was re-elected with 61 percent of the vote to Marcy's 38 percent. Thompson was re-elected in 2012 and 2014. Marcy ran again in the 2nd district in 2012 and sought the Democratic nomination for the U.S. Senate in 2014.

=== Republican primary results ===
Mississippi's 2nd congressional district Republican primary, June 1, 2010
Party	Candidate	Votes	%
Republican	Richard Cook	2,232	34.77
Republican	Bill Marcy	2,231	34.75
Republican	George Bailey	1,957	30.48
Total votes		6,420	100.00

=== Republican primary runoff results ===
Mississippi's 2nd congressional district Republican primary runoff, June 22, 2010
Party	Candidate	Votes	%
Republican	Bill Marcy	3,126	58.36
Republican	Richard Cook	2,230	41.64
Total votes		5,356	100.00

==== Predictions ====
Source	Ranking	As of
The Cook Political Report	Safe D	November 1, 2010
Rothenberg	Safe D	November 1, 2010
Sabato's Crystal Ball	Safe D	November 1, 2010
RCP	Likely D	November 1, 2010
CQ Politics	Safe D	October 28, 2010
New York Times	Safe D	November 1, 2010
FiveThirtyEight	Safe D	November 1, 2010

=== General election results ===
2010 Mississippi's 2nd congressional district election
Party	Candidate	Votes	%
Democratic	Bennie Thompson (incumbent)	105,327	61.47
Republican	Bill Marcy	64,499	37.64
Reform	Ashley Norwood	1,530	0.89
Total votes		171,356	100.00

==== By county ====
County	Bennie Thompson Democratic		Bill Marcy Republican		Ashley Norwood Reform		Margin		Total
County	#	%	#	%	#	%	#	%	Total
Attala	1,989	37.79%	3,210	60.99%	64	1.22%	-1,221	-23.20%	5,263
Bolivar	5,745	62.88%	3,298	36.09%	94	1.03%	2,447	26.78%	9,137
Carroll	1,150	30.83%	2,534	67.94%	46	1.23%	-1,384	-37.10%	3,730
Claiborne	2,629	84.83%	449	14.49%	21	0.68%	2,180	70.35%	3,099
Coahoma	3,535	63.31%	1,988	35.60%	61	1.09%	1,547	27.70%	5,584
Copiah	3,928	47.82%	4,206	51.21%	80	0.97%	-278	-3.38%	8,214
Hinds (part)	40,015	71.01%	15,926	28.26%	413	0.73%	24,089	42.75%	56,354
Holmes	4,419	80.03%	1,068	19.34%	35	0.63%	3,351	60.68%	5,522
Humphreys	2,045	66.90%	977	31.96%	35	1.14%	1,068	34.94%	3,057
Issaquena	266	52.99%	225	44.82%	11	2.19%	41	8.17%	502
Jefferson	2,145	86.74%	312	12.62%	16	0.65%	1,833	74.12%	2,473
Leake (part)	1,542	50.91%	1,450	47.87%	37	1.22%	92	3.04%	3,029
Leflore	4,590	61.35%	2,850	38.09%	42	0.56%	1,740	23.26%	7,482
Madison (part)	5,842	58.51%	4,090	40.97%	52	0.52%	1,752	17.55%	9,984
Montgomery	1,443	43.61%	1,824	55.12%	42	1.27%	-381	-11.51%	3,309
Quitman	1,496	65.99%	714	31.50%	57	2.51%	782	34.49%	2,267
Sharkey	1,050	65.02%	555	34.37%	10	0.62%	495	30.65%	1,615
Sunflower	3,500	63.29%	1,977	35.75%	53	0.96%	1,523	27.54%	5,530
Tallahatchie	2,202	57.05%	1,577	40.85%	81	2.10%	625	16.19%	3,860
Tunica	1,416	73.67%	469	24.40%	37	1.93%	947	49.27%	1,922
Warren	5,173	40.77%	7,402	58.34%	113	0.89%	-2,229	-17.57%	12,688
Washington	6,215	60.59%	3,965	38.66%	77	0.75%	2,250	21.94%	10,257
Yazoo	2,992	46.19%	3,433	52.99%	53	0.82%	-441	-6.81%	6,478
Totals	105,327	61.47%	64,499	37.64%	1,530	0.89%	40,828	23.83%	171,356

=== External links ===
- "Richard Cook campaign website". Archived from the original on March 27, 2010.
- "Bill Marcy campaign website". Archived from the original on October 28, 2010.
- "Bennie Thompson campaign website". Archived from the original on October 28, 2010.

== District 3 ==
2010 Mississippi's 3rd congressional district election

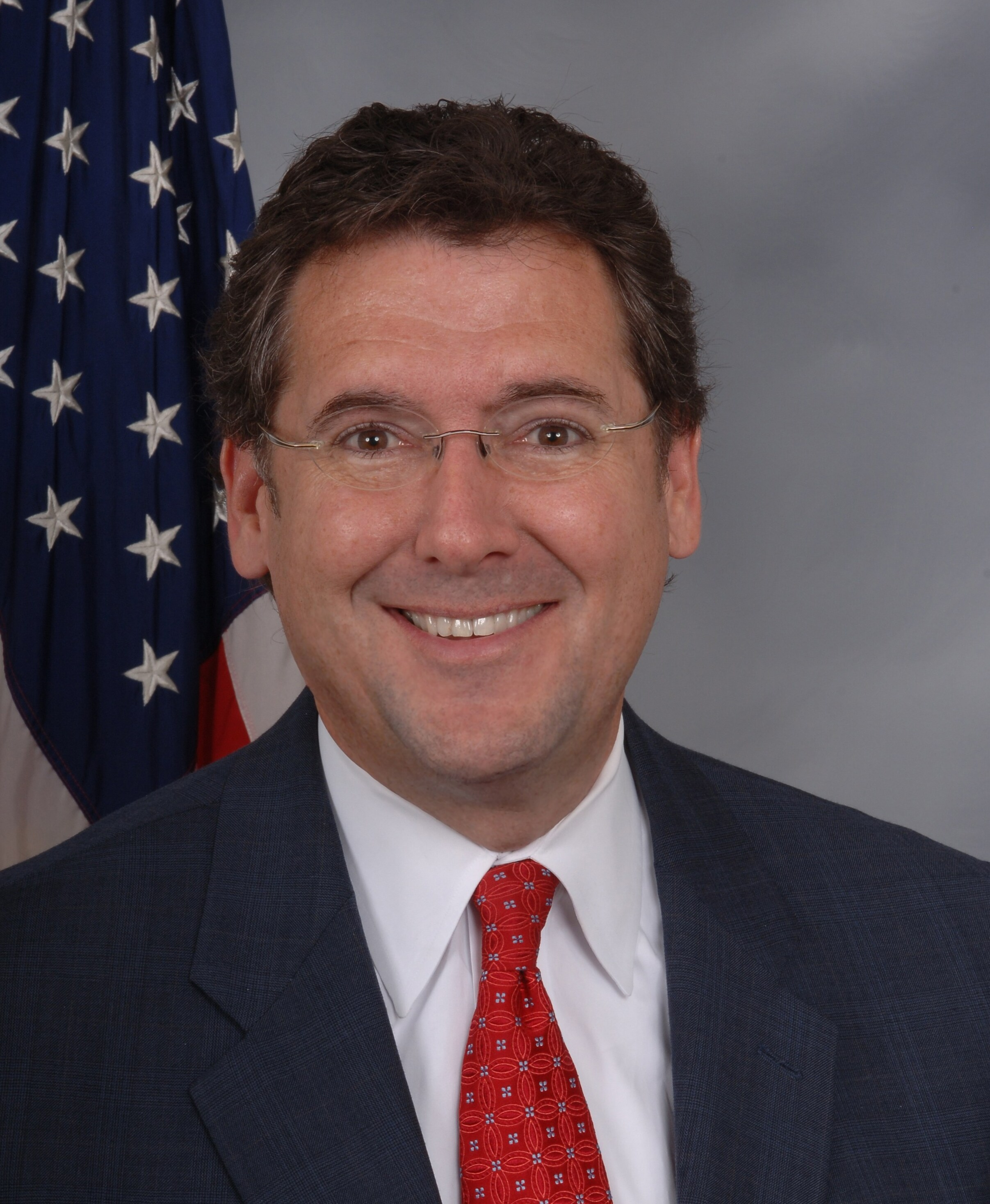

Nominee	Gregg Harper	Joel Gill
Party	Republican	Democratic
Popular vote	132,393	60,737
Percentage	67.99%	31.19%
- Harper: 50–60% 60–70% 70–80% 80–90% Gill: 50–60% 60–70%
U.S. Representative before election
Gregg Harper
Republican
Elected U.S. Representative
Gregg Harper
Republican

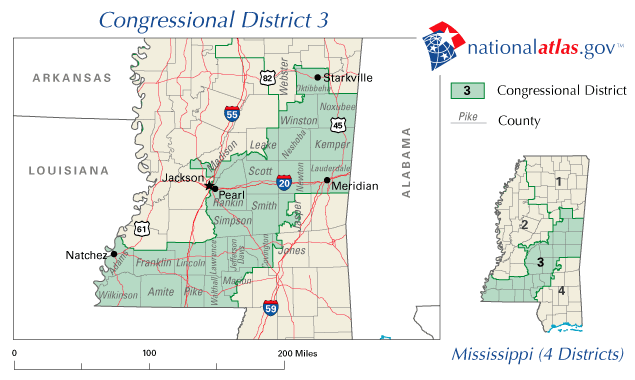
Mississippi's 3rd congressional district in 2010

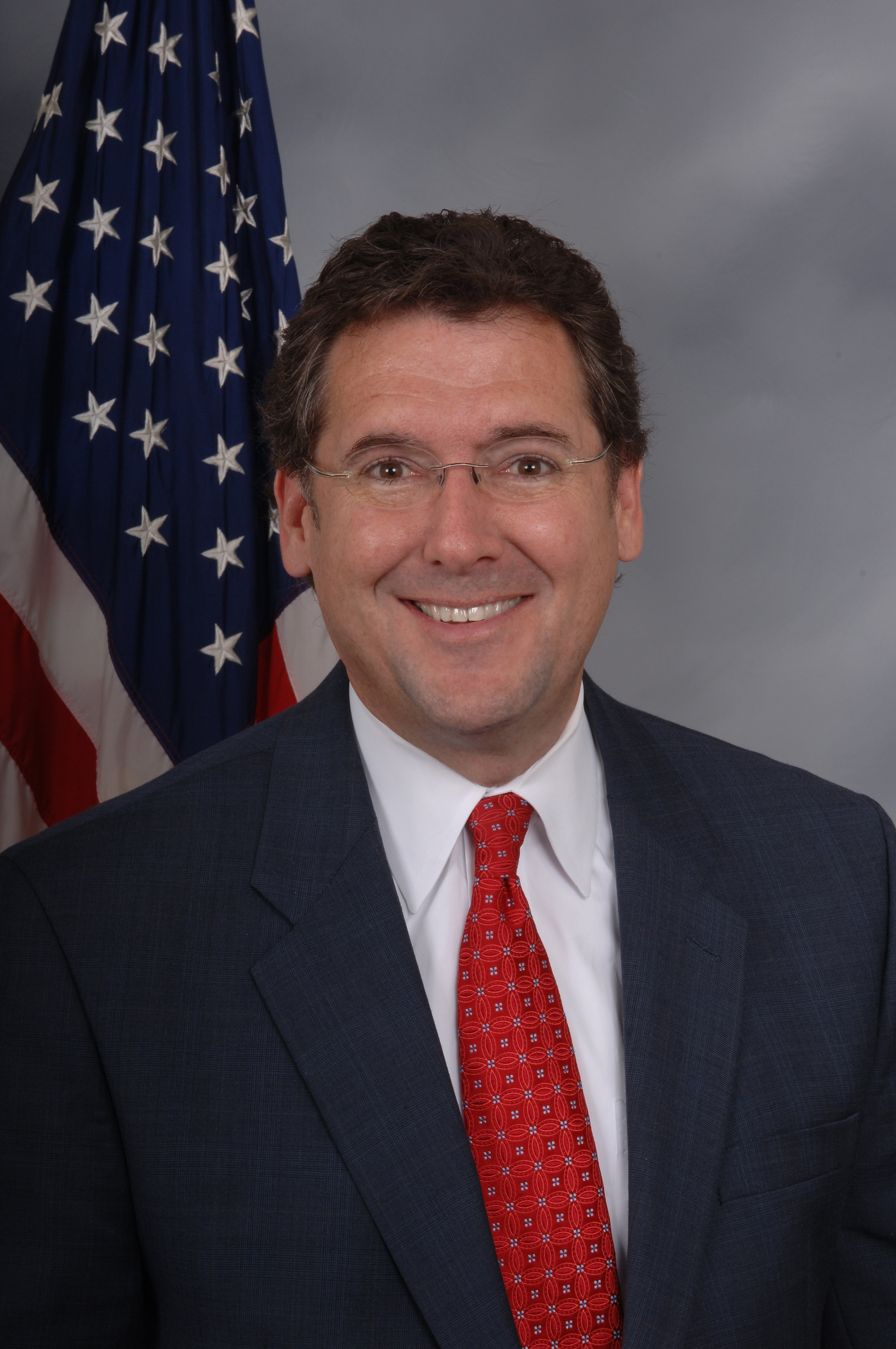
Gregg Harper, who was re-elected as the U.S. representative for the 3rd district

In 2010 the 3rd district included Meridian, Pearl and parts of Jackson. The district's population was 62 percent white and 34 percent black (see Race and ethnicity in the United States census); 81 percent were high school graduates and 23 percent had received a bachelor's degree or higher. Its median income was $38,777. In the 2008 presidential election the district gave 61 percent of its vote to Republican nominee John McCain and 39 percent to Democratic nominee Barack Obama.

Republican Gregg Harper, who was first elected in 2008, was the incumbent. In 2008 Harper received 63 percent of the vote. In 2010 the Democratic nominee was Joel Gill, the mayor of Pickens. James D. Jackson, a sociology professor; and Shawn O'Hara, a frequent candidate for office, also sought the Democratic nomination. O'Hara's sister, Tracella Lou O'Hara Hill, also ran as the Reform Party nominee.

Harper raised $715,014 and spent $688,959. Prior to the election FiveThirtyEight's forecast gave Harper a 100 percent chance of winning, and projected that he would receive 70 percent of the vote to Gill's 28 percent. On election day Harper was re-elected with 68 percent of the vote to Gill's 31 percent. Gill unsuccessfully ran for Mississippi Agriculture Commissioner in 2011, and died in a car accident in October 2012. Harper was again re-elected in 2012 and 2014.

=== Democratic primary results ===
Mississippi's 3rd congressional district Democratic primary, June 1, 2010
Party	Candidate	Votes	%
Democratic	Joel Gill	3,805	52.33
Democratic	James D. Jackson	2,138	29.40
Democratic	Shawn O'Hara	1,328	18.26
Total votes		7,271	100.00

==== Predictions ====
Source	Ranking	As of
The Cook Political Report	Safe R	November 1, 2010
Rothenberg	Safe R	November 1, 2010
Sabato's Crystal Ball	Safe R	November 1, 2010
RCP	Safe R	November 1, 2010
CQ Politics	Safe R	October 28, 2010
New York Times	Safe R	November 1, 2010
FiveThirtyEight	Safe R	November 1, 2010

=== General election results ===
2010 Mississippi's 3rd congressional district election
Party	Candidate	Votes	%
Republican	Gregg Harper (incumbent)	132,393	67.99
Democratic	Joel Gill	60,737	31.19
Reform	Tracella Lou O’Hara Hill	1,586	0.81
Total votes		194,716	100.00

==== By county ====
County	Gregg Harper Republican		Joel Gill Democratic		Tracella Lou O’Hara Hill Reform		Margin		Total
County	#	%	#	%	#	%	#	%	Total
Adams	3,710	47.17%	4,114	52.31%	41	0.52%	-404	-5.14%	7,865
Amite	2,451	61.21%	1,529	38.19%	24	0.60%	922	23.03%	4,004
Covington	3,801	65.09%	1,980	33.90%	59	1.01%	1,821	31.18%	5,840
Franklin	1,493	65.51%	770	33.79%	16	0.70%	723	31.72%	2,279
Hinds (part)	7,261	69.38%	3,165	30.24%	40	0.38%	4,096	39.14%	10,466
Jasper (part)	945	48.96%	969	50.21%	16	0.83%	-24	-1.24%	1,930
Jefferson Davis	1,964	44.57%	2,412	54.73%	31	0.70%	-448	-10.17%	4,407
Jones (part)	503	62.64%	287	35.74%	13	1.62%	216	26.90%	803
Kemper	1,168	43.02%	1,531	56.39%	16	0.59%	-363	-13.37%	2,715
Lauderdale	10,750	66.17%	5,424	33.38%	73	0.45%	5,326	32.78%	16,247
Lawrence	2,696	66.52%	1,322	32.62%	35	0.86%	1,374	33.90%	4,053
Leake (part)	1,681	67.43%	799	32.05%	13	0.52%	882	35.38%	2,493
Lincoln	5,872	70.99%	2,367	28.61%	33	0.40%	3,505	42.37%	8,272
Madison (part)	14,083	77.97%	3,880	21.48%	100	0.55%	10,203	56.49%	18,063
Marion (part)	2,390	75.54%	749	23.67%	25	0.79%	1,641	51.86%	3,164
Neshoba	4,424	75.75%	1,373	23.51%	43	0.74%	3,051	52.24%	5,840
Newton	3,903	70.85%	1,569	28.48%	37	0.67%	2,334	42.37%	5,509
Noxubee	1,026	29.78%	2,394	69.49%	25	0.73%	-1,368	-39.71%	3,445
Oktibbeha	6,023	56.36%	4,581	42.87%	83	0.78%	1,442	13.49%	10,687
Pike	5,059	58.23%	3,542	40.77%	87	1.00%	1,517	17.46%	8,688
Rankin	31,297	85.00%	4,974	13.51%	549	1.49%	26,323	71.49%	36,820
Scott	3,665	62.28%	2,187	37.16%	33	0.56%	1,478	25.11%	5,885
Simpson	4,740	67.67%	2,225	31.76%	40	0.57%	2,515	35.90%	7,005
Smith	4,094	77.61%	1,138	21.57%	43	0.82%	2,956	56.04%	5,275
Walthall	3,124	61.00%	1,921	37.51%	76	1.48%	1,203	23.49%	5,121
Webster (part)	182	75.21%	57	23.55%	3	1.24%	125	51.65%	242
Wilkinson	821	38.84%	1,285	60.79%	8	0.38%	-464	-21.95%	2,114
Winston (part)	3,267	59.57%	2,193	39.99%	24	0.44%	1,074	19.58%	5,484
Totals	132,393	67.99%	60,737	31.19%	1,586	0.81%	71,656	36.80%	194,716

=== External links ===
- "Joel Gill campaign website". Archived from the original on October 29, 2010.
- "Gregg Harper campaign website". Archived from the original on October 29, 2010.

== District 4 ==
2010 Mississippi's 4th congressional district election

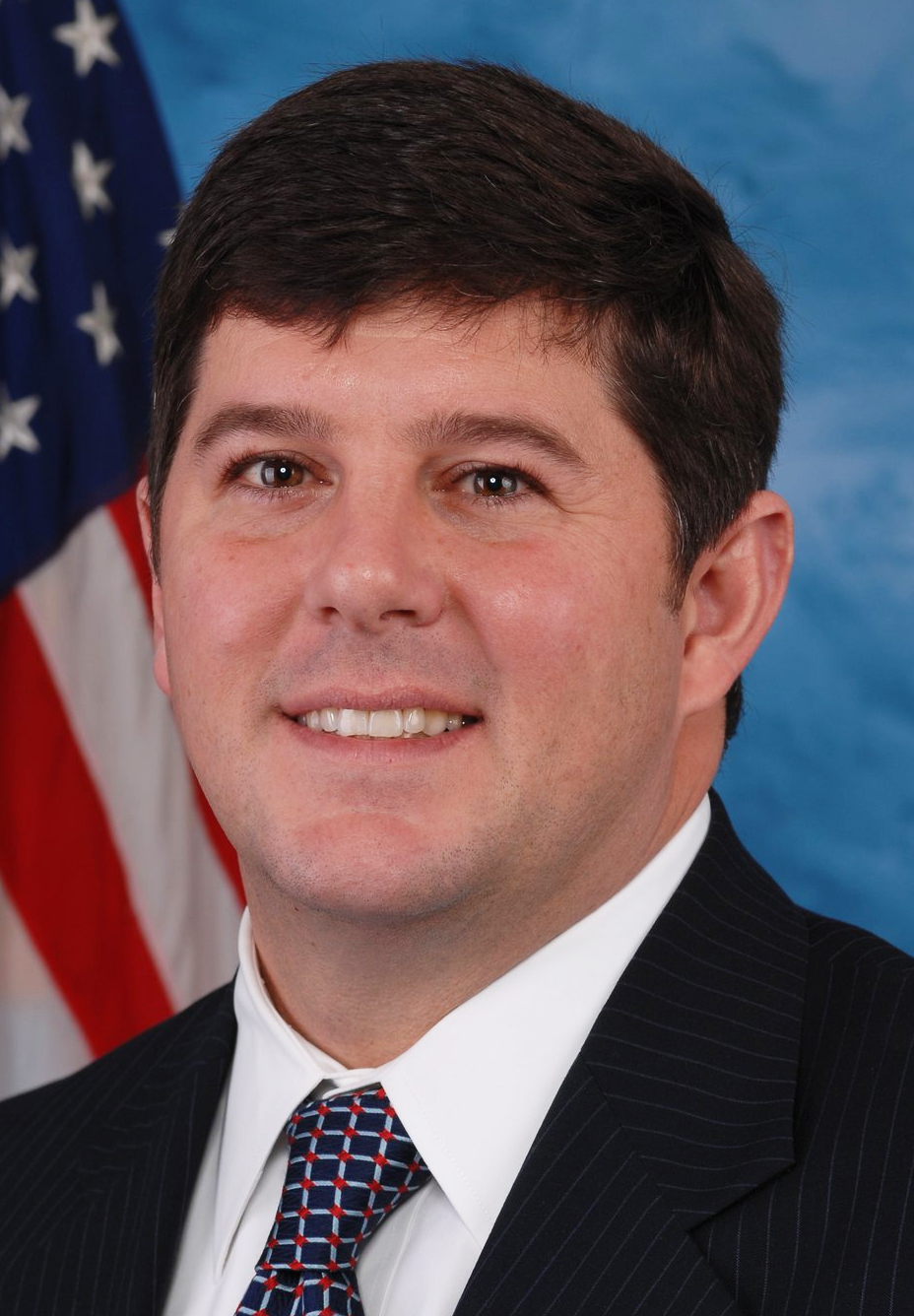

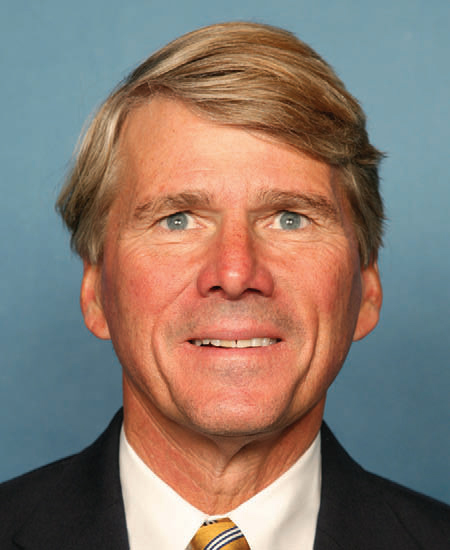
Nominee	Steven Palazzo	Gene Taylor
Party	Republican	Democratic
Popular vote	105,613	95,243
Percentage	51.9%	46.8%
- County results Palazzo: 50–60% 60–70% Taylor: 40–50% 50–60%
U.S. Representative before election
Gene Taylor
Democratic
Elected U.S. Representative
Steven Palazzo
Republican

In 2010 the 4th district included Gulfport and Hattiesburg. The district's population was 71 percent white and 23 percent black (see Race and ethnicity in the United States census); 81 percent were high school graduates and 18 percent had received a bachelor's degree or higher. Its median income was $41,245. In the 2008 presidential election the district gave 67 percent of its vote to Republican nominee John McCain and 32 percent to Democratic nominee Barack Obama.

Democrat Gene Taylor, who took office in 1989, was the incumbent. Taylor was re-elected in 2008 with 75 percent of the vote. In 2010 Taylor's opponent in the general election was Steven Palazzo, a member of the Mississippi House of Representatives. Joe Tegerdine, a businessman, also sought the Republican nomination. Tim Hampton, the Libertarian Party nominee, and Anna Jewel Revies, the nominee of the Reform Party, also ran.

Taylor raised $855,983 and spent $968,943. Palazzo raised $1,079,453 and spent $1,026,476. Tegerdine raised $74,586 and spent $74,500.

In a poll by the Tarrance Group, conducted for Palazzo's campaign in September 2010, 45 percent of respondents supported Taylor while 41 percent favored Palazzo. In October 2010 Taylor said his own internal polling showed him leading Palazzo by eight percentage points. Another poll by Tarrance for Palazzo's campaign, conducted later in October 2010 with a sample size of 300 likely voters, Palazzo led with 43 percent to Taylor's 41 percent, while 3 percent supported other candidates and 12 percent were undecided.

On election day Palazzo was elected with 52 percent of the vote to Taylor's 47 percent. Palazzo was re-elected in 2012 and 2014. In 2014 Taylor unsuccessfully challenged Palazzo in the Republican primary in the 4th district.

=== Republican primary results ===
Mississippi's 4th congressional district Republican primary, June 1, 2010
Party	Candidate	Votes	%
Republican	Steven Palazzo	15,556	57.15
Republican	Joe Tegerdine	11,663	42.85
Total votes		27,219	100.00

==== Predictions ====
Source	Ranking	As of
The Cook Political Report	Tossup	November 1, 2010
Rothenberg	Tossup	November 1, 2010
Sabato's Crystal Ball	Lean D	November 1, 2010
RCP	Tossup	November 1, 2010
CQ Politics	Tossup	October 28, 2010
New York Times	Tossup	November 1, 2010
FiveThirtyEight	Tossup	November 1, 2010

=== General election results ===
2010 Mississippi's 4th congressional district election
Party	Candidate	Votes	%
Republican	Steven Palazzo	105,613	51.93
Democratic	Gene Taylor (incumbent)	95,243	46.83
Libertarian	Tim Hampton	1,741	0.86
Reform	Anna Jewel Revies	787	0.39
Total votes		203,384	100.00

==== By county ====
County	Gene Taylor Democratic		Steven Palazzo Republican		Various candidates Other parties		Margin		Total
County	#	%	#	%	#	%	#	%	Total
Clarke	1,823	36.44%	3,107	62.10%	73	1.46%	1,284	25.66%	5,003
Forrest	9,467	49.65%	9,250	48.51%	350	1.84%	-217	-1.14%	19,067
George	3,161	40.80%	4,507	58.18%	79	1.02%	1,346	17.37%	7,747
Greene	1,474	42.38%	1,975	56.79%	29	0.83%	501	14.40%	3,478
Hancock	6,487	54.58%	5,266	44.31%	132	1.11%	-1,221	-10.27%	11,885
Harrison	24,845	57.53%	17,917	41.49%	421	0.97%	-6,928	-16.04%	43,183
Jackson	18,463	50.72%	17,588	48.32%	350	0.96%	-875	-2.40%	36,401
Jasper (part)	2,141	57.49%	1,538	41.30%	45	1.21%	-603	-16.19%	3,724
Jones (part)	7,513	38.31%	11,834	60.35%	263	1.34%	4,321	22.03%	19,610
Lamar	5,546	32.07%	11,484	66.40%	265	1.53%	5,938	34.33%	17,295
Marion (part)	2,051	41.73%	2,790	56.77%	74	1.51%	739	15.04%	4,915
Pearl River	4,678	30.20%	10,570	68.24%	242	1.56%	5,892	38.04%	15,490
Perry	1,698	46.73%	1,874	51.57%	62	1.71%	176	4.84%	3,634
Stone	2,661	52.94%	2,302	45.80%	63	1.25%	-359	-7.14%	5,026
Wayne	3,235	46.71%	3,611	52.14%	80	1.16%	376	5.43%	6,926
Totals	95,243	46.83%	105,613	51.93%	2,528	1.24%	10,370	5.10%	203,384

=== Further reading ===
- Lansford, Tom (2011). "Mississippi District 4 Race (Palazzo v. Taylor): A Conservative Democrat Loses to a More Conservative Republican". In Foreman, Sean D.; Dewhirst, Robert (eds.). The Roads to Congress 2010. Lanham, Maryland: Lexington Books. pp. 55–66.

=== External links ===
- "Tim Hampton campaign website". Archived from the original on October 29, 2010.
- "Steve Palazzo campaign website". Archived from the original on October 28, 2010.
- "Gene Taylor campaign website". Archived from the original on October 30, 2010.
- "Joe Tegerdine campaign website". Archived from the original on February 12, 2010.

== See also ==
- List of United States representatives from Mississippi
- Mississippi's congressional delegations
