= Mississippi's 4th congressional district =

U.S. House district for Mississippi

Coordinates: 30°59′37″N 89°05′02″W

- Interactive map of district boundaries since January 3, 2023
- Representative: Mike Ezell; R–Pascagoula
- Area: 9,536 mi^{2} (24,700 km^{2})
- Distribution: 53.72% urban; 46.28% rural
- Population (2025): 763,504
- Median household income: $63,738
- Ethnicity: 65.7% White; 22.7% Black; 5.3% Hispanic; 4.0% Two or more races; 1.6% Asian; 0.7% other
- Occupation: 51.9% White-collar; 30.6% Blue-collar; 18.4% Gray-collar
- Cook PVI: R+21

Mississippi's 4th congressional district covers the southeastern region of the state. It includes all of Mississippi's Gulf Coast, stretching ninety miles between the Alabama border to the east and the Louisiana border to the west, and extends north into the Pine Belt region. It includes three of Mississippi's four most heavily populated cities: Gulfport, Biloxi, and Hattiesburg. Other major cities within the district include Bay St. Louis, Laurel, and Pascagoula. The district is currently represented by Republican Mike Ezell. With a Cook Partisan Voting Index rating of R+21, it is the most Republican district in Mississippi.

From statehood to the election of 1846, Mississippi elected representatives at-large statewide on a general ticket. From 1973 to 2003, the district included most of Jackson, all of Natchez and the southwestern part of the state. In 2003, after Mississippi lost a seat in redistricting, the old 4th District was eliminated. Most of Jackson, as well as the bulk of the district's black constituents, were drawn into the 2nd District, while eastern Jackson and most of Jackson's suburbs were drawn into the 3rd District. As a result, most of the old 5th District was redefined as the new 4th District.

The perimeter of the current Fourth District extends across the ninety-mile coastal southern edge of Mississippi from the Louisiana border to the Alabama border, following the Alabama state line north along the eastern border of the state to a point due east of Quitman in Clarke County where it is bounded by the 3rd District and then moves in an irregular fashion south of Quitman until it reaches the county line with Wayne County, and then follows the northern and western borders to wholly contain Jones, Forrest, Lamar, and Marion counties until it reaches the Louisiana state line, ultimately bounded by the Pearl River winding to its outlet in Lake Borgne.

Interstate 59 is an important north–south route that traverses the district, while coastal Interstate 10 serves as the major east–west route from New Orleans to Mobile. US Highway 49 is a vital hurricane evacuation route and is four-laned from Gulfport to Jackson. US Highway 84 enters the state near Waynesboro and is four-laned statewide, passing through Laurel, Brookhaven and Natchez.

== History ==
The district, like most of Mississippi, is built on a strong history of agriculture. Politically, the district has been conservative even by Mississippi standards. What is now the 4th has not supported the official Democratic candidate for president since 1956. Since the turn of the millennium, it has given the Republican presidential candidate his highest margin in the state.

Long after this area turned solidly Republican at the federal level, conservative Democrats like longtime congressman Gene Taylor still held a number of local offices. Nevertheless, it was a foregone conclusion that Taylor would be succeeded by a Republican. This came to pass in 2010, when then-state representative Palazzo narrowly defeated Taylor in that year's massive Republican wave. The Democrats have only put up nominal challengers in the district since then; only one Democrat has managed even 30 percent of the vote. Indeed, the Democrats did not even field a candidate in 2020. Palazzo's win touched off a wave of Republican victories down ballot, and today there are almost no elected Democrats left above the county level. Underscoring this, Taylor sought to take back his old seat in 2014 as a Republican.

=== Counties ===
Since 2013 the entire counties of Hancock, Harrison, Jackson, Pearl River, Stone, George, Marion, Lamar, Forrest, Perry, Greene, Jones, and Wayne, along with the southeastern part of Clarke are counted in this district.

Then, in 2021, Clarke county is redistricted into one county and is added to the 3rd district along with Marion county. Jones County, on the other hand, was split into two parts thanks to 2020 redistricting, with the northern part of the county being added to the 3rd district and the rest of the county in this district.

== Recent election results from statewide races ==
| Year | Office | Results |
|---|---|---|
| 2008 | President | McCain 68% - 31% |
| 2008 | Senate (Reg.) | Cochran 74% - 26% |
| 2008 | Senate (Spec.) | Wicker 62% - 38% |
| 2012 | President | Romney 69% - 31% |
| 2016 | President | Trump 69% - 28% |
| 2018 | Senate (Reg.) | Wicker 68% - 30% |
| 2018 | Senate (Spec.) | Hyde-Smith 65% - 35% |
| 2019 | Governor | Reeves 63% - 35% |
| 2019 | Lt. Governor | Hosemann 70% - 30% |
| 2019 | Attorney General | Fitch 68% - 32% |
| 2020 | President | Trump 68% - 30% |
| 2020 | Senate | Hyde-Smith 63% - 34% |
| 2023 | Governor | Reeves 62% - 36% |
| 2023 | Lt. Governor | Hosemann 71% - 29% |
| 2023 | Secretary of State | Watson 70% - 30% |
| 2023 | Attorney General | Fitch 69% - 31% |
| 2023 | Auditor | White 69% - 31% |
| 2023 | Treasurer | McRae 69% - 31% |
| 2024 | President | Trump 71% - 28% |
| 2024 | Senate | Wicker 72% - 28% |
| 2026 | Senate | Hyde-Smith 57 - 39% |

== Composition ==
The 4th district includes all of the following counties, with the exception of Jones, which it shares with the 3rd district. Jones County communities in the 4th district include Soso, Ellisville, Moselle, Ovett, Eastabuchie (shared with Forrest County), and most of Laurel.

| # | County | Seat | Population |
|---|---|---|---|
| 35 | Forrest | Hattiesburg | 78,208 |
| 39 | George | Lucedale | 25,619 |
| 41 | Greene | Leakesville | 13,601 |
| 45 | Hancock | Bay St. Louis | 46,159 |
| 47 | Harrison | Gulfport, Biloxi | 210,612 |
| 59 | Jackson | Pascagoula | 146,389 |
| 67 | Jones | Laurel, Ellisville | 66,250 |
| 73 | Lamar | Purvis | 66,217 |
| 109 | Pearl River | Poplarville | 57,978 |
| 111 | Perry | New Augusta | 11,315 |
| 131 | Stone | Wiggins | 18,756 |
| 153 | Wayne | Waynesboro | 19,703 |

== List of members representing the district ==
| Member | Party | Years | Cong ress | Electoral history | District location and map |
|---|---|---|---|---|---|
District created March 4, 1847
| Albert G. Brown (Gallatin) | Democratic | March 4, 1847 — March 3, 1853 | 30th 31st 32nd | Elected in 1847. Re-elected in 1849. Re-elected in 1851. Retired. | |
| Wiley Pope Harris (Monticello) | Democratic | March 4, 1853 — March 3, 1855 | 33rd | Elected in 1853. Retired. | |
| William Augustus Lake (Vicksburg) | Know Nothing | March 4, 1855 — March 3, 1857 | 34th | Elected in 1855. Lost re-election. | |
| Otho Robards Singleton (Canton) | Democratic | March 4, 1857 — January 12, 1861 | 35th 36th | Elected in 1857. Re-elected in 1859. Withdrew due to Civil War. | |
| Vacant | | January 12, 1861 — February 23, 1870 | 36th 37th 38th 39th 40th 41st | Civil War and Reconstruction | |
| George Colin McKee (Vicksburg) | Republican | February 23, 1870 — March 3, 1873 | 41st 42nd | Elected in 1868 but that election was rejected by the House. Elected again in 1869 to finish the term and to the next term. Redistricted to the 5th district. | |
| Jason Niles (Kosciusko) | Republican | March 4, 1873 — March 3, 1875 | 43rd | Elected in 1872. Lost re-election. | |
| Otho Robards Singleton (Canton) | Democratic | March 4, 1875 — March 3, 1883 | 44th 45th 46th 47th | Elected in 1874. Re-elected in 1876. Re-elected in 1878. Re-elected in 1880. Redistricted to the 5th district. | |
| Hernando D. Money (Winona) | Democratic | March 4, 1883 — March 3, 1885 | 48th | Redistricted from the 3rd district and re-elected in 1882. Retired. | |
| Frederick G. Barry (West Point) | Democratic | March 4, 1885 — March 3, 1889 | 49th 50th | Elected in 1884. Re-elected in 1886. Retired. | |
| Clarke Lewis (Macon) | Democratic | March 4, 1889 — March 3, 1893 | 51st 52nd | Elected in 1888. Re-elected in 1890. Retired. | |
| Hernando D. Money (Carrollton) | Democratic | March 4, 1893 — March 3, 1897 | 53rd 54th | Elected in 1892. Re-elected in 1894. Retired. | |
| Andrew F. Fox (West Point) | Democratic | March 4, 1897 — March 3, 1903 | 55th 56th 57th | Elected in 1896. Re-elected in 1898. Re-elected in 1900. Retired. | |
| Wilson S. Hill (Winona) | Democratic | March 4, 1903 — March 3, 1909 | 58th 59th 60th | Elected in 1902. Re-elected in 1904. Re-elected in 1906. Lost renomination. | |
| Thomas U. Sisson (Winona) | Democratic | March 4, 1909 — March 3, 1923 | 61st 62nd 63rd 64th 65th 66th 67th | Elected in 1908. Re-elected in 1910. Re-elected in 1912. Re-elected in 1914. Re-elected in 1916. Re-elected in 1918. Re-elected in 1920. Lost renomination. | |
| T. Jeff Busby (Houston) | Democratic | March 4, 1923 — January 3, 1935 | 68th 69th 70th 71st 72nd 73rd | Elected in 1922. Re-elected in 1924. Re-elected in 1926. Re-elected in 1928. Re-elected in 1930. Re-elected in 1932. Lost renomination. | |
| Aaron L. Ford (Ackerman) | Democratic | January 3, 1935 — January 3, 1943 | 74th 75th 76th 77th | Elected in 1934. Re-elected in 1936. Re-elected in 1938. Re-elected in 1940. Lost renomination. | |
| Thomas G. Abernethy (Okolona) | Democratic | January 3, 1943 — January 3, 1953 | 78th 79th 80th 81st 82nd | Elected in 1942. Re-elected in 1944. Re-elected in 1946. Re-elected in 1948. Re-elected in 1950. Redistricted to the 1st district. | |
| John B. Williams (Raymond) | Democratic | January 3, 1953 — January 3, 1963 | 83rd 84th 85th 86th 87th | Redistricted from the 7th district and re-elected in 1952. Re-elected in 1954. Re-elected in 1956. Re-elected in 1958. Re-elected in 1960. Redistricted to the 3rd district. | |
| W. Arthur Winstead (Philadelphia) | Democratic | January 3, 1963 — January 3, 1965 | 88th | Redistricted from the 5th district and re-elected in 1962. Lost re-election. | |
| Prentiss Walker (Mize) | Republican | January 3, 1965 — January 3, 1967 | 89th | Elected in 1964. Retired to run for U.S. senator. | |
| Sonny Montgomery (Meridian) | Democratic | January 3, 1967 — January 3, 1973 | 90th 91st 92nd | Elected in 1966. Re-elected in 1968. Re-elected in 1970. Redistricted to the 3rd district. | |
| Thad Cochran (Jackson) | Republican | January 3, 1973 — December 26, 1978 | 93rd 94th 95th | Elected in 1972. Re-elected in 1974. Re-elected in 1976. Retired to run for U.S senator and resigned when appointed senator. | |
| Vacant | | December 26, 1978 — January 3, 1979 | 95th | | |
| Jon Hinson (Tylertown) | Republican | January 3, 1979 — April 13, 1981 | 96th 97th | Elected in 1978. Re-elected in 1980. Resigned due to arrest for attempted sodomy. | |
| Vacant | | April 13, 1981 — July 7, 1981 | 97th | | |
| Wayne Dowdy (McComb) | Democratic | July 7, 1981 — January 3, 1989 | 97th 98th 99th 100th | Elected to finish Hinson's term. Re-elected in 1982. Re-elected in 1984. Re-elected in 1986. Retired to run for U.S senator. | |
| Mike Parker (Brookhaven) | Democratic | January 3, 1989 — November 10, 1995 | 101st 102nd 103rd 104th 105th | Elected in 1988. Re-elected in 1990. Re-elected in 1992. Re-elected in 1994. Re-elected in 1996. Retired to run for Governor of Mississippi. | |
| Mike Parker (Brookhaven) | Republican | November 10, 1995 — January 3, 1999 | 101st 102nd 103rd 104th 105th | Elected in 1988. Re-elected in 1990. Re-elected in 1992. Re-elected in 1994. Re-elected in 1996. Retired to run for Governor of Mississippi. | |
| Ronnie Shows (Bassfield) | Democratic | January 3, 1999 — January 3, 2003 | 106th 107th | Elected in 1998. Re-elected in 2000. Redistricted to the 3rd district and lost re-election. | |
| Gene Taylor (Bay St. Louis) | Democratic | January 3, 2003 — January 3, 2011 | 108th 109th 110th 111th | Redistricted from the 5th district and re-elected in 2002. Re-elected in 2004. Re-elected in 2006. Re-elected in 2008. Lost re-election. | 2003–2013 |
| Steven Palazzo (Biloxi) | Republican | January 3, 2011 – January 3, 2023 | 112th 113th 114th 115th 116th 117th | Elected in 2010. Re-elected in 2012. Re-elected in 2014. Re-elected in 2016. Re-elected in 2018. Re-elected in 2020. Lost renomination. | 2003–2013 |
| Steven Palazzo (Biloxi) | Republican | January 3, 2011 – January 3, 2023 | 112th 113th 114th 115th 116th 117th | Elected in 2010. Re-elected in 2012. Re-elected in 2014. Re-elected in 2016. Re-elected in 2018. Re-elected in 2020. Lost renomination. | 2013–2023 |
| Mike Ezell (Pascagoula) | Republican | January 3, 2023 – present | 118th 119th | Elected in 2022. Re-elected in 2024. Re-elected in 2026. | 2023–present |

== Recent elections ==
=== 2002 ===
2002 Fourth Congressional District of Mississippi Elections
| Party | Candidate | Votes | % | ±% |
|---|---|---|---|---|
| Democratic | Gene Taylor (incumbent) | 121,742 | 75.21 | − |
| Republican | Dr. Karl Cleveland Mertz | 34,373 | 21.24 | − |
| Libertarian | Wayne L. Parker | 3,311 | 2.05 | − |
| Reform | Thomas R. Huffmaster | 2,442 | 1.51 | − |
| Turnout | | 161,868 | | |
| Majority | | 87,369 | 53.98 | |

=== 2004 ===
2004 Fourth Congressional District of Mississippi Elections
| Party | Candidate | Votes | % | ±% |
|---|---|---|---|---|
| Democratic | Gene Taylor (incumbent) | 181,614 | 64.77 | −10.44 |
| Republican | Mike Lott | 96,740 | 34.50 | +13.26 |
| Reform | Tracella Hill | 2,028 | 0.72 | −0.79 |
| Turnout | | 280,382 | | |
| Majority | | 84,874 | 30.27 | |

=== 2006 ===
Fourth District incumbent Gene Taylor (D) was re-elected, gathering 80% of the Fourth District's vote. He is considered one of the most conservative Democrats in the House . His district has a Cook Political Report rating of R+16.

Taylor faced challenger Randall "Randy" McDonnell, a former IRS agent. McDonnell, the Republican Party nominee, had also unsuccessfully challenged Taylor in both 1998 and 2000.

Taylor first was elected in 1989 to Mississippi's 5th congressional district, after having lost to Larkin I. Smith in the 1988 race for that open seat, which had been vacated by Trent Lott when Lott made a successful run for the Senate. Smith died eight months later in a plane crash. Taylor came in first in the special election primary to fill the seat, winning the runoff election two weeks later and taking office on October 18, 1989.

In 1990, Taylor won a full term in the 5th District with 81% of the vote, and has been reelected at each election since.

His district was renumbered the 4th after the redistricting of 2000, which cost Mississippi a Congressional seat. In 2004, Taylor was reelected to the House with 64% of their vote, choosing him over both Republican nominee Michael Lott and Reform nominee Tracella Hill.

2006 Fourth Congressional District of Mississippi Elections
| Party | Candidate | Votes | % | ±% |
|---|---|---|---|---|
| Democratic | Gene Taylor (incumbent) | 110,996 | 79.79 | +15.02 |
| Republican | Randall "Randy" McDonnell | 28,117 | 20.21 | −14.29 |
| Turnout | | 139,113 | | |
| Majority | | 82,879 | 59.58 | |

=== 2008 ===
2006 Fourth Congressional District of Mississippi Elections
| Party | Candidate | Votes | % | ±% |
|---|---|---|---|---|
| Democratic | Gene Taylor (incumbent) | | 74.54 | −5.25 |
| Republican | John McCay | | 25.46 | +5.25 |
| Turnout | | | | |
| Majority | | | 49.08 | |

=== 2010 ===
2010 Fourth Congressional District of Mississippi Elections
| Party | Candidate | Votes | % | ±% |
|---|---|---|---|---|
| Republican | Steven Palazzo | 105,613 | 51.93 | +26.47 |
| Democratic | Gene Taylor (incumbent) | 95,243 | 46.83 | −27.45 |
| Libertarian | Tim Hampton | 1,741 | 0.86 | +0.86 |
| Reform | Anna Revies | 787 | 0.39 | +0.39 |
| Turnout | | 203,384 | | |
| Majority | | 9,480 | 4.84 | |

=== 2012 ===
Mississippi's 4th congressional district, 2012
| Party | Candidate | Votes | % |
|---|---|---|---|
| Republican | Steven Palazzo (incumbent) | 182,998 | 64.1 |
| Democratic | Matt Moore | 82,344 | 28.9 |
| Libertarian | Ron Williams | 17,982 | 6.3 |
| Reform | Robert Claunch | 2,108 | 0.7 |
| Total votes | | 285,432 | 100.0 |
| Republican hold | | | |

=== 2014 ===
Mississippi's 4th congressional district, 2014
| Party | Candidate | Votes | % |
|---|---|---|---|
| Republican | Steven Palazzo (incumbent) | 108,776 | 69.9 |
| Democratic | Matt Moore | 37,869 | 24.3 |
| Independent | Cindy Burleson | 3,684 | 2.4 |
| Libertarian | Joey Robinson | 3,473 | 2.2 |
| Reform | Eli Jackson | 917 | 0.6 |
| Independent | Ed Reich | 857 | 0.6 |
| Total votes | | 155,576 | 100.0 |
| Republican hold | | | |

=== 2016 ===
Mississippi's 4th congressional district, 2016
| Party | Candidate | Votes | % |
|---|---|---|---|
| Republican | Steven Palazzo (incumbent) | 181,323 | 65.0 |
| Democratic | Mark Gladney | 77,505 | 27.8 |
| Libertarian | Richard Blake McCluskey | 14,687 | 5.3 |
| Reform | Shawn O'Hara | 5,264 | 1.9 |
| Total votes | | 278,779 | 100.0 |
| Republican hold | | | |

=== 2018 ===
Mississippi's 4th congressional district, 2018
| Party | Candidate | Votes | % |
|---|---|---|---|
| Republican | Steven Palazzo (incumbent) | 152,633 | 68.2 |
| Democratic | Jeramey Anderson | 68,787 | 30.8 |
| Reform | Lajena Sheets | 2,312 | 1.0 |
| Total votes | | 223,732 | 100.0 |
| Republican hold | | | |

=== 2020 ===
Mississippi's 4th congressional district, 2020
| Party | Candidate | Votes | % |
|---|---|---|---|
| Republican | Steven Palazzo (incumbent) | 255,971 | 100.0 |
| Total votes | | 255,971 | 100.0 |
| Republican hold | | | |

=== 2022 ===
Mississippi's 4th congressional district, 2022
| Party | Candidate | Votes | % |
|---|---|---|---|
| Republican | Mike Ezell | 127,813 | 73.35 |
| Democratic | Johnny DuPree | 42,876 | 24.60 |
| Libertarian | Alden Patrick Johnson | 3,569 | 2.05 |
| Total votes | | 174,258 | 100.00 |
| Republican hold | | | |

=== 2024 ===
Mississippi's 4th congressional district, 2024
| Party | Candidate | Votes | % |
|---|---|---|---|
| Republican | Mike Ezell | 215,095 | 73.95 |
| Democratic | Craig Raybon | 75,771 | 26.05 |
| Total votes | | 290,866 | 100.00 |
| Republican hold | | | |

== See also ==
- Mississippi's congressional districts
- List of United States congressional districts
