= 2012 United States House of Representatives elections in Mississippi =

- November 6, 2012

All 4 Mississippi seats to the United States House of Representatives
	Majority party	Minority party	Third party
Party	Republican	Democratic	Reform
Last election	3	1	0
Seats won	3	1	0
Seat change	Steady	Steady	Steady
Popular vote	703,635	411,398	64,581
Percentage	58.24%	34.05%	5.35%
Swing	▲4.53%	▼10.42%	▲4.81%

Republican
40–50%
50–60%
60–70%
70–80%
80–90%
Democratic
40–50%
50–60%
60–70%
70–80%
80–90%

The 2012 United States House of Representatives elections in Mississippi were held on Tuesday, November 6, 2012, and elected the four U.S. representatives from the state of Mississippi. The elections coincided with the elections of other federal and state offices, including a quadrennial presidential election and an election to the U.S. Senate.

== Overview ==
United States House of Representatives elections in Mississippi, 2012
Party	Votes	Percentage	Seats	+/–
Republican	703,635	58.24%	3	Steady
Democratic	411,398	34.05%	1	Steady
Reform	64,581	5.35%	0	Steady
Libertarian	21,566	1.79%	0	Steady
Constitution	2,390	0.20%	0	Steady
Independents	4,605	0.38%	0	Steady
Totals	1,208,175	100.00%	4	Steady

== District 1 ==
2012 Mississippi's 1st congressional district election

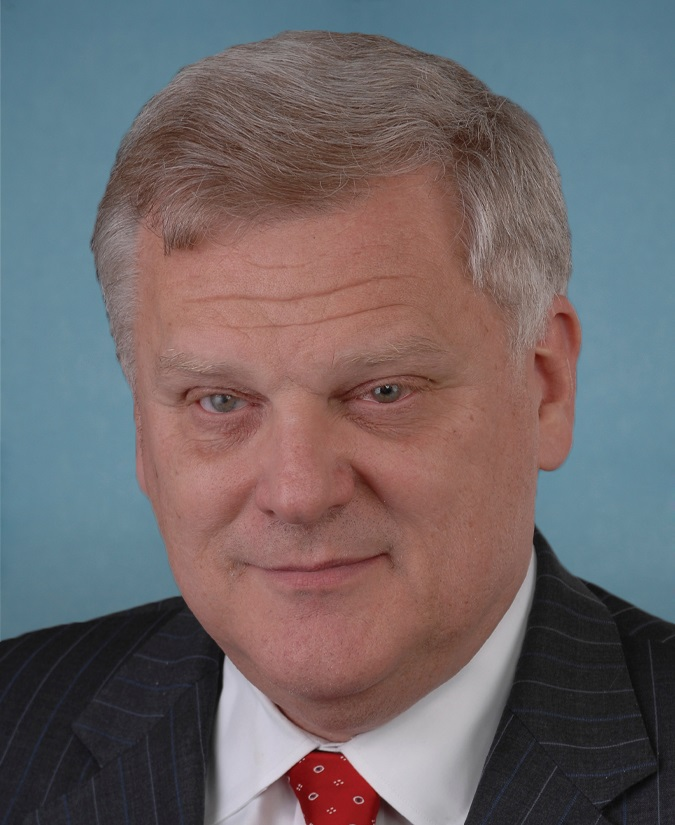

Nominee	Alan Nunnelee	Brad Morris
Party	Republican	Democratic
Popular vote	186,760	114,076
Percentage	60.4%	36.9%
- County results Nunnelee: 40–50% 50–60% 60–70% 70–80% Morris: 40–50% 50–60%
U.S. Representative before election
Alan Nunnelee
Republican
Elected U.S. Representative
Alan Nunnelee
Republican

Republican Alan Nunnelee, who has represented Mississippi's 1st congressional district since January 2011, ran for re-election.

=== Republican primary ===
==== Candidates ====
===== Nominee =====
- Alan Nunnelee, incumbent U.S. Representative

===== Eliminated in primary =====
- Robert Estes, owner of Estes Grading and Trucking
- Henry Ross, former mayor of Eupora and candidate for this seat in 2010

==== Primary results ====
Republican primary results
Party	Candidate	Votes	%
Republican	Alan Nunnelee (incumbent)	43,518	57.4
Republican	Henry Ross	22,067	28.9
Republican	Robert Estes	10,394	13.7
Total votes		75,979	100.0

=== Democratic primary ===
==== Candidates ====
===== Nominee =====
- Brad Morris, attorney and former chief of staff to former representative Travis Childers

===== Withdrawn =====
- Mark DuVall, former state Representative

==== Primary results ====
Democratic primary results
Party	Candidate	Votes	%
Democratic	Brad Morris	11,120	100.0
Total votes		11,120	100.0

=== Reform primary ===
==== Candidates ====
===== Nominee =====
- Chris Potts

=== Libertarian primary ===
==== Candidates ====
===== Nominee =====
- Danny Bedwell

=== Constitution primary ===
==== Candidates ====
===== Nominee =====
- Jim Bourland

=== General election ===
==== Predictions ====
Source	Ranking	As of
The Cook Political Report	Safe R	November 5, 2012
Rothenberg	Safe R	November 2, 2012
Roll Call	Safe R	November 4, 2012
Sabato's Crystal Ball	Safe R	November 5, 2012
NY Times	Safe R	November 4, 2012
RCP	Safe R	November 4, 2012
The Hill	Safe R	November 4, 2012

==== Results ====
2012 Mississippi's 1st congressional district election
Party	Candidate	Votes	%
Republican	Alan Nunnelee (incumbent)	186,760	60.4
Democratic	Brad Morris	114,076	36.9
Libertarian	Danny Bedwell	3,584	1.2
Constitution	Jim R. Bourland	2,390	0.8
Reform	Chris Potts	2,367	0.8
Total votes		309,177	100.0
Republican hold			

==== By county ====
County	Alan Nunnelee Republican		Brad Morris Democratic		Various candidates Other parties		Margin		Total
County	#	%	#	%	#	%	#	%	Total
Alcorn	9,713	68.31%	3,856	27.12%	650	4.57%	5,857	41.19%	14,219
Benton	1,891	49.14%	1,830	47.56%	127	3.30%	61	1.59%	3,848
Calhoun	4,158	61.34%	2,429	35.83%	192	2.83%	1,729	25.51%	6,779
Chickasaw	3,814	47.41%	3,995	49.66%	236	2.93%	-181	-2.25%	8,045
Choctaw	2,704	66.40%	1,236	30.35%	132	3.24%	1,468	36.05%	4,072
Clay	4,355	41.20%	5,975	56.52%	241	2.28%	-1,620	-15.32%	10,571
DeSoto	42,284	65.88%	20,171	31.43%	1,730	2.70%	22,113	34.45%	64,185
Itawamba	5,824	63.78%	3,078	33.71%	229	2.51%	2,746	30.07%	9,131
Lafayette	10,609	55.96%	7,837	41.34%	513	2.71%	2,772	14.62%	18,959
Lee	21,108	60.88%	12,946	37.34%	619	1.79%	8,162	23.54%	34,673
Lowndes	13,424	51.21%	11,979	45.70%	810	3.09%	1,445	5.51%	26,213
Marshall	6,284	41.81%	8,289	55.15%	457	3.04%	-2,005	-13.34%	15,030
Monroe	9,302	57.13%	6,607	40.58%	373	2.29%	2,695	16.55%	16,282
Oktibbeha (part)	753	54.60%	582	42.20%	44	3.19%	171	12.40%	1,379
Pontotoc	8,837	73.36%	2,919	24.23%	290	2.41%	5,918	49.13%	12,046
Prentiss	6,215	63.85%	3,310	34.01%	208	2.14%	2,905	29.85%	9,733
Tate	6,985	59.08%	4,469	37.80%	369	3.12%	2,516	21.28%	11,823
Tippah	6,243	70.48%	2,326	26.26%	289	3.26%	3,917	44.22%	8,858
Tishomingo	5,432	70.86%	1,992	25.98%	242	3.16%	3,440	44.87%	7,666
Union	7,972	71.90%	2,853	25.73%	262	2.36%	5,119	46.17%	11,087
Webster	3,788	75.04%	1,135	22.48%	125	2.48%	2,653	52.56%	5,048
Winston	5,065	53.15%	4,262	44.72%	203	2.13%	803	8.43%	9,530
Totals	186,760	60.41%	114,076	36.90%	8,341	2.70%	72,684	23.51%	309,177

== District 2 ==
2012 Mississippi's 2nd congressional district election

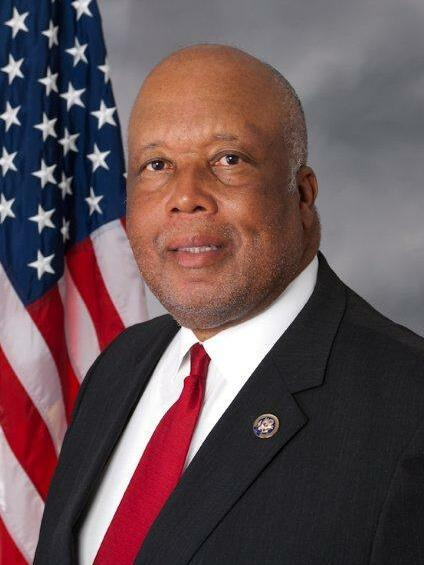

Nominee	Bennie Thompson	Bill Marcy
Party	Democratic	Republican
Popular vote	214,978	99,160
Percentage	67.1%	31.0%
- County results Thompson: 50–60% 60–70% 70–80% 80–90% Marcy: 50–60% 60–70%
U.S. Representative before election
Bennie Thompson
Democratic
Elected U.S. Representative
Bennie Thompson
Democratic

Democrat Bennie Thompson, who had represented Mississippi's 2nd congressional district since 1993, ran for re-election.

=== Democratic primary ===
==== Candidates ====
===== Nominee =====
- Bennie Thompson, incumbent U.S. Representative

===== Eliminated in primary =====
- Heather McTeer Toney, Mayor of Greenville

==== Primary results ====
Democratic primary results
Party	Candidate	Votes	%
Democratic	Bennie Thompson (incumbent)	49,083	87.45
Democratic	Heather McTeer	7,040	12.55
Total votes		56,123	100.0

=== Republican primary ===
==== Candidates ====
===== Nominee =====
- Bill Marcy, nominee for this seat in 2010

==== Primary results ====
Republican primary results
Party	Candidate	Votes	%
Republican	Bill Marcy	26,041	100.0
Total votes		26,041	100.0

=== Reform primary ===
==== Candidates ====
===== Nominee =====
- Lajena Williams

=== Independents ===
- Cobby Williams, motivational speaker

=== General election ===
==== Predictions ====
Source	Ranking	As of
The Cook Political Report	Safe D	November 5, 2012
Rothenberg	Safe D	November 2, 2012
Roll Call	Safe D	November 4, 2012
Sabato's Crystal Ball	Safe D	November 5, 2012
NY Times	Safe D	November 4, 2012
RCP	Safe D	November 4, 2012
The Hill	Safe D	November 4, 2012

==== Results ====
2012 Mississippi's 2nd congressional district election
Party	Candidate	Votes	%
Democratic	Bennie Thompson (incumbent)	214,978	67.1
Republican	Bill Marcy	99,160	31.0
Independent	Cobby Mondale Williams	4,605	1.4
Reform	Lajena Williams	1,501	0.5
Total votes		320,244	100.0
Democratic hold			

==== By county ====
County	Bennie Thompson Democratic		Bill Marcy Republican		Various candidates Other parties		Margin		Total
County	#	%	#	%	#	%	#	%	Total
Attala	4,169	47.91%	4,364	50.15%	169	1.94%	-195	-2.24%	8,702
Bolivar	10,584	70.72%	4,173	27.88%	209	1.40%	6,411	42.84%	14,966
Carroll	2,134	36.74%	3,610	62.14%	65	1.12%	-1,476	-25.41%	5,809
Claiborne	4,680	86.97%	616	11.45%	85	1.58%	4,064	75.52%	5,381
Coahoma	7,562	74.77%	2,388	23.61%	164	1.62%	5,174	51.16%	10,114
Copiah	7,848	57.54%	5,576	40.88%	215	1.58%	2,272	16.66%	13,639
Grenada	5,493	50.91%	5,113	47.39%	184	1.71%	380	3.52%	10,790
Hinds (part)	67,763	73.49%	22,274	24.16%	2,169	2.35%	45,489	49.33%	92,206
Holmes	7,364	83.56%	1,302	14.77%	147	1.67%	6,062	68.78%	8,813
Humphreys	3,901	77.11%	1,096	21.66%	62	1.23%	2,805	55.45%	5,059
Issaquena	468	61.34%	284	37.22%	11	1.44%	184	24.12%	763
Jefferson	3,782	88.53%	442	10.35%	48	1.12%	3,340	78.18%	4,272
Leake	4,227	50.22%	4,044	48.05%	146	1.73%	183	2.17%	8,417
Leflore	8,898	71.40%	3,427	27.50%	138	1.11%	5,471	43.90%	12,463
Madison (part)	10,148	78.84%	2,233	17.35%	490	3.81%	7,915	61.49%	12,871
Montgomery	2,848	52.68%	2,473	45.75%	85	1.57%	375	6.94%	5,406
Panola	8,979	56.55%	6,547	41.23%	352	2.22%	2,432	15.32%	15,878
Quitman	2,680	71.50%	998	26.63%	70	1.87%	1,682	44.88%	3,748
Sharkey	1,777	72.89%	637	26.13%	24	0.98%	1,140	46.76%	2,438
Sunflower	8,277	75.18%	2,599	23.61%	133	1.21%	5,678	51.58%	11,009
Tallahatchie	4,130	65.79%	2,026	32.27%	122	1.94%	2,104	33.51%	6,278
Tunica	3,232	79.08%	753	18.42%	102	2.50%	2,479	60.66%	4,087
Warren	10,399	50.14%	9,959	48.02%	383	1.85%	440	2.12%	20,741
Washington	13,863	72.63%	5,032	26.36%	191	1.00%	8,831	46.27%	19,086
Yalobusha	3,160	50.89%	2,904	46.77%	145	2.34%	256	4.12%	6,209
Yazoo	6,612	59.57%	4,290	38.65%	197	1.77%	2,322	20.92%	11,099
Totals	214,978	67.13%	99,160	30.96%	6,106	1.91%	115,818	36.17%	320,244

== District 3 ==
2012 Mississippi's 3rd congressional district election

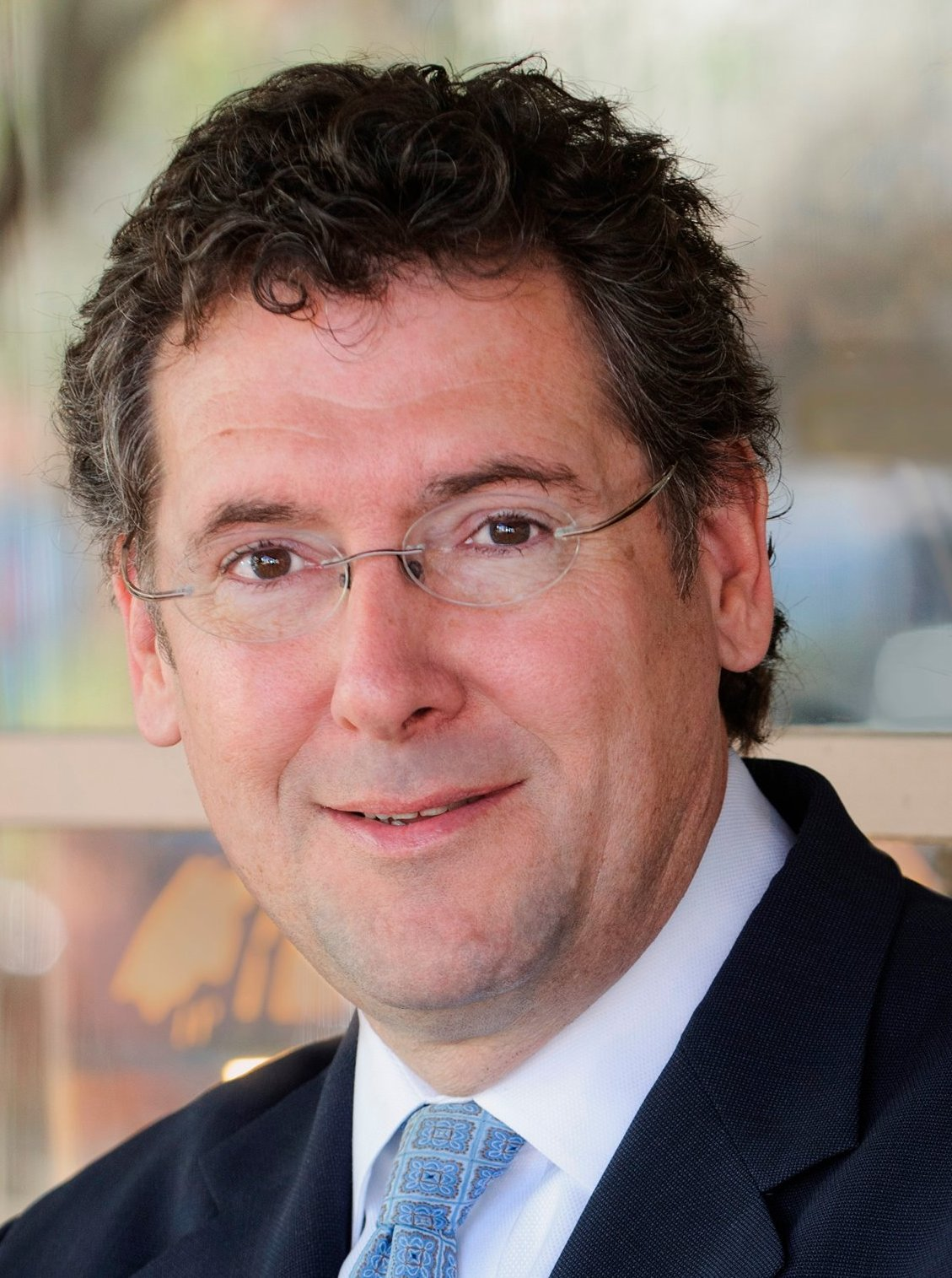

Nominee	Gregg Harper	John Luke Pannell
Party	Republican	Reform
Popular vote	209,490	58,605
Percentage	80.0%	20.0%
- County results Harper: 50–60% 60–70% 70–80% 80–90%
U.S. Representative before election
Gregg Harper
Republican
Elected U.S. Representative
Gregg Harper
Republican

Republican Gregg Harper, who has represented Mississippi's 3rd congressional district since 2009, ran for re-election.

=== Republican primary ===
==== Candidates ====
===== Nominee =====
- Gregg Harper, incumbent U.S. Representative

===== Eliminated in primary =====
- Robert Allen, Tea Party activist

==== Primary results ====
Republican primary results
Party	Candidate	Votes	%
Republican	Gregg Harper (incumbent)	78,735	91.8
Republican	Robert Allen	7,027	8.2
Total votes		85,762	100.0

=== Democratic primary ===
==== Candidates ====
===== Nominee =====
- Crystal Biggs

==== Primary results ====
Democratic primary results
Party	Candidate	Votes	%
Democratic	Crystal Biggs	15,291	100.0
Total votes		15,291	100.0

=== Reform primary ===
==== Candidates ====
===== Nominee =====
- John "Luke" Pannell

=== General election ===
==== Campaign ====
Crystal Biggs, who had received the Democratic nomination unopposed, dropped out of the race in September 2012 because of an illness.

==== Predictions ====
Source	Ranking	As of
The Cook Political Report	Safe R	November 5, 2012
Rothenberg	Safe R	November 2, 2012
Roll Call	Safe R	November 4, 2012
Sabato's Crystal Ball	Safe R	November 5, 2012
NY Times	Safe R	November 4, 2012
RCP	Safe R	November 4, 2012
The Hill	Safe R	November 4, 2012

==== Results ====
2012 Mississippi's 3rd congressional district election
Party	Candidate	Votes	%
Republican	Gregg Harper (incumbent)	234,717	80.0
Reform	John Luke Pannell	58,605	20.0
Total votes		293,322	100.0
Republican hold			

==== By county ====
County	Gregg Harper Republican		John Luke Pannell Reform		Margin		Total
County	#	%	#	%	#	%	Total
Adams	7,503	71.14%	3,044	28.86%	4,459	42.28%	10,547
Amite	4,968	77.14%	1,472	22.86%	3,496	54.29%	6,440
Clarke (part)	5,047	82.23%	1,091	17.77%	3,956	64.45%	6,138
Covington	6,076	75.38%	1,984	24.62%	4,092	50.77%	8,060
Franklin	3,124	81.46%	711	18.54%	2,413	62.92%	3,835
Hinds (part)	8,914	76.36%	2,759	23.64%	6,155	52.73%	11,673
Jasper	5,080	68.11%	2,379	31.89%	2,701	36.21%	7,459
Jefferson Davis	3,379	60.69%	2,189	39.31%	1,190	21.37%	5,568
Kemper	2,563	62.09%	1,565	37.91%	998	24.18%	4,128
Lauderdale	22,375	81.63%	5,036	18.37%	17,339	63.26%	27,411
Lawrence	4,745	79.03%	1,259	20.97%	3,486	58.06%	6,004
Lincoln	11,983	80.10%	2,977	19.90%	9,006	60.20%	14,960
Madison (part)	29,043	87.02%	4,332	12.98%	24,711	74.04%	33,375
Neshoba	8,631	85.51%	1,463	14.49%	7,168	71.01%	10,094
Newton	7,084	83.02%	1,449	16.98%	5,635	66.04%	8,533
Noxubee	2,012	55.84%	1,591	44.16%	421	11.68%	3,603
Oktibbeha (part)	9,698	72.83%	3,618	27.17%	6,080	45.66%	13,316
Pike	10,185	69.15%	4,544	30.85%	5,641	38.30%	14,729
Rankin	53,172	88.55%	6,876	11.45%	46,296	77.10%	60,048
Scott	7,412	76.98%	2,217	23.02%	5,195	53.95%	9,629
Simpson	8,573	80.83%	2,033	19.17%	6,540	61.66%	10,606
Smith	6,484	85.53%	1,097	14.47%	5,387	71.06%	7,581
Walthall	4,572	75.90%	1,452	24.10%	3,120	51.79%	6,024
Wilkinson	2,094	58.80%	1,467	41.20%	627	17.61%	3,561
Totals	234,717	80.02%	58,605	19.98%	176,112	60.04%	293,322

== District 4 ==
2012 Mississippi's 4th congressional district election

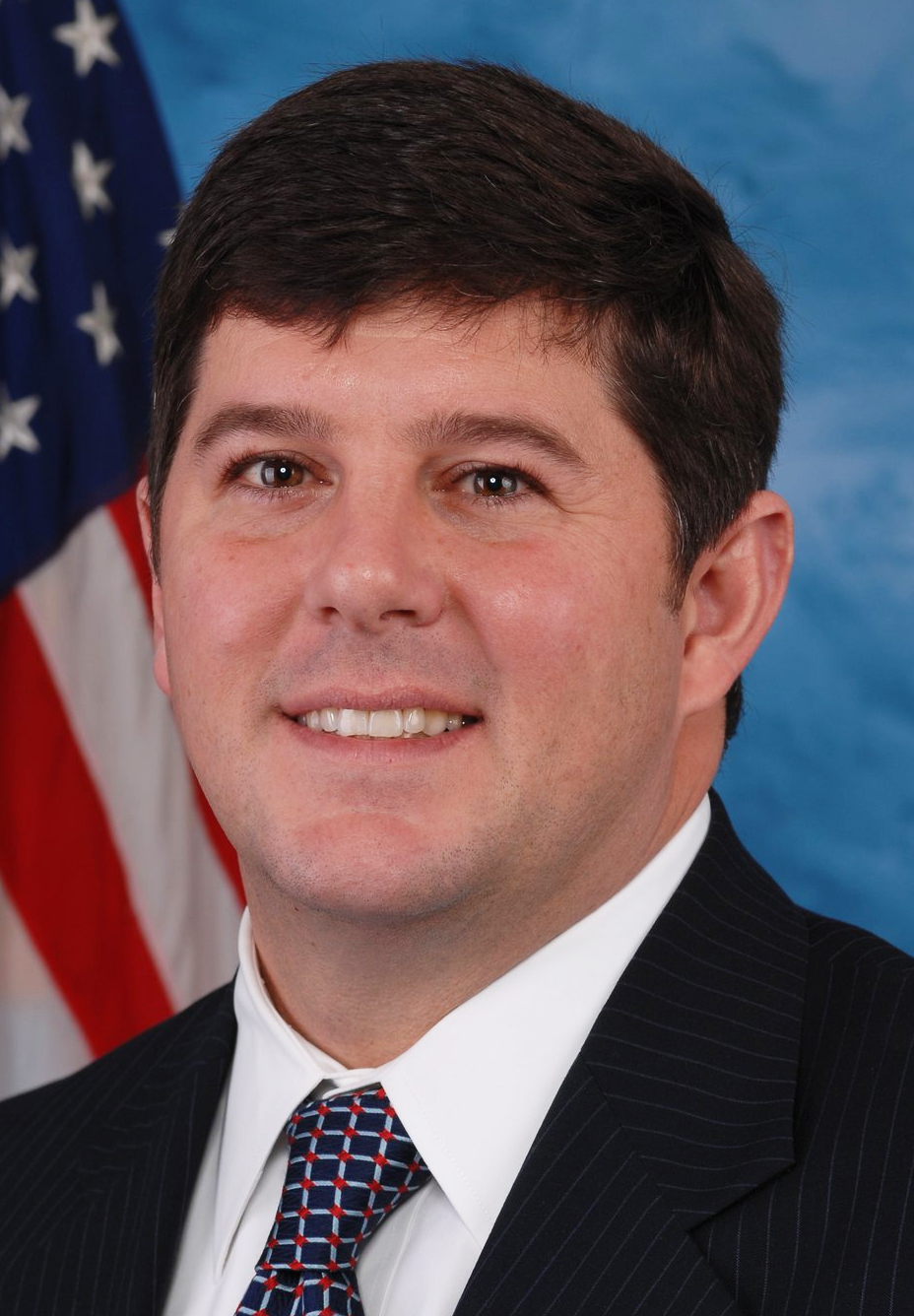

Nominee	Steven Palazzo	Matthew Moore	Ron Williams
Party	Republican	Democratic	Libertarian
Popular vote	182,998	82,344	17,982
Percentage	64.1%	28.9%	6.3%
- County results Palazzo: 50–60% 60–70% 70–80% Moore: 50–60%
U.S. Representative before election
Steven Palazzo
Republican
Elected U.S. Representative
Steven Palazzo
Republican

Republican Steven Palazzo, who has represented Mississippi's 4th congressional district since January 2011, ran for re-election.

=== Republican primary ===
==== Candidates ====
===== Nominee =====
- Steven Palazzo, incumbent U.S. Representative

===== Eliminated in primary =====
- Cindy Burleson, political activist;
- Ron Vincent, Tea Party activist and retired engineer

===== Declined =====
- Chris McDaniel, state senator
- Brian Sanderson, lawyer
- Michael Watson, state Senator

==== Primary results ====
Republican primary results
Party	Candidate	Votes	%
Republican	Steven Palazzo (incumbent)	60,897	73.9
Republican	Ron Vincent	15,391	18.7
Republican	Cindy Burleson	6,100	7.4
Total votes		82,388	100.0

=== Democratic primary ===
==== Candidates ====
===== Nominee =====
- Michael Herrington, service manager

===== Eliminated in primary =====
- Jason Vitosky, businessman

===== Declined =====
- Gene Taylor, former U.S. Representative

==== Primary results ====
Democratic primary results
Party	Candidate	Votes	%
Democratic	Michael Herrington	8,988	83.8
Democratic	Jason Vitosky	1,743	16.2
Total votes		10,731	100.0

=== Reform primary ===
==== Candidates ====
===== Nominee =====
- Robert Claunch

=== Libertarian primary ===
==== Candidates ====
===== Nominee =====
- Ron Williams, businessman and Republican candidate for governor in 2011

=== General election ===
==== Campaign ====
Herrington dropped out of the race in September 2012 because of his mother's illness and financial concerns. He was replaced as Democratic nominee by Matthew Moore, an honours student at Mississippi Gulf Coast Community College.

==== Predictions ====
Source	Ranking	As of
The Cook Political Report	Safe R	November 5, 2012
Rothenberg	Safe R	November 2, 2012
Roll Call	Safe R	November 4, 2012
Sabato's Crystal Ball	Safe R	November 5, 2012
NY Times	Safe R	November 4, 2012
RCP	Safe R	November 4, 2012
The Hill	Safe R	November 4, 2012

==== Results ====
2012 Mississippi's 4th congressional district election
Party	Candidate	Votes	%
Republican	Steven Palazzo (incumbent)	182,998	64.1
Democratic	Matthew Moore	82,344	28.8
Libertarian	Ron Williams	17,982	6.3
Reform	Robert Claunch	2,108	0.7
Total votes		285,432	100.0
Republican hold			

==== By county ====
County	Steven Palazzo Republican		Matthew Moore Democratic		Various candidates Other parties		Margin		Total
County	#	%	#	%	#	%	#	%	Total
Clarke (part)	447	40.93%	593	54.30%	52	4.76%	-146	-13.37%	1,092
Forrest	16,090	55.23%	11,492	39.45%	1,551	5.32%	4,598	15.78%	29,133
George	7,464	78.73%	1,429	15.07%	587	6.19%	6,035	63.66%	9,480
Greene	4,034	70.78%	1,275	22.37%	390	6.84%	2,759	48.41%	5,699
Hancock	11,152	67.13%	3,850	23.18%	1,610	9.69%	7,302	43.96%	16,612
Harrison	35,917	57.80%	21,096	33.95%	5,132	8.26%	14,821	23.85%	62,145
Jackson	31,931	61.76%	15,025	29.06%	4,745	9.18%	16,906	32.70%	51,701
Jones	19,558	67.60%	7,957	27.50%	1,417	4.90%	11,601	40.10%	28,932
Lamar	18,150	74.66%	4,785	19.68%	1,374	5.65%	13,365	54.98%	24,309
Marion	7,922	64.35%	3,980	32.33%	409	3.32%	3,942	32.02%	12,311
Pearl River	15,842	74.43%	4,087	19.20%	1,356	6.37%	11,755	55.23%	21,285
Perry	3,803	69.95%	1,279	23.52%	355	6.53%	2,524	46.42%	5,437
Stone	4,774	65.54%	1,776	24.38%	734	10.08%	2,998	41.16%	7,284
Wayne	5,914	59.07%	3,720	37.16%	378	3.78%	2,194	21.91%	10,012
Totals	182,998	64.11%	82,344	28.85%	20,090	7.04%	100,654	35.26%	285,432
