= Mike Lott =

American politician from Mississippi

Mike Lott is a former state legislator in Mississippi. He served in the Mississippi House of Representatives from 2000 to 2007. A Republican, in 2004 he campaigned for the seat held by incumbent U.S. congressman Gene Taylor. He ran for Mississippi Secretary of State in 2007.

He is on the Board of Alderman in Petal.
