= Larkin I. Smith =

American politician (1944–1989)

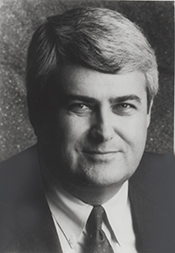

Member of the U.S. House of Representatives from Mississippi's 5th district
- In office January 3, 1989 – August 13, 1989
- Preceded by: Trent Lott
- Succeeded by: Gene Taylor

Personal details
- Born: June 26, 1944 Poplarville, Mississippi, U.S.
- Died: August 13, 1989 (aged 45) Perry County, Mississippi, U.S.
- Party: Republican
- Spouse: Sheila Smith
- Profession: Law enforcement officer

Larkin Irvin Smith (June 26, 1944 – August 13, 1989) was an American congressman from Mississippi serving for seven months until he was killed in a plane crash in Perry County, Mississippi in 1989.

Smith was born in Poplarville, Mississippi to Nona Orene Bounds and her husband Hezekiah K. Smith Sr. Smith was named after his maternal grandfather Larkin Bounds and his maternal uncle Irvin E. Bounds. He received his bachelor's degree from William Carey University and then served at various positions in the police forces in both Pearl River and then Harrison counties. He became the police chief in Gulfport and thereafter the Harrison County sheriff.

In 1988, Smith ran for the U.S. House of Representatives as a Republican from Mississippi's 5th congressional district in the southern portion of the state after eight-term incumbent Trent Lott gave up the seat to make a successful run for the Senate.

He defeated Democratic State Senator Gene Taylor and took office on January 3, 1989. However, Smith died on the night of August 13 in a plane crash in rural Perry County near Gulfport after returning from opening the Little League baseball "Dixie Youth World Series" in Hattiesburg. The bodies of Smith and pilot Chuck Vierling were not recovered until the next morning after a search in which rescuers had to bulldoze their way through the forest. Smith's death came only six days after fellow Representative Mickey Leland of Texas died in a plane crash in Ethiopia on August 7, 1989.

Taylor would succeed Smith in a special election held some two months after the crash, beating Republican candidate Tom Anderson. Taylor was reelected every two years until 2010, when he was defeated by Republican State Representative Steven Palazzo.

== See also ==
- List of members of the United States Congress who died in office (1950–1999)
