= Alan Nunnelee =

American businessman and politician (1958–2015)

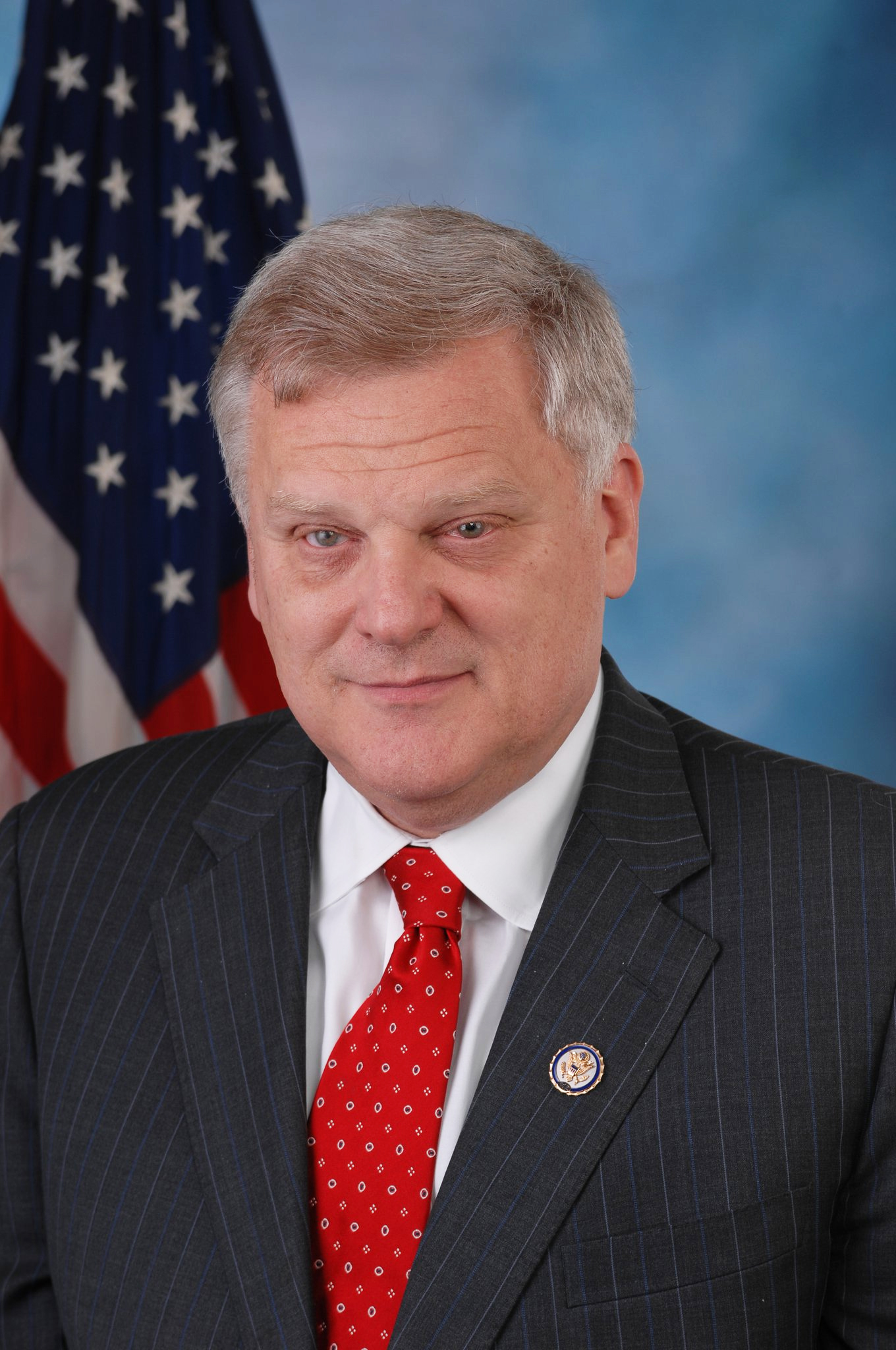
- Official portrait, 2011

Member of the U.S. House of Representatives from Mississippi's 1st district
- In office January 3, 2011 – February 6, 2015
- Preceded by: Travis Childers
- Succeeded by: Trent Kelly

Member of the Mississippi Senate from the 6th district
- In office January 2, 1995 – January 3, 2011
- Preceded by: Roger Wicker
- Succeeded by: Nancy Adams Collins

Personal details
- Born: Patrick Alan Nunnelee; October 9, 1958 Tupelo, Mississippi, U.S.
- Died: February 6, 2015 (aged 56) Tupelo, Mississippi, U.S.
- Party: Republican
- Spouse: Tori Nunnelee
- Children: 3
- Education: Mississippi State University

Patrick Alan Nunnelee (October 9, 1958 – February 6, 2015) was an American businessman and politician who served as the U.S. representative for Mississippi's 1st congressional district from 2011 until his death in 2015. Previously he served in the Mississippi State Senate, representing the 6th district, from 1995 to 2011. He was a member of the Republican Party.

== Early life, education, and business career ==
Nunnelee was born in Tupelo, Mississippi. Nunnelee graduated from Clinton High School in Clinton, Mississippi, in 1976 and then attended Mississippi State University (MSU), graduating with a bachelor's degree in 1980. While a student at MSU, he lost much of his eyesight to a degenerative eye disease. Although legally blind he continued his studies. His sight was restored after receiving cornea transplants.

Nunnelee was employed by American Funeral Assurance Co., eventually becoming vice president of sales and marketing. His father was also employed by the company, rising to president and CEO. In 1996, Nunnelee and his father founded Allied Funeral Associates, Inc. and Allied Funeral Associates Insurance Company and he has served as Vice-President and Director of both entities.

Before beginning his political career he was a popular speaker, crediting God, organ donors, and organizations such as the Lions Club for having his eyesight restored.

== Mississippi Senate ==
=== Elections ===
In 1995, incumbent Republican State Senator Roger Wicker of the 6th district resigned in order to take up a seat in the U.S. House of Representatives. Nunnelee ran and won. In 1999, he won re-election to a second term unopposed. In 2003, he won re-election to a third term with 69% of the vote. In 2007, he won re-election to a fourth term with 66% of the vote.

=== Committee assignments ===
- Senate Committee on Appropriations

== U.S. House of Representatives ==
=== Elections ===
==== 2010 ====
In the Republican primary for Mississippi's 1st congressional district, Wicker's old congressional seat, Nunnelee (52%) defeated Henry Ross (33%) and Angela McGlowan (15%). In the November 2010 general election, Nunnelee defeated Democratic incumbent U.S. Congressman Travis Childers 55%-41%.

==== 2012 ====
After redistricting, Eupora Mayor Henry Ross and businessman Robert Estes ran against Nunnelee in the Republican primary. Nunnelee won the March 2012 primary with 57% of the vote. Ross received 29% and Estes 14%.

==== 2014 ====
Nunnelee ran for re-election in 2014. He was the only Congressman in Mississippi who did not face a primary opponent in 2014.

Nunnelee won the general election with 68% of the vote.

=== Tenure ===
In 2011, Nunnelee became a co-sponsor of Bill H.R.3261 otherwise known as the Stop Online Piracy Act.

=== Committee assignments ===
- Committee on Appropriations
  - Subcommittee on Agriculture, Rural Development, Food and Drug Administration, and Related Agencies
  - Subcommittee on Energy and Water Development
  - Subcommittee on Military Construction, Veterans Affairs, and Related Agencies

=== Caucus memberships ===
- Congressional Diabetes Caucus
- Congressional Prayer Caucus
- Immigration Reform Caucus
- International Conservation Caucus
- Sportsmen's Caucus
- Congressional Cement Caucus
- Congressional Constitution Caucus

== Personal life ==
Nunnelee was a Southern Baptist. He married Tori Bedells, a native of Clinton, Mississippi, a graduate of University of Southern Mississippi Nursing School. They had three children.

== Death ==
Nunnelee underwent brain surgery at University of Texas MD Anderson Cancer Center after the discovery of a mass in his brain in May 2014. He was brought to TIRR Memorial Hermann Hospital and later Johns Hopkins Hospital to undergo chemotherapy and radiation and receive therapy to restore his speech and mobility on the left side of his body.

Nunnelee died at his home in Tupelo on February 6, 2015, aged 56. President Barack Obama, in an official statement from the White House Press Office, stated: "Michelle and I were saddened to learn of the passing of Representative Alan Nunnelee. Alan represented the people of his beloved Mississippi for two decades, first as a state senator and then in Congress. A proud son of Tupelo, Alan never wavered in his determination to serve the men and women who placed their trust in him, even as he bravely battled the illness that ultimately took his life. As a Sunday School teacher and a deacon at his church, Alan believed deeply in the power of faith and the strength of American families. Today, our thoughts and prayers are with Alan's family – his wife Tori, their children and grandchildren, and all those who loved him."

The funeral services were held on February 9 in Calvary Baptist Church, Tupelo, Mississippi.

== See also ==
- List of members of the United States Congress who died in office (2000–present)#2010s

U.S. House of Representatives
Preceded by Travis Childers	Member of the U.S. House of Representatives from Mississippi's 1st congressional district 2011–2015	Succeeded by Trent Kelly
