= Gene Taylor (Mississippi politician) =

American politician (born 1953)

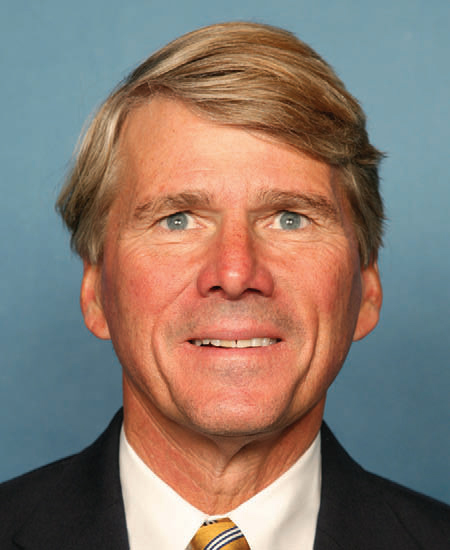

Member of the U.S. House of Representatives from Mississippi
- In office October 17, 1989 – January 3, 2011 (Note: Taylor's official service begins on the date of the special election, while he was not sworn in until October 24, 1989.)
- Preceded by: Larkin Smith
- Succeeded by: Steven Palazzo
- Constituency: 5th district (1989–2003); 4th district (2003–2011)

Member of the Mississippi State Senate from the 46th district
- In office 1984–1989
- Preceded by: District created
- Succeeded by: Vic Franckiewicz Jr.

Personal details
- Born: Gary Eugene Taylor; September 17, 1953 (age 73) New Orleans, Louisiana, U.S.
- Party: Democratic (before 2014); Republican (2014–present)
- Spouse: Margaret Gordon
- Children: 3
- Education: Tulane University (BA); University of Southern Mississippi

Military service
- Branch/service: United States Coast Guard
- Years of service: 1971–1984
- Unit: United States Coast Guard Reserve

Gary Eugene Taylor (born September 17, 1953) is an American politician who was a member of the United States House of Representatives from 1989 to 2011 and previously a member of the Mississippi State Senate from 1983 to 1989. He was defeated for re-election in 2010 by State Representative Steven Palazzo. In 2014, he changed his long-time membership from the Democratic Party, becoming a Republican. The same year, he ran for election against Palazzo to return to the House of Representatives. Securing only 43 percent of the vote, Taylor lost in the primary.

Following his congressional career, Taylor served on the Hancock County Port and Harbor Commission until 2014. He consulted for the defense industry before becoming a director for Overseas Shipholding Group in 2018.

== Early life, education and career ==
Taylor was born in New Orleans on September 17, 1953. He attended De La Salle High School, graduating in 1971. He graduated from Tulane University in 1976 where he majored in political science and history. He completed additional post-graduate work in business and economics at the University of Southern Mississippi from 1978 through 1980.

Taylor worked as a sales representative for Stone Container Corporation, working a territory from New Orleans to the Florida panhandle, from 1977 through 1989.

From 1971 through 1984, Taylor served in the United States Coast Guard Reserve, where he attained the rank petty officer first class. While in the coast guard, he commanded a search and rescue boat and earned several commendations.

== Early political career ==
Taylor was elected to the Bay St. Louis City Council in 1981, and then to a newly created vacant seat in the Mississippi State Senate in 1983. As a State Senator, Taylor and fellow Senator Steven Hale filed a lawsuit challenging the Senate powers of Democratic Lieutenant Governor Brad Dye. Taylor and Hale claimed that Dye's control of committee appointments violated the state constitution's separation of powers. The Supreme Court of Mississippi sided with Dye, but the suit against a powerful leader from his own party helped establish Taylor's reputation for political independence.

== U.S. House of Representatives ==
=== Tenure ===
Taylor was a member of the Blue Dog Coalition, and his voting record was one of the most conservative among Democrats in the House. According to a 2011 survey by the National Journal, Taylor was the most conservative Democrat in the House.

He represented a district that had turned almost solidly Republican at the national level, though as late as 2010 most local offices were split between the two parties. The 4th has not supported the official Democratic presidential candidate since 1956 (when the Democrats nominated Adlai Stevenson). During Taylor's final term, it was the most Republican district in the nation to be represented by a Democrat, with a Cook Partisan Voting Index of R+20. In 2000, 2004, and 2008, it gave the Republican presidential candidate his best total in the state. It was a foregone conclusion that Taylor would be succeeded by a Republican once he retired.

A leading Democratic Member of the House Armed Services Committee, Taylor led committee and floor fights to improve the medical benefits of military retirees and extend TRICARE health insurance to members of the National Guard and Reserves. Taylor also focused on U.S. policy in Latin America, sponsoring the successful cap on the number of U.S. troops that can be sent to Colombia without explicit Congressional authorization. Taylor also was a leading critic of the Base Realignment and Closure process, accusing the Department of Defense of smuggling in policy changes that were unrelated to excess capacity or facilities. Taylor served as the Ranking Democrat on the Projection Forces Subcommittee in the 109th Congress, and became chairman of the renamed Subcommittee on Seapower and Expeditionary Forces in the 110th Congress. He and the previous subcommittee chairman Roscoe Bartlett (R-MD), who became the ranking member of the subcommittee, advocate for more nuclear-powered surface ships in order to reduce the Navy's dependence on imported oil. Taylor was also a member of the Readiness subcommittee of the Armed Services committee in the 110th Congress.

In House Armed Services Committee hearings, Taylor was sharply critical of Secretary of Defense Donald Rumsfeld and other administration witnesses, particularly regarding shortages of armor for troops and vehicles in Iraq. He decried the lack of urgency to speed up production and procurement of armored vehicles and jammers to block the signals of improvised explosive devices (IEDs).

He voted for all four articles of impeachment against Bill Clinton in 1998—the only Democrat in Congress to do so. He was one of just five Democrats to support at least one article of impeachment. He refused to endorse Clinton's reelection bid in 1996, but refused to switch parties despite numerous overtures from the Republicans. In the 2004 Democratic primaries, Taylor endorsed Wesley Clark. He voted for John McCain in 2008. The Christian Coalition gave Taylor an overall rating of 76% and he has endorsed the Federal Marriage Amendment.

Taylor was a strong critic of the Bush Administration's fiscal policy. He voted against the tax cuts passed in 2001 and 2003, claiming that the cuts contained in those bills would only increase the national debt. He derided the prescription drug plan passed in 2003 as a giveaway to companies that donate to the Republican Party. He was one of the House's most vehement opponents of free trade agreements and was strongly opposed to the Bush administration's proposals for reforming Social Security. He also voted at times with more liberal members of the House with regards to Cuba. Since coming to the House, he voted in favor of most campaign finance laws and other laws favored by more progressive elements of the Democratic Party to reform politics.

Taylor was a staunch and consistent opponent of most free trade agreements. He voted against NAFTA and GATT. He voted against fast-track authority in 1998 and 2002. He also opposed Permanent Normal Trade Relations (PNTR) with China in 2000.

Taylor has a mixed voting record on environmental issues; he has voted repeatedly against the ban on drilling in Alaska National Wildlife Refuge (ANWR), while voting at other times with the mainstream of his party. He has also denounced Vice President Dick Cheney's ties to Halliburton.

In 2006, Taylor was the only Democrat to support all four amendments to the bill to renew the Voting Rights Act. However, Taylor did vote in favor of final passage of the unamended bill, as did all House Democrats.

Taylor has been a staunch advocate of maintaining the "Buy American" requirements in Defense contracting, and of maintaining the Jones Act requirements that vessels operating between U.S. ports must be American-flagged, American-made, owned by U.S. citizens, and crewed by U.S. citizens. In February 2007, he was one of two Democrats to oppose H CON RES 63, which expressed opposition to a troop surge in the Iraq War.

Much of Taylor's district took a direct hit from Hurricane Katrina, which destroyed his home in Bay St. Louis (27 miles west of Biloxi) as well as Lott's home in Pascagoula. He moved to Kiln while he rebuilt his home in Bay St. Louis.

When former Federal Emergency Management Agency (FEMA) director Michael D. Brown appeared before the committee, Taylor reacted angrily to Brown's attempts to put primary responsibility for the failed response at the state and local level. Taylor seemed particularly upset that several first responders in Hancock County, his home county, were forced to loot a Wal-Mart to get food and supplies. They also had to wait several days after the storm before they got any help from FEMA workers. He told Brown that FEMA "fell on (its) face" in its response to Katrina, which he said rated "an F-minus in my book."

In April 2009, Taylor voted against the Matthew Shepard and James Byrd, Jr. Hate Crimes Prevention Act.

=== Committee assignments ===
- Committee on Armed Services
  - Subcommittee on Readiness
  - Subcommittee on Seapower and Expeditionary Forces (Chair)
- Committee on Transportation and Infrastructure
  - Subcommittee on Coast Guard and Maritime Transportation
  - Subcommittee on Water Resources and Environment

=== Caucus memberships ===
- Co-chair of the Coast Guard Caucus
- Co-chair of the National Guard and Reserve Caucus
- Co-chair of the Shipbuilding Caucus

== Political campaigns ==
=== 1988 ===
After one term in the State Senate, Taylor ran as the Democratic candidate to succeed Republican incumbent and House Minority Whip Trent Lott in what was then the 5th District when Lott made a successful run for the Senate. He lost to Harrison County Sheriff Larkin I. Smith by almost 10 points. The Democratic Congressional Campaign Committee offered very little help to Taylor, believing the district to be too heavily Republican. Vice President George H. W. Bush defeated Michael Dukakis by approximately a 70 to 30 margin in the district, and Lott beat Wayne Dowdy by a similar margin in the Senate race. Although about 30,000 Bush and Lott voters split their tickets to vote for Taylor, he could not overcome the Republican tide in the district.

=== 1989 ===
Smith died in a plane crash eight months later. In the special election to fill Smith's seat, Taylor picked up 42 percent of the vote to lead Republican Thomas H. Anderson, Jr. and Democrat Mike Moore in the first round. Some leading Democrats had tried to convince Taylor to stand aside and not seek the position in deference to Moore, who was the state's Attorney General and who was also a Gulf Coast resident, but Taylor doubled Moore's vote total on the first ballot. Two weeks later, Taylor beat Anderson, Lott's Chief of Staff, with 65 percent of the vote. Taylor took office on October 24, 1989.

=== 1990 through 2008 ===
Taylor won a full term in 1990 with 81 percent of the vote against realtor Sheila Smith, the widow of his predecessor in the House. He easily turned back spirited reelection challenges in 1992, 1994 and 1996, taking over 60 percent of the vote each time. However, he was reelected in 1998 with 77 percent of the vote and was reelected five more times after that by an average of 70 percent of the vote. His district was renumbered the 4th after the 2000 redistricting cost Mississippi a congressional seat.

=== 2010 ===
Taylor was defeated by Republican state representative Steven Palazzo on November 2, 2010. His vote against Barack Obama for president in 2008 became a campaign issue when Taylor released campaign ads pointing to his support of McCain as evidence of his bipartisanship. However, Palazzo attacked Taylor for supporting Pelosi as Speaker and claimed Taylor voted with his party's leadership 82 percent of the time. Taylor was endorsed by the National Right to Life Committee.

In the following lame duck session of Congress, Taylor dropped his opposition to the Navy's plan to buy both classes of Littoral combat ship, even though this greatly reduced the chances that a shipyard in his former district would then be able to bid for follow on contracts.

Proving just how Republican this district had become, no Democrat running in the district has cleared the 40 percent mark since Taylor left office, and only one has even cleared 30 percent.

=== 2014 ===
Taylor opposed Palazzo in the Republican primary in the June 2014 election. Taylor was seeking to become the first Mississippi U.S. Representative since 1884 to return to the House of Representatives after losing reelection. In an op-ed that ran in The Sun-Herald, the largest newspaper in the district, Taylor said that when he began seriously considering a bid for his own seat, he never even considered running as a Democrat because he had always considered himself a conservative, and the Democrats' turn to the left made him realize that "my views and vision naturally fit in the Republican Party."

Taylor, who was out-raised by Palazzo by almost 6-to-1 and out-spent by over 10-to-1, ran a grassroots campaign, emphasizing his work to secure funding for the district in the wake of Hurricane Katrina and his efforts to support veterans and funding for military bases in the district. He contrasted this with Palazzo's vote against funding for Hurricane Sandy relief efforts and supporting sequestration which cut the defense budget. Taylor lost the primary, securing 43% of the vote to Palazzo's 50.5%, coming a few thousand votes short of forcing Palazzo into a runoff.

== Post-congressional career ==
Taylor was appointed to the Hancock County Port and Harbor Commission by District 3 Supervisor Lisa Cowand in March 2012 and served on the commission until 2014; he provided oversight for Stennis International Airport and Port Bienville Industrial Park. From September 2011 to December 2013, Taylor was a consultant at Navistar Defense, a defense firm.

Taylor has worked as a director for Overseas Shipholding Group since 2018.

== Personal life ==
Taylor and his wife Margaret have three children. He holds a black belt in Taekwondo. Taylor is Roman Catholic.

U.S. House of Representatives
Preceded by Larkin I. Smith	Member of the U.S. House of Representatives from Mississippi's 5th congressional district 1989–2003	Constituency abolished
Preceded by Ronnie Shows	Member of the U.S. House of Representatives from Mississippi's 4th congressional district 2003–2011	Succeeded by Steven Palazzo
U.S. order of precedence (ceremonial)
Preceded by Bob Livingston as Former U.S. Representative	Order of precedence of the United States as Former U.S. Representative	Succeeded by Bill Lipinski as Former U.S. Representative
