= 2023 Mississippi lieutenant gubernatorial election =

- November 7, 2023
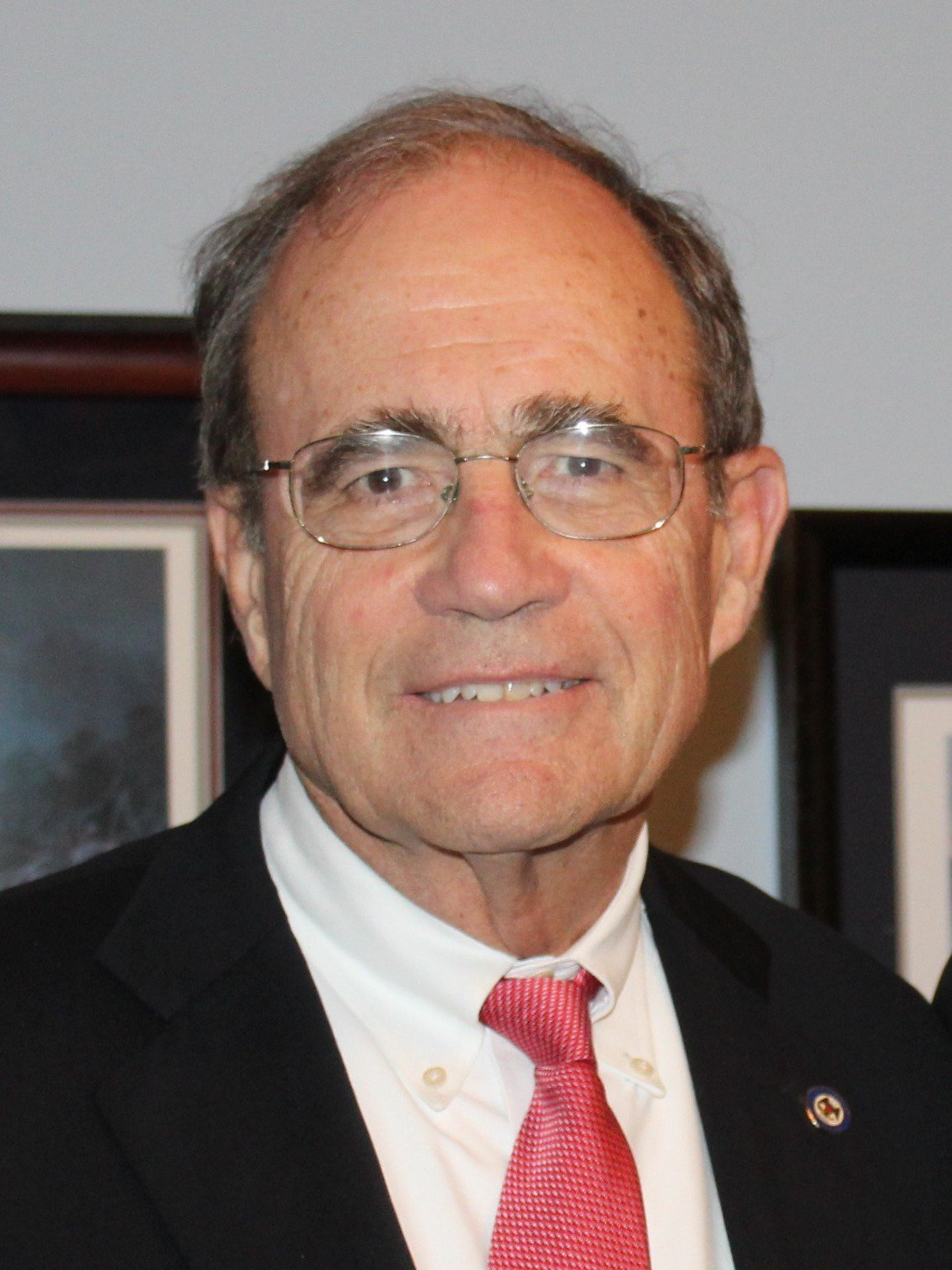

Nominee	Delbert Hosemann	Ryan Grover
Party	Republican	Democratic
Popular vote	490,956	317,347
Percentage	60.74%	39.26%
- Hosemann: 50–60% 60–70% 70–80% 80–90% >90% Grover: 50–60% 60–70% 70–80% 80–90% >90% Tie: 50% No data
Lieutenant Governor before election
Delbert Hosemann
Republican
Elected Lieutenant Governor
Delbert Hosemann
Republican

The 2023 Mississippi lieutenant gubernatorial election took place on November 7, 2023, to elect the lieutenant governor of Mississippi. Incumbent Republican Lieutenant Governor Delbert Hosemann won re-election to a second term in office, significantly outperforming Republican Governor Tate Reeves in the concurrent gubernatorial election.

Hosemann faced a competitive primary challenge from far-right state senator Chris McDaniel but ultimately defeated him in the August 8 primary. Marketing executive Ryan Grover was the only Democrat who filed to run.

== Republican primary ==
Delbert Hosemann entered in the primary as the incumbent Lieuteant Governor. He drew a primary challenge from state senator Chris McDaniel, a far-right lawmaker who nearly unseated U.S. Senator Thad Cochran in his 2014 primary. McDaniel accused Hosemann of being a "liberal" and criticized him for allowing Democrats to chair committees in the state senate, labeling him "Delbert 'the Democrat' Hosemann." In response, Hosemann defended his conservative credentials and called McDaniel "the least effective politician in the state with the largest ego."

Throughout the campaign, McDaniel tied Hosemann to the South Jackson Women's Clinic, in attempts to attack Hosemann's record on the issue of abortion. However, the physician who runs the clinic clarified that Hosemann provided periodic legal services from 1977 to 1981, which was before the clinic began performing abortions. In response, Hosemann called McDaniel a "pathological liar" and accused him of defamation.

Hosemann accused McDaniel of not living in the district where he votes, saying that "it appears doubtful that he lived in his district, which means he voted illegally." McDaniel claimed that the allegations are "just [Hosemann] being desperate." Hosemann also claimed that McDaniel had violated campaign finance and ethics laws. Days before the election, Attorney General Lynn Fitch said she would investigate a PAC run by McDaniel's campaign treasurer, who has a track record of violating Federal Election Commission rules. Despite the allegations, Hosemann consistently out-raised McDaniel throughout the campaign.

Governor Tate Reeves declined to endorse in the Republican primary for Lieutenant Governor, however, he provided a tacit endorsement of McDaniel by implying to reporters that there is only one "conservative candidate running." Mississippi Republican Party chairman Frank Bordeaux reportedly got involved behind the scenes to quell any tensions between Hosemann and Reeves. Hosemann was endorsed by both Mississippi U.S. Senators, Roger Wicker and Cindy Hyde-Smith, while Texas U.S. Senator Ted Cruz backed McDaniel.

On August 8, Hosemann defeated McDaniel, securing 52% of the vote to his 43%. Following his election victory, Hosemann said he would pursue campaign finance reform.

=== Candidates ===
==== Nominee ====
- Delbert Hosemann, incumbent lieutenant governor

==== Eliminated in primary ====
- Tiffany Longino, college professor
- Chris McDaniel, state senator and candidate for U.S. Senate in 2014 and 2018

==== Withdrawn ====
- Shane Quick, music promoter and candidate for lieutenant governor in 2019

=== Endorsements ===
Delbert Hosemann

U.S. Senators

- Cindy Hyde-Smith, U.S. Senator from Mississippi (2018–present)
- Roger Wicker, U.S. Senator from Mississippi (2007–present)

State legislators

- Jeremy England, state senator from the 51st district (2020–present)

Organizations

- Mississippi Association of Realtors
- National Right to Life Committee
- Mississippi Association of Manufacturers
- National Federation of Independent Business
Chris McDaniel

U.S. Senators

- Ted Cruz, U.S. Senator from Texas (2013–present)

State legislators

- Melanie Sojourner, state senator from the 37th district (2012–2016, 2020–present)

Local officials

- Mary Hawkins Butler, mayor of Madison (1981–present)

Organizations

- Conservative Political Action Committee
- Mississippi Fraternal Order of the Police
Declined to endorse

Statewide officials

- Tate Reeves, Governor of Mississippi (2020–present)

=== Fundraising ===
Primary campaign finance activity as of June 9, 2023
Candidate	Raised	Spent	Cash on hand
Delbert Hosemann	$2,500,307	$1,363,092	$3,704,915
Chris McDaniel	$785,135	$646,604	$386,490

=== Polling ===
Poll source	Date(s) administered	Sample size (Note: Key: A – all adults RV – registered voters LV – likely voters V – unclear)	Margin of error	Delbert Hosemann	Tiffany Longino	Chris McDaniel	Shane Quick	Undecided
Mississippi Today/Siena College	June 4–7, 2023	646 (LV)	± 4.8%	47%	—	32%	—	21%
American Strategies (Note: This poll was sponsored by the National Apartment Association and the National Association of Realtors; the Mississippi branch of the latter group has endorsed Hosemann. The poll was never officially released, and was instead leaked by the Magnolia Tribune in June 2023.)	May 22–24, 2023	646 (LV)	± 3.9%	40%	1%	45%	1%	13%

=== Results ===
Results by county: Hosemann: 70–80%; 60–70%; 50–60%; 40–50%; McDaniel: 40–50%; 50–60%; 60–70%; 70–80%

Republican primary results
Party	Candidate	Votes	%
Republican	Delbert Hosemann (incumbent)	198,979	52.11%
Republican	Chris McDaniel	162,708	42.61%
Republican	Tiffany Longino	20,143	5.28%
Total votes		381,830	100.00%

== Democratic primary ==
=== Candidates ===
- D. Ryan Grover, marketing consultant and graphic designer

=== Results ===
Democratic primary results
Party	Candidate	Votes	%
Democratic	D. Ryan Grover	151,793	100.00%
Total votes		151,793	100.00%

== General election ==
=== Endorsements ===
Delbert Hosemann (R)

U.S. Senators

- Cindy Hyde-Smith, U.S. Senator from Mississippi (2018–present)
- Roger Wicker, U.S. Senator from Mississippi (2007–present)

State legislators

- Jeremy England, state senator from the 51st district (2020–present)

Organizations

- Mississippi Association of Realtors
- National Right to Life Committee
- Mississippi Association of Manufacturers

=== Results ===
2023 Mississippi lieutenant gubernatorial election
Party	Candidate	Votes	%	±%
Republican	Delbert Hosemann (incumbent)	490,956	60.74%	+0.73%
Democratic	Ryan Grover	317,347	39.26%	–0.73%
Total votes		808,303	100.00%	N/A
Republican hold				

==== By county ====
County	Delbert Hosemann Republican		Ryan Grover Democratic		Margin		Total
County	#	%	#	%	#	%	Total
Adams	4,101	44.52%	5,111	55.48%	-1,010	-10.96%	9,212
Alcorn	6,822	82.30%	1,467	17.70%	5,355	64.60%	8,289
Amite	3,102	62.21%	1,884	37.79%	1,218	24.43%	4,986
Attala	3,599	61.54%	2,249	38.46%	1,350	23.08%	5,848
Benton	1,742	62.82%	1,031	37.18%	711	25.64%	2,773
Bolivar	2,929	36.46%	5,104	63.54%	-2,175	-27.08%	8,033
Calhoun	3,291	73.69%	1,175	26.31%	2,116	47.38%	4,466
Carroll	2,541	67.98%	1,197	32.02%	1,344	35.96%	3,738
Chickasaw	3,053	54.93%	2,505	45.07%	548	9.86%	5,558
Choctaw	1,998	72.37%	763	27.63%	1,235	44.73%	2,761
Claiborne	794	26.15%	2,242	73.85%	-1,448	-47.69%	3,036
Clarke	3,872	66.00%	1,995	34.00%	1,877	31.99%	5,867
Clay	3,173	45.16%	3,853	54.84%	-680	-9.68%	7,026
Coahoma	1,570	30.96%	3,501	69.04%	-1,931	-38.08%	5,071
Copiah	4,887	52.87%	4,357	47.13%	530	5.73%	9,244
Covington	3,936	63.41%	2,271	36.59%	1,665	26.82%	6,207
DeSoto	22,852	62.49%	13,719	37.51%	9,133	24.97%	36,571
Forrest	11,023	60.46%	7,208	39.54%	3,815	20.93%	18,231
Franklin	2,011	64.50%	1,107	35.50%	904	28.99%	3,118
George	4,095	87.46%	587	12.54%	3,508	74.93%	4,682
Greene	2,713	79.00%	721	21.00%	1,992	58.01%	3,434
Grenada	4,345	54.99%	3,557	45.01%	788	9.97%	7,902
Hancock	8,173	78.30%	2,265	21.70%	5,908	56.60%	10,438
Harrison	28,069	65.95%	14,495	34.05%	13,574	31.89%	42,564
Hinds	24,928	36.95%	42,542	63.05%	-17,614	-26.11%	67,470
Holmes	1,519	26.57%	4,199	73.43%	-2,680	-46.87%	5,718
Humphreys	999	33.44%	1,988	66.56%	-989	-33.11%	2,987
Issaquena	228	53.77%	196	46.23%	32	7.55%	424
Itawamba	6,067	88.63%	778	11.37%	5,289	77.27%	6,845
Jackson	19,970	70.74%	8,259	29.26%	11,711	41.49%	28,229
Jasper	2,866	48.94%	2,990	51.06%	-124	-2.12%	5,856
Jefferson	614	23.02%	2,053	76.98%	-1,439	-53.96%	2,667
Jefferson Davis	1,799	42.69%	2,415	57.31%	-616	-14.62%	4,214
Jones	13,985	70.82%	5,761	29.18%	8,224	41.65%	19,746
Kemper	1,574	43.15%	2,074	56.85%	-500	-13.71%	3,648
Lafayette	9,395	63.74%	5,344	36.26%	4,051	27.48%	14,739
Lamar	12,668	76.49%	3,894	23.51%	8,774	52.98%	16,562
Lauderdale	11,321	63.16%	6,602	36.84%	4,719	26.33%	17,923
Lawrence	2,900	65.58%	1,522	34.42%	1,378	31.16%	4,422
Leake	4,077	62.79%	2,416	37.21%	1,661	25.58%	6,493
Lee	15,984	69.59%	6,984	30.41%	9,000	39.18%	22,968
Leflore	2,308	32.68%	4,755	67.32%	-2,447	-34.65%	7,063
Lincoln	7,923	70.72%	3,281	29.28%	4,642	41.43%	11,204
Lowndes	9,675	55.20%	7,853	44.80%	1,822	10.39%	17,528
Madison	24,493	63.65%	13,990	36.35%	10,503	27.29%	38,483
Marion	4,901	66.94%	2,421	33.06%	2,480	33.87%	7,322
Marshall	4,568	51.60%	4,285	48.40%	283	3.20%	8,853
Monroe	7,266	64.83%	3,941	35.17%	3,325	29.67%	11,207
Montgomery	1,845	57.64%	1,356	42.36%	489	15.28%	3,201
Neshoba	5,027	73.73%	1,791	26.27%	3,236	47.46%	6,818
Newton	4,353	69.67%	1,895	30.33%	2,458	39.34%	6,248
Noxubee	931	26.66%	2,561	73.34%	-1,630	-46.68%	3,492
Oktibbeha	6,846	54.45%	5,727	45.55%	1,119	8.90%	12,573
Panola	6,007	53.04%	5,318	46.96%	689	6.08%	11,325
Pearl River	8,856	80.95%	2,084	19.05%	6,772	61.90%	10,940
Perry	2,914	77.38%	852	22.62%	2,062	54.75%	3,766
Pike	5,905	50.30%	5,835	49.70%	70	0.60%	11,740
Pontotoc	7,393	83.03%	1,511	16.97%	5,882	66.06%	8,904
Prentiss	4,924	80.37%	1,203	19.63%	3,721	60.73%	6,127
Quitman	797	36.31%	1,398	63.69%	-601	-27.38%	2,195
Rankin	32,770	75.14%	10,843	24.86%	21,927	50.28%	43,613
Scott	4,694	59.80%	3,156	40.20%	1,538	19.59%	7,850
Sharkey	547	36.59%	948	63.41%	-401	-26.82%	1,495
Simpson	4,983	66.36%	2,526	33.64%	2,457	32.72%	7,509
Smith	3,760	77.13%	1,115	22.87%	2,645	54.26%	4,875
Stone	3,922	77.34%	1,149	22.66%	2,773	54.68%	5,071
Sunflower	1,868	31.52%	4,058	68.48%	-2,190	-36.96%	5,926
Tallahatchie	1,713	44.93%	2,100	55.07%	-387	-10.15%	3,813
Tate	5,658	66.46%	2,856	33.54%	2,802	32.91%	8,514
Tippah	4,522	80.88%	1,069	19.12%	3,453	61.76%	5,591
Tishomingo	4,849	86.05%	786	13.95%	4,063	72.10%	5,635
Tunica	627	31.30%	1,376	68.70%	-749	-37.39%	2,003
Union	6,256	84.23%	1,171	15.77%	5,085	68.47%	7,427
Walthall	3,010	59.78%	2,025	40.22%	985	19.56%	5,035
Warren	7,828	58.63%	5,523	41.37%	2,305	17.26%	13,351
Washington	3,205	31.53%	6,959	68.47%	-3,754	-36.93%	10,164
Wayne	4,666	62.60%	2,788	37.40%	1,878	25.19%	7,454
Webster	2,721	79.75%	691	20.25%	2,030	59.50%	3,412
Wilkinson	1,039	35.21%	1,912	64.79%	-873	-29.58%	2,951
Winston	3,627	56.97%	2,740	43.03%	887	13.93%	6,367
Yalobusha	2,544	58.89%	1,776	41.11%	768	17.78%	4,320
Yazoo	3,630	52.07%	3,342	47.93%	288	4.13%	6,972
Totals	490,956	60.74%	317,347	39.26%	173,609	21.48%	808,303

Counties that flipped from Democratic to Republican

- Lafayette (largest city: Oxford)

==== By congressional district ====
Hosemann won three of four congressional districts.

District	Hosemann	Grover	Representative
1st	68%	32%	Trent Kelly
2nd	42%	58%	Bennie Thompson
3rd	65%	35%	Michael Guest
4th	71%	29%	Mike Ezell

== Notes ==
Partisan clients
