= Chris McDaniel =

American politician (born 1971)

- McDaniel in 2019

Member of the Mississippi Senate from the 42nd district
- In office January 8, 2008 – January 2, 2024
- Preceded by: Stacey Pickering
- Succeeded by: Robin Robinson

Personal details
- Born: Christopher Brian McDaniel; June 28, 1971 (age 55) Laurel, Mississippi, U.S.
- Party: Republican
- Spouse: Jill Tullos
- Children: 2
- Relatives: Luke McDaniel (grandfather)
- Education: Jones County Junior College (AA); William Carey University (BS); University of Mississippi (JD)

Christopher Brian McDaniel (born June 28, 1971) is an American attorney, talk radio host, and politician who served in the Mississippi State Senate from 2008 to 2024. His politics have been characterized as far-right, a label which he rejects. He has been described as the leader of the rightmost faction of the Mississippi Republican Party, believing "the government is the big, bad enemy of working people, and it should be completely stripped of its size and might so that citizens may take full control of their lives."

A member of the Republican Party, McDaniel gained national attention for his Tea Party-backed 2014 Republican primary challenge to incumbent U.S. Senator Thad Cochran. After neither candidate received a majority in a hard-fought primary, Cochran narrowly defeated McDaniel in the runoff election. McDaniel ran for the U.S. Senate again in 2018, winning 16.4% of the vote in the nonpartisan, four-candidate primary. McDaniel then ran for Lieutenant Governor of Mississippi, unsuccessfully challenging incumbent Delbert Hosemann.

== Early life and education ==
McDaniel was born in Laurel, Mississippi. He is the only child of Carlos and Charlotte McDaniel, and the grandson of Luke McDaniel, a country and rockabilly singer. He graduated with honors from Jones County Junior College and received a B.S. with honors from William Carey University in 1994. He then entered the University of Mississippi School of Law, graduating cum laude in 1997 with a Juris Doctor degree. McDaniel resides with his family in Ellisville, Mississippi.

== Legal career ==
In 1997, McDaniel entered a two-year federal clerkship with United States District Court Judge Charles W. Pickering. After leaving that position, he joined the law firm Hortman Harlow Bassi Robinson & McDaniel, becoming a partner in 2003. His areas of concentration include litigation, insurance defense, corporate law, products liability, commercial litigation, consumer products litigation, mass tort litigation, complex multi-party litigation, legislation, Constitutional law, and civil rights. He is licensed to practice law in Mississippi, Texas and Arkansas. In 2010, he was named one of the top 50 lawyers in Mississippi by the Mississippi Business Journal. He was acknowledged by Memphis Magazine, naming him a Rising Star and a Top Young Lawyer from 2008 to 2012. He was selected as a national Super Lawyer in 2024 and 2025, an honor received by only five percent of attorneys nationwide. Further cementing his professional stature, he was distinguished as a national Lawyer of Distinction, an honor that recognizes excellence in practice.

McDaniel has been recognized with the AV Preeminent® Rating by Martindale-Hubbell, the highest distinction for legal excellence, awarded based on peer reviews by members of the bar and judiciary. This rating reflects his superior legal knowledge, analytical capabilities, judgment, communication skills, and ethical standards. Additionally, he has earned the Client Champion Platinum Award, which recognizes his exceptional dedication to client service, communication, and delivering outstanding results. These honors reflect both the respect of his peers and the trust and satisfaction of his clients.

Avvo has assigned McDaniel a 9.1 professional rating, categorized as “Superb,” the service’s highest rating category.

== Radio career ==
McDaniel is the former host of The Right Side Radio Show on WMXI 98.1 FM in Hattiesburg, Mississippi, nationally syndicated since 2006 by EBN Radio Network and Golden Broadcasters. The show was broadcast nationwide on ABC Radio Networks and the industry standard Starguide III system. It returned to local stations after McDaniel left the show.

== Political career ==
McDaniel is a Republican who has served in the Mississippi Senate since 2008.

McDaniel was named 2010 Citizen of the Year by the Laurel Leader Call.

In 2012, McDaniel led a delegation to the Alamo Mission in San Antonio, Texas, for the dedication of a monument to the eight Mississippians who died when the fort was overrun in 1836.

McDaniel was honored in 2023 by the Mississippi Senate for his distinguished service, noting that his "service has been marked by his sound judgment, civility, courtesy and fairness. He has set the highest standard in all of his many roles: husband, father, attorney, radio communicator, statesman, community leader, leader in the Mississippi Senate, and as a true friend."

=== 2014 U.S. Senate campaign ===
In 2014, McDaniel ran for the U.S. Senate seat occupied by Thad Cochran.

Although McDaniel was not initially believed to pose a serious threat to Cochran, he proved a formidable challenger. Polling showed the lead swinging between the two and it eventually became a "50%-50% race". McDaniel was vocal about his intention to repeal Obamacare and to work to lower the national debt.

The primary was considered a marquee establishment-versus-Tea Party fight. Cochran's seniority and appropriating skills contrasted with the junior status of the rest of the state's congressional delegation. The primary was called "nasty" and full of "bizarre" twists.

In May 2014, a McDaniel supporter entered the nursing home where Cochran’s bedridden wife was living and photographed her without permission. The images were posted online in connection with allegations that Cochran was having an affair while his wife received nursing-home care. Four people were arrested in connection with the incident. McDaniel condemned the conduct, stating, “As we have said since day one, the violation of the privacy of Mrs. Cochran is out of bounds for politics and is reprehensible. Any individuals who were involved in this crime should be prosecuted to the fullest extent of the law.” He also stated, “Our campaign had absolutely nothing to do with that.” In subsequent litigation, the Mississippi Court of Appeals described those responsible as McDaniel supporters who were “not directly affiliated with his campaign.” Richard Sager, one of those involved, later stated that the campaign “had absolutely nothing to do with it,” explaining, “Basically we went rogue.” John Mary’s attorney, Doug Lee, likewise stated that his client had “no connection with the McDaniel campaign” and said Mary maintained that the four individuals had held “no talks” with the campaign or its staff concerning the incident.

Neither candidate won a majority in the primary election; McDaniel won 49.46% of the vote to Cochran's 49.02%. A runoff election was held on June 24. Despite trailing in most of the polls, Cochran won with 51.01% of the vote to McDaniel's 48.99%.

In the aftermath of the election, the McDaniel campaign claimed there were signs of voter fraud. The campaign asserted that about 3,300 Democrats had voted for Cochran in the runoff. The campaign said it was investigating whether the crossover voting violated Mississippi law. A day after the state party certified the election results, Senator Ted Cruz and some Tea Party groups backed an investigation of alleged voter fraud in the runoff. Cruz also told reporters that groups aligned with Cochran's campaign had run racially charged ads designed to persuade black voters to vote against McDaniel. Of the ads, McDaniel said that the GOP is "a party that does not need to play the race card to win."

In July 2014, the Mississippi Supreme Court rejected McDaniel's request for access to poll books without voters' birthdates blacked out, which his attorneys argued were needed to identify fraudulent votes. In August, a Mississippi judge dismissed McDaniel's challenge. In October, the Mississippi Supreme Court affirmed the lower court's dismissal in a 4–2 decision.

=== 2018 U.S. Senate campaign ===
Chris McDaniel campaign sign, 2018

McDaniel originally declared that he would run against Senator Roger Wicker in the 2018 Republican primary. On March 5, 2018, Thad Cochran announced he would resign effective April 1, 2018, due to health concerns. Republican governor Phil Bryant appointed Cindy Hyde-Smith to fill the vacancy created by Cochran's resignation. A nonpartisan blanket primary to fill the vacancy for the remainder of Cochran's Senate term was scheduled for November 6, 2018. These developments prompted McDaniel to cease his primary challenge to Wicker and instead run in the nonpartisan blanket primary to fill Cochran's vacated seat. McDaniel said, "by announcing early, we are asking Mississippi Republicans to unite around my candidacy and avoid another contentious contest among GOP members that would only improve the Democrats' chances of winning the open seat." He was the second candidate to enter the race. The first, Democrat Mike Espy, declared his candidacy shortly after Cochran announced his resignation. Hyde-Smith later defeated McDaniel in a nonpartisan blanket primary with two Democrats and two Republicans contending for the office; McDaniel received 16.4% of the vote.

=== 2023 lieutenant governor campaign ===
On January 30, 2023, McDaniel announced his candidacy for lieutenant governor of Mississippi in 2023, challenging incumbent Delbert Hosemann in the Republican primary. McDaniel lost this race.

== Political positions ==
McDaniel's political views are generally described as far-right, a label he has rejected. According to McDaniel, the political thinkers that have influenced his views include: Thomas Jefferson, Frédéric Bastiat, Friedrich Hayek, Robert Taft, Russell Kirk, Barry Goldwater, William F. Buckley and Ronald Reagan.

=== Eminent domain ===
As a first-term senator in 2010, McDaniel urged his fellow state senators to override Governor Haley Barbour's veto of eminent domain legislation that would prevent government from taking private land for use by private companies. The override effort failed by two votes, but began a ballot initiative to amend the Mississippi Constitution. The ballot initiative passed the following year.

=== Healthcare ===
In April 2010, McDaniel led a lawsuit seeking to have the Patient Protection and Affordable Care Act (Obamacare) deemed unconstitutional.

=== LGBT rights and women ===
McDaniel has said that the Democratic Party is the party of "sex on demand, the party that supports the homosexual agenda". On January 22, 2017, McDaniel responded on Facebook to the 2017 Women's March by referring to marchers as "a bunch of unhappy liberal women" and stated that he opposes using federal funds to pay for birth control and abortion.

=== Immigration ===
In 2007, McDaniel's immigration policy, as stated on his website, plagiarized text from a number of anti-immigration groups. McDaniel opposes a pathway to citizenship or temporary work permits for undocumented immigrants. He opposes increases in residency permits and work visas.

=== Second Amendment ===
McDaniel supports an expansive interpretation of the Second Amendment and has opposed federal restrictions on firearms. In 2013, he introduced the “Second Amendment Preservation Act” and the “Firearm Protection Act,” which were intended to prevent federal infringement on the right to keep and bear arms. He also introduced legislation that would have prohibited Mississippi and its local governments from assisting in the enforcement of certain federal restrictions on firearms and ammunition. The bills died in committee.

During his 2018 campaign for the United States Senate, McDaniel pledged to defend the Second Amendment and protect gun-ownership rights.

=== Taxes and government spending ===
McDaniel supports reducing taxes and limiting government spending. During his 2023 campaign for lieutenant governor, he identified tax relief as his principal policy priority and advocated eliminating Mississippi's individual income tax and its tax on groceries. He argued that eliminating the taxes would encourage economic growth and that the grocery tax disproportionately affected lower-income residents.

McDaniel has also advocated controlling government expenditures and reducing the size and scope of government.

=== Limited government ===
McDaniel describes individual liberty and limited government as central principles of his political philosophy. He has supported term limits and proposals to reduce the size of the Mississippi Legislature. During his 2023 campaign for lieutenant governor, he presented his candidacy as an effort to defend individual liberty and restrain governmental power.

=== Relationship with the Republican establishment ===
McDaniel has been identified with the Tea Party movement and the anti-establishment wing of the Republican Party. His 2014 campaign against incumbent United States Senator Thad Cochran was widely characterized as a contest between the Tea Party and the Republican establishment.

McDaniel has criticized Republican officials whom he considers insufficiently conservative and has portrayed his campaigns as challenges to entrenched political leadership and institutional power within the party.

=== Race and criminal justice ===
McDaniel has said that public policy should treat people as individuals rather than as members of racial groups. In a 2018 interview with the Jackson Free Press, he stated, “I don't see race. I see souls,” and said that all people should be treated with dignity and respect. He argued that political parties and government institutions often deepen racial divisions by categorizing people according to race and other collective identities.

McDaniel has rejected the characterization of racial disparities in the criminal-justice system as evidence of systemic inequality, attributing discrimination principally to the conduct of individuals rather than to the system as a whole. He has nevertheless acknowledged disparities in incarceration and has supported criminal-justice reforms intended to reduce the criminalization and long-term incarceration of nonviolent offenders and to provide opportunities for rehabilitation.

McDaniel has expressed support for law enforcement while also stating that constitutional due-process protections and the dignity and individual rights of people involved in police encounters must be protected.

=== Views on sexual assault ===
In a September 2018 appearance on American Family Radio, in reference to the allegation of sexual assault against U.S. Supreme Court nominee Brett Kavanaugh, McDaniel contended that sexual assault allegations "99 percent of the time are just absolutely fabricated." No research supports this claim. The McDaniel campaign argued the quote was taken out of context, claiming the attacks against Kavanaugh were politically motivated in nature.

=== Southern secessionism and the Confederacy ===
In his 2018 Senate campaign, McDaniel promised to preserve Mississippians' right to decide the flag of Mississippi, which at that time bore an image of the Confederate battle flag. This former flag features in McDaniel's campaign materials. McDaniel has spoken at conferences held by the Sons of Confederate Veterans. In 2006–2007, he made controversial statements on reparations for slavery, race, and women on his talk radio show.

In August 2017, McDaniel claimed on his Twitter account that Robert E. Lee, commander of the Confederate States Army, was opposed to slavery. (Lee accepted "the extinction of slavery" provided for by the Thirteenth Amendment, but believed slavery was good for black people, publicly opposed racial equality, and opposed granting African Americans the right to vote and other political rights.) McDaniel later defended his views on Lee in a Facebook post that was discovered to have been plagiarized from Dinesh D'Souza.

The website for McDaniel's broadcast show "The Right Side Radio Show" listed the website of the League of the South—a secessionist "Southern Nationalist" organization—as one of the show's favorite websites. When asked about this in 2018, McDaniel's spokesperson said McDaniel "has never endorsed the League of the South and has nothing to do with them."

== Personal life ==
McDaniel is married to Jill Tullos McDaniel, who was the 1995 Miss Mississippi USA. They have two children. McDaniel is a Southern Baptist.

== Electoral history ==
Mississippi's 42nd State Senate district election, 2007

Republican primary results
Party	Candidate	Votes	%
Republican	Chris McDaniel	2,790	77.27%
Republican	Alvis Jeffcoat	821	22.73%
Total votes		3,611	100.00%

General election
Party	Candidate	Votes	%
Republican	Chris McDaniel	10,261	60.87%
Democratic	Martin C. "Popcorn" Beech	6,596	39.13%
Total votes		16,857	100.00%
Republican hold			

Mississippi's 42nd State Senate district election, 2011

Republican primary results
Party	Candidate	Votes	%
Republican	Chris McDaniel (incumbent)	11,472	100.00%
Total votes		11,472	100.00%

General election
Party	Candidate	Votes	%
Republican	Chris McDaniel (incumbent)	17,590	100.00%
Total votes		17,590	100.00%
Republican hold			

2014 United States Senate election in Mississippi

Republican primary results
Party	Candidate	Votes	%
Republican	Chris McDaniel	157,733	49.46%
Republican	Thad Cochran (incumbent)	156,315	49.02%
Republican	Thomas Carey	4,854	1.52%
Total votes		318,902	100.00%

Republican primary runoff results
Party	Candidate	Votes	%
Republican	Thad Cochran (incumbent)	194,972	51.01%
Republican	Chris McDaniel	187,249	48.99%
Total votes		382,197	100.00%

Mississippi's 42nd State Senate district election, 2015

Republican primary results
Party	Candidate	Votes	%
Republican	Chris McDaniel (incumbent)	9,983	100.00%
Total votes		9,983	100.00%

General election
Party	Candidate	Votes	%
Republican	Chris McDaniel (incumbent)	12,489	85.81%
Democratic	Johnny Ishmel Henry	2,065	14.19%
Total votes		14,554	100.00%
Republican hold			

2018 United States Senate special election in Mississippi

First round
Party	Candidate	Votes	%
Republican	Cindy Hyde-Smith (incumbent)	389,995	41.25%
Democratic	Mike Espy	386,742	40.90%
Republican	Chris McDaniel	154,878	16.38%
Nonpartisan	Tobey Bartee	13,852	1.47%
Total votes		945,467	100.00%

Mississippi's 42nd state Senate district election, 2019

Republican primary results
Party	Candidate	Votes	%
Republican	Chris McDaniel (incumbent)	10,420	100.00%
Total votes		10,420	100.00%

General election
Party	Candidate	Votes	%
Republican	Chris McDaniel (incumbent)	15,728	100.00%
Total votes		15,728	100.00%
Republican hold			

2023 Mississippi lieutenant gubernatorial election

Republican primary results
Party	Candidate	Votes	%
Republican	Delbert Hosemann (incumbent)	198,979	52.11%
Republican	Chris McDaniel	162,708	42.61%
Republican	Tiffany Longino	20,143	5.28%
Total votes		381,830	100.00%
