= 2025 Southaven mayoral election =

Mississippi election

← 2021	June 3, 2025	2029 →
Candidate	Darren Musselwhite
Party	Republican
Popular vote	Unopposed
Mayor before election
Darren Musselwhite
Republican
Elected mayor
Darren Musselwhite
Republican

The 2025 mayoral election in Southaven, Mississippi took place on June 3, 2025, alongside other Southaven municipal races. Incumbent mayor Darren Musselwhite is eligible for re-election to a fourth four-year term. Primary elections took place on April 1. A run-off would have taken place on April 22 if no candidate received a majority of votes.

== Republican primary ==
=== Candidates ===
==== Qualified ====
- Tommy Henley, small business owner
- Darren Musselwhite, incumbent mayor (2013–present)

=== Results ===
Republican primary results
Party	Candidate	Votes	%
Republican	Darren Musselwhite (incumbent)	1,446	76.00
Republican	Tommy Henley	460	24.00
Total votes		1,906	100.00

== Democratic primary ==
=== Candidates ===
There were no candidates from the Democratic Party in this election.

== General election ==
=== Results ===
2025 Southaven mayoral election
Party	Candidate	Votes	%
Republican	Darren Musselwhite (incumbent)	Unopposed	
Total votes			
