= 2019 Mississippi lieutenant gubernatorial election =

- November 5, 2019
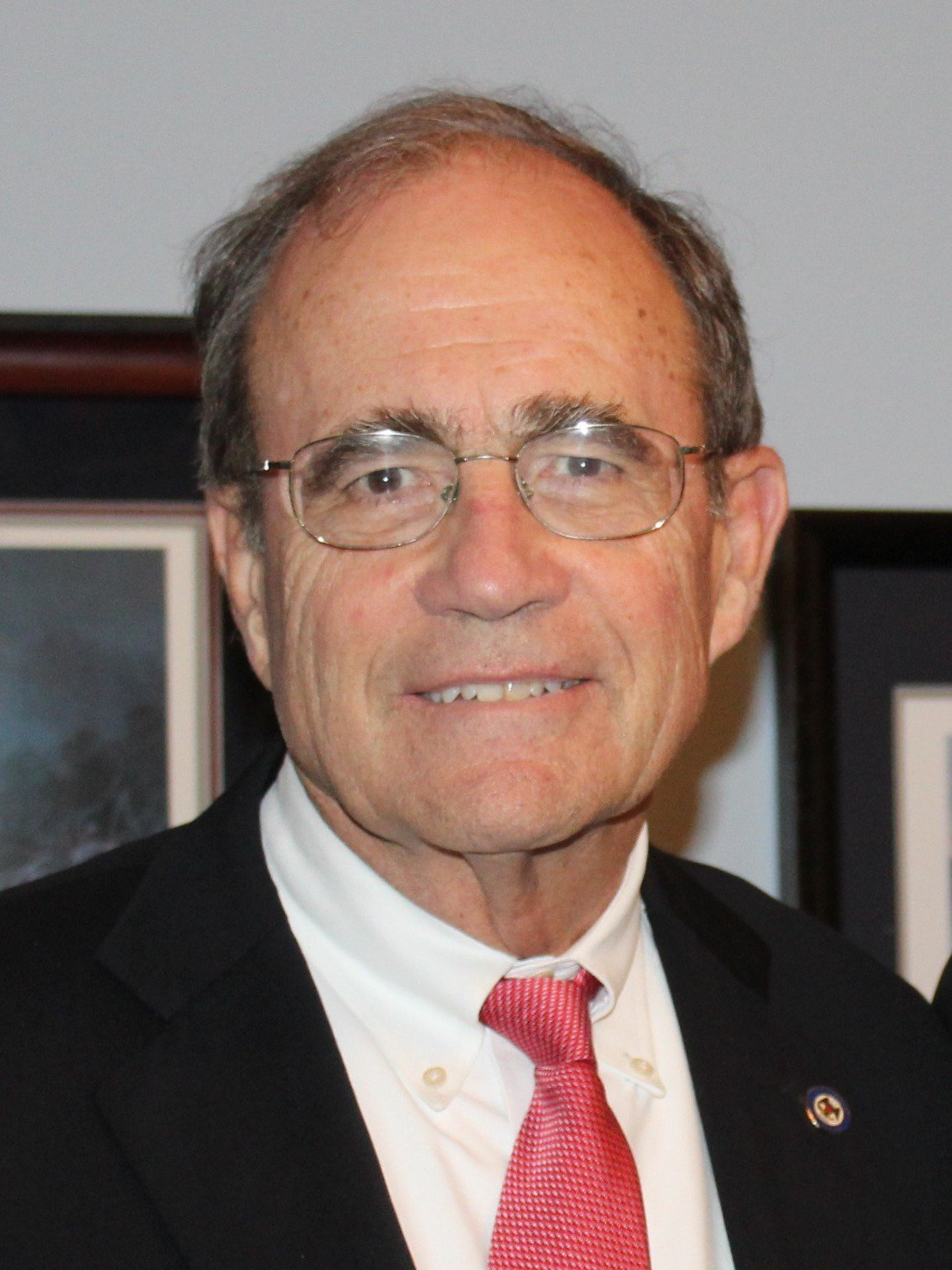

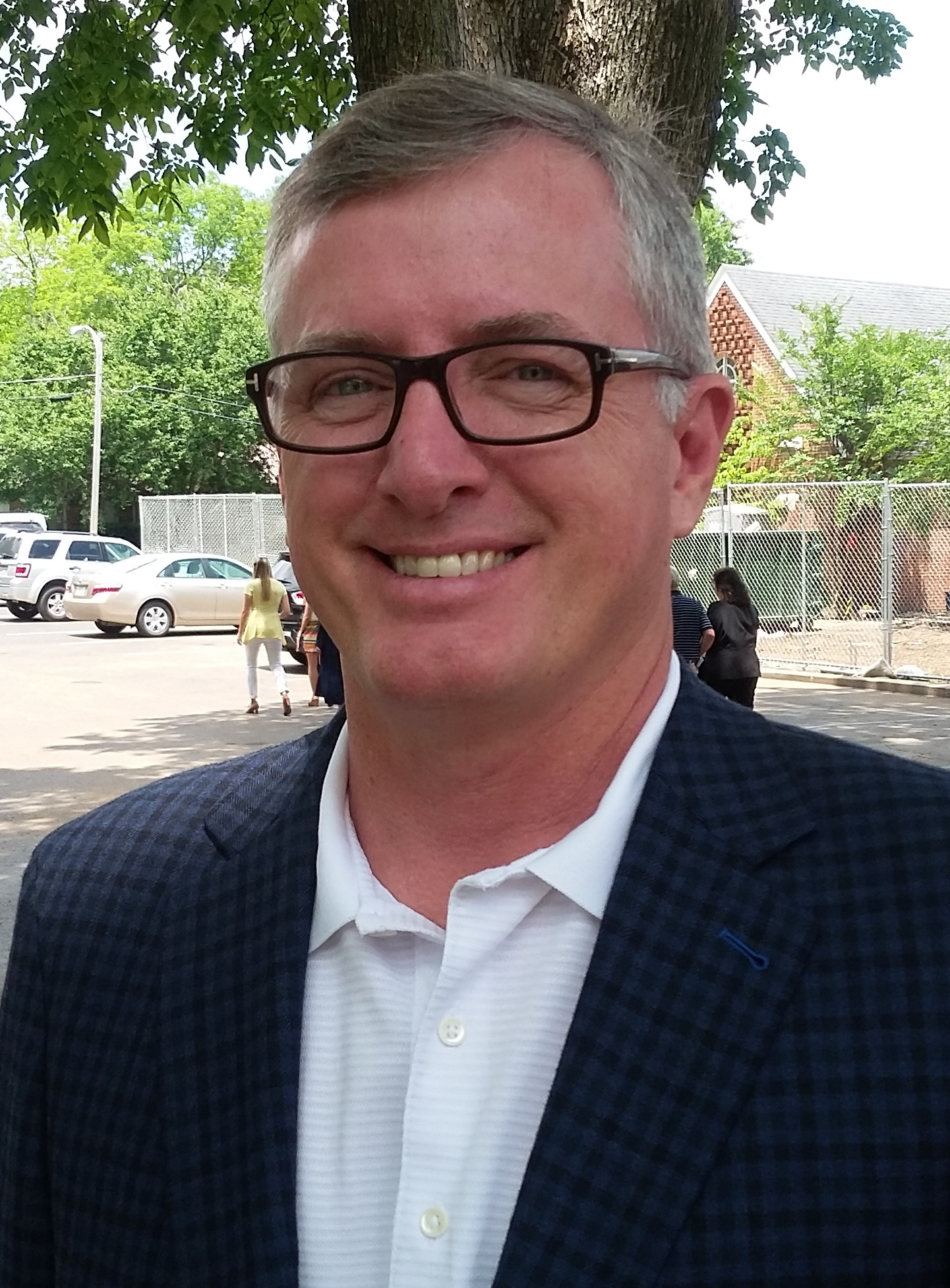
| Nominee | Delbert Hosemann | Jay Hughes |
| Party | Republican | Democratic |
| Electoral vote | 78 | 44 |
| Popular vote | 524,757 | 349,627 |
| Percentage | 60.01% | 39.99% |
- Hosemann: 50–60% 60–70% 70–80% 80–90% Hughes: 50–60% 60–70% 70–80%
Lieutenant Governor before election
Tate Reeves
Republican
Elected Lieutenant Governor
Delbert Hosemann
Republican

The 2019 Mississippi lieutenant gubernatorial election took place on November 5, 2019, to elect the lieutenant governor of Mississippi. Incumbent Republican Lieutenant Governor Tate Reeves was term-limited and ran for governor. Republican Mississippi Secretary of State Delbert Hosemann won the election, defeating Democratic state Representative Jay Hughes in a landslide and significantly outperforming Reeves in the concurrent gubernatorial election.

== Republican primary ==
=== Candidates ===
==== Nominee ====
- Delbert Hosemann, secretary of state of Mississippi (2008–2020)

==== Eliminated in primary ====
- Shane Quick, music promoter

=== Results ===
Republican primary results
| Party | Candidate | Votes | % |
|---|---|---|---|
| Republican | Delbert Hosemann | 311,518 | 85.77% |
| Republican | Shane Quick | 51,703 | 14.23% |
| Total votes | | 363,221 | 100.00% |

== Democratic primary ==
=== Candidates ===
==== Nominee ====
- Jay Hughes, state representative (2016–2020)

=== Results ===
Democratic primary results
| Party | Candidate | Votes | % |
|---|---|---|---|
| Democratic | Jay Hughes | 280,504 | 100.00% |
| Total votes | | 280,504 | 100.00% |

== General election ==
=== Endorsements ===
Delbert Hosemann (R)

Local officials

- George Flaggs Jr., mayor of Vicksburg (2013–2025) (Independent)

=== Results ===
| Candidate | Party | Popular vote | | Electoral vote | |
| Candidate | Party | Votes | % | Votes | % |
|---|---|---|---|---|---|
| Delbert Hosemann | Republican Party | 524,757 | 60.01 | 78 | 63.93 |
| Jay Hughes | Democratic Party | 349,627 | 39.99 | 44 | 36.07 |
| Total | | 874,384 | 100.00 | 122 | 100.00 |
Source: Mississippi Secretary of State

==== By county ====
| County | Delbert Hosemann Republican | | Jay Hughes Democratic | | Margin | | Total |
| County | # | % | # | % | # | % | Total |
|---|---|---|---|---|---|---|---|
| Adams | 4,670 | 44.80% | 5,755 | 55.20% | -1,085 | -10.41% | 10,425 |
| Alcorn | 8,982 | 79.83% | 2,269 | 20.17% | 6,713 | 59.67% | 11,251 |
| Amite | 3,114 | 60.55% | 2,029 | 39.45% | 1,085 | 21.10% | 5,143 |
| Attala | 3,640 | 62.63% | 2,172 | 37.37% | 1,468 | 25.26% | 5,812 |
| Benton | 1,637 | 65.22% | 873 | 34.78% | 764 | 30.44% | 2,510 |
| Bolivar | 3,742 | 38.58% | 5,957 | 61.42% | -2,215 | -22.84% | 9,699 |
| Calhoun | 3,430 | 68.22% | 1,598 | 31.78% | 1,832 | 36.44% | 5,028 |
| Carroll | 2,875 | 70.47% | 1,205 | 29.53% | 1,670 | 40.93% | 4,080 |
| Chickasaw | 3,299 | 52.28% | 3,011 | 47.72% | 288 | 4.56% | 6,310 |
| Choctaw | 2,160 | 71.71% | 852 | 28.29% | 1,308 | 43.43% | 3,012 |
| Claiborne | 852 | 23.73% | 2,738 | 76.27% | -1,886 | -52.53% | 3,590 |
| Clarke | 4,197 | 66.74% | 2,092 | 33.26% | 2,105 | 33.47% | 6,289 |
| Clay | 3,246 | 45.35% | 3,912 | 54.65% | -666 | -9.30% | 7,158 |
| Coahoma | 1,637 | 35.05% | 3,034 | 64.95% | -1,397 | -29.91% | 4,671 |
| Copiah | 4,857 | 51.00% | 4,666 | 49.00% | 191 | 2.01% | 9,523 |
| Covington | 4,567 | 64.31% | 2,534 | 35.69% | 2,033 | 28.63% | 7,101 |
| DeSoto | 24,721 | 67.07% | 12,139 | 32.93% | 12,582 | 34.13% | 36,860 |
| Forrest | 12,619 | 60.99% | 8,070 | 39.01% | 4,549 | 21.99% | 20,689 |
| Franklin | 2,296 | 63.99% | 1,292 | 36.01% | 1,004 | 27.98% | 3,588 |
| George | 4,611 | 85.56% | 778 | 14.44% | 3,833 | 71.13% | 5,389 |
| Greene | 3,010 | 75.02% | 1,002 | 24.98% | 2,008 | 50.05% | 4,012 |
| Grenada | 3,975 | 55.15% | 3,232 | 44.85% | 743 | 10.31% | 7,207 |
| Hancock | 8,858 | 76.00% | 2,797 | 24.00% | 6,061 | 52.00% | 11,655 |
| Harrison | 28,526 | 64.32% | 15,826 | 35.68% | 12,700 | 28.63% | 44,352 |
| Hinds | 24,308 | 33.73% | 47,750 | 66.27% | -23,442 | -32.53% | 72,058 |
| Holmes | 1,651 | 26.72% | 4,528 | 73.28% | -2,877 | -46.56% | 6,179 |
| Humphreys | 971 | 34.47% | 1,846 | 65.53% | -875 | -31.06% | 2,817 |
| Issaquena | 257 | 54.91% | 211 | 45.09% | 46 | 9.83% | 468 |
| Itawamba | 6,477 | 87.08% | 961 | 12.92% | 5,516 | 74.16% | 7,438 |
| Jackson | 22,464 | 69.25% | 9,975 | 30.75% | 12,489 | 38.50% | 32,439 |
| Jasper | 2,896 | 49.20% | 2,990 | 50.80% | -94 | -1.60% | 5,886 |
| Jefferson | 712 | 22.06% | 2,516 | 77.94% | -1,804 | -55.89% | 3,228 |
| Jefferson Davis | 2,030 | 44.70% | 2,511 | 55.30% | -481 | -10.59% | 4,541 |
| Jones | 15,225 | 72.36% | 5,817 | 27.64% | 9,408 | 44.71% | 21,042 |
| Kemper | 1,616 | 40.49% | 2,375 | 59.51% | -759 | -19.02% | 3,991 |
| Lafayette | 7,318 | 47.40% | 8,122 | 52.60% | -804 | -5.21% | 15,440 |
| Lamar | 13,152 | 75.66% | 4,232 | 24.34% | 8,920 | 51.31% | 17,384 |
| Lauderdale | 13,177 | 62.51% | 7,904 | 37.49% | 5,273 | 25.01% | 21,081 |
| Lawrence | 3,374 | 66.57% | 1,694 | 33.43% | 1,680 | 33.15% | 5,068 |
| Leake | 4,113 | 60.29% | 2,709 | 39.71% | 1,404 | 20.58% | 6,822 |
| Lee | 16,959 | 67.63% | 8,117 | 32.37% | 8,842 | 35.26% | 25,076 |
| Leflore | 2,653 | 35.50% | 4,820 | 64.50% | -2,167 | -29.00% | 7,473 |
| Lincoln | 7,994 | 70.67% | 3,317 | 29.33% | 4,677 | 41.35% | 11,311 |
| Lowndes | 9,780 | 55.64% | 7,796 | 44.36% | 1,984 | 11.29% | 17,576 |
| Madison | 24,073 | 61.64% | 14,983 | 38.36% | 9,090 | 23.27% | 39,056 |
| Marion | 5,941 | 67.52% | 2,858 | 32.48% | 3,083 | 35.04% | 8,799 |
| Marshall | 4,453 | 50.76% | 4,320 | 49.24% | 133 | 1.52% | 8,773 |
| Monroe | 7,972 | 65.78% | 4,148 | 34.22% | 3,824 | 31.55% | 12,120 |
| Montgomery | 2,185 | 57.85% | 1,592 | 42.15% | 593 | 15.70% | 3,777 |
| Neshoba | 5,515 | 67.99% | 2,596 | 32.01% | 2,919 | 35.99% | 8,111 |
| Newton | 5,083 | 68.98% | 2,286 | 31.02% | 2,797 | 37.96% | 7,369 |
| Noxubee | 997 | 28.90% | 2,453 | 71.10% | -1,456 | -42.20% | 3,450 |
| Oktibbeha | 6,399 | 50.97% | 6,155 | 49.03% | 244 | 1.94% | 12,554 |
| Panola | 6,053 | 51.32% | 5,741 | 48.68% | 312 | 2.65% | 11,794 |
| Pearl River | 10,516 | 80.24% | 2,589 | 19.76% | 7,927 | 60.49% | 13,105 |
| Perry | 3,270 | 76.22% | 1,020 | 23.78% | 2,250 | 52.45% | 4,290 |
| Pike | 6,705 | 53.12% | 5,917 | 46.88% | 788 | 6.24% | 12,622 |
| Pontotoc | 7,306 | 76.53% | 2,240 | 23.47% | 5,066 | 53.07% | 9,546 |
| Prentiss | 5,857 | 76.49% | 1,800 | 23.51% | 4,057 | 52.98% | 7,657 |
| Quitman | 946 | 36.47% | 1,648 | 63.53% | -702 | -27.06% | 2,594 |
| Rankin | 35,138 | 74.99% | 11,718 | 25.01% | 23,420 | 49.98% | 46,856 |
| Scott | 4,619 | 59.40% | 3,157 | 40.60% | 1,462 | 18.80% | 7,776 |
| Sharkey | 650 | 41.48% | 917 | 58.52% | -267 | -17.04% | 1,567 |
| Simpson | 6,218 | 67.11% | 3,047 | 32.89% | 3,171 | 34.23% | 9,265 |
| Smith | 4,856 | 75.31% | 1,592 | 24.69% | 3,264 | 50.62% | 6,448 |
| Stone | 3,870 | 74.70% | 1,311 | 25.30% | 2,559 | 49.39% | 5,181 |
| Sunflower | 2,122 | 34.03% | 4,113 | 65.97% | -1,991 | -31.93% | 6,235 |
| Tallahatchie | 2,013 | 43.66% | 2,598 | 56.34% | -585 | -12.69% | 4,611 |
| Tate | 5,411 | 66.79% | 2,690 | 33.21% | 2,721 | 33.59% | 8,101 |
| Tippah | 5,645 | 79.52% | 1,454 | 20.48% | 4,191 | 59.04% | 7,099 |
| Tishomingo | 5,596 | 82.45% | 1,191 | 17.55% | 4,405 | 64.90% | 6,787 |
| Tunica | 716 | 32.69% | 1,474 | 67.31% | -758 | -34.61% | 2,190 |
| Union | 7,181 | 79.52% | 1,850 | 20.48% | 5,331 | 59.03% | 9,031 |
| Walthall | 2,928 | 61.99% | 1,795 | 38.01% | 1,133 | 23.99% | 4,723 |
| Warren | 8,441 | 59.51% | 5,742 | 40.49% | 2,699 | 19.03% | 14,183 |
| Washington | 4,047 | 34.43% | 7,708 | 65.57% | -3,661 | -31.14% | 11,755 |
| Wayne | 4,465 | 61.61% | 2,782 | 38.39% | 1,683 | 23.22% | 7,247 |
| Webster | 3,223 | 79.35% | 839 | 20.65% | 2,384 | 58.69% | 4,062 |
| Wilkinson | 1,169 | 34.49% | 2,220 | 65.51% | -1,051 | -31.01% | 3,389 |
| Winston | 3,664 | 56.06% | 2,872 | 43.94% | 792 | 12.12% | 6,536 |
| Yalobusha | 2,753 | 53.65% | 2,378 | 46.35% | 375 | 7.31% | 5,131 |
| Yazoo | 4,113 | 51.92% | 3,809 | 48.08% | 304 | 3.84% | 7,922 |
| Totals | 524,757 | 60.01% | 349,627 | 39.99% | 175,130 | 20.03% | 874,384 |

Counties that flipped from Democratic to Republican

- Attala (largest city: Kosciusko)
- Marshall (largest city: Holly Springs)

Counties that flipped from Republican to Democratic

- Jasper (largest city: Bay Springs)
- Lafayette (largest city: Oxford)
- Tallahatchie (largest city: Charleston)

==== By congressional district ====
Hosemann won three of four congressional districts.

| District | Hosemann | Hughes | Representative |
|---|---|---|---|
| 1st | 66% | 34% | Trent Kelly |
| 2nd | 41% | 59% | Bennie Thompson |
| 3rd | 63% | 37% | Michael Guest |
| 4th | 70% | 30% | Steven Palazzo |
