= 2018 United States Senate special election in Mississippi =

- November 6, 2018 (first round); November 27, 2018 (runoff)
- Turnout: 48.14%
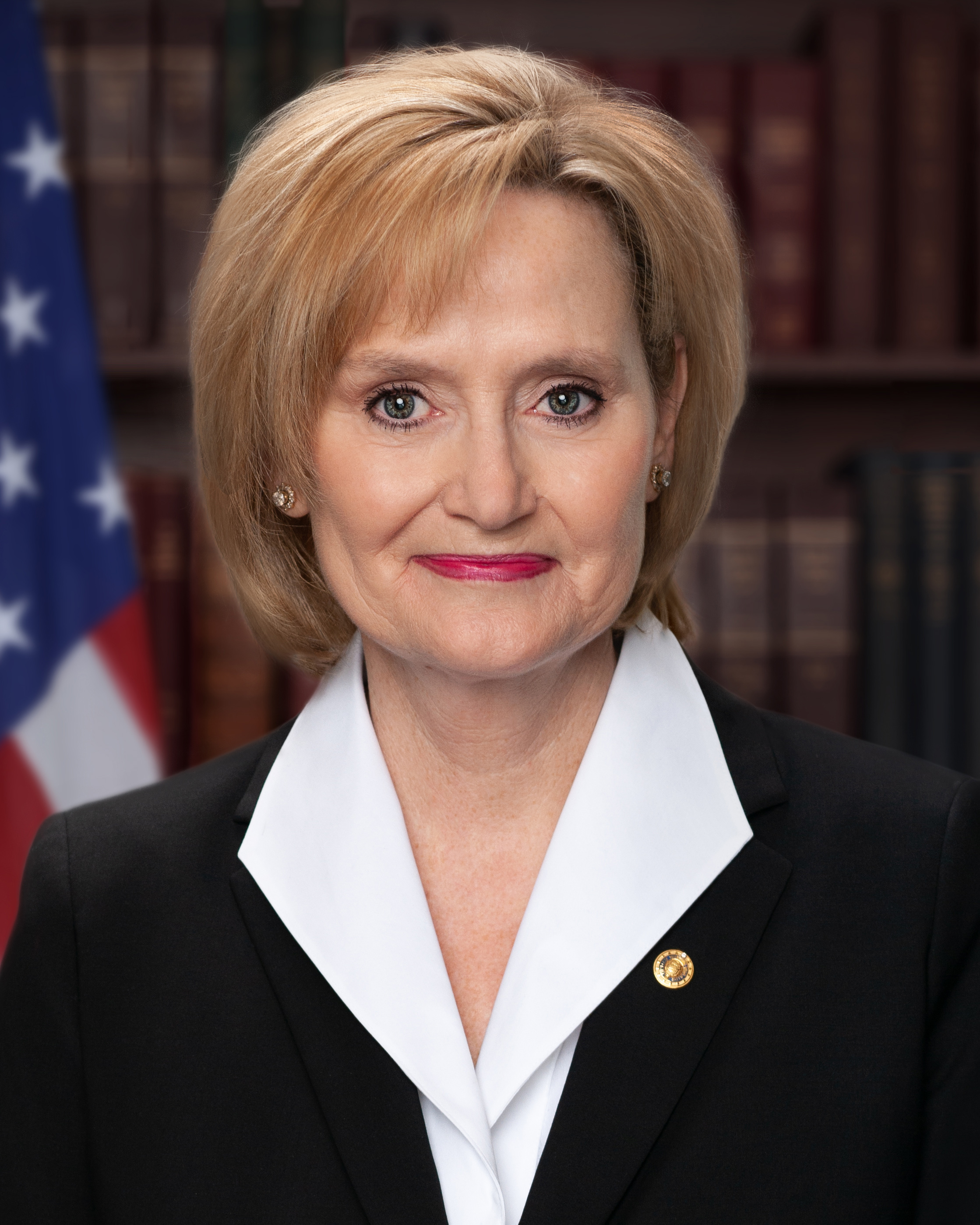

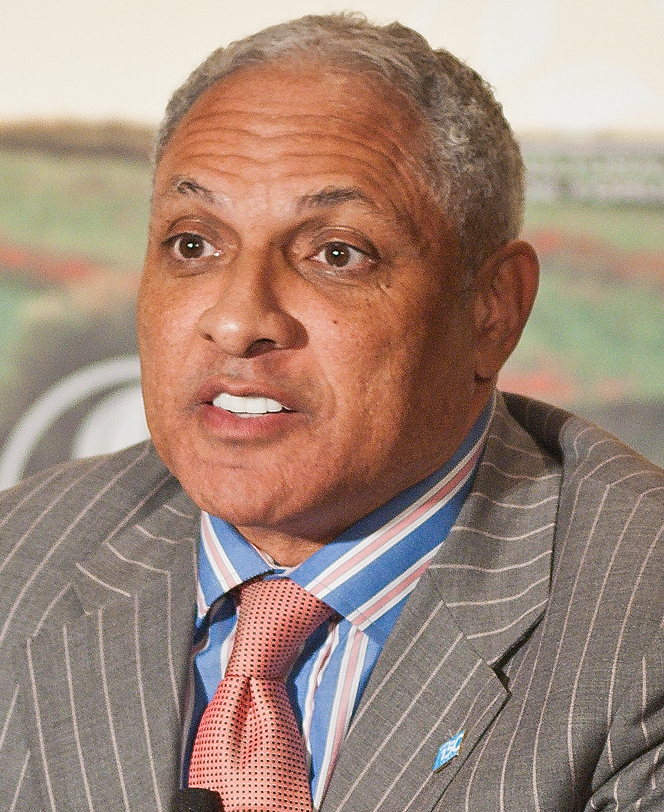

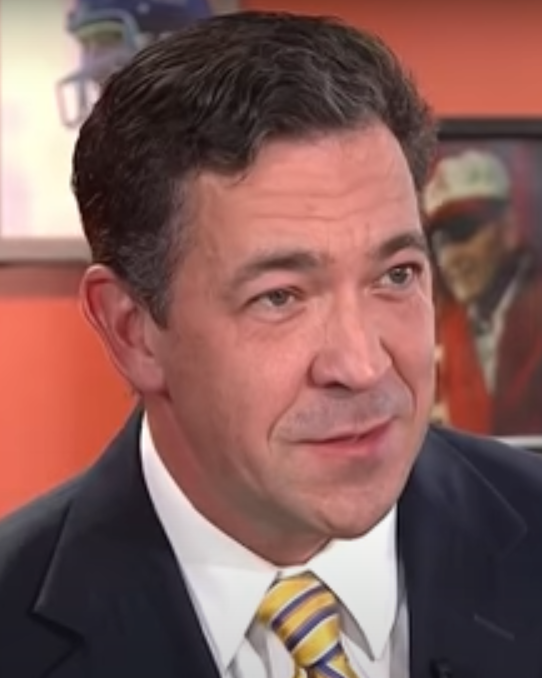
Candidate	Cindy Hyde-Smith	Mike Espy	Chris McDaniel
Party	Republican	Democratic	Republican
First round	389,995; 41.25%	386,742; 40.90%	154,878; 16.38%
Runoff	486,769; 53.63%	420,819; 46.37%	Eliminated
- Hyde-Smith: 30–40% 40–50% 50–60% 60–70% 70–80% 80–90% Espy: 30–40% 40–50% 50–60% 60–70% 70–80% 80–90% >90% McDaniel: 30–40% 40–50% 50–60% 60–70% 70–80% Bartee: 20–30% Tie: 40–50% 50–60% Hyde-Smith: 30–40% 40–50% 50–60% 60–70% 70–80% 80–90% Espy: 30–40% 40–50% 50–60% 60–70% 70–80% 80–90% >90% McDaniel: 30–40% 40–50% 50–60% 60–70% 70–80% Bartee: 20–30% Tie: 40–50% 50–60% Hyde-Smith: 30–40% 40–50% 50–60% 60–70% 70–80% 80–90% Espy: 30–40% 40–50% 50–60% 60–70% 70–80% 80–90% >90% McDaniel: 30–40% 40–50% 50–60% 60–70% 70–80% Bartee: 20–30% Tie: 40–50% 50–60% Hyde-Smith: 50–60% 60–70% 70–80% 80–90% >90% Espy: 50–60% 60–70% 70–80% 80–90% >90% Tie: 40–50% 50–60% Hyde-Smith: 50–60% 60–70% 70–80% 80–90% >90% Espy: 50–60% 60–70% 70–80% 80–90% >90% Tie: 40–50% 50–60% Hyde-Smith: 50–60% 60–70% 70–80% 80–90% >90% Espy: 50–60% 60–70% 70–80% 80–90% >90% Tie: 40–50% 50–60%
U.S. senator before election
Cindy Hyde-Smith (Note: In April 2018, Smith was appointed by Governor Phil Bryant to fill the vacancy caused by the resignation of Senator Thad Cochran, due to ill health.)
Republican
Elected U.S. Senator
Cindy Hyde-Smith
Republican

The 2018 United States Senate special election in Mississippi took place on November 6, 2018, in order to elect a member of the United States Senate to represent the state of Mississippi. On April 1, 2018, a U.S. Senate vacancy was created when Republican senator Thad Cochran resigned due to health concerns. Mississippi Governor Phil Bryant appointed Republican Cindy Hyde-Smith to fill the vacancy. Hyde-Smith sought election to serve the balance of Cochran's term, which was scheduled to expire in January 2021.

On November 6, 2018, per Mississippi law, a nonpartisan top-two special general election took place on the same day as the regularly scheduled U.S. Senate election for the seat then held by Roger Wicker. Party affiliations were not printed on the ballot. Because no candidate gained a simple majority of the vote, a runoff between the top two candidates, Hyde-Smith and Mike Espy, was held on November 27, 2018. Hyde-Smith defeated Espy, 53.63% to 46.37%.

The victory made Hyde-Smith the first woman ever elected to Congress from Mississippi.

== Candidates ==
- Note: Special elections in Mississippi are officially nonpartisan; however, each candidate's political party affiliation is indicated below.

=== Declared ===
- Tobey Bartee (Democratic Party), former Gautier city councilman
- Mike Espy (Democratic Party), former United States Secretary of Agriculture and former U.S. Representative
- Cindy Hyde-Smith (Republican Party), incumbent U.S. Senator and former Mississippi Commissioner of Agriculture and Commerce
- Chris McDaniel (Republican Party), state senator and candidate for this seat in 2014

=== Declined ===
- Jeramey Anderson, state representative (running for MS-4) (Democratic Party)
- David Baria, Mississippi House of Representatives Minority Leader (running for Class 1 U.S. Senate seat) (Democratic Party)
- Phil Bryant, governor of Mississippi (Republican Party)
- Jamie Franks, chairman of the Lee County Democratic Party and former state representative (Democratic Party)
- Andy Taggart, former chief of staff to former governor Kirk Fordice (Republican Party)

=== Withdrawn ===
- Jason Shelton, mayor of Tupelo (Democratic Party)

== General election ==
=== Endorsements ===
Cindy Hyde-Smith (R)

Executive branch officials

- Donald Trump, incumbent 45th president of the United States

Senators

- Thad Cochran, former U.S. Senator (R-MS)
- Joni Ernst, U.S. Senator (R-IA)
- Lindsey Graham, U.S. Senator (R-SC)
- Trent Lott, former Senate Majority Leader and U.S. Senator (R-MS)
- Roger Wicker, U.S. Senator (R-MS)

US representatives

- Gregg Harper, U.S. Representative (MS-3)
- Trent Kelly, U.S. Representative (MS-1)
- Steven Palazzo, U.S. Representative (MS-4)

Governors

- Haley Barbour, former governor of Mississippi
- Phil Bryant, governor of Mississippi

Statewide officials

- Mike Chaney, Insurance Commissioner of Mississippi
- Lynn Fitch, State Treasurer of Mississippi
- Philip Gunn, Speaker of the Mississippi House of Representatives
- Delbert Hosemann, Mississippi Secretary of State
- Stacey Pickering, State Auditor of Mississippi
- Tate Reeves, Lieutenant Governor of Mississippi

Political operatives

- Henry Barbour, Republican National Committeeman for Mississippi
- Jeanne Luckey, Republican National Committeewoman for Mississippi

Organizations

- Mississippi Manufacturers Association
- National Association of Realtors
- National Right to Life Committee
- NRA Political Victory Fund
- Susan B. Anthony List
- U.S. Chamber of Commerce
Chris McDaniel (R)

US Representatives

- Ron Paul, former U.S. Representative (TX-14)

State legislators

- Dana Criswell, state representative
- Steve Hopkins, state representative
- Tony Smith, former state senator

Political operatives

- Tommy Barnett, treasurer of Remember Mississippi super PAC
- Grant Sowell, chair of the Tupelo Tea Party
- Laura Van Overschelde, chair of the Mississippi Tea Party

Individuals

- Tommy Ferrell, former president of the National Sheriffs' Association
- Bryan Fischer, host of the American Family Association's conservative talk radio program Focal Point
- Lars Larson, talk radio show host
- Mark Levin, lawyer, author, and radio personality
- Kelli Ward, former Arizona State Senator and candidate for U.S. Senate in 2016 and 2018

Organizations

- Adams County GOP Executive Committee
- Americans for Legal Immigration PAC
- Gun Owners of America
- Jones County GOP Executive Committee
- Panola County GOP Executive Committee
- Tate County GOP Executive Committee
Mike Espy (D)

Executive branch officials

- Joe Biden, 46th Vice President of the United States
- Barack Obama, 44th President of the United States

Senators

- Cory Booker, U.S. Senator (D-NJ)
- Kamala Harris, U.S. Senator (D-CA)
- Brian Schatz, U.S. Senator (D-HI)
- Elizabeth Warren, U.S. Senator (D-MA)

US representatives

- Ayanna Pressley, U.S. Representative-elect (MA-7)
- Terri Sewell, U.S. Representative (AL-7)
- Bennie Thompson, U.S. Representative (MS-2)

Governors

- Deval Patrick, former governor of Massachusetts

Mayors

- Eric Garcetti, mayor of Los Angeles
- Mitch Landrieu, former mayor of New Orleans

Individuals

- Wesley Clark, U.S. Army general and presidential candidate in 2004
- Alyssa Milano, actress and activist

Organizations

- Democracy for America

=== Fundraising ===
Campaign finance reports as of October 12, 2018
Candidate	Total receipts	Total disbursements	Cash on hand
Cindy Hyde-Smith	$1,654,032	$264,232	$1,389,799
Mike Espy	$408,236	$126,760	$281,476
Chris McDaniel	$327,263	$171,208	$156,054
Source: Federal Election Commission

=== Polling ===
View source data.

Poll source	Date(s) administered	Sample size	Margin of error	Cindy Hyde-Smith	Mike Espy	Chris McDaniel	Tobey Bartee	Other	Undecided
Change Research (D)	November 2–4, 2018	1,003	–	27%	40%	28%	1%	–	–
NBC News/Marist	October 13–18, 2018	511 LV	± 6.1%	38%	29%	15%	2%	<1%	15%
NBC News/Marist	October 13–18, 2018	856 RV	± 4.7%	36%	28%	14%	3%	1%	17%
SurveyMonkey	September 9–24, 2018	985	± 4.3%	24%	25%	19%	4%	–	27%
Neighborhood Research Corporation (R-Courageous Conservatives PAC)	August 22–23 and 27–30, 2018	304	± 5.0%	27%	28%	18%	–	–	27%
The Mellman Group (D-Espy)	August 1–7, 2018	600	± 4.0%	29%	27%	17%	–	–	–
Triumph Campaigns	July 30–31, 2018	2,100	± 3.5%	41%	27%	15%	1%	–	16%
GS Strategy Group (U.S. Chamber of Commerce)	May 1–3, 2018	500	± 4.4%	30%	22%	17%	–	4%	–
Triumph Campaigns	April 10–11, 2018	1,000	± 3.0%	33%	33%	13%	–	6%	15%
Chism Strategies (D-Espy)	March 27, 2018	603	± 4.0%	27%	34%	21%	–	–	18%

=== Results ===
2018 United States Senate special election in Mississippi
Candidate	Votes	%
Cindy Hyde-Smith (incumbent)	389,995	41.25%
Mike Espy	386,742	40.90%
Chris McDaniel	154,878	16.38%
Tobey Bartee	13,852	1.47%
Total votes	945,467	100.00%

== Runoff ==
During the runoff campaign, while appearing with cattle rancher Colin Hutchinson in Tupelo, Mississippi, Hyde-Smith said, "If he invited me to a public hanging, I'd be in the front row." Hyde-Smith's comment immediately drew harsh criticism, given Mississippi's notorious history of lynchings of African-Americans. In response to the criticism, Hyde-Smith downplayed her comment as "an exaggerated expression of regard" and characterized the backlash as "ridiculous."

Hyde-Smith joined Mississippi Governor Phil Bryant at a news conference in Jackson, Mississippi on November 12, 2018, where she was asked repeatedly about her comment by reporters. In the footage, Hyde-Smith adamantly refused to provide any substantive answer to reporters' questions, responding on five occasions with variations of, "I put out a statement yesterday, and that's all I'm gonna say about it." When reporters redirected questions to Bryant, he defended Hyde-Smith's comment, and changed the subject to abortion, saying he was "confused about where the outrage is at about 20 million African American children that have been aborted."

On November 15, 2018, Hyde-Smith appeared in a video clip saying that it would be "a great idea" to make it more difficult for liberals to vote. Her campaign stated that Hyde-Smith was making an obvious joke, and the video was selectively edited. Both this and the "public hanging" video were released by Lamar White Jr., a Louisiana blogger and journalist. Attention was also drawn to photographs, posted on Facebook four years earlier, of Hyde-Smith and her husband visiting former Confederate President Jefferson Davis' home, a historic site. The photos show her wearing a Confederate hat and posing with a rifle commonly used by Confederate soldiers.

=== Debate ===
2018 United States Senate election in Mississippi runoff debate
No.	Date	Host	Moderator	Link	Republican	Democratic
Key: P Participant A Absent N Not invited I Invited W Withdrawn						
Key: P Participant A Absent N Not invited I Invited W Withdrawn					Cindy Hyde-Smith	Mike Espy
1	November 20, 2018	Mississippi Farm Bureau Federation	Maggie Wade		P	P

=== Predictions ===
Source	Ranking	As of
The Cook Political Report	Lean R	October 26, 2018
Inside Elections	Likely R	November 20, 2018
Sabato's Crystal Ball	Likely R	November 5, 2018
Fox News	Lean R	October 10, 2018
CNN	Safe R	October 12, 2018
RealClearPolitics	Likely R	October 12, 2018
FiveThirtyEight	Lean R	November 5, 2018

=== Polling ===
View source data.

Poll source	Date(s) administered	Sample size	Margin of error	Cindy Hyde-Smith	Mike Espy	Other	Undecided
Change Research (D)	November 25, 2018	1,211	–	51%	46%	–	–
JMC Analytics/Bold Blue Campaigns (D)	November 19–21 and 23–24, 2018	684	± 4.0%	54%	44%	–	1%
NBC News/Marist	October 13–18, 2018	511 LV	± 6.1%	50%	36%	1%	13%
NBC News/Marist	October 13–18, 2018	856 RV	± 4.7%	47%	38%	1%	14%
The Mellman Group (D-Espy)	August 1–7, 2018	600	± 4.0%	38%	41%	–	–
Triumph Campaigns	July 30–31, 2018	2,100	± 3.5%	48%	34%	–	18%
Mason-Dixon	April 12–14, 2018	625	± 4.0%	46%	34%	–	20%
Triumph Campaigns	April 10–11, 2018	1,000	± 3.0%	42%	36%	–	23%

Hypothetical polling

with Chris McDaniel and Mike Espy

Poll source	Date(s) administered	Sample size	Margin of error	Chris McDaniel	Mike Espy	Other	Undecided
Marist College	October 13–18, 2018	511 LV	± 6.1%	36%	43%	2%	19%
Marist College	October 13–18, 2018	856 RV	± 4.7%	35%	43%	2%	19%
The Mellman Group (D–Espy)	August 1–7, 2018	600	± 4.0%	27%	45%	–	–
Triumph Campaigns	July 30–31, 2018	2,100	± 3.5%	26%	41%	–	33%
Mason-Dixon	April 12–14, 2018	625	± 4.0%	40%	42%	–	18%
Triumph Campaigns	April 10–11, 2018	1,000	± 3.0%	24%	43%	–	33%

=== Results ===
2018 United States Senate special runoff election in Mississippi
Candidate	Votes	%	±
Cindy Hyde-Smith (incumbent)	486,769	53.63%	-6.27%
Mike Espy	420,819	46.37%	+8.48%
Total votes	907,588	100.00%	N/A

==== By county ====
County	Cindy Hyde-Smith Republican		Mike Espy Democratic		Margin		Total
County	#	%	#	%	#	%	Total
Adams	4,113	38.80%	6,488	61.20%	-2,375	-22.40%	10,601
Alcorn	7,120	77.36%	2,084	22.64%	5,036	54.72%	9,204
Amite	2,912	58.11%	2,099	41.89%	813	16.22%	5,011
Attala	3,473	55.33%	2,804	44.67%	669	10.66%	6,277
Benton	1,387	53.12%	1,224	46.88%	163	6.24%	2,611
Bolivar	3,331	30.60%	7,554	69.40%	-4,223	-38.80%	10,885
Calhoun	3,046	66.78%	1,515	33.22%	1,531	33.57%	4,561
Carroll	2,612	64.67%	1,427	35.33%	1,185	29.34%	4,039
Chickasaw	2,955	47.93%	3,210	52.07%	-255	-4.14%	6,165
Choctaw	1,932	65.89%	1,000	34.11%	932	31.79%	2,932
Claiborne	453	12.77%	3,095	87.23%	-2,642	-74.46%	3,548
Clarke	3,486	61.79%	2,156	38.21%	1,330	23.57%	5,642
Clay	3,036	37.95%	4,965	62.05%	-1,929	-24.11%	8,001
Coahoma	1,748	25.48%	5,111	74.52%	-3,363	-49.03%	6,859
Copiah	4,694	44.35%	5,891	55.65%	-1,197	-11.31%	10,585
Covington	3,828	57.28%	2,855	42.72%	973	14.56%	6,683
DeSoto	25,326	59.06%	17,558	40.94%	7,768	18.11%	42,884
Forrest	10,933	50.75%	10,608	49.25%	325	1.51%	21,541
Franklin	1,957	61.14%	1,244	38.86%	713	22.27%	3,201
George	4,900	84.64%	889	15.36%	4,011	69.29%	5,789
Greene	2,422	78.56%	661	21.44%	1,761	57.12%	3,083
Grenada	3,943	52.67%	3,543	47.33%	400	5.34%	7,486
Hancock	8,716	74.07%	3,051	25.93%	5,665	48.14%	11,767
Harrison	28,167	59.29%	19,339	40.71%	8,828	18.58%	47,506
Hinds	18,464	22.98%	61,892	77.02%	-43,428	-54.04%	80,356
Holmes	974	14.35%	5,814	85.65%	-4,840	-71.30%	6,788
Humphreys	851	23.99%	2,696	76.01%	-1,845	-52.02%	3,547
Issaquena	227	42.67%	305	57.33%	-78	-14.66%	532
Itawamba	5,714	86.00%	930	14.00%	4,784	72.00%	6,644
Jackson	23,119	64.33%	12,821	35.67%	10,298	28.65%	35,940
Jasper	2,796	43.17%	3,680	56.83%	-884	-13.65%	6,476
Jefferson	385	12.06%	2,807	87.94%	-2,422	-75.88%	3,192
Jefferson Davis	1,792	35.86%	3,205	64.14%	-1,413	-28.28%	4,997
Jones	13,420	65.89%	6,946	34.11%	6,474	31.79%	20,366
Kemper	1,270	36.53%	2,207	63.47%	-937	-26.95%	3,477
Lafayette	7,702	50.61%	7,516	49.39%	186	1.22%	15,218
Lamar	13,200	72.78%	4,936	27.22%	8,264	45.57%	18,136
Lauderdale	12,224	57.11%	9,180	42.89%	3,044	14.22%	21,404
Lawrence	3,222	62.72%	1,915	37.28%	1,307	25.44%	5,137
Leake	3,534	53.28%	3,099	46.72%	435	6.56%	6,633
Lee	16,493	63.57%	9,453	36.43%	7,040	27.13%	25,946
Leflore	2,499	28.62%	6,234	71.38%	-3,735	-42.77%	8,733
Lincoln	8,536	68.05%	4,008	31.95%	4,528	36.10%	12,544
Lowndes	9,263	48.63%	9,786	51.37%	-523	-2.75%	19,049
Madison	23,558	54.83%	19,407	45.17%	4,151	9.66%	42,965
Marion	5,496	63.67%	3,136	36.33%	2,360	27.34%	8,632
Marshall	4,462	41.33%	6,334	58.67%	-1,872	-17.34%	10,796
Monroe	7,127	60.05%	4,742	39.95%	2,385	20.09%	11,869
Montgomery	2,036	54.37%	1,709	45.63%	327	8.73%	3,745
Neshoba	5,222	70.70%	2,164	29.30%	3,058	41.40%	7,386
Newton	4,645	66.90%	2,298	33.10%	2,347	33.80%	6,943
Noxubee	900	21.86%	3,217	78.14%	-2,317	-56.28%	4,117
Oktibbeha	6,028	43.86%	7,717	56.14%	-1,689	-12.29%	13,745
Panola	4,929	44.78%	6,077	55.22%	-1,148	-10.43%	11,006
Pearl River	10,322	78.48%	2,830	21.52%	7,492	56.96%	13,152
Perry	2,754	72.23%	1,059	27.77%	1,695	44.45%	3,813
Pike	5,795	46.46%	6,677	53.54%	-882	-7.07%	12,472
Pontotoc	7,304	77.98%	2,062	22.02%	5,242	55.97%	9,366
Prentiss	5,206	73.93%	1,836	26.07%	3,370	47.86%	7,042
Quitman	684	27.67%	1,788	72.33%	-1,104	-44.66%	2,472
Rankin	34,333	71.29%	13,826	28.71%	20,507	42.58%	48,159
Scott	4,429	54.85%	3,646	45.15%	783	9.70%	8,075
Sharkey	496	29.38%	1,192	70.62%	-696	-41.23%	1,688
Simpson	5,404	61.15%	3,433	38.85%	1,971	22.30%	8,837
Smith	4,180	73.64%	1,496	26.36%	2,684	47.29%	5,676
Stone	3,724	73.35%	1,353	26.65%	2,371	46.70%	5,077
Sunflower	2,034	27.73%	5,301	72.27%	-3,267	-44.54%	7,335
Tallahatchie	1,691	38.59%	2,691	61.41%	-1,000	-22.82%	4,382
Tate	4,935	60.49%	3,223	39.51%	1,712	20.99%	8,158
Tippah	4,868	75.71%	1,562	24.29%	3,306	51.42%	6,430
Tishomingo	4,552	83.57%	895	16.43%	3,657	67.14%	5,447
Tunica	578	22.98%	1,937	77.02%	-1,359	-54.04%	2,515
Union	6,409	79.98%	1,604	20.02%	4,805	59.97%	8,013
Walthall	2,716	53.84%	2,329	46.16%	387	7.67%	5,045
Warren	7,082	47.09%	7,957	52.91%	-875	-5.82%	15,039
Washington	3,583	27.12%	9,629	72.88%	-6,046	-45.76%	13,212
Wayne	4,036	57.02%	3,042	42.98%	994	14.04%	7,078
Webster	2,937	77.66%	845	22.34%	2,092	55.31%	3,782
Wilkinson	851	30.21%	1,966	69.79%	-1,115	-39.58%	2,817
Winston	3,559	52.29%	3,247	47.71%	312	4.58%	6,806
Yalobusha	2,281	51.09%	2,184	48.91%	97	2.17%	4,465
Yazoo	3,448	42.81%	4,607	57.19%	-1,159	-14.39%	8,055
Totals	486,769	53.63%	420,819	46.37%	65,950	7.27%	907,588

==== Counties that flipped from Democratic to Republican ====
- Benton (largest municipality: Ashland)
- Prentiss (largest city: Booneville)

==== Counties that flipped from Republican to Democratic ====
- Adams (largest city: Natchez)
- Copiah (largest city: Crystal Springs)
- Issaquena (largest city: Mayersville)
- Lowndes (largest city: Columbus)
- Oktibbeha (largest city: Starkville)
- Panola (largest city: Batesville)
- Pike (largest city: McComb)
- Warren (largest city: Vicksburg)
- Yazoo (largest city: Yazoo City)

==== By congressional district ====
Hyde-Smith won three of four congressional districts.

District	Hyde-Smith	Espy	Representative
1st	61%	39%	Trent Kelly
2nd	32%	68%	Bennie Thompson
3rd	58%	42%	Michael Guest
4th	65%	35%	Steven Palazzo
