= Mississippi's 3rd congressional district =

U.S. House district for Mississippi

Coordinates: 32°00′56″N 89°44′48″W

- Interactive map of district boundaries since January 3, 2023
- Representative: Michael Guest; R–Brandon
- Area: 12,185.28 mi^{2} (31,559.7 km^{2})
- Distribution: 59.67% rural; 40.33% urban
- Population (2025): 747,045
- Median household income: $63,975
- Ethnicity: 59.3% White; 32.9% Black; 2.8% Hispanic; 2.4% Two or more races; 1.2% Asian; 1.1% Native American; 0.3% other
- Cook PVI: R+14

Mississippi's 3rd congressional district (MS-3) covers central portions of state and stretches from the Louisiana border in the west to the Alabama border in the east.

Large cities in the district include Brookhaven, Gluckstadt, Madison, Meridian, Ridgeland, Starkville, and Pearl. It also includes most of the wealthier portions of Jackson, including the portion of the city located in Rankin County. The district includes Mississippi State University in Starkville.

From statehood to the election of 1846, Mississippi elected representatives at-large statewide on a general ticket. This district has been redefined based on changes in statewide population.

Its current representative is Republican Michael Guest.

== Recent election results from statewide races ==
Year	Office	Results
2008	President	McCain 62% - 37%
2008	Senate (Reg.)	Cochran 68% - 32%
2008	Senate (Spec.)	Wicker 61% - 39%
2012	President	Romney 62% - 38%
2016	President	Trump 63% - 35%
2018	Senate (Reg.)	Wicker 63% - 35%
2018	Senate (Spec.)	Hyde-Smith 60% - 40%
2019	Governor	Reeves 55% - 43%
2019	Lt. Governor	Hosemann 65% - 35%
2019	Attorney General	Fitch 63% - 37%
2020	President	Trump 62% - 37%
2020	Senate	Hyde-Smith 59% - 39%
2023	Governor	Reeves 56% - 43%
2023	Lt. Governor	Hosemann 65% - 35%
2023	Secretary of State	Watson 64% - 36%
2023	Attorney General	Fitch 62% - 38%
2023	Auditor	White 63% - 37%
2023	Treasurer	McRae 63% - 37%
2024	President	Trump 64% - 35%
2024	Senate	Wicker 66% - 34%
2026	Senate	Hyde-Smith 53% - 45%

== Composition ==
The 3rd district includes the entirety of the following counties with the exception of Oktibbeha, which it shares with the 1st, Hinds and Madison, which it shares with the 2nd district, and Jones, which it shares with the 4th. Oktibbeha County communities in the 3rd include Starkville, Mississippi State, and Longview; Jones County communities include Sandersville, Sharon, and part of Laurel; and Madison County communities include Madison, Ridgeland, most of Gluckstadt, and parts of Canton and Flora. The Hinds County portion of the district takes in eastern Jackson.

#	County	Seat	Population
23	Clarke	Quitman	15,228
31	Covington	Collins	18,059
49	Hinds	Jackson, Raymond	214,870
61	Jasper	Bay Springs, Paulding	16,013
65	Jefferson Davis	Prentiss	10,969
67	Jones	Laurel, Ellisville	66,250
69	Kemper	De Kalb	8,584
75	Lauderdale	Meridian	70,527
77	Lawrence	Monticello	11,741
85	Lincoln	Brookhaven	34,702
89	Madison	Canton	112,511
91	Marion	Columbia	24,224
99	Neshoba	Philadelphia	28,789
101	Newton	Decatur	21,019
103	Noxubee	Macon	9,914
105	Oktibbeha	Starkville	51,203
113	Pike	Magnolia	39,394
121	Rankin	Brandon	160,417
123	Scott	Forest	27,507
127	Simpson	Mendenhall	25,715
129	Smith	Raleigh	14,099
147	Walthall	Tylertown	13,863
159	Winston	Louisville	17,416

== List of members representing the district ==
Member	Party	Years of service	Cong ress	Electoral history	District location and map
District created March 4, 1847
Patrick Watson Tompkins (Vicksburg)	Whig	March 4, 1847 – March 3, 1849	30th	Elected in 1846. Retired.	
William McWillie (Camden)	Democratic	December 3, 1849 – March 3, 1851	31st	Elected in 1848. Lost re-election as a Southern Rights candidate.	
John D. Freeman (Jackson)	Union	March 4, 1851 – March 3, 1853	32nd	Elected in 1851. Retired.	
Otho Robards Singleton (Canton)	Democratic	March 4, 1853 – March 3, 1855	33rd	Elected in 1853. Redistricted to the 4th district and lost re-election.	
William Barksdale (Columbus)	Democratic	March 4, 1855 – January 12, 1861	34th 35th 36th	Redistricted from the at-large district and re-elected in 1855. Elected in 1857. Re-elected in 1859. Withdrew due to Civil War.	
Vacant		January 12, 1861 – April 8, 1870	36th 37th 38th 39th 40th 41st	Civil War and Reconstruction	
Henry Barry (Columbus)	Republican	April 8, 1870 – March 3, 1875	41st 42nd 43rd	Elected in 1869 to finish the term and to the next term. Re-elected in 1872. Retired.	
Hernando D. Money (Winona)	Democratic	March 4, 1875 – March 3, 1883	44th 45th 46th 47th	Elected in 1874. Re-elected in 1876. Re-elected in 1878. Re-elected in 1880. Redistricted to the 4th district.	
Elza Jeffords (Mayersville)	Republican	March 4, 1883 – March 3, 1885	48th	Elected in 1882; Retired.	
Thomas C. Catchings (Vicksburg)	Democratic	March 4, 1885 – March 3, 1901	49th 50th 51st 52nd 53rd 54th 55th 56th	Elected in 1884. Re-elected in 1886. Re-elected in 1888. Re-elected in 1890. Re-elected in 1892. Re-elected in 1894. Re-elected in 1896. Re-elected in 1898. Retired.	
Patrick Stevens Henry (Vicksburg)	Democratic	March 4, 1901 – March 3, 1903	57th	Elected in 1900. Lost renomination.	
Benjamin G. Humphreys II (Greenville)	Democratic	March 4, 1903 – October 16, 1923	58th 59th 60th 61st 62nd 63rd 64th 65th 66th 67th 68th	Elected in 1902. Re-elected in 1904. Re-elected in 1906. Re-elected in 1908. Re-elected in 1910. Re-elected in 1912. Re-elected in 1914. Re-elected in 1916. Re-elected in 1918. Re-elected in 1920. Re-elected in 1922. Died.	
Vacant		October 16, 1923 – November 27, 1923	68th		
William Y. Humphreys (Greenville)	Democratic	November 27, 1923 – March 3, 1925	68th	Elected to finish his father's term. Retired.	
William M. Whittington (Greenwood)	Democratic	March 4, 1925 – January 3, 1951	69th 70th 71st 72nd 73rd 74th 75th 76th 77th 78th 79th 80th 81st	Elected in 1924. Re-elected in 1926. Re-elected in 1928. Re-elected in 1930. Re-elected in 1932. Re-elected in 1934. Re-elected in 1936. Re-elected in 1938. Re-elected in 1940. Re-elected in 1942. Re-elected in 1944. Re-elected in 1946. Re-elected in 1948. Retired.	
Frank E. Smith (Greenwood)	Democratic	January 3, 1951 – November 14, 1962	82nd 83rd 84th 85th 86th 87th	Elected in 1950. Re-elected in 1952. Re-elected in 1954. Re-elected in 1956. Re-elected in 1958. Re-elected in 1960. Retired and resigned to become member of the Board of Directors of the Tennessee Valley Authority.	
Vacant		November 14, 1962 – January 3, 1963	87th		
John Bell Williams (Raymond)	Democratic	January 3, 1963 – January 16, 1968	88th 89th 90th	Redistricted from the 4th district and re-elected in 1962. Re-elected in 1964. Re-elected in 1966. Resigned when elected Governor of Mississippi.	
Vacant		January 16, 1968 – March 12, 1968	90th		
Charles Hudson Griffin (Utica)	Democratic	March 12, 1968 – January 3, 1973	90th 91st 92nd	Elected to finish Williams's term. Re-elected in 1968. Re-elected in 1970. Retired.	
Sonny Montgomery (Meridian)	Democratic	January 3, 1973 – January 3, 1997	93rd 94th 95th 96th 97th 98th 99th 100th 101st 102nd 103rd 104th	Redistricted from the 4th district and re-elected in 1972. Re-elected in 1974. Re-elected in 1976. Re-elected in 1978. Re-elected in 1980. Re-elected in 1982. Re-elected in 1984. Re-elected in 1986. Re-elected in 1988. Re-elected in 1990. Re-elected in 1992. Re-elected in 1994. Retired.	
Chip Pickering (Hebron)	Republican	January 3, 1997 – January 3, 2009	105th 106th 107th 108th 109th 110th	Elected in 1996. Re-elected in 1998. Re-elected in 2000. Re-elected in 2002. Re-elected in 2004. Re-elected in 2006. Retired.	
Chip Pickering (Hebron)	Republican	January 3, 1997 – January 3, 2009	105th 106th 107th 108th 109th 110th	Elected in 1996. Re-elected in 1998. Re-elected in 2000. Re-elected in 2002. Re-elected in 2004. Re-elected in 2006. Retired.	2003–2013
Gregg Harper (Pearl)	Republican	January 3, 2009 – January 3, 2019	111th 112th 113th 114th 115th	Elected in 2008. Re-elected in 2010. Re-elected in 2012. Re-elected in 2014. Re-elected in 2016. Retired.	2003–2013
Gregg Harper (Pearl)	Republican	January 3, 2009 – January 3, 2019	111th 112th 113th 114th 115th	Elected in 2008. Re-elected in 2010. Re-elected in 2012. Re-elected in 2014. Re-elected in 2016. Retired.	2013–2023
Michael Guest (Brandon)	Republican	January 3, 2019 – present	116th 117th 118th 119th	Elected in 2018. Re-elected in 2020. Re-elected in 2022. Re-elected in 2024. Re-elected in 2026.	2013–2023
Michael Guest (Brandon)	Republican	January 3, 2019 – present	116th 117th 118th 119th	Elected in 2018. Re-elected in 2020. Re-elected in 2022. Re-elected in 2024. Re-elected in 2026.	2023–present

== Recent election results ==
=== 2012 ===
Mississippi's 3rd congressional district, 2012
Party	Candidate	Votes	%
Republican	Gregg Harper (incumbent)	234,717	80.0
Reform	John Luke Pannell	58,605	20.0
Total votes		293,322	100.0
Republican hold			

=== 2014 ===
Mississippi's 3rd congressional district, 2014
Party	Candidate	Votes	%
Republican	Gregg Harper (incumbent)	117,771	68.9
Democratic	Doug Magee	47,744	27.9
Independent	Roger Gerrard	3,890	2.3
Reform	Barbara Dale Washer	1,541	0.9
Total votes		170,946	100.0
Republican hold			

=== 2016 ===
Mississippi's 3rd congressional district, 2016
Party	Candidate	Votes	%
Republican	Gregg Harper (incumbent)	209,490	66.2
Democratic	Dennis C. Quinn	96,101	30.4
Independent	Roger Gerrard	8,696	2.7
Reform	Lajena Sheets	2,158	0.7
Total votes		316,445	100.0
Republican hold			

=== 2018 ===
Mississippi's 3rd congressional district, 2018
Party	Candidate	Votes	%
Republican	Michael Guest	160,284	62.3
Democratic	Michael Evans	94,461	36.7
Reform	Matthew Holland	2,526	1.0
Total votes		257,271	100.0
Republican hold			

=== 2020 ===
Mississippi's 3rd congressional district, 2020
Party	Candidate	Votes	%
Republican	Michael Guest (incumbent)	221,064	64.7
Democratic	Dorothy "Dot" Benford	120,782	35.3
Total votes		341,846	100.0
Republican hold			

=== 2022 ===
Mississippi's 3rd congressional district, 2022
Party	Candidate	Votes	%
Republican	Michael Guest (incumbent)	132,481	70.74
Democratic	Shuwaski Young	54,803	29.26
Total votes		187,284	100.00
Republican hold			

=== 2024 ===
Mississippi's 3rd congressional district, 2024
Party	Candidate	Votes	%
Republican	Michael Guest (incumbent)	265,159	100.00
Total votes		265,159	100.00
Republican hold			

== See also ==
- Mississippi's congressional districts
- List of United States congressional districts
