= Joe Nosef =

American lawyer

Chair of the Mississippi Republican Party
- In office 2012–2017
- Preceded by: Arnie Hederman
- Succeeded by: Lucien Smith

Personal details
- Born: Joseph David Nosef, III; December 14, 1968 (age 57) Clarksdale, Mississippi, U.S.
- Party: Republican
- Spouse: Amy Nosef
- Children: 2
- Education: University of Mississippi, Oxford (BS, JD); University of Florida (LLM)

Joseph David Nosef, III (born December 14, 1968) is an American lawyer and politician from Mississippi. and former chairman of the Mississippi Republican Party.

== Personal life ==
Nosef was born in Clarksdale in northwestern Mississippi, the son of Mayor Joseph D. Nosef, Jr., and educator Joyce Nosef. His father died in 1975, and his mother was left to rear him.

Nosef earned his bachelor's and master's degrees in accounting at the University of Mississippi in 1991 and 1994, respectively. He received his Juris Doctor from the University of Mississippi in 1995 and was admitted to the Mississippi Bar in 1996. He also holds a Master of Laws in Taxation from the University of Florida which he received in 1996.

He is a practicing Roman Catholic, is married, and has two daughters.

== Political career ==
Nosef's first political involvement was with the Hinds County Republican Party, where he has served on the executive committee since 2000.

He served as the Chief Counsel to Governor Haley Barbour from 2004-2006 until he resigned to run Barbour's 2007 re-election campaign. In 2008, he served as Chief of Staff to Lt. Gov. Phil Bryant, and led the gubernatorial transition campaign after Bryant was elected governor in the 2011 election.

In 2012, Mississippi Republican Party chairman Arnie Hederman resigned. Nosef was elected for the remainder of Hederman's term on January 11, 2012, and elected to a full four-year term in May 2012.

Party political offices
Preceded by Arnie Hederman	Chair of the Mississippi Republican Party; 2012–2017	Succeeded by Lucien Smith
