= Delbert Hosemann =

American politician (born 1947)

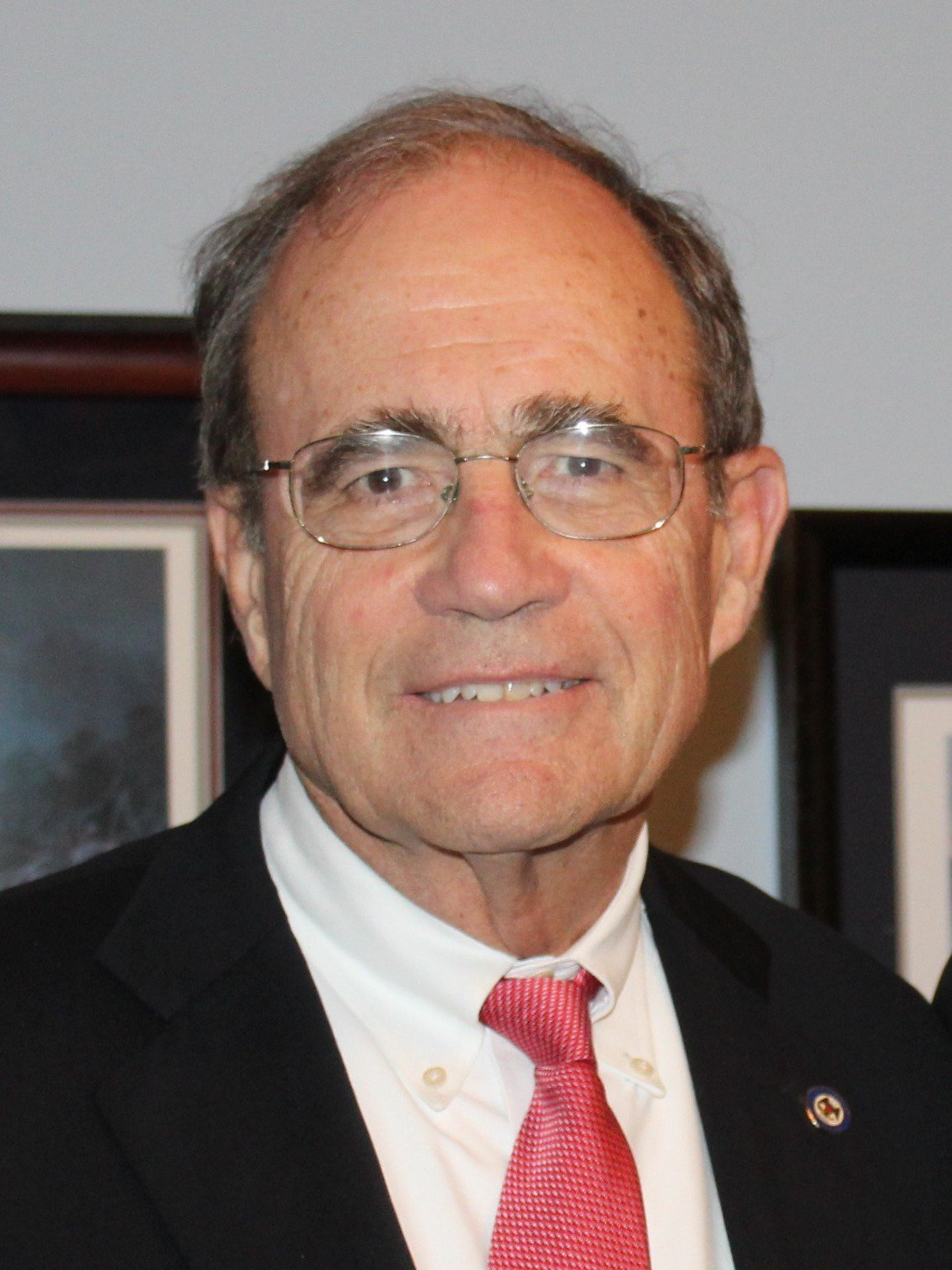
- Hosemann in 2019

33rd Lieutenant Governor of Mississippi
- Incumbent
- Assumed office January 14, 2020
- Governor: Tate Reeves
- Preceded by: Tate Reeves

35th Secretary of State of Mississippi
- In office January 10, 2008 – January 14, 2020
- Governor: Haley Barbour; Phil Bryant
- Preceded by: Eric Clark
- Succeeded by: Michael Watson

Personal details
- Born: Charles Delbert Hosemann Jr. June 30, 1947 (age 79) Vicksburg, Mississippi, U.S.
- Party: Republican
- Education: University of Notre Dame (BA); University of Mississippi (JD); New York University (LLM)
- Website: Official website

Military service
- Branch/service: United States Army Reserves

Charles Delbert Hosemann Jr. (born June 30, 1947) is an American attorney and politician serving as the 33rd lieutenant governor of Mississippi since 2020. A member of the Republican Party, he previously served as the secretary of state of Mississippi from 2008 to 2020. Before entering public office, Hosemann practiced business and tax law for over three decades, specializing in mergers and acquisitions.

A native of Vicksburg, Mississippi, Hosemann attended the University of Notre Dame, the University of Mississippi School of Law, and New York University, where he earned a Master of Laws in Taxation. He enlisted in the United States Army Reserve in 1969, serving for eight years. Hosemann first ran for office in 1981 in a special election for Mississippi’s 4th congressional district but failed to secure the Republican nomination. He later became the party's nominee for the district in 1998 but lost in the general election. In 2003, he briefly campaigned for attorney general before withdrawing from the race.

Hosemann was elected Secretary of State in 2007, becoming the first Republican to hold the position since Reconstruction. During his tenure, he implemented voter ID laws, managed election integrity efforts, and oversaw the modernization of business registration systems. After three terms in office, he was elected lieutenant governor in 2019, defeating Democratic state representative Jay Hughes. As lieutenant governor, he has focused on tax reform, infrastructure investment, education funding, and Medicaid expansion. In 2023, he won re-election after fending off a primary challenge from far-right firebrand and State Senator Chris McDaniel.

== Early life and career ==
Hosemann was born on June 30, 1947, in Vicksburg in western Mississippi. He was the oldest of three children, having two sisters. His heritage is Catholic-Austrian on his father's side and Irish on his mother's side. His father, C. Delbert Hosemann, was a tax lawyer in Vicksburg and a Lions Club governor.

He graduated from the St. Aloysius High School in Vicksburg. He received his Bachelor of Business Administration degree in 1969 from the University of Notre Dame in South Bend, Indiana. After college, he joined the United States Army Reserve, enlisting in August 1969 for a six-year commitment; he served eight. He also worked briefly in Dayton, Ohio, to earn money for law school.

In 1972, he earned his Juris Doctor from the University of Mississippi School of Law in Oxford. In 1973, he obtained a Master of Laws in Taxation at New York University. At NYU, he focused on mergers and acquisitions.

In 1973, he joined the law firm Magruder, Montgomery, Brocato and Hosemann, working in the mergers and acquisitions practice. After the passage of the Employee Retirement Income Security Act in 1974, he became an expert in employee retirement plans. He departed in 1988. Afterwards, he became a partner at Phelps Dunbar LLP, specializing in business and tax law, until his election into office.

== Early political ambitions ==
=== 1981 Congressional special election ===
Upon the resignation of U.S. Representative Jon Hinson from Mississippi's 4th congressional district in 1981, Hosemann, who was at the time a political unknown, considered running for the seat in the special election. In March 1981, he announced his candidacy for the seat as a Republican, saying he would run a "positive and upbeat" campaign. In his announcement, he lamented unnecessary regulations and restrictions. However, the 100-delegate district GOP convention in April elected Liles Williams over Hosemann in a 54-44 ballot. Hosemann considered running in the 1982 election for the 4th district after losing in the special.

=== 1998 Congressional campaign ===
Hosemann was the Republican candidate for election to Mississippi's 4th congressional district in 1998. Hosemann came first in the primary and later won in the runoff election despite criticisms of being a "closet liberal" for donating to Democratic Mississippi governor Ray Mabus in 1987. Governor Kirk Fordice endorsed Hosemann's runoff opponent in the primary. Hosemann had support from the National Rifle Association and the National Right to Life Committee.

Hosemann was considered a strong candidate: he had a financial advantage, early advertising, and running during the Clinton-Lewinsky scandal. However, the seat was considered one of the Democrat's best opportunities, and conservative Democrat Ronnie Shows, a state transportation commissioner, won.

=== 2003 attorney general election ===
Hosemann was considered a potential candidate for the attorney general in the 2003 elections. He eventually ran in the Republican primary against two other candidates. He dropped out of the race in March 2003 out of concerns of exhausting funds from party donors in a three-way race.

== Secretary of State of Mississippi (2008–2020) ==
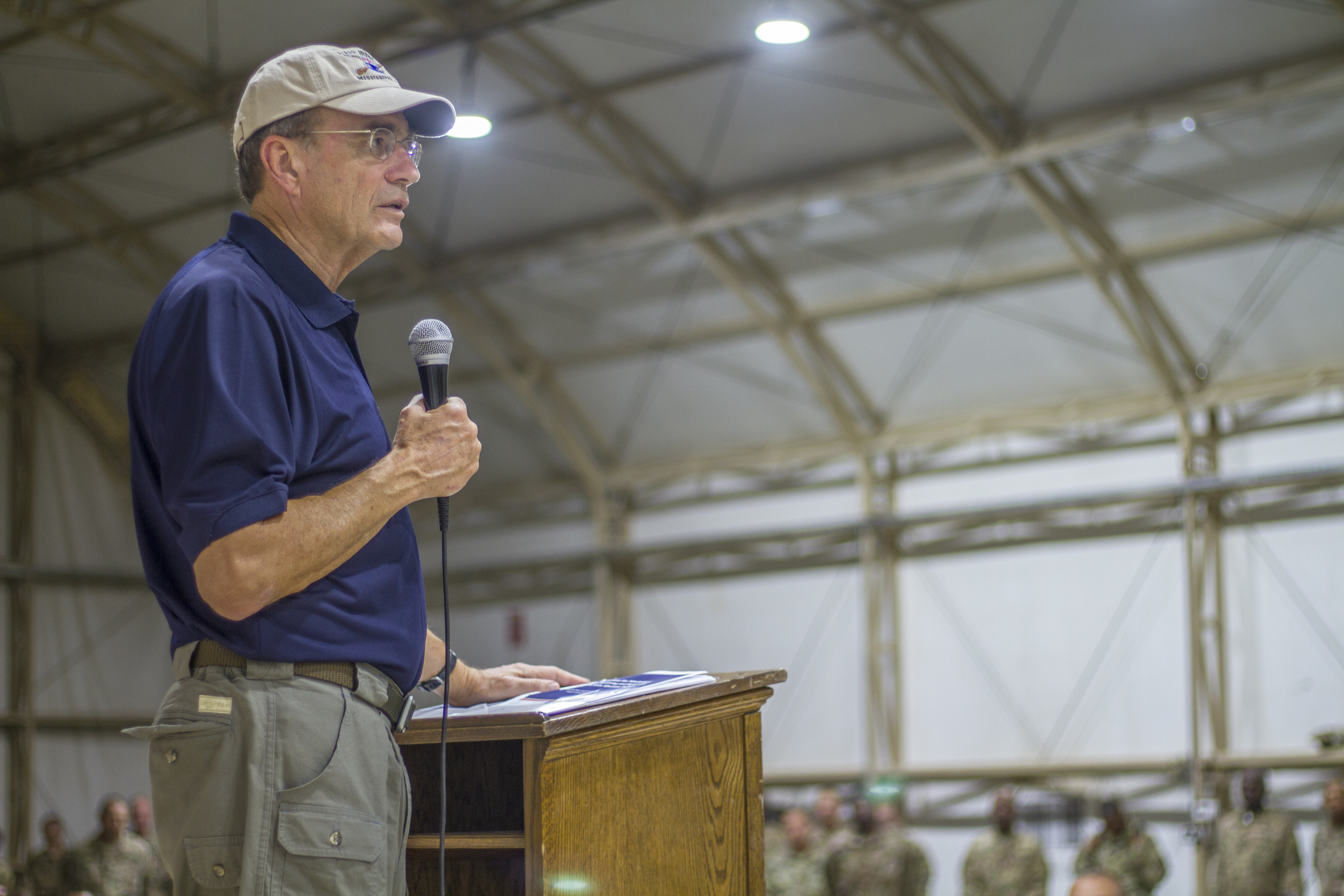
Hosemann discussing absentee voting with troops deployed in Kuwait, 2018

=== Elections ===
In the 2007 Mississippi elections, Hosemann ran for the Mississippi Secretary of State position to succeed Eric Clark. Political analyst Sid Salter noted Hosemann in May as one of the early leaders in the campaign. He campaigned on voter ID laws, better election administration, and fair management of public lands. One of Hosemann's campaign ads took advantage of his unusual name, which was considered by several staffers at the Clarion-Ledger as one of the best of 2007. In the primary election in August, he received 56% of the vote, besting former mayor of Columbus Jeffrey Rupp and State Representative Mike Lott of Petal. In the general election in November, Hosemann defeated Robert Smith with 58% of the vote. He became the first Republican Secretary of State for Mississippi since James Hill in 1878. He took office on January 10, 2008.

Hosemann ran for reelection in the 2011 Mississippi elections. He announced his intent in February 2011, focusing on implementing Mississippi's voter ID law. He easily won the Republican primary against a Gulfport city council member, who ran because of Hosemann's attempt to put harbor control under his office. In the primary, he reused his campaign commercials focusing on his unusual name. No Democrat ran against Hosemann, though the Reform party attempted to put a candidate on the ballot. In the end, he ran uncontested.

In February 2015, on Supertalk radio, Hosemann announced he would run for reelection in the 2015 Mississippi elections. He ran unopposed in the Republican primary and was set to face Democrat Charles Graham. An October poll by Mason-Dixon showed Hosemann to win 63% to 27%. He ended up winning against retired firefighter Graham 61% to 36%.

=== Tenure ===
Under Hosemann's tenure, he worked to enact voter ID laws. After Shelby County v. Holder in 2013, Mississippi was allowed to change its voting laws without preclearance from the Department of Justice. Following the decision, Hosemann quickly worked to implement regulations for voter ID after a 2011 vote to amend the state constitution passed, as it no longer needed DOJ preclearance. The law first took effect in the 2014 primary elections. In 2014, he won a federal court case to keep state voter file information private from the federal government. He asserted that there was no voter fraud in the 2016 election. In 2017, he refused the Trump administration's request to Mississippi's voting records to identify non-citizens voting.

The Mississippi Legislature officially ratified the 13th Amendment in 1995, but the Secretary of State's office failed to officially notify the National Archives at that time. The oversight was identified and reported to Hosemann in 2013, who quickly submitted the appropriate documentation, making Mississippi the final state to ratify the amendment.

In 2018, at the Neshoba County Fair, Hosemann announced he would not seek re-election for Secretary of State. In March 2018, he was considered a potential successor to U.S. Senator Thad Cochran after his resignation.

== Lieutenant Governor of Mississippi (2020–present) ==
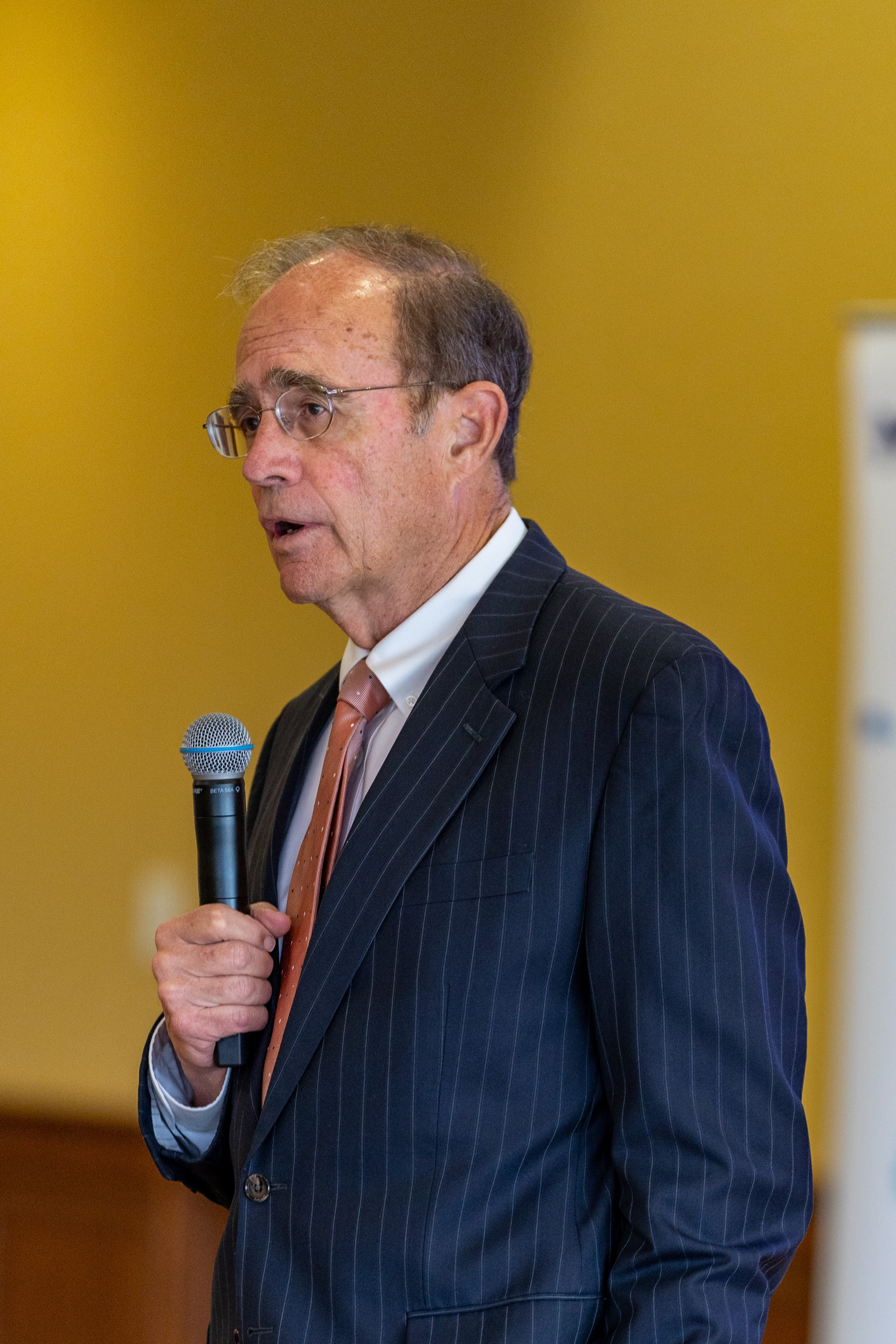
Delbert Hosemann at the Mississippi Cyber Initiative Summit in 2023

=== Elections ===
Hosemann announced his candidacy for lieutenant governor in the 2019 election. During the campaign, he focused on increasing teacher pay, more infrastructure funding, expanding Medicaid, and fully funding pre-K education. He also proposed gas tax increases and increasing legislative transparency. In the Republican primary, he defeated Shane Quick and won the Republican nomination for lieutenant governor; he outraised Quick by several magnitude. In the general election, Hosemann defeated Democrat Mississippi House Representative Jay Hughes 60% to 40%. He was sworn in to the office on January 14, 2020.

In the 2023 Mississippi elections, Hosemann ran for reelection. In his announcement, he emphasized the improved fiscal status of Mississippi. He faced a primary challenge from far-right firebrand state senator Chris McDaniel who lambasted Hosemann as being too liberal; McDaniel was considered a leader of the far-right wing of the Mississippi GOP. Hosemann's campaign focused on cutting taxes, improving government efficiency, adding more prosecutors to judicial districts, funding infrastructure projects, increasing education resources, and building regionalized healthcare networks; he also touted his "conservative values." Hosemann outraised McDaniel throughout the campaign despite McDaniel receiving over $1 million in dark money. While the race was considered contentious, Hosemann defeated McDaniel 52% to 43%. Hosemann faced Democratic opponent and political newcomer Ryan Grover in the general election and won 61% to 39%. He was sworn in on January 4, 2024.

=== Tenure ===
As Lieutenant Governor, Hosemann serves as the president of the Mississippi Senate and plays a significant role in whether legislation passes.

In his first term, he oversaw the largest teacher pay raise in the history of the state. In 2022, he oversaw the legislature passing the largest tax cut in state history. The legislature also passed legislation for a new school funding formula and a youth workforce development program. During discussions on whether to change the Mississippi Flag in 2020, he initially voiced support for it to be done through referendum, but later supported the Mississippi legislature changing it; the legislature later decided retired the flag. A resident of Jackson, Mississippi, he blamed the 2022 Jackson water crisis on city leadership and refused to commit to funding for fixing infrastructure. During the COVID-19 pandemic, he supported Mississippians getting vaccinated. Hosemann angered conservative senators when he gave 13 committee chairmanships to Democratic state senators, a decision based on the fact the Senate has 52 members with 41 committees.

In his second term, Hosemann has pushed for medicaid expansion, clashing with Governor Tate Reeves. He also advocated for ending the state income tax and reducing the state grocery tax for 2025 legislative priorities. In 2025, he unveiled a $326 million tax cut plan to reduce the state income tax and grocery tax, as well as raise the gas tax to pay for infrastructure improvements.

== Personal life ==
Hosemann married Lynn Hosemann (Lagen) in 1970, whom he met at the University of Notre Dame; together they have three children. He is Catholic.

He is a member of the National Rifle Association and Ducks Unlimited. He has completed the New York City Marathon and Boston Marathon.

During the COVID-19 pandemic, Hosemann tested positive for coronavirus. He tested positive again two years later during the opening days of the legislative session. On February 19, 2025, Hosemann collapsed while presiding over a session in the Mississippi State Senate from dehydration; he later recovered.

== Electoral history ==
Mississippi's 4th congressional district Republican primary, 1998
Party	Candidate	Votes	%
Republican	Delbert Hosemann, Jr.	6,967	21.04
Republican	Phil Davis	5,964	18.01
Republican	Art Rhodes	5,830	17.61
Republican	Dunn Lampton	4,826	14.57
Republican	Heath Hall	3,868	11.68
Republican	Ken Stribling	2,220	6.70
Republican	Doug Sullivan	2,160	6.52
Republican	Erik Hearon	1,054	3.18
Republican	Wilburn Fortinberry	226	0.68
Total votes		33,115	100.00

Mississippi's 4th congressional district Republican primary runoff, 1998
Party	Candidate	Votes	%
Republican	Delbert Hosemann, Jr.	14,889	55.99
Republican	Phil Davis	11,705	44.01
Total votes		26,594	100.00

Mississippi's 4th congressional district election, 1998
Party	Candidate	Votes	%
Democratic	Ronnie Shows	73,252	53.39
Republican	Delbert Hosemann, Jr.	61,551	44.86
Total votes		137,199	100.00
Democratic gain from Republican			

Mississippi Secretary of State Republican primary, 2007
Party	Candidate	Votes	%
Republican	Delbert Hosemann, Jr.	102,093	53.79
Republican	Mike Lott	64,879	34.18
Republican	Jeffrey Rupp	17,838	9.40
Republican	Gene Sills	4,982	2.62
Total votes		189,792	100.00

Mississippi Secretary of State election, 2007
Party	Candidate	Votes	%
Republican	Delbert Hosemann, Jr.	425,228	58.24
Democratic	Robert Smith	304,917	41.76
Total votes		730,145	100.00
Republican gain from Democratic			

Mississippi Secretary of State Republican primary, 2011
Party	Candidate	Votes	%
Republican	Delbert Hosemann, Jr. (incumbent)	231,077	83.36
Republican	Ricky Dombrowski	46,114	16.64
Total votes		277,191	100.00

Mississippi Secretary of State election, 2011
Party	Candidate	Votes	%
Republican	Delbert Hosemann, Jr. (incumbent)	719,734	100.00
Total votes		719,734	100.00
Republican hold			

Mississippi Secretary of State Republican primary, 2015
Party	Candidate	Votes	%
Republican	Delbert Hosemann, Jr. (incumbent)	224,823	100.00
Total votes		224,823	100.00

Mississippi Secretary of State election, 2015
Party	Candidate	Votes	%
Republican	Delbert Hosemann, Jr. (incumbent)	440,048	61.29
Democratic	Charles Graham	256,689	35.75
Reform	Randy Walker	21,260	2.96
Total votes		717,997	100.00
Republican hold			

Mississippi Lieutenant Gubernatorial Republican primary, 2019
Party	Candidate	Votes	%
Republican	Delbert Hosemann, Jr.	311,518	85.77
Republican	Shane Quick	51,703	14.23
Total votes		363,221	100.00

Mississippi Lieutenant Gubernatorial election, 2019
Party	Candidate	Votes	%
Republican	Delbert Hosemann, Jr.	524,757	60.01
Democratic	Jay Hughes	349,627	39.99
Total votes		874,384	100.00
Republican hold			

Mississippi Lieutenant Gubernatorial Republican primary, 2023
Party	Candidate	Votes	%
Republican	Delbert Hosemann, Jr. (incumbent)	198,979	52.11%
Republican	Chris McDaniel	162,708	42.61%
Republican	Tiffany Longino	20,143	5.28%
Total votes		381,830	100.00%

Mississippi Lieutenant Gubernatorial election, 2023
Party	Candidate	Votes	%
Republican	Delbert Hosemann, Jr. (incumbent)	490,956	60.74
Democratic	Ryan Grover	317,347	39.26
Total votes		808,303	100.00
Republican hold			

Party political offices
Preceded by Julio Del Castillo	Republican nominee for Secretary of State of Mississippi; 2007, 2011, 2015	Succeeded by Michael Watson
Preceded by Tate Reeves	Republican nominee for Lieutenant Governor of Mississippi; 2019, 2023	Most recent
Political offices
Preceded by Eric Clark	Secretary of State of Mississippi; 2008–2020	Succeeded by Michael Watson
Preceded by Tate Reeves	Lieutenant Governor of Mississippi; 2020–present	Incumbent
