= J. P. Hughes Jr. =

American politician (born 1963)

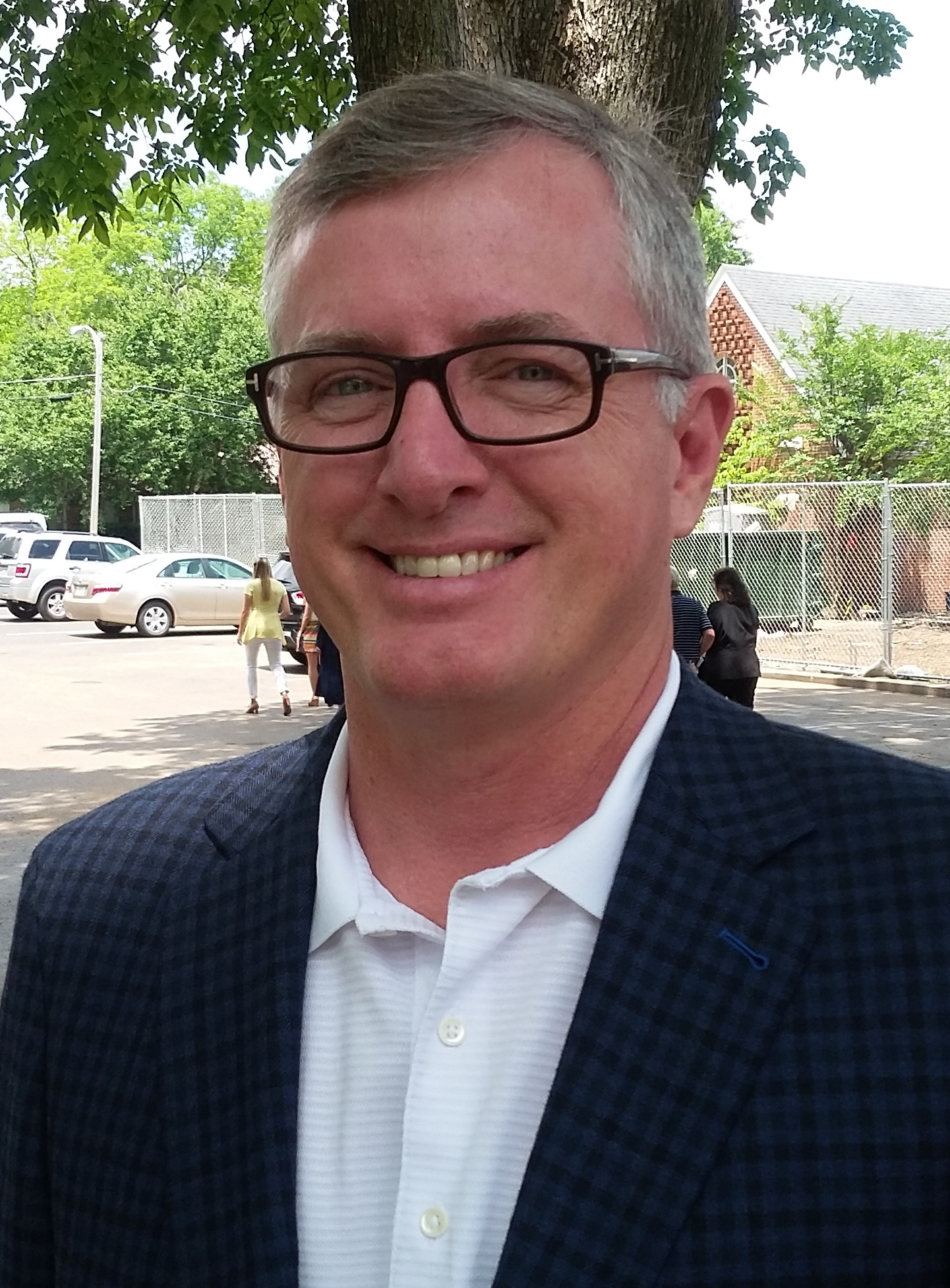

Member of the Mississippi House of Representatives from the 12th district
- In office January 5, 2016 – January 7, 2020
- Preceded by: Brad Mayo
- Succeeded by: Clay Deweese

Personal details
- Born: August 28, 1963 (age 63) Houston, Texas, U.S.
- Party: Democratic
- Spouse: Cris Moroney
- Children: 1
- Education: Nicholls State University (BA); University of Mississippi (JD)
- Website: Campaign website

Military service
- Allegiance: United States
- Branch/service: United States Army
- Years of service: 1981–1984 (Active); 1984–1988 (Reserve)
- Unit: 1st Cavalry Division

J. P. "Jay" Hughes Jr. (born August 28, 1963) is an American politician. A member of the Democratic Party, he was a member of the Mississippi House of Representatives from the 12th District for four years, being first elected in 2015.

== Career ==
Hughes was born in Houston, Texas and earned a bachelor's degree in Business and Economics at Nicholls State University in Thibodaux, Louisiana. Hughes is a 1991 graduate of the University of Mississippi School of Law, and a practicing attorney in Oxford, Mississippi.

Hughes served in the US Army from 1981-1984 and served in the Army Reserves from 1984-1988. He is an expert marksman and served at Ft. Jackson in South Carolina, Ft. Gordon in Georgia and Ft. Hood in Texas, as well as temporary duty in Michigan, England, France and Germany.

In 2013, Hughes began his political career when he was elected to Alderman of Ward 1 of Oxford, Mississippi, defeating Ney Williams. Hughes campaigned on issues of streamlined decision making for the Oxford Board of Aldermen, responsible growth, and better partnerships between the City of Oxford and University of Mississippi.

Hughes was elected to the Mississippi House of Representatives on November 3, 2015 when he defeated Republican Brad Mayo with 55.1% of the vote. Hughes donated his Alderman and Legislative session salaries to his local school districts and also volunteers as a substitute teacher in order to learn more about the troubles and issues public school teachers and students face.

He and his wife were jointly awarded 2012 Oxford School District Citizen of the Year.

On May 3, 2018 Hughes announced his candidacy for lieutenant governor in 2019. He lost to the Republican challenger.

=== 2016 legislative session ===
Hughes served on Judiciary A; Judiciary En Banc; Medicaid; Accountability, Efficiency & Transparency; and Constitution committees. The House introduced 1,789 bills, and 376 became law. Hughes supported the maintenance of state roads and bridges, and a campaign finance and ethics reform measure.

=== 2017 legislative session ===
Hughes again served on Judiciary A; Judiciary En Banc; Medicaid; Accountability, Efficiency & Transparency; and Constitution committees.

Party political offices
Preceded by Tim Johnson	Democratic nominee for Lieutenant Governor of Mississippi; 2019	Succeeded by D. Ryan Grover
