= Mississippi Republican Party =

Mississippi affiliate of the Republican Party

- Chairperson: D. Michael Hurst Jr.
- House leader: Jason White
- Senate leader: Delbert Hosemann
- Founded: 1956
- Headquarters: P.O. Box 60, Jackson, Mississippi 39205
- Ideology: Conservatism
- National affiliation: Republican Party
- Colors: Red
- Seats in the United States Senate: 2 / 2
- Seats in the United States House of Representatives: 3 / 4
- Seats in the Mississippi Senate: 36 / 52
- Seats in the Mississippi House of Representatives: 76 / 122

Election symbol

Website
- www.msgop.org

The Mississippi Republican Party is the Mississippi state affiliate of the United States Republican Party. The party chairman is D. Michael Hurst Jr., and the party is based in Jackson, Mississippi. The original Republican Party of Mississippi was founded following the American Civil War, and the current incarnation of the Mississippi Republican Party was founded in 1956. The party would grow in popularity after the 1964 Civil Rights Act and is currently the dominant party in the state.

== History ==
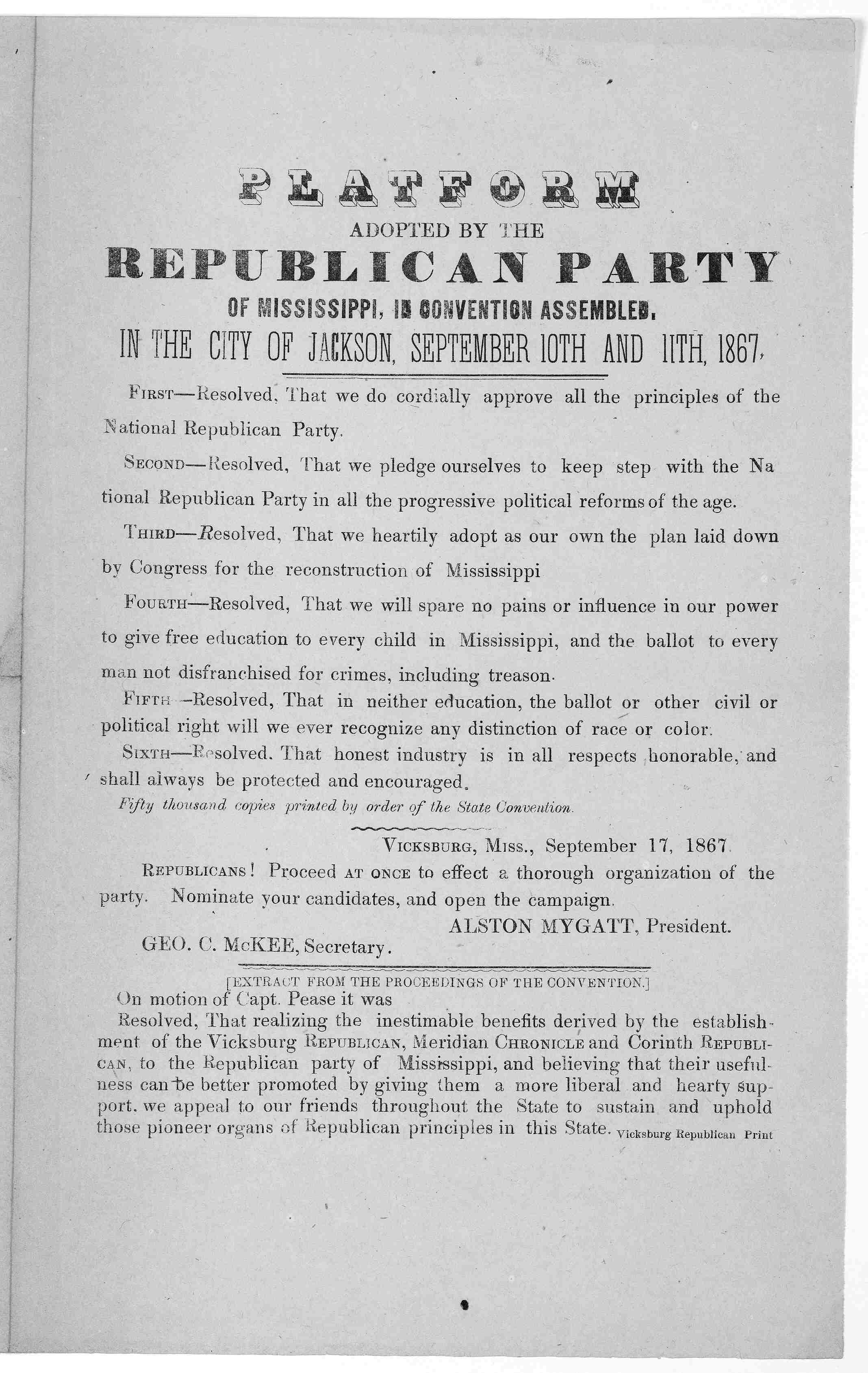
Platform adopted by the Republican party of Mississippi, in convention assembled, in the City of Jackson, September 10–11, 1867

One-third of the delegates to the 1867 convention were black. James D. Lynch opposed the Radical Republicans and resolutions calling for property confiscation.

In 1956, Wirt Adams Yerger, Jr., an insurance agent from Jackson, founded the modern Mississippi Republican Party and served as the first state chairman from 1956 until 1966. He was chairman of the Mississippi delegation to the Republican National Convention in 1956, 1960, and 1964. He was elected to a four-year term as chairman of the Southern Association of Republican State Chairman in 1960. In 2009, the central committee of the Mississippi Republican Party named Yerger Chairman Emeritus. The Mississippi Republican Party would grow in supporters with then President Dwight D. Eisenhower, who still twice lost the electoral votes of Mississippi. On September 24, 1960, Republican presidential candidate Richard Nixon campaigned in the state, the first time a presidential candidate had appeared in the state in more than a century. During the 1964 Republican National Convention Mississippi delegates would help nominate Barry Goldwater for president. Goldwater would go on to win 87 percent of the vote in Mississippi in the 1964 presidential election, the first time a Republican would win the state since the Reconstruction Era. Only once since 1956 has a non-Republican presidential candidate won the state of Mississippi, Jimmy Carter in the 1976 presidential election. In 1988, Republican Congressman Trent Lott would defeat Democratic Congressman Wayne Dowdy to replace retiring Senator John Stennis (D-MS).

== Gubernatorial elections ==
In 1963, Rubel Phillips became the first Republican nominee for governor in 80 years, challenging then-Lt. Gov. Paul Johnson, Jr. and garnering 38 percent of the vote. Phillips ran again in 1967 against John Bell Williams but lost again, this time earning 29 percent of the vote. In 1991, for the first time in over a century a Republican would become the Governor of Mississippi, when Kirk Fordice would earn 50.8 percent of the popular vote, defeating Democrat Ray Mabus. In the 2003 Mississippi Gubernatorial Election, Haley Barbour defeated then incumbent Democrat Ronnie Musgrove with 52.59% of the vote. On November 5, 2019, Tate Reeves was elected Governor of Mississippi and assumed office in January 2020.

== Policy positions ==
While Mississippi Republicans take positions on a wide variety of issues, some of the noteworthy ones include:

- Abortion - "Protecting and securing the 'life, liberty, and property' of Mississippians begins first with guarding the life of the unborn child. Our policies should honor the sanctity of innocent human life." In November 2011, Governor Haley Barbour voted for Mississippi Initiative 26. Initiative #26 would amend the Mississippi Constitution to define the word "person" or "persons", as those terms are used in Article III of the state constitution, to include every human being from the moment of fertilization, cloning, or the functional equivalent thereof.
- Voting rights - In January 2009, Republican Senator Joey Fillingane put forward Mississippi Initiative 27 which would amend the Mississippi Constitution to require voters to submit a government issued photo identification before being allowed to vote. This initiative passed on November 8, 2011.
- Private property - Republican Party members supported Mississippi Initiative 31 on the topic of eminent domain. Initiative #31 would amend the Mississippi Constitution to prohibit state and local government from taking private property by eminent domain and then conveying it to other persons or private businesses for a period of 10 years after acquisition.

== Current Republican officeholders ==
The Mississippi Republican Party hold all the eight statewide offices and holds a majority in the Mississippi Senate. Republicans also hold both of the state's U.S. Senate seats and 3 of the state's 4 U.S. House seats.

=== Members of Congress ===
==== U.S. Senate ====
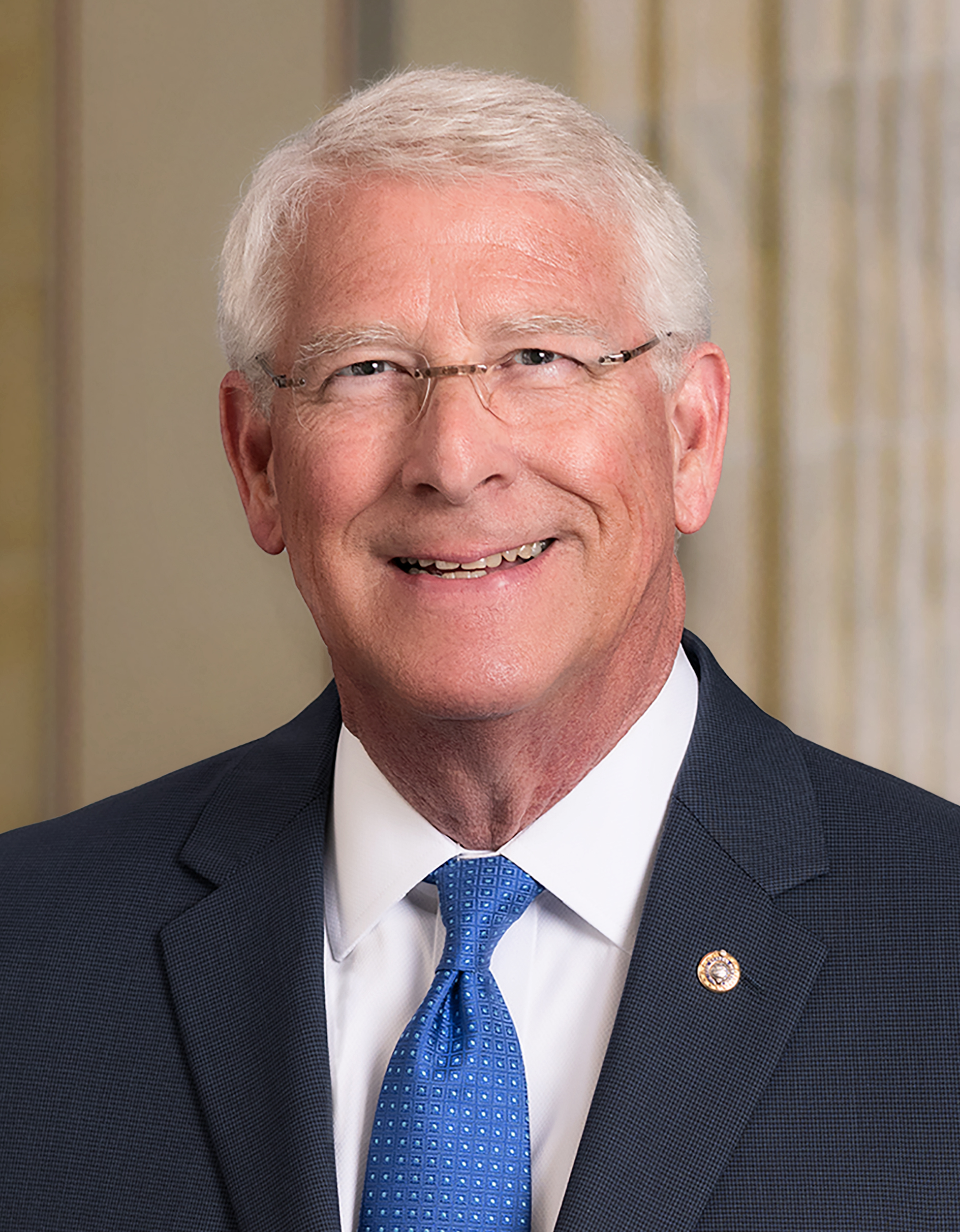
Senior U.S. Senator Roger Wicker

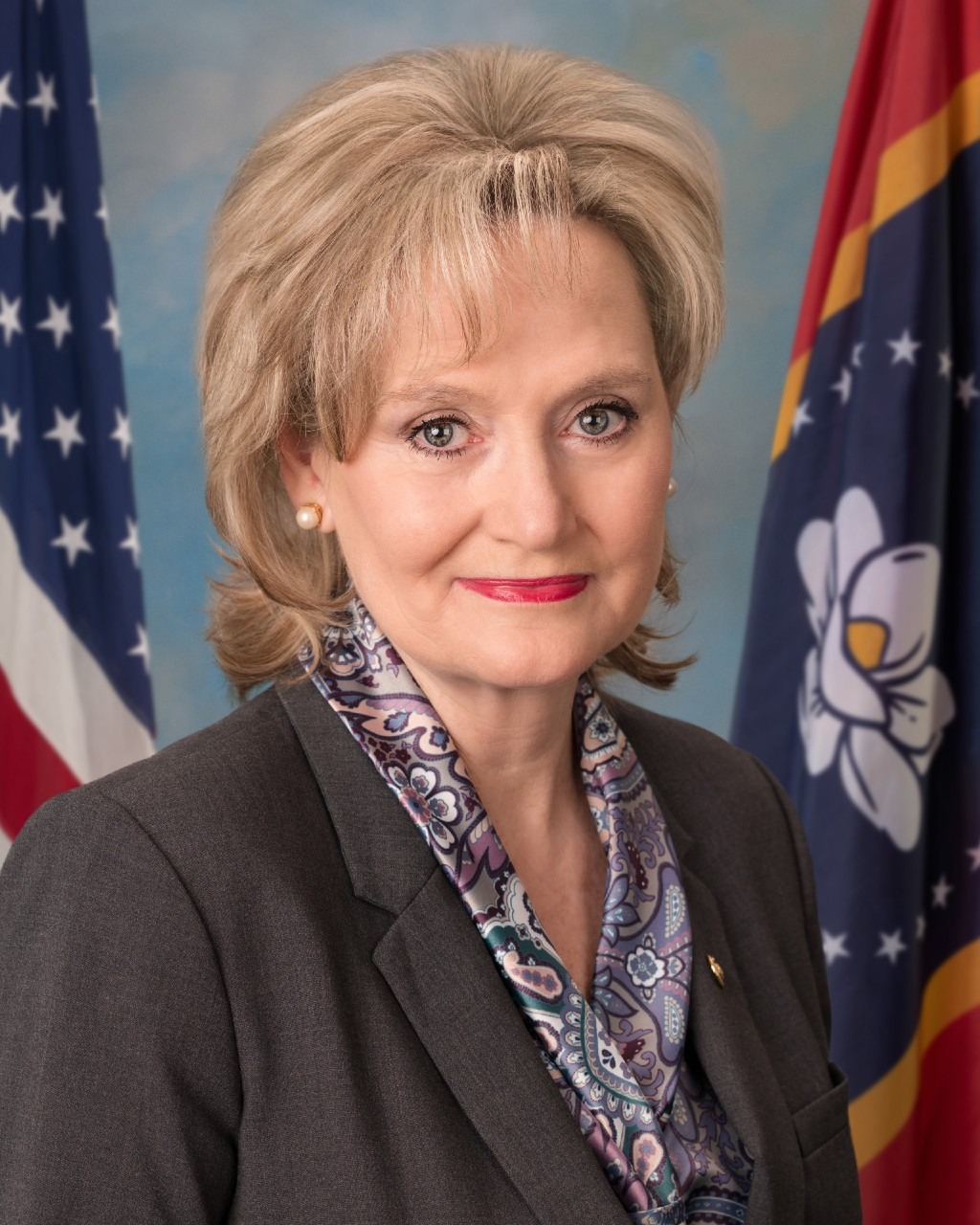
Junior U.S. Senator Cindy Hyde-Smith

==== U.S. House of Representatives ====
District	Member	Photo
1st	Trent Kelly	
3rd	Michael Guest	
4th	Mike Ezell	

=== Statewide offices ===
Office	Member	Photo
Governor	Tate Reeves	
Lieutenant Governor	Delbert Hosemann	
Attorney General	Lynn Fitch	
Secretary of State	Michael Watson	
State Auditor	Shad White	
State Treasurer	David McRae	
Commissioner of Agriculture and Commerce	Andy Gipson	
Commissioner of Insurance	Mike Chaney	

=== State Legislative Leadership ===
Office	Member
President of the Senate	Delbert Hosemann
Speaker of the House	Jason White

==== Mayors ====
Locality	Mayor
Gulfport	Billy Hewes
Southaven	Darren Musselwhite
Biloxi	Andrew “Fofo” Gilitch
Olive Branch	Ken Adams
Tupelo	Todd Jordan

== Mississippi State Republican chairmen ==
- Wirt Yerger, 1956–1966
- Clarke Reed, 1966–1976
- Charles W. Pickering, 1976–1978
- Michael Retzer, 1978–1982; 1996–2001
- Evelyn McPhail, 1987–1992
- Jim Herring, 2001–2008
- Brad White, 2008–2011
- Arnie Hederman, 2011
- Joe Nosef, 2012–2017
- Lucien Smith, 2017–2020
- Frank Bordeaux, 2020–2024
- D Michael Hurst Jr., 2024–present

== Electoral history ==
=== Gubernatorial ===
Mississippi Republican Party gubernatorial election results
Election	Gubernatorial candidate	Votes	Vote %	Result
1999	Michael Parker	370,691	48.52%	Lost ✗
2003	Haley Barbour	470,404	52.59%	Won ✓
2007	Haley Barbour	430,807	57.90%	Won ✓
2011	Phil Bryant	544,851	60.98%	Won ✓
2015	Phil Bryant	480,399	66.24%	Won ✓
2019	Tate Reeves	459,396	51.91%	Won ✓
2023	Tate Reeves	418,233	50.94%	Won ✓

== See also ==
- Mississippi Democratic Party
- Lewis McAllister, first Republican member of the Mississippi House of Representatives since Reconstruction, 1963–1968, from Meridian
- Seelig Wise, first Republican state senator since Reconstruction, served 1964–1968 (Coahoma, Tunica, and Quitman counties)

== Works cited ==
- Abbott, Richard (1986). The Republican Party and the South, 1855-1877: The First Southern Strategy. University of North Carolina Press. ISBN 0807816809.
