= 2008 United States Senate election in Mississippi =

- November 4, 2008
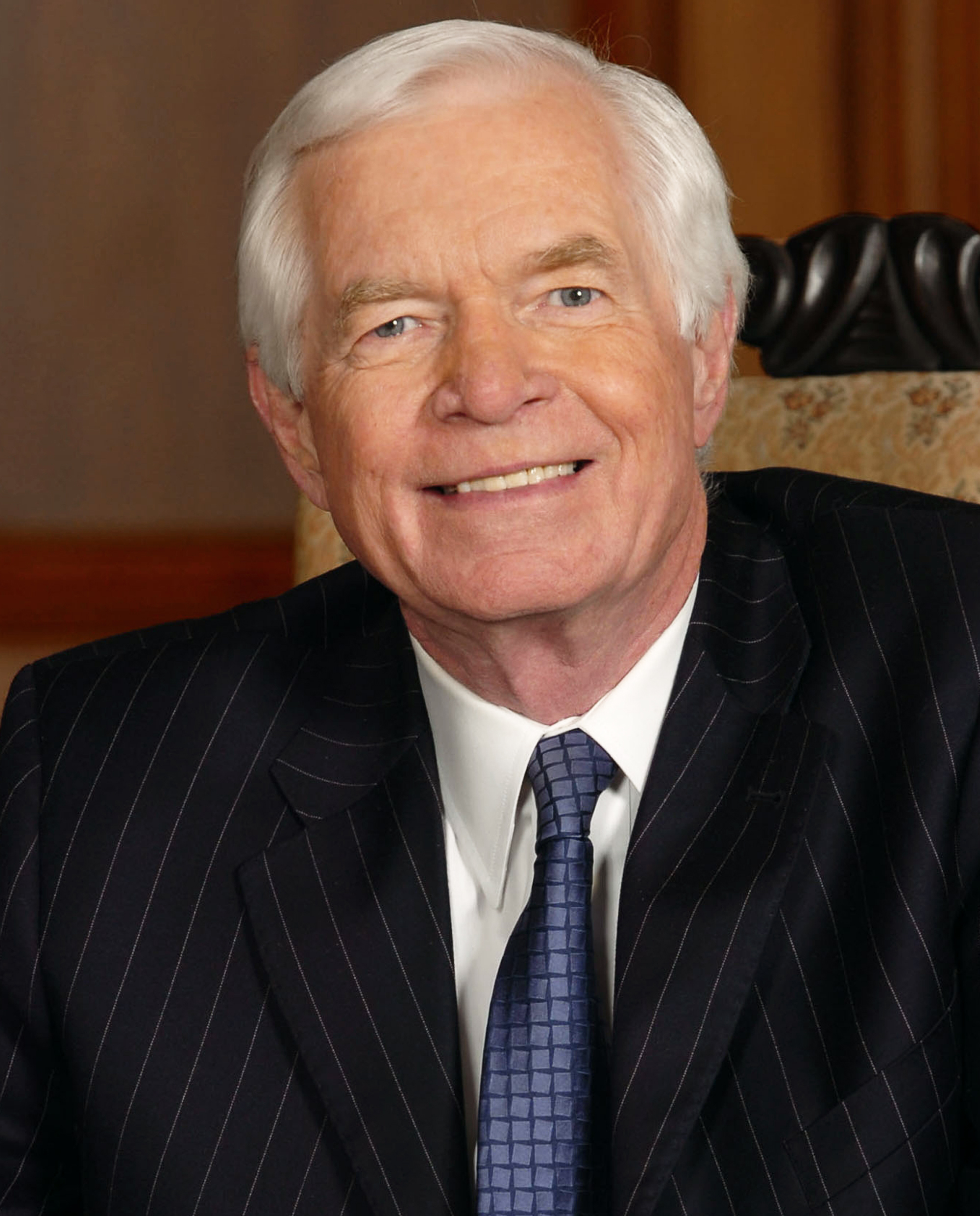

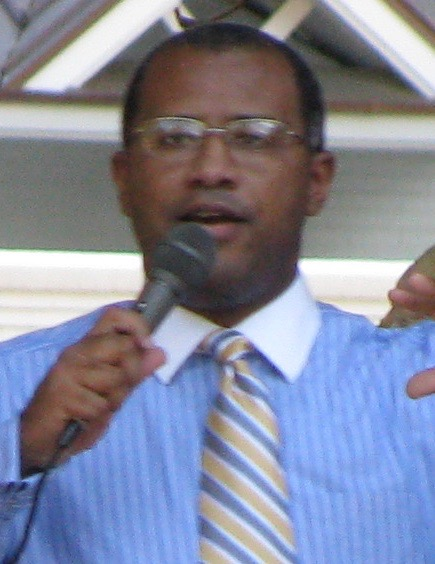
Nominee	Thad Cochran	Erik Fleming
Party	Republican	Democratic
Popular vote	766,111	480,915
Percentage	61.44%	38.56%
- Cochran: 50–60% 60–70% 70–80% 80–90% >90% Fleming: 50–60% 60–70% 70–80% 80–90% >90%
U.S. senator before election
Thad Cochran
Republican
Elected U.S. Senator
Thad Cochran
Republican

The 2008 United States Senate election in Mississippi was held on November 4, 2008, to elect a member of the United States Senate to represent the state of Mississippi. Republican incumbent Thad Cochran won re-election to a sixth term, defeating Democratic state representative Erik Fleming.

== Republican primary ==
=== Candidates ===
==== Nominee ====
- Thad Cochran, incumbent U.S. senator

== Democratic primary ==
=== Candidates ===
==== Nominee ====
- Erik R. Fleming, former HD-72, and nominee for U.S. senate in 2006

==== Eliminated in primary ====
- Shawn O'Hara

== General election ==
=== Predictions ===
Source	Ranking	As of
The Cook Political Report	Safe R	October 23, 2008
CQ Politics	Safe R	October 31, 2008
Rothenberg Political Report	Safe R	November 2, 2008
Real Clear Politics	Safe R	November 4, 2008

=== Fundraising ===
Campaign finance reports as of December 31, 2008
Candidate	Raised	Spent	Cash on hand
Thad Cochran (R)	$2,723,398	$2,832,197	$495,925
Erik Fleming (D)	$0	$0	$0
Source: Federal Election Commission

=== Polling ===
Poll source	Date(s) administered	Sample size (Note: Key: A – all adults RV – registered voters LV – likely voters V – unclear)	Margin of error	Thad Cochran (R)	Erik Fleming (D)	Other	Undecided
Rasmussen Reports	June 24, 2008	500 (LV)	± 4.5%	59%	32%	–	9%
Rasmussen Reports	May 27, 2008	500 (LV)	± 4.0%	58%	35%	1%	5%

== Results ==
2008 United States Senate election in Mississippi
Party	Candidate	Votes	%
Republican	Thad Cochran (incumbent)	766,111	61.44%
Democratic	Erik Fleming	480,915	38.56%
Total votes		1,247,026	100.00%
Republican hold			

=== By county ===
County	Thad Cochran Republican		Erik Fleming Democratic		Margin		Total
County	#	%	#	%	#	%	Total
Adams	6,967	46.69%	7,954	53.31%	-987	-6.61%	14,921
Alcorn	10,275	70.44%	4,311	29.56%	5,964	40.89%	14,586
Amite	4,269	58.06%	3,084	41.94%	1,185	16.12%	7,353
Attala	5,466	61.26%	3,457	38.74%	2,009	22.51%	8,923
Benton	2,408	55.59%	1,924	44.41%	484	11.17%	4,332
Bolivar	5,756	40.30%	8,527	59.70%	-2,771	-19.40%	14,283
Calhoun	4,555	66.53%	2,292	33.47%	2,263	33.05%	6,847
Carroll	3,991	68.80%	1,810	31.20%	2,181	37.60%	5,801
Chickasaw	4,512	52.13%	4,143	47.87%	369	4.26%	8,655
Choctaw	2,715	68.58%	1,244	31.42%	1,471	37.16%	3,959
Claiborne	964	18.24%	4,320	81.76%	-3,356	-63.51%	5,284
Clarke	5,242	64.02%	2,946	35.98%	2,296	28.04%	8,188
Clay	4,772	44.63%	5,921	55.37%	-1,149	-10.75%	10,693
Coahoma	3,559	36.35%	6,233	63.65%	-2,674	-27.31%	9,792
Copiah	7,063	50.39%	6,953	49.61%	110	0.78%	14,016
Covington	5,758	62.42%	3,467	37.58%	2,291	24.83%	9,225
DeSoto	44,834	71.58%	17,798	28.42%	27,036	43.17%	62,632
Forrest	16,926	64.45%	9,335	35.55%	7,591	28.91%	26,261
Franklin	2,940	64.39%	1,626	35.61%	1,314	28.78%	4,566
George	7,731	84.86%	1,379	15.14%	6,352	69.73%	9,110
Greene	4,291	75.48%	1,394	24.52%	2,897	50.96%	5,685
Grenada	6,431	59.08%	4,454	40.92%	1,977	18.16%	10,885
Hancock	13,262	80.60%	3,193	19.40%	10,069	61.19%	16,455
Harrison	43,275	71.06%	17,625	28.94%	25,650	42.12%	60,900
Hinds	39,431	37.70%	65,157	62.30%	-25,726	-24.60%	104,588
Holmes	2,145	23.72%	6,898	76.28%	-4,753	-52.56%	9,043
Humphreys	1,690	34.77%	3,170	65.23%	-1,480	-30.45%	4,860
Issaquena	397	44.41%	497	55.59%	-100	-11.19%	894
Itawamba	7,602	78.40%	2,095	21.60%	5,507	56.79%	9,697
Jackson	38,961	73.88%	13,776	26.12%	25,185	47.76%	52,737
Jasper	4,281	47.58%	4,716	52.42%	-435	-4.83%	8,997
Jefferson	753	17.35%	3,588	82.65%	-2,835	-65.31%	4,341
Jefferson Davis	3,088	43.33%	4,038	56.67%	-950	-13.33%	7,126
Jones	21,049	73.40%	7,628	26.60%	13,421	46.80%	28,677
Kemper	2,171	43.10%	2,866	56.90%	-695	-13.80%	5,037
Lafayette	11,826	65.86%	6,130	34.14%	5,696	31.72%	17,956
Lamar	19,384	82.67%	4,064	17.33%	15,320	65.34%	23,448
Lauderdale	20,679	64.82%	11,225	35.18%	9,454	29.63%	31,904
Lawrence	4,428	64.77%	2,408	35.23%	2,020	29.55%	6,836
Leake	5,466	60.27%	3,603	39.73%	1,863	20.54%	9,069
Lee	23,736	69.71%	10,316	30.29%	13,420	39.41%	34,052
Leflore	4,562	36.89%	7,803	63.11%	-3,241	-26.21%	12,365
Lincoln	10,994	68.19%	5,129	31.81%	5,865	36.38%	16,123
Lowndes	14,966	56.89%	11,340	43.11%	3,626	13.78%	26,306
Madison	29,402	63.78%	16,698	36.22%	12,704	27.56%	46,100
Marion	8,640	68.01%	4,064	31.99%	4,576	36.02%	12,704
Marshall	7,032	45.46%	8,435	54.54%	-1,403	-9.07%	15,467
Monroe	10,478	61.83%	6,469	38.17%	4,009	23.66%	16,947
Montgomery	3,174	57.45%	2,351	42.55%	823	14.90%	5,525
Neshoba	8,527	76.36%	2,640	23.64%	5,887	52.72%	11,167
Newton	6,820	71.02%	2,783	28.98%	4,037	42.04%	9,603
Noxubee	1,683	26.98%	4,554	73.02%	-2,871	-46.03%	6,237
Oktibbeha	10,466	57.99%	7,583	42.01%	2,883	15.97%	18,049
Panola	8,137	51.98%	7,518	48.02%	619	3.95%	15,655
Pearl River	17,298	80.36%	4,227	19.64%	13,071	60.72%	21,525
Perry	4,233	77.23%	1,248	22.77%	2,985	54.46%	5,481
Pike	9,103	51.73%	8,493	48.27%	610	3.47%	17,596
Pontotoc	9,862	78.67%	2,674	21.33%	7,188	57.34%	12,536
Prentiss	7,504	71.30%	3,020	28.70%	4,484	42.61%	10,524
Quitman	1,541	39.94%	2,317	60.06%	-776	-20.11%	3,858
Rankin	49,993	80.76%	11,908	19.24%	38,085	61.53%	61,901
Scott	6,748	59.68%	4,559	40.32%	2,189	19.36%	11,307
Sharkey	962	36.65%	1,663	63.35%	-701	-26.70%	2,625
Simpson	7,915	64.91%	4,279	35.09%	3,636	29.82%	12,194
Smith	6,369	78.30%	1,765	21.70%	4,604	56.60%	8,134
Stone	5,390	76.99%	1,611	23.01%	3,779	53.98%	7,001
Sunflower	3,906	36.55%	6,780	63.45%	-2,874	-26.90%	10,686
Tallahatchie	3,092	46.87%	3,505	53.13%	-413	-6.26%	6,597
Tate	7,869	64.54%	4,324	35.46%	3,545	29.07%	12,193
Tippah	6,963	73.62%	2,495	26.38%	4,468	47.24%	9,458
Tishomingo	6,022	74.52%	2,059	25.48%	3,963	49.04%	8,081
Tunica	1,225	30.97%	2,731	69.03%	-1,506	-38.07%	3,956
Union	9,242	77.62%	2,664	22.38%	6,578	55.25%	11,906
Walthall	4,348	58.07%	3,140	41.93%	1,208	16.13%	7,488
Warren	12,183	57.68%	8,939	42.32%	3,244	15.36%	21,122
Washington	7,187	38.55%	11,457	61.45%	-4,270	-22.90%	18,644
Wayne	6,215	63.95%	3,504	36.05%	2,711	27.89%	9,719
Webster	4,139	77.89%	1,175	22.11%	2,964	55.78%	5,314
Wilkinson	1,735	36.34%	3,039	63.66%	-1,304	-27.31%	4,774
Winston	5,740	57.60%	4,225	42.40%	1,515	15.20%	9,965
Yalobusha	3,870	58.25%	2,774	41.75%	1,096	16.50%	6,644
Yazoo	5,527	50.54%	5,408	49.46%	119	1.09%	10,935
Totals	766,111	61.44%	480,915	38.56%	285,196	22.87%	1,247,026

==== Counties that flipped from Republican to Democratic ====
- Tunica (Largest city: Tunica)
- Coahoma (Largest city: Clarksdale)
- Tallahatchie (Largest city: Charleston)
- Quitman (Largest city: Lambert)
- Sharkey (Largest city: Rolling Fork)
- Issaquena (Largest city: Mayersville)
- Clay (Largest city: West Point)
- Marshall (Largest city: Holly Springs)
- Noxubee (Largest city: Macon)
- Kemper (Largest city: De Kalb)
- Jasper (Largest city: Bay Springs)
- Jefferson Davis (Largest city: Prentiss)
- Adams (Largest city: Natchez)
- Wilkinson (Largest city: Centreville)
- Hinds (largest municipality: Jackson)
- Jefferson (largest municipality: Fayette)
- Claiborne (largest municipality: Port Gibson)
- Washington (Largest city: Greenville)
- Humphreys (Largest city: Belzoni)
- Holmes (Largest city: Durant)
- Bolivar (Largest city: Cleveland)
- Sunflower (Largest city: Indianola)
- LeFlore (Largest city: Greenwood)

County Flips: Democratic Flip / Republican Hold

=== By congressional district ===
Cochran won three of four congressional districts, including two that elected Democrats.

District	Cochran	Fleming	Representative
1st	64%	36%	Travis Childers
2nd	40%	60%	Bennie Thompson
3rd	66%	34%	Chip Pickering (110th Congress)
3rd	66%	34%	Gregg Harper (111th Congress)
4th	73%	27%	Gene Taylor

== See also ==
- 2008 United States elections
- 2008 United States House of Representatives elections in Mississippi
