= Thad Cochran =

American attorney and politician (1937–2019)

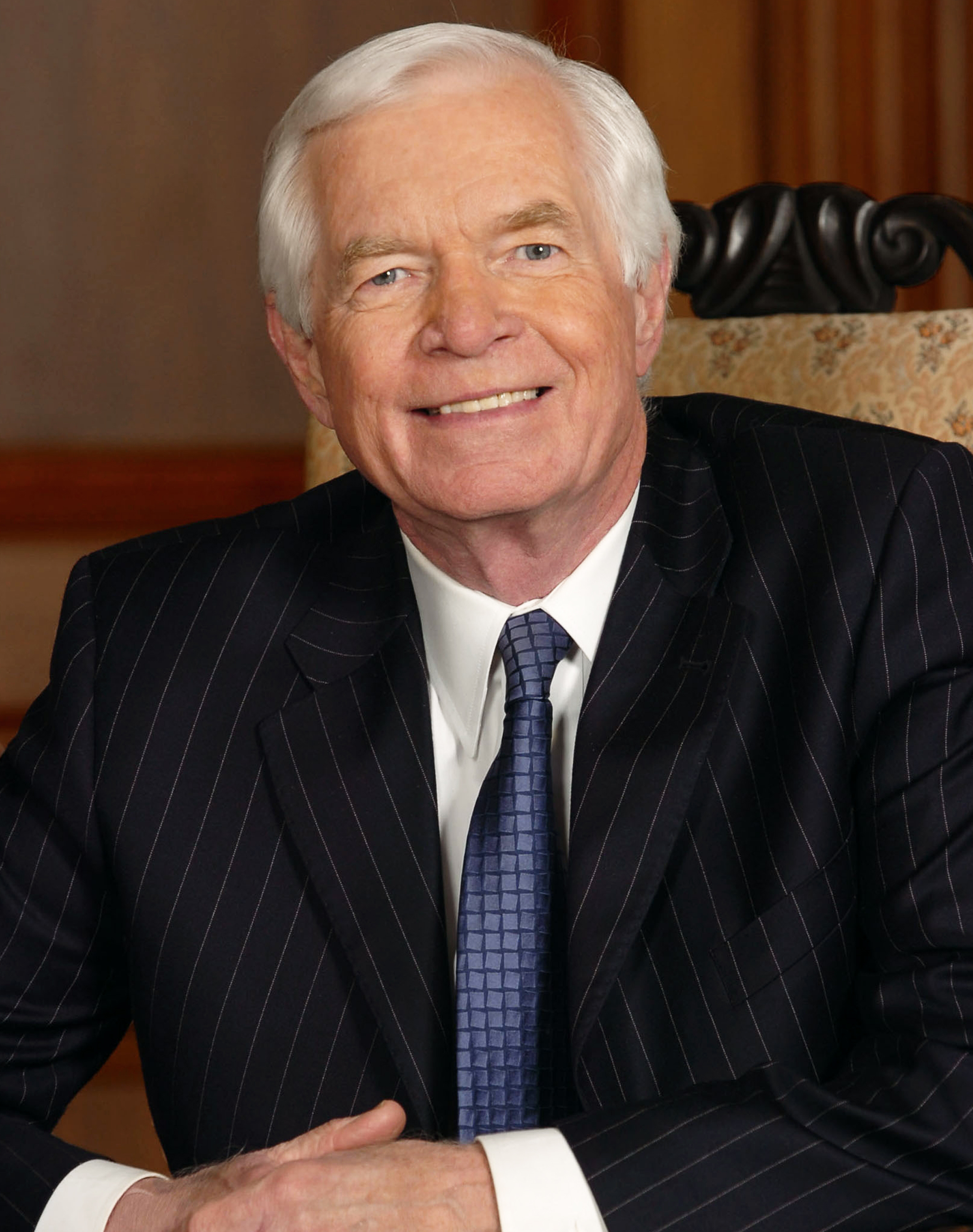
- Official portrait, 2007

United States Senator from Mississippi
- In office December 27, 1978 – April 1, 2018
- Preceded by: James Eastland
- Succeeded by: Cindy Hyde-Smith
Senate positions
Chair of the Senate Appropriations Committee
In office January 3, 2015 – April 1, 2018
Preceded by	Barbara Mikulski
Succeeded by	Richard Shelby
In office January 3, 2005 – January 3, 2007
Preceded by	Ted Stevens
Succeeded by	Robert Byrd
Chair of the Senate Agriculture Committee
In office January 3, 2003 – January 3, 2005
Preceded by	Tom Harkin
Succeeded by	Saxby Chambliss
Chair of the Senate Republican Conference
In office January 3, 1991 – January 3, 1997
Leader	Bob Dole; Trent Lott
Preceded by	John Chafee
Succeeded by	Connie Mack III
Vice Chair of the Senate Republican Conference
In office January 3, 1985 – January 3, 1991
Leader	Bob Dole
Preceded by	Jake Garn
Succeeded by	Bob Kasten

Member of the U.S. House of Representatives from Mississippi's 4th district
- In office January 3, 1973 – December 26, 1978
- Preceded by: Charles H. Griffin (redistricting)
- Succeeded by: Jon Hinson

Personal details
- Born: William Thad Cochran; December 7, 1937 Pontotoc, Mississippi, U.S.
- Died: May 30, 2019 (aged 81) Oxford, Mississippi, U.S.
- Party: Republican
- Spouses: Rose Clayton (m. 1964; died 2014) Kay Webber (m. 2015)
- Children: 2
- Education: University of Mississippi (BA, JD)
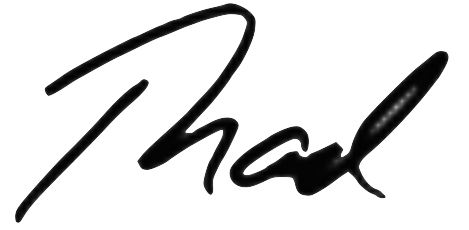
- Signature

Military service
- Allegiance: United States
- Branch/service: United States Navy
- Years of service: 1959–1961
- Rank: Ensign
- Cochran's voice Cochran opens a Senate Appropriations Committee hearing on funding for Gulf Coast recovery after Hurricane Katrina and Wilma; Recorded March 8, 2006

William Thad Cochran (/ˈkɒkrən/ KOK-rən; December 7, 1937 – May 30, 2019) was an American attorney and politician who served as a United States senator for Mississippi from 1978 to 2018. A Republican, he previously served in the U.S. House of Representatives from 1973 to 1978.

Born in Pontotoc, Mississippi, Cochran graduated from the University of Mississippi. He served in the United States Navy as an ensign (1959–1961) before graduating from the University of Mississippi School of Law. After practicing law for several years in Jackson, Mississippi, he was elected to the U.S. House of Representatives in 1972. He served three terms in the House representing Jackson and portions of southwest Mississippi.

Cochran won a three-way race for U.S. Senate in 1978, becoming the first Republican to win a United States Senate election in Mississippi since Blanche Bruce was elected during Reconstruction. He was re-elected to six terms by wide margins. He was chairman of the Senate Appropriations Committee from 2005 to 2007 and again from 2015 to 2018. He also chaired the Senate Agriculture Committee from 2003 to 2005. With over 45 years of combined House and Senate service, Cochran is the second longest-serving member of Congress ever from Mississippi, only after former Democratic U.S. Representative Jamie L. Whitten.

Cochran resigned from the Senate due to health issues in April 2018. Cochran died on May 30, 2019, in Oxford, Mississippi.

== Early life ==
William Thad Cochran was born on December 7, 1937, in Pontotoc, Mississippi, the son of Emma Grace (née Berry) and William Holmes Cochran, a teacher and school principal, respectively. His family settled in Hinds County, Mississippi, home of the state capital, Jackson, in 1946 after a few moves around the northern part of the state. He graduated valedictorian from Byram High School near Jackson.

Cochran then received a Bachelor of Arts degree from the University of Mississippi with a major in psychology and a minor in political science in 1959. There he joined the Pi Kappa Alpha fraternity and was on the cheerleading squad (fellow senator Trent Lott was also an Ole Miss cheerleader). He was elected to the Phi Kappa Phi honor society, and worked as a lifeguard at Livingston Lake in Jackson during the summers.

After a time in the United States Navy (1959–1961), where he was commissioned an ensign aboard the USS Macon, Cochran received a Juris Doctor from the University of Mississippi School of Law in 1965. While in law school, he won the Frederick Hamel Memorial Award for having the highest scholastic average in the first year class and served on the editorial board of the Mississippi Law Journal. Following graduation, Cochran practiced law at the firm of Watkins & Eager in Jackson, Mississippi, where he was promoted to partner.

In 1968, Lamar Alexander recruited Cochran to serve as chairman of Citizens for Nixon-Agnew in Mississippi.

== U.S. House of Representatives ==
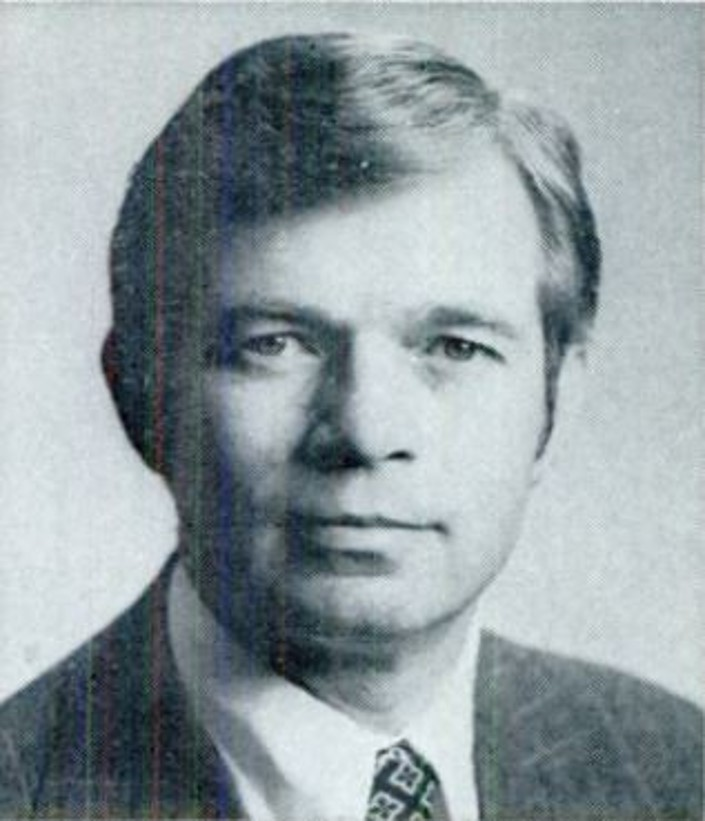
Cochran during his time in the House of Representatives

In 1972, Jackson lawyer Mike Allred and oilman Billy Mounger, both Republicans, recruited Cochran to run for Congress as a Republican. That year, Democratic Congressman Charles H. Griffin of Mississippi's 3rd congressional district decided not to run for a third full term. Cochran won the Republican nomination for the Jackson-based district, which was renumbered as the 4th District after redistricting. He defeated Democratic state senator Ellis B. Bodron by 47.9% to 44%. One factor in Cochran's victory was Richard Nixon's strong showing in that year's presidential election. Mississippi was Nixon's best state in 1972, taking 78.2 percent of the statewide popular vote. Another Republican candidate that year, Gil Carmichael, who ran for U.S. Senate against James Eastland, only finished with 38 percent of the vote, largely because of Nixon steadfastly backing Eastland. Another factor for Cochran's win was black turnout. Eddie McBride, a black independent candidate, pulled enough black voters from Bodron to help sway the election. McBride had been recruited by Fayette Mayor Charles Evers to retaliate against Bodron, who had blocked Evers' initiative to build a nursing home in Fayette. Cochran, alongside Trent Lott, became the second and third Republicans to be elected to represent Mississippi in the House of Representatives since Reconstruction. (Note: Prentiss Walker was the first in 1964.)

In the 1974 elections, Cochran won in a landslide victory with 70.2 percent of the vote, winning every county besides black-majority Claiborne and Jefferson. He called his victory an endorsement of "my views on cutting down inflation and unnecessary spending." Cochran ran for reelection in the 1976 elections and was predicted to easily win. Cochran easily won reelection with 76% of the vote.

== U.S. Senate ==
=== Elections ===
In 1978, six-term Democratic Senator James Eastland decided to retire. Cochran ran for the seat and won the Republican primary, defeating state senator and former Jones County prosecutor Charles W. Pickering, 69%–31% percent. In the general election, he faced Democrat Maurice Dantin, a former district attorney who had triumphed in a four-way primary with the backing of Eastland, and Independent candidate Charles Evers, the mayor of Fayette. Evers, the first African American to be elected mayor of a Mississippi town since Reconstruction, split the Democratic vote and Cochran won with a plurality, taking 45.3% to Dantin's 31.8% and Evers' 22.6%. This made Cochran the first Republican to win a statewide election in Mississippi in a century and thus became Mississippi's first new U.S. senator since John C. Stennis in 1947. Eastland resigned on 27 December to give Cochran a seniority advantage over other new incoming U.S. senators. Governor Cliff Finch appointed Cochran to serve the remaining week of Eastland's term.

Cochran faced an expected strong challenge for re-election from incumbent Democratic governor William Winter in 1984, but he was re-elected easily, 60.9 to 39.1 percent. He was likely helped by the presence of Ronald Reagan atop the ticket for president; Reagan carried Mississippi by an almost identical margin, 61.8 percent to Walter Mondale's 37.4 percent.

He was completely unopposed in 1990 and took 71 percent of the vote in 1996; the Democratic nominee, retired factory worker Bootie Hunt, received 27.4 percent. No Democrat ran against Cochran in 2002; he faced only Reform Party candidate Shawn O'Hara, beating him by 84.6 to 15.4 percent. Cochran faced his strongest challenger in twenty-four years in 2008 when the Democrats nominated State Representative Erik R. Fleming. In a year that saw widespread Democratic gains, Cochran was still re-elected, 61.4–37.6 percent.

==== 2014 election ====
In 2014, Cochran faced a primary challenge from Tea Party-supported candidate Chris McDaniel. Although the primary was initially considered uncompetitive, McDaniel proved a serious challenger. Polling showed the lead swinging between the two and it eventually became a "50%-50% race".

The primary was considered a marquee establishment-versus-Tea Party fight. Cochran's seniority and appropriating skills contrasted with the junior status of the rest of the state's congressional delegation. The primary was described as "nasty" and full of "bizarre" twists.

In May 2014, a scandal emerged when a McDaniel supporter allegedly entered a nursing home where Cochran's bedridden wife was living and took pictures of her. The images were posted to a blog, intending to advance the rumor that Cochran was having affairs while his wife was receiving care. Four people were arrested in connection with the incident. The connection to the McDaniel campaign was disputed. One of the arrested included McDaniel ally Mark Mayfield, who was vice chairman of the state's Tea Party. In response, McDaniel said, "the violation of the privacy of Mrs. Cochran [was] out of bounds for politics and reprehensible."

Neither candidate won a majority in the primary election; McDaniel won 49.46% of the vote, while Cochran received 49.02%. A runoff election between McDaniel and Cochran was held on June 24. Despite trailing in most of the polls, Cochran won with 51.01% of the vote to McDaniel's 48.99%. The Cochran campaign denied allegations of vote-buying made by a blogger regarding his run-off victory. In the aftermath of the runoff, the McDaniel campaign claimed there were indications of voter fraud. McDaniel's legal challenge to the election results failed.

On Election Day, Cochran defeated Democratic former U.S. Rep. Travis Childers, 59.90%-37.89%.

=== Tenure ===
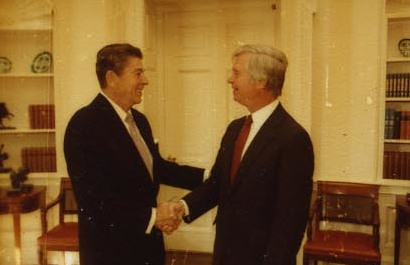
Cochran with President Ronald Reagan in 1981

Generally, Cochran kept a lower national profile than conventional wisdom would suggest for someone who spent almost half a century in Washington, including seven terms in the Senate. However, he had considerable influence behind the scenes, especially in Mississippi.

In March 1981, after the Senate Agriculture Committee overwhelmingly approved a proposal to enact a temporary freeze on the level of dairy price supports and thereby gave President Ronald Reagan his first congressional victory for his federal spending reductions, Cochran stated that the vote was "a great victory for" Reagan and "a very important first step in having his program adopted by Congress."

In April 1981, along with Bob Packwood, Daniel Patrick Moynihan, John Heinz, David Pryor, Spark M. Matsunaga, Donald W. Riegle Jr., and Bill Bradley, Cochran was one of eight senators to cosponsor a bipartisan six-year experiment in care at home for the elderly and disabled for the purpose of presenting an alternative to expensive hospitals and nursing facilities.

Cochran served as Vice Chairman of the Senate Republican Conference from 1985 to 1991 and as Chairman from 1991 to 1996. He chaired the Senate Agriculture Committee from 2003 to 2005. In 2005, he was appointed as chairman of the powerful Senate Appropriations Committee, making him the first Republican from a former Confederate state to chair the committee. While Chairman of the Senate Appropriations Committee, Cochran worked to expedite the process of approving spending bills to minimize partisan skirmishing.

In June 1991, Cochran introduced legislation to establish a commission of three members appointed by the president to oversee recognition of Indian tribes and speed the tribal recognition process. Cochran said he was "supportive of trying to establish a procedure that would permit these matters to be resolved by a commission" and that it was a better alternative to seeking to "call on Congress to make decisions we're really not qualified to make."

In June 1996, Cochran ran for the post of Senate Majority Leader to succeed Republican Bob Dole, who had resigned from the Senate to concentrate on his presidential campaign. Cochran faced his Mississippi colleague Trent Lott, the then-Senate Majority Whip. Cochran cast himself as an "institutionalist" and who would held to rebuild public trust in Congress through compromise over conflict. Lott promised a "more aggressive" style of leadership and courted the younger Senate conservatives. Cochran lost by 44 votes to 8.

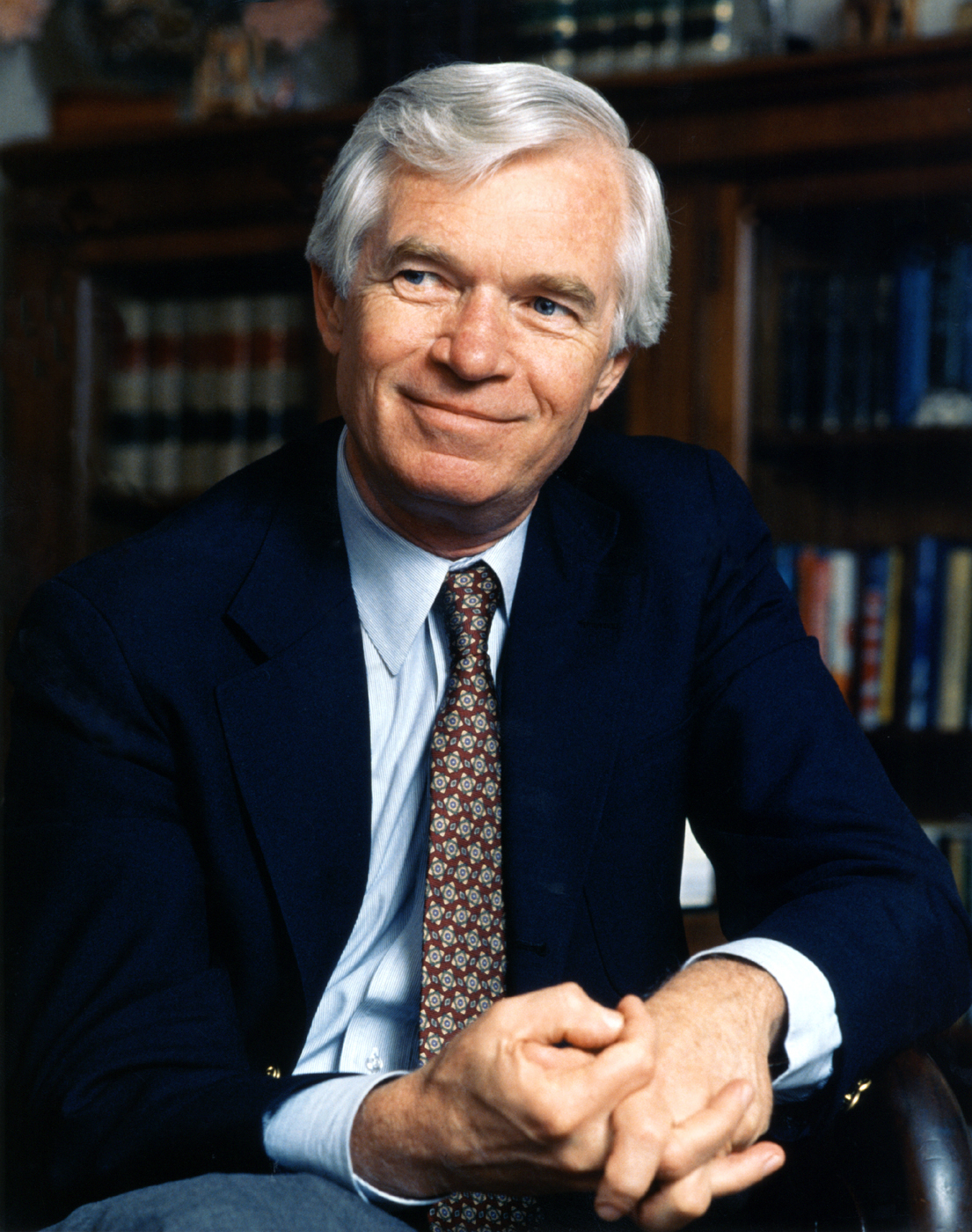
Cochran in the 90s

On June 13, 2005, the U.S. Senate formally apologized for its failure to enact a federal anti-lynching law in the early 20th century, "when it was most needed". The resolution was passed on a voice vote with 80 senators cosponsoring. Cochran and fellow Mississippian Trent Lott were among the 20 senators who did not join as cosponsors. Cochran said, "I'm not in the business of apologizing for what someone else did or didn't do. I deplore and regret that lynching occurred and that those committing them weren't punished, but I'm not culpable".

In April 2006, Cochran was selected by Time as one of "America's 10 Best Senators". He was dubbed "The Quiet Persuader" for his role in winning money for the Gulf Coast in the wake of Hurricane Katrina. Time reported that Cochran managed to wring "$29 billion out of his colleagues, almost double the money [President George W.] Bush and congressional leaders had initially pledged". Earlier, Cochran threatened to derail a defense appropriations bill unless it included funding for installations on the Gulf Coast. The article also noted that Cochran has "gained the trust of the [Bush] Administration and Capitol Hill for his quiet, courtly manner... using his experience and mastery of the issues to persuade his colleagues privately rather than making demands on them in public". The magazine quoted an unnamed "senior GOP Senator" who said "He doesn't get a whole lot of play in terms of coverage, but he is effectively stubborn doing what needs to be done."

In late 2017, questions began to arise over Cochran's apparently deteriorating health. He missed two weeks of the Senate session due to a urological procedure. Upon his return to Washington, Cochran needed assistance locating the Senate chamber and was described by Politico as "frail" and "disoriented". On one occasion, he repeatedly voted "yes" despite being told by aides to vote "no"; he later realized his mistake and changed his vote. However, Cochran sought to defuse rumors that his retirement was imminent, saying, "Don’t believe everything you hear".

On March 5, 2018, Cochran announced that he would retire from the Senate due to ongoing health challenges. Cochran left office on April 1, 2018. He was one of the longest-serving members of Congress in history.

=== Positions ===
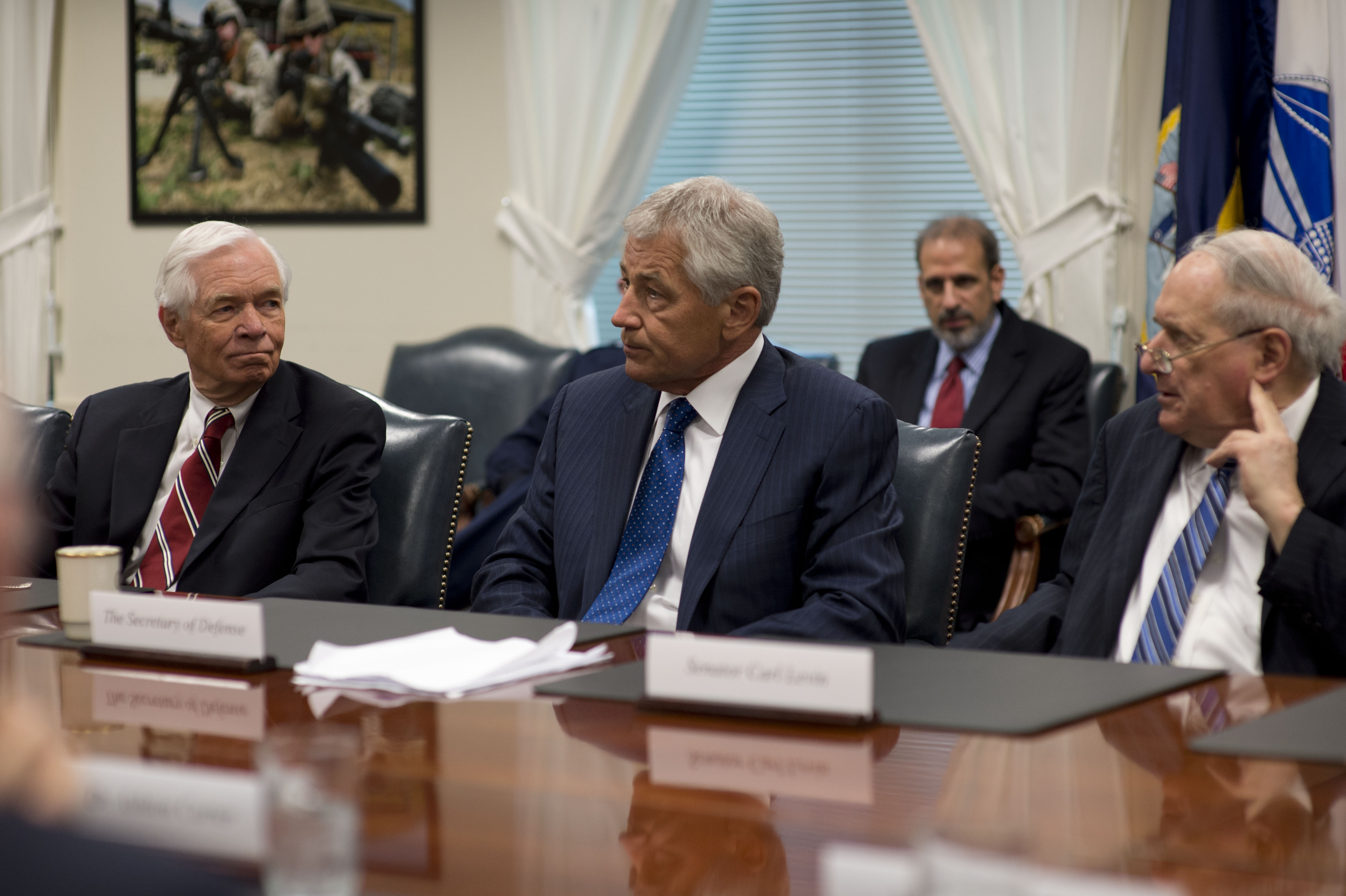
Senators Cochran (left) and Carl Levin (right) meet with Secretary of Defense Chuck Hagel at the Pentagon to discuss the budgeting, April 10, 2013.

Cochran was considered to be more moderate than his Republican colleagues. In 2017, The New York Times arranged Republican senators based on ideology and reported that Cochran was the fourth most moderate Republican in their findings. According to GovTrack, Cochran was more moderate than most of his Republican colleagues being to the left of most but to the right of several others. The non-partisan National Journal gave Senator Cochran a composite ideology score of 68% conservative and 33% liberal.

In 2005, he was one of nine senators who voted against the Detainee Treatment Act of 2005, which prohibited "inhumane treatment of prisoners, including prisoners at Guantanamo Bay". The others, all Republicans, were Wayne Allard, Kit Bond, Tom Coburn, Jeff Sessions, Jim Inhofe, Pat Roberts, John Cornyn and Ted Stevens.

On July 18, 2006, Cochran voted, along with 19 Republican senators, for the Stem Cell Research Enhancement Act to lift restrictions on federal funding for the research.

In April 2010, it was reported that Cochran finished at the top of the Citizens Against Government Waste's list of congressional earmarks, having requested a total of $490 million in earmarks.

In 2012, Cochran encouraged Mississippians to prepare for the effects of Tropical Storm Isaac, saying "Taking steps now to protect people and property should help lessen the losses that might be associated with Isaac. It is important that everyone stay informed and follow emergency orders. I am confident that Mississippians have learned valuable lessons from previous storms and will work together to prepare for this newest threat, I believe Governor Bryant and others are handling emergency preparedness actions very well."

==== Environment ====
In 2017, Cochran was one of 22 senators to sign a letter to President Donald Trump urging the President to have the United States withdraw from the Paris Agreement. According to OpenSecrets, Cochran had received more than $290,000 from oil, gas and coal interests since 2012.

==== Gun law ====
Cochran had an A+ rating from the NRA Political Victory Fund (NRA-PVF) due to his consistent voting and support of pro-gun legislation. The NRA endorsed Cochran in the 2014 election.

In April 2013, Cochran was one of forty-six senators to vote against the passing of a bill which would have expanded background checks for gun buyers. Cochran voted with 40 Republicans and 5 Democrats to stop the passage of the bill.

Cochran voted to repeal a regulation that made it illegal for certain individuals with specific mental health diagnosis to purchase guns. The original law authorizing such regulation was passed with a unanimous vote in 2007 after the Virginia Tech shooting. Cochran claims the law infringed upon the Second Amendment rights of disabled people.

==== Healthcare ====
Cochran opposed President Barack Obama's health reform legislation; he voted against the Patient Protection and Affordable Care Act in December 2009, and he voted against the Health Care and Education Reconciliation Act of 2010.

==== Jefferson Davis ====
As senior senator of the state of Mississippi, Cochran was given the opportunity to use the desk of Jefferson Davis, the president of the Confederacy, which Cochran accepted. Cochran said that he was "very proud" to have Davis's desk. Cochran opposed attempts to remove a statue of Davis from the U.S. Capitol.

==== Martin Luther King Jr. Day ====
In 1983, President Ronald Reagan signed into law: H.R. 3706 (98th) – A bill to amend title 5, United States Code, to make the birthday of Martin Luther King Jr., a legal public holiday. Cochran, a Republican, voted for the act. His colleague in the Senate from Mississippi, Democrat John C. Stennis, voted against the act.

==== Trade ====
In January 2018, Cochran was one of thirty-six Republican senators to sign a letter to President Trump requesting he preserve the North American Free Trade Agreement by modernizing it for the economy of the 21st century.

=== Staff ===
- Mississippi State University president Mark Keenum served as Cochran's chief-of-staff.
- Delta State University president William LaForge served as Cochran's chief-of-staff.
- In 1973, Cochran hired Nehemiah Flowers Jr. from WLBT, where he was Mississippi's first black television executive. Flowers was the first African-American congressional staffer in Mississippi since Reconstruction. Flowers remained on Cochran's staff until 2002, when Cochran recommended him and President George W. Bush nominated him to become U.S. Marshal for Mississippi's Southern District. He remained in that position until 2010.
- AT&T Mississippi president R. Mayo Flint III formerly served on Cochran's staff.

=== Sponsored legislation ===
- The Natchez Trace Parkway Land Conveyance Act of 2013 (S. 304; 113th Congress) (S. 304) is a bill that was sponsored and actively lobbied for by Thad Cochran during the 113th United States Congress. The bill would require the National Park Service (NPS) to convey about 67 acres of property in the Natchez Trace Parkway to the state of Mississippi. The legislation also would adjust the boundaries of the parkway to include 10 additional acres. The two pieces of land in question originally belonged to Mississippi, and were donated to the National Park Service when the NPS was trying to determine where to end the Natchez Trace Parkway. Since the NPS did not choose to use either of the pieces of land, the state would like the land back.
- The Bipartisan Sportsmen's Act of 2014 (S. 2363; 113th Congress), a bill related to hunting, fishing, and outdoor recreation in the United States, aimed at improving "the public's ability to enjoy the outdoors." Cochran supported the bill, arguing that the bill "deserves broad support for its policies and reforms that will protect and enhance opportunities to hunt, fish and enjoy the outdoors."
- Cochran was the lead sponsor of "The Cochran-Inouye National Missile Defense Act of 1999." The policy sought to counter emerging missile threats from China, North Korea, Iran, and Iraq. The policy was enacted into law on July 22, 1999, as incorporated into a House version of the bill. The act stated:
  It is the policy of the United States to deploy as soon as is technologically possible an effective National Missile Defense system capable of defending the territory of the United States against limited ballistic missile attack (whether accidental, unauthorized, or deliberate) with funding subject to the annual authorization of appropriations and the annual appropriation of funds for National Missile Defense.

=== Committee assignments ===
- Committee on Agriculture, Nutrition, and Forestry (chairman)
  - Subcommittee on Commodities, Risk Management and Trade
  - Subcommittee on Conservation, Forestry and Natural Resources
  - Subcommittee on Rural Development and Energy
- Committee on Appropriations (chairman)
  - Subcommittee on Agriculture, Rural Development, Food and Drug Administration, and Related Agencies
  - Subcommittee on Commerce, Justice, Science, and Related Agencies (ex officio)
  - Subcommittee on Defense (chairman)
  - Subcommittee on Energy and Water Development
  - Subcommittee on Financial Services and General Government (ex officio)
  - Subcommittee on Homeland Security
  - Subcommittee on Interior, Environment, and Related Agencies
  - Subcommittee on Labor, Health and Human Services, Education, and Related Agencies
  - Subcommittee on the Legislative Branch (ex officio)
  - Subcommittee on Military Construction, Veterans Affairs, and Related Agencies (ex officio)
  - Subcommittee on State, Foreign Operations, and Related Programs (ex officio)
  - Subcommittee on Transportation, Housing and Urban Development, and Related Agencies (ex officio)
- Committee on Rules and Administration

=== Caucus memberships ===
- House/Senate International Education Study Group (Co-Chair)
- International Conservation Caucus
- Republican Task Force to Study the Energy Crisis
- Afterschool Caucuses
- Congressional Sportsmen's Caucus

== Personal life and death ==
In 1964, Cochran married Rose Clayton. The couple had two children. Rose Cochran died in 2014.

On May 23, 2015, Cochran married longtime aide Kay Webber in a private ceremony in Gulfport, Mississippi.

Fourteen months after his resignation from the Senate, Cochran died on May 30, 2019, in Oxford, Mississippi. The cause of death was renal failure.

== Legacy ==
The Consolidated Appropriations Act of 2018, which was signed into law on March 23, 2018, named the federal courthouse in Jackson, Mississippi after Cochran. The courthouse-naming provision of the act was included by Senator Patrick Leahy of Vermont, who served as the ranking Democrat on the committee and considered Cochran his closest friend in the Senate. On August 9, 2018, a ceremony was held to recognize the naming of the Thad Cochran United States Courthouse in Jackson, Mississippi.

On May 12, 2018, the University of Mississippi gave Cochran the Mississippi Humanitarian Award, given "to exceptional figures who have played a major role in shaping the state."

In 2018, a report indicated that Cochran's official papers were to be housed in the Modern Political Archives at the University of Mississippi.

In recognition of Cochran's military and civil service, the US Navy posthumously named the Arleigh Burke-class destroyer USS Thad Cochran (DDG-135) after him in 2019.

== Electoral history ==
=== U.S. Senate ===
==== 1978 ====
Mississippi U.S. Senate election, 1978
Party	Candidate	Votes	%	±%
Republican	Thad Cochran	267,302	45.3	
Democratic	Maurice Dantin	187,541	31.8	
Independent	Charles Evers	133,646	22.6	
Independent	Henry Jay Kirksey	1,747	0.3	

==== 1984 ====
Mississippi U.S. Senate election, 1984
Party	Candidate	Votes	%	±%
Republican	Thad Cochran (incumbent)	580,314	60.9	
Democratic	William Winter	371,926	39.1	

==== 1990 ====
Mississippi U.S. Senate election, 1990
Party	Candidate	Votes	%	±%
Republican	Thad Cochran (incumbent)	274,244	100.00	
Majority		274,244	100.00	
Turnout		274,244		

==== 1996 ====
Mississippi U.S. Senate election, 1996
Party	Candidate	Votes	%	±%
Republican	Thad Cochran (incumbent)	624,154	71.0	
Democratic	James W. "Bootie" Hunt	240,647	27.4	
Independent	Ted Weill	13,861	1.6	

==== 2002 ====
Mississippi U.S. Senate election, 2002
Party	Candidate	Votes	%	±%
Republican	Thad Cochran (incumbent)	533,269	84.58	
Reform	Shawn O'Hara	97,226	15.42	
Majority		436,043	69.16	
Turnout		630,495		
Republican hold				

==== 2008 ====
Mississippi U.S. Senate election, 2008
Party	Candidate	Votes	%	±%
Republican	Thad Cochran (incumbent)	766,111	61.44%	−23.2
Democratic	Erik Fleming	480,915	38.56%	n/a
Majority		285,196		
Turnout		1,247,026		
Republican hold		Swing		

==== 2014 ====
Mississippi U.S. Senate Republican primary election, 2014
Party	Candidate	Votes	%	+%
Republican	Chris McDaniel	157,733	49.46%	
Republican	Thad Cochran (incumbent)	156,315	49.02%	
Republican	Thomas Carey	4,854	1.52%	

Mississippi U.S. Senate Republican primary runoff election, 2014
Party	Candidate	Votes	%	+%
Republican	Thad Cochran (incumbent)	194,972	51.01%	
Republican	Chris McDaniel	187,249	48.99%	

Mississippi U.S. Senate election, 2014
Party	Candidate	Votes	%
Republican	Thad Cochran (incumbent)	378,481	59.90
Democratic	Travis Childers	239,439	37.89
Reform	Shawn O'Hara	13,938	2.21
Total votes		631,858	100
Republican hold			

U.S. House of Representatives
Preceded by Sonny Montgomery	Member of the U.S. House of Representatives from Mississippi's 4th congressional district 1973–1978	Succeeded by Jon Hinson
Party political offices
Preceded by Gil Carmichael	Republican nominee for U.S. Senator from Mississippi (Class 2); 1978, 1984, 1990, 1996, 2002, 2008, 2014	Succeeded by Cindy Hyde-Smith
Preceded by Jake Garn	Secretary of the Senate Republican Conference; 1985–1991	Succeeded by Bob Kasten
Preceded by John Chafee	Chair of the Senate Republican Conference; 1991–1997	Succeeded by Connie Mack
U.S. Senate
Preceded by James Eastland	U.S. Senator (Class 2) from Mississippi; 1978–2018; Served alongside: John Stennis, Trent Lott, Roger Wicker	Succeeded by Cindy Hyde-Smith
Preceded by Tom Harkin	Chair of the Senate Agriculture Committee; 2003–2005	Succeeded by Saxby Chambliss
Preceded by Ted Stevens	Chair of the Senate Appropriations Committee; 2005–2007	Succeeded by Robert Byrd
Preceded by Robert Byrd	Ranking Member of the Senate Appropriations Committee; 2007–2013	Succeeded by Richard Shelby
Preceded by Pat Roberts	Ranking Member of the Senate Agriculture Committee; 2013–2015	Succeeded by Debbie Stabenow
Preceded by Barbara Mikulski	Chair of the Senate Appropriations Committee; 2015–2018	Succeeded by Richard Shelby
