= Erik R. Fleming =

American politician (born 1965)

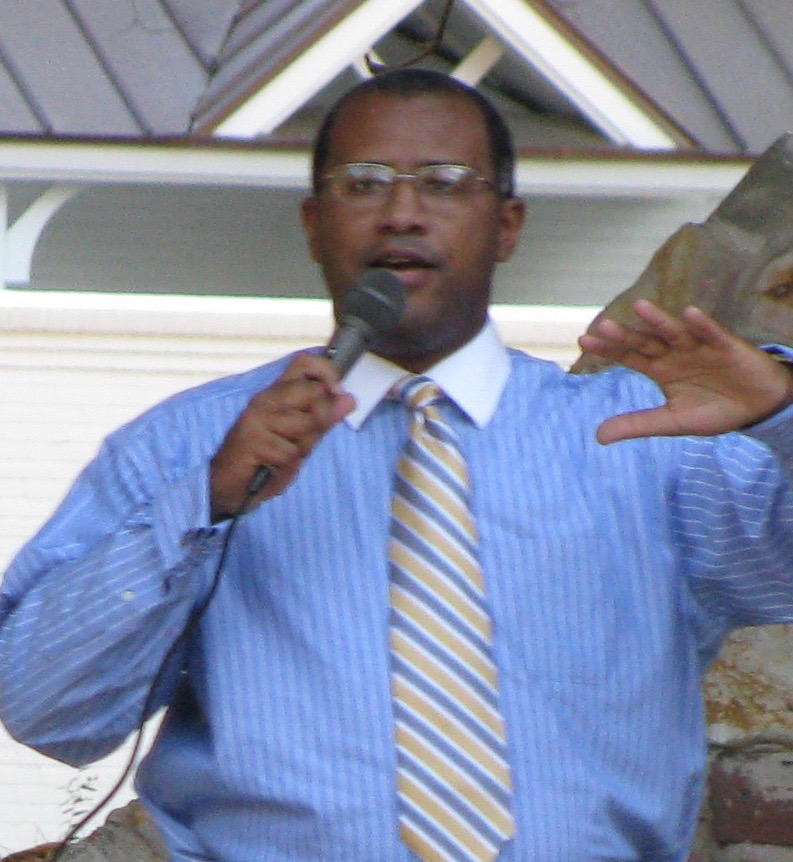

Member of the Mississippi House of Representatives from the 72nd district
- In office 1999–2008
- Preceded by: Tomie Green
- Succeeded by: Kimberly Campbell

Personal details
- Born: Erik Robert Fleming; February 2, 1965 (age 61) Chicago, Illinois, U.S.
- Party: Democratic
- Education: Jackson State University (BA)

Erik Robert Fleming (born February 2, 1965) is an American politician who was a member of the Mississippi House of Representatives representing the 72nd District (which includes parts of Hinds and Madison counties) from 1999 to 2008. He has been the Democratic nominee twice for one of the state's two U.S. Senate seats. He faced incumbent Republican Thad Cochran in the November 4, 2008 general election, and was defeated. Erik was the Director of Policy with the Mississippi chapter of the American Civil Liberties Union (ACLU). He now resides in the metro Atlanta area and continues to advocate for African American issues as the host of the podcast, A Moment with Erik Fleming.

== Early and personal life ==
Fleming was born in Chicago, Illinois to Joan and Robert Fleming, and attended Lindblom Technical High School. He majored in political science at Jackson State University, became a brother of Alpha Phi Omega while there, and graduated in 1987. Fleming worked with Mississippi Governor Ray Mabus in his 1987 campaign and Mike Parker in his campaign for the U.S. Congress in 1988.

Fleming is married to City of South Fulton, GA Councilwoman Linda Pritchett. He is the father of one son, Sean Christopher, and is a Christian. Erik has been a member of several organizations and boards, including the NAACP, the SCLC, the Mississippi Faith-Based Coalition for Community Renewal, the Mississippi Families for Kids, and the Jackson State University National Alumni Association.

== Political career ==
Fleming was first elected to the Mississippi House of Representatives in a January 1999 special election to finish the unexpired term of Tomie Green. He represented the 72nd District (which includes parts of Hinds and Madison counties) from 1999 to 2008. He was defeated in the 2007 primary by Kimberly Campbell, who succeeded him in January 2008.

Fleming ran against incumbent U.S. Senator Trent Lott in the November 2006 election. There were four candidates In the June 6, 2006 Democratic primary; top two finishers were Fleming, who received 44 percent, and Hickory Flat business consultant Bill Bowlin, who received 22 percent. In the June 27 runoff between Fleming and Bowlin, Fleming received 65 percent. Fleming lost to Lott in the general election.

Fleming served as President of the Young Democrats of Mississippi (1991–1992), Chair of the Hinds County Democratic Executive Committee (1996–1999), National Committeeman of The Young Democrats of America (1993–1995), and as campaign manager for the Henry J. Kirksey for Mayor Campaign (1993).

At one time Fleming expressed support for political activist Lyndon LaRouche, but has denounced him several times since.

Fleming worked previously as a paralegal for the Mississippi Immigrants Rights Alliance, an abstinence educator with the Mississippi Community Development Corporation, a non-profit agency located in his legislative district. Fleming has also served as chief operating officer for New Horizon Ministries, Inc., a non-profit agency in Jackson.

Fleming won the Mississippi primary for the Democratic Party nomination and then went on and faced Senator Thad Cochran in Mississippi's November 2008 Senate election. Senator Cochran won by a landslide with over 61% of the vote and Fleming got only 39% of the vote.

== See also ==
- 2006 United States Senate election in Mississippi
- 2008 United States Senate election in Mississippi
- List of African-American United States Senate candidates

Party political offices
Preceded by Troy Brown	Democratic nominee for U.S. Senator from Mississippi (Class 1); 2006	Succeeded by Ronnie Musgrove
Vacant Title last held by Bootie Hunt; 1996	Democratic nominee for U.S. Senator from Mississippi (Class 2); 2008	Succeeded by Travis Childers
