= 1990 United States Senate election in Mississippi =

- November 6, 1990
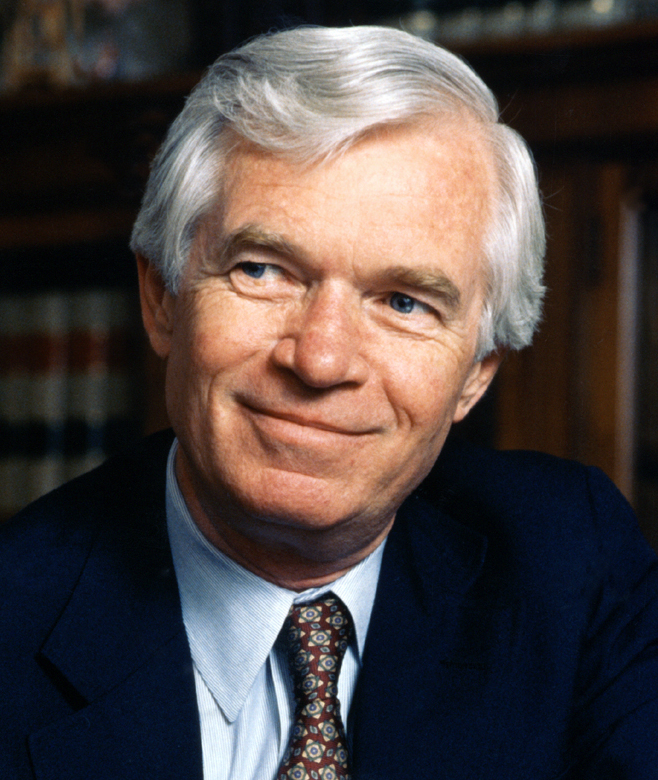
Nominee	Thad Cochran
Party	Republican
Popular vote	274,244
Percentage	100.00%
- County results Cochran: >90% No votes cast or no data
U.S. senator before election
Thad Cochran
Republican
Elected U.S. Senator
Thad Cochran
Republican

The 1990 United States Senate election in Mississippi was held on November 6, 1990. Incumbent Republican U.S. Senator Thad Cochran won ran for a third term. The Democratic Party did not field a candidate for this election, leaving Cochran to be elected to a third term unopposed.

== Candidates ==
=== Republican ===
- Thad Cochran, incumbent U.S. Senator

== Results ==
Mississippi United States Senate election, 1990
Party	Candidate	Votes	%
Republican	Thad Cochran (incumbent)	274,244	100.00%
Majority		274,244	100.00%
Turnout		274,244	
Republican hold			

== See also ==
- 1990 United States Senate elections
