= USS Thad Cochran =

Guided missile destroyer

History

United States
- Name: Thad Cochran
- Namesake: Thad Cochran
- Awarded: 27 September 2018
- Builder: Ingalls Shipbuilding
- Laid down: October 23, 2025
- Identification: Hull number: DDG-135
- Status: Under construction

General characteristics
- Class & type: Arleigh Burke-class destroyer
- Displacement: 9,217 tons (full load)
- Length: 510 ft (160 m)
- Beam: 66 ft (20 m)
- Propulsion: 4 × General Electric LM2500 gas turbines 100,000 shp (75,000 kW)
- Speed: 31 knots (57 km/h; 36 mph)
- Complement: 380 officers and enlisted
- Armament: Guns: 1 × 5-inch (127 mm)/62 Mk 45 Mod 4 (lightweight gun); 1 × 20 mm (0.8 in) Phalanx CIWS; 2 × 25 mm (0.98 in) Mk 38 machine gun system; 4 × 0.50 in (12.7 mm) caliber guns; Missiles: 1 × 32-cell, 1 × 64-cell (96 total cells) Mk 41 vertical launching system (VLS): RIM-66M surface-to-air missile; RIM-156 surface-to-air missile; RIM-174A Standard ERAM; RIM-161 anti-ballistic missile; RIM-162 ESSM (quad-packed); BGM-109 Tomahawk cruise missile; RUM-139 vertical launch ASROC; Torpedoes: 2 × Mark 32 triple torpedo tubes: Mark 46 lightweight torpedo; Mark 50 lightweight torpedo; Mark 54 lightweight torpedo
- Armor: Kevlar-type armor with steel hull. Numerous passive survivability measures.
- Aircraft carried: 2 × MH-60R Seahawk helicopters
- Aviation facilities: Double hangar and helipad

USS Thad Cochran (DDG-135) is a planned Arleigh Burke-class (Flight III) Aegis guided missile destroyer of the United States Navy. She will be named in honor of William Thad Cochran, a Republican U.S. Senator representing Mississippi from 1978 to 2018, serving on numerous subcommittees during that time. He was a U.S. Navy ensign during 1959–1961. Fabrication of the ship began on 13 November 2023.
