= 2002 United States Senate election in Mississippi =

- November 5, 2002
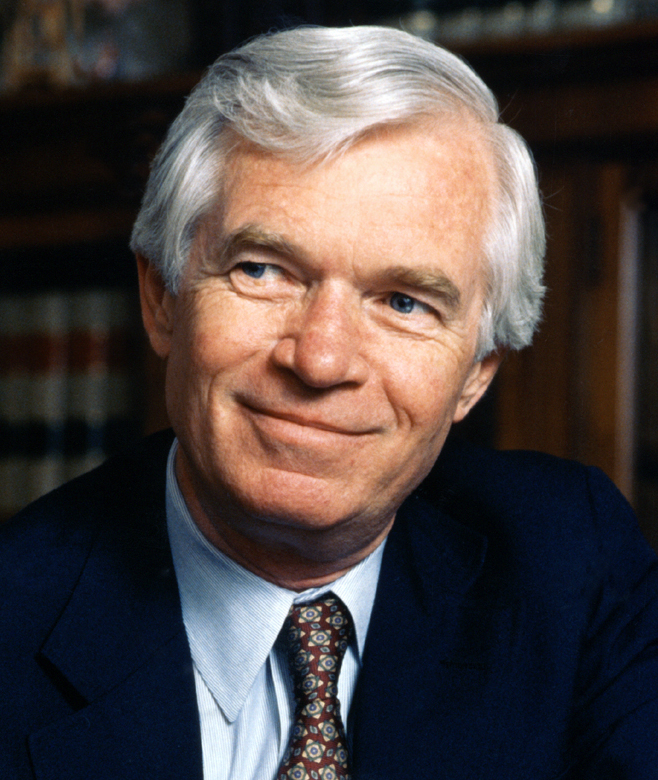

Nominee	Thad Cochran	Shawn O'Hara
Party	Republican	Reform
Popular vote	533,269	97,226
Percentage	84.58%	15.42%
- County results Cochran: 60–70% 70–80% 80–90% >90%
U.S. senator before election
Thad Cochran
Republican
Elected U.S. Senator
Thad Cochran
Republican

The 2002 United States Senate election in Mississippi was held on November 5, 2002. Incumbent Republican U.S. Senator Thad Cochran overwhelmingly won re-election to a fifth term. The Democratic Party did not field a candidate, resulting in Reform Party candidate Shawn O'Hara winning 15.42%. O'Hara's percentage of the vote was more than double Ross Perot's statewide total of 5.84% in the 1996 presidential election. His percentage was also the highest percentage for a Reform candidate in a U.S. Senate election.

== Major candidates ==
=== Reform ===
- Shawn O'Hara, perennial candidate

=== Republican ===
- Thad Cochran, incumbent U.S. senator

== General election ==
=== Predictions ===
Source	Ranking	As of
Sabato's Crystal Ball	Safe R	November 4, 2002

=== Results ===
2002 United States Senate election in Mississippi
Party	Candidate	Votes	%
Republican	Thad Cochran (incumbent)	533,269	84.58%
Reform	Shawn O'Hara	97,226	15.42%
Total votes		630,495	100.00%
Republican hold			

==== By county ====
County	Thad Cochran Republican		Shawn O'Hara Reform		Margin		Total
County	#	%	#	%	#	%	Total
Adams	6,621	76.41%	2,044	23.59%	4,577	52.82%	8,665
Alcorn	3,284	88.52%	426	11.48%	2,858	77.04%	3,710
Amite	3,811	65.87%	1,975	34.13%	1,836	31.73%	5,786
Attala	4,810	85.07%	844	14.93%	3,966	70.15%	5,654
Benton	1,272	81.07%	297	18.93%	975	62.14%	1,569
Bolivar	5,660	83.27%	1,137	16.73%	4,523	66.54%	6,797
Calhoun	2,614	86.33%	414	13.67%	2,200	72.66%	3,028
Carroll	2,215	83.43%	440	16.57%	1,775	66.85%	2,655
Chickasaw	3,299	79.67%	842	20.33%	2,457	59.33%	4,141
Choctaw	1,698	87.26%	248	12.74%	1,450	74.51%	1,946
Claiborne	1,386	64.32%	769	35.68%	617	28.63%	2,155
Clarke	3,755	83.37%	749	16.63%	3,006	66.74%	4,504
Clay	4,356	72.05%	1,690	27.95%	2,666	44.10%	6,046
Coahoma	3,036	89.24%	366	10.76%	2,670	78.48%	3,402
Copiah	5,315	79.25%	1,392	20.75%	3,923	58.49%	6,707
Covington	4,685	84.07%	888	15.93%	3,797	68.13%	5,573
DeSoto	10,431	88.55%	1,349	11.45%	9,082	77.10%	11,780
Forrest	13,771	87.99%	1,880	12.01%	11,891	75.98%	15,651
Franklin	2,475	84.04%	470	15.96%	2,005	68.08%	2,945
George	3,717	90.15%	406	9.85%	3,311	80.31%	4,123
Greene	2,256	89.21%	273	10.79%	1,983	78.41%	2,529
Grenada	4,675	83.98%	892	16.02%	3,783	67.95%	5,567
Hancock	7,034	85.84%	1,160	14.16%	5,874	71.69%	8,194
Harrison	35,954	86.08%	5,816	13.92%	30,138	72.15%	41,770
Hinds	46,687	82.16%	10,138	17.84%	36,549	64.32%	56,825
Holmes	2,732	67.98%	1,287	32.02%	1,445	35.95%	4,019
Humphreys	1,797	73.53%	647	26.47%	1,150	47.05%	2,444
Issaquena	422	77.86%	120	22.14%	302	55.72%	542
Itawamba	4,424	86.66%	681	13.34%	3,743	73.32%	5,105
Jackson	25,305	89.22%	3,056	10.78%	22,249	78.45%	28,361
Jasper	3,564	75.48%	1,158	24.52%	2,406	50.95%	4,722
Jefferson	1,225	63.14%	715	36.86%	510	26.29%	1,940
Jefferson Davis	2,964	77.07%	882	22.93%	2,082	54.13%	3,846
Jones	13,463	88.49%	1,751	11.51%	11,712	76.98%	15,214
Kemper	2,701	83.29%	542	16.71%	2,159	66.57%	3,243
Lafayette	5,605	85.53%	948	14.47%	4,657	71.07%	6,553
Lamar	10,069	92.79%	782	7.21%	9,287	85.59%	10,851
Lauderdale	17,398	88.78%	2,198	11.22%	15,200	77.57%	19,596
Lawrence	4,186	83.29%	840	16.71%	3,346	66.57%	5,026
Leake	4,326	84.81%	775	15.19%	3,551	69.61%	5,101
Lee	12,585	88.76%	1,594	11.24%	10,991	77.52%	14,179
Leflore	4,553	79.17%	1,198	20.83%	3,355	58.34%	5,751
Lincoln	8,708	86.32%	1,380	13.68%	7,328	72.64%	10,088
Lowndes	10,268	84.14%	1,936	15.86%	8,332	68.27%	12,204
Madison	20,109	87.86%	2,779	12.14%	17,330	75.72%	22,888
Marion	5,988	86.41%	942	13.59%	5,046	72.81%	6,930
Marshall	4,068	77.83%	1,159	22.17%	2,909	55.65%	5,227
Monroe	5,204	82.29%	1,120	17.71%	4,084	64.58%	6,324
Montgomery	2,813	87.80%	391	12.20%	2,422	75.59%	3,204
Neshoba	6,864	90.57%	715	9.43%	6,149	81.13%	7,579
Newton	5,491	91.20%	530	8.80%	4,961	82.39%	6,021
Noxubee	2,194	70.25%	929	29.75%	1,265	40.51%	3,123
Oktibbeha	7,793	79.67%	1,988	20.33%	5,805	59.35%	9,781
Panola	5,058	79.74%	1,285	20.26%	3,773	59.48%	6,343
Pearl River	7,212	87.49%	1,031	12.51%	6,181	74.98%	8,243
Perry	2,695	88.51%	350	11.49%	2,345	77.01%	3,045
Pike	8,776	78.33%	2,428	21.67%	6,348	56.66%	11,204
Pontotoc	4,530	89.53%	530	10.47%	4,000	79.05%	5,060
Prentiss	4,951	87.54%	705	12.46%	4,246	75.07%	5,656
Quitman	1,088	73.07%	401	26.93%	687	46.14%	1,489
Rankin	31,180	93.02%	2,341	6.98%	28,839	86.03%	33,521
Scott	5,501	83.82%	1,062	16.18%	4,439	67.64%	6,563
Sharkey	1,233	78.74%	333	21.26%	900	57.47%	1,566
Simpson	5,823	81.77%	1,298	18.23%	4,525	63.54%	7,121
Smith	5,075	91.66%	462	8.34%	4,613	83.31%	5,537
Stone	3,132	89.77%	357	10.23%	2,775	79.54%	3,489
Sunflower	3,479	73.72%	1,240	26.28%	2,239	47.45%	4,719
Tallahatchie	2,261	74.67%	767	25.33%	1,494	49.34%	3,028
Tate	3,363	85.05%	591	14.95%	2,772	70.11%	3,954
Tippah	3,646	86.01%	593	13.99%	3,053	72.02%	4,239
Tishomingo	3,344	82.94%	688	17.06%	2,656	65.87%	4,032
Tunica	551	68.11%	258	31.89%	293	36.22%	809
Union	4,672	90.79%	474	9.21%	4,198	81.58%	5,146
Walthall	3,530	81.17%	819	18.83%	2,711	62.34%	4,349
Warren	11,036	86.76%	1,684	13.24%	9,352	73.52%	12,720
Washington	8,263	75.57%	2,671	24.43%	5,592	51.14%	10,934
Wayne	4,384	83.79%	848	16.21%	3,536	67.58%	5,232
Webster	2,829	88.99%	350	11.01%	2,479	77.98%	3,179
Wilkinson	1,403	60.45%	918	39.55%	485	20.90%	2,321
Winston	5,661	82.53%	1,198	17.47%	4,463	65.07%	6,859
Yalobusha	2,205	78.16%	616	21.84%	1,589	56.33%	2,821
Yazoo	4,752	82.90%	980	17.10%	3,772	65.81%	5,732
Totals	533,269	84.58%	97,226	15.42%	436,043	69.16%	630,495

==== Counties that flipped from Reform to Republican ====
- Claiborne (largest municipality: Port Gibson)
- Holmes (largest city: Durant)
- Wilkinson (largest city: Centreville)

County flips: Republican Hold Flip

== See also ==
- 2002 United States Senate elections
