= 2006 United States Senate election in Mississippi =

- November 7, 2006
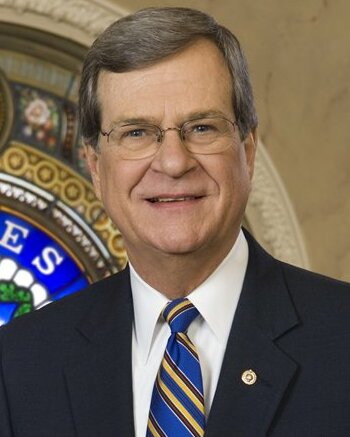

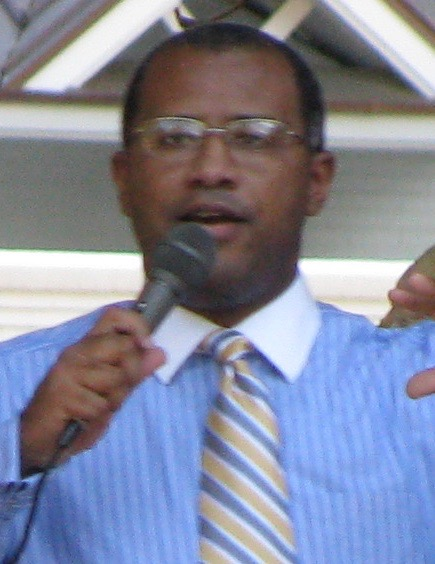
Nominee	Trent Lott	Erik R. Fleming
Party	Republican	Democratic
Popular vote	388,399	213,000
Percentage	63.58%	34.87%
- County results Lott: 40–50% 50–60% 60–70% 70–80% 80–90% Fleming: 40–50% 50–60% 60–70% 70–80%
U.S. senator before election
Trent Lott
Republican
Elected U.S. Senator
Trent Lott
Republican

The 2006 United States Senate election in Mississippi was held November 7, 2006. Incumbent Republican Trent Lott won re-election to a fourth term.

== Democratic primary ==
=== Candidates ===
- Bill Bowlin, business consultant and Republican nominee for MS-01 in 1990
- Erik R. Fleming, State Representative
- James O'Keefe, businessman
- Catherine Starr, activist

=== Results ===
Results by county Map legend: Fleming—60–70%; Fleming—50–60%; Fleming—40–50%; Fleming—30–40%; Fleming—20–30%; Bowlen—70–80%; Bowlen—60–70%; Bowlen—50–60%; Bowlen—40–50%; Bowlen—30–40%; O'Keefe—50–60%; O'Keefe—40–50%; O'Keefe—30–40%; Starr—30–40%; Tie—20–30%

Democratic primary results
Party	Candidate	Votes	%
Democratic	Erik R. Fleming	46,185	44.07
Democratic	Bill Bowlin	23,175	22.11
Democratic	James O'Keefe	20,815	19.86
Democratic	Catherine Starr	14,629	13.96
Total votes		104,804	100

Democratic primary runoff results
Party	Candidate	Votes	%
Democratic	Erik R. Fleming	19,477	64.99
Democratic	Bill Bowlin	10,490	35.01
Total votes		29,967	100

== General election ==
=== Candidates ===
- Erik R. Fleming (D), State Representative
- Trent Lott (R), incumbent U.S. Senator
- Harold Taylor (L)

=== Campaign ===
Lott ran for re-election without facing any opposition in his party's primary. While it had been speculated that Lott might retire after his home was destroyed in Hurricane Katrina, he instead chose to run for re-election. Fleming is an African American, which represents 37% of the state's population. However, no African American has ever been elected to statewide office. The last black U.S. Senator was Hiram Revels, who was appointed and took office in 1870. Fleming got little help from the DSCC, which only donated $15,000 to his campaign.

=== Predictions ===
Source	Ranking	As of
The Cook Political Report	Solid R	November 6, 2006
Sabato's Crystal Ball	Safe R	November 6, 2006
Rothenberg Political Report	Safe R	November 6, 2006
Real Clear Politics	Safe R	November 6, 2006

=== Endorsements ===
Trent Lott (R)

Newspapers

- The Clarion-Ledger

=== Results ===
2006 United States Senate election in Mississippi
Party	Candidate	Votes	%	±%
Republican	Trent Lott (incumbent)	388,399	63.58	−2.30
Democratic	Erik R. Fleming	213,000	34.87	+3.28
Libertarian	Harold Taylor	9,522	1.56	+0.71
Total votes		610,921	100.00	N/A
Republican hold				

==== By county ====
County	Trent Lott Republican		Erik R. Fleming Democratic		Harold Taylor Libertarian		Margin		Total
County	#	%	#	%	#	%	#	%	Total
Adams	3,512	49.79%	3,470	49.19%	72	1.02%	42	0.60%	7,054
Alcorn	5,240	67.00%	2,417	30.90%	164	2.10%	2,823	36.10%	7,821
Amite	2,625	59.46%	1,705	38.62%	85	1.93%	920	20.84%	4,415
Attala	3,048	62.08%	1,817	37.01%	45	0.92%	1,231	25.07%	4,910
Benton	1,085	51.96%	960	45.98%	43	2.06%	125	5.99%	2,088
Bolivar	3,436	43.83%	4,302	54.87%	102	1.30%	-866	-11.05%	7,840
Calhoun	1,978	67.90%	903	31.00%	32	1.10%	1,075	36.90%	2,913
Carroll	2,421	69.53%	1,022	29.35%	39	1.12%	1,399	40.18%	3,482
Chickasaw	1,947	52.98%	1,678	45.66%	50	1.36%	269	7.32%	3,675
Choctaw	1,517	67.39%	696	30.92%	38	1.69%	821	36.47%	2,251
Claiborne	798	25.81%	2,256	72.96%	38	1.23%	-1,458	-47.15%	3,092
Clarke	2,907	66.75%	1,372	31.50%	76	1.75%	1,535	35.25%	4,355
Clay	3,002	50.94%	2,787	47.29%	104	1.76%	215	3.65%	5,893
Coahoma	2,685	46.94%	2,921	51.07%	114	1.99%	-236	-4.13%	5,720
Copiah	4,654	57.42%	3,342	41.23%	109	1.34%	1,312	16.19%	8,105
Covington	3,264	67.12%	1,510	31.05%	89	1.83%	1,754	36.07%	4,863
DeSoto	14,165	74.63%	4,457	23.48%	359	1.89%	9,708	51.15%	18,981
Forrest	9,752	69.51%	4,031	28.73%	246	1.75%	5,721	40.78%	14,029
Franklin	1,944	68.74%	850	30.06%	34	1.20%	1,094	38.68%	2,828
George	3,076	83.68%	537	14.61%	63	1.71%	2,539	69.07%	3,676
Greene	2,807	79.05%	666	18.76%	78	2.20%	2,141	60.29%	3,551
Grenada	3,498	64.96%	1,816	33.72%	71	1.32%	1,682	31.23%	5,385
Hancock	6,166	80.55%	1,329	17.36%	160	2.09%	4,837	63.19%	7,655
Harrison	20,722	76.06%	6,066	22.26%	457	1.68%	14,656	53.79%	27,245
Hinds	24,478	41.72%	33,343	56.83%	851	1.45%	-8,865	-15.11%	58,672
Holmes	1,400	28.46%	3,405	69.22%	114	2.32%	-2,005	-40.76%	4,919
Humphreys	975	38.03%	1,546	60.30%	43	1.68%	-571	-22.27%	2,564
Issaquena	275	44.72%	334	54.31%	6	0.98%	-59	-9.59%	615
Itawamba	3,265	71.68%	1,217	26.72%	73	1.60%	2,048	44.96%	4,555
Jackson	18,029	79.69%	4,250	18.79%	345	1.52%	13,779	60.90%	22,624
Jasper	1,952	51.60%	1,777	46.97%	54	1.43%	175	4.63%	3,783
Jefferson	682	24.00%	2,117	74.49%	43	1.51%	-1,435	-50.49%	2,842
Jefferson Davis	1,954	48.78%	1,993	49.75%	59	1.47%	-39	-0.97%	4,006
Jones	10,979	75.31%	3,375	23.15%	224	1.54%	7,604	52.16%	14,578
Kemper	1,568	53.50%	1,286	43.88%	77	2.63%	282	9.62%	2,931
Lafayette	4,502	60.79%	2,742	37.02%	162	2.19%	1,760	23.76%	7,406
Lamar	10,346	84.67%	1,694	13.86%	179	1.46%	8,652	70.81%	12,219
Lauderdale	12,275	73.41%	4,205	25.15%	242	1.45%	8,070	48.26%	16,722
Lawrence	2,493	66.00%	1,230	32.57%	54	1.43%	1,263	33.44%	3,777
Leake	2,752	59.26%	1,840	39.62%	52	1.12%	912	19.64%	4,644
Lee	9,063	68.91%	3,859	29.34%	229	1.74%	5,204	39.57%	13,151
Leflore	3,410	51.30%	3,176	47.78%	61	0.92%	234	3.52%	6,647
Lincoln	5,173	71.03%	2,034	27.93%	76	1.04%	3,139	43.10%	7,283
Lowndes	8,800	66.24%	4,338	32.65%	148	1.11%	4,462	33.58%	13,286
Madison	13,544	65.46%	6,895	33.33%	250	1.21%	6,649	32.14%	20,689
Marion	4,661	71.19%	1,773	27.08%	113	1.73%	2,888	44.11%	6,547
Marshall	3,382	44.64%	3,999	52.79%	195	2.57%	-617	-8.14%	7,576
Monroe	4,548	63.19%	2,567	35.67%	82	1.14%	1,981	27.53%	7,197
Montgomery	2,106	61.44%	1,284	37.46%	38	1.11%	822	23.98%	3,428
Neshoba	3,879	78.55%	996	20.17%	63	1.28%	2,883	58.38%	4,938
Newton	3,158	76.63%	920	22.32%	43	1.04%	2,238	54.31%	4,121
Noxubee	1,432	40.65%	2,008	57.00%	83	2.36%	-576	-16.35%	3,523
Oktibbeha	5,234	55.32%	4,092	43.25%	136	1.44%	1,142	12.07%	9,462
Panola	3,747	56.01%	2,858	42.72%	85	1.27%	889	13.29%	6,690
Pearl River	11,318	80.09%	2,525	17.87%	288	2.04%	8,793	62.22%	14,131
Perry	2,093	78.63%	512	19.23%	57	2.14%	1,581	59.39%	2,662
Pike	5,396	58.43%	3,708	40.15%	131	1.42%	1,688	18.28%	9,235
Pontotoc	4,411	78.13%	1,164	20.62%	71	1.26%	3,247	57.51%	5,646
Prentiss	4,168	70.03%	1,676	28.16%	108	1.81%	2,492	41.87%	5,952
Quitman	834	40.56%	1,182	57.49%	40	1.95%	-348	-16.93%	2,056
Rankin	22,456	80.65%	4,927	17.70%	460	1.65%	17,529	62.96%	27,843
Scott	3,035	65.64%	1,547	33.46%	42	0.91%	1,488	32.18%	4,624
Sharkey	707	43.45%	900	55.32%	20	1.23%	-193	-11.86%	1,627
Simpson	4,027	69.38%	1,703	29.34%	74	1.27%	2,324	40.04%	5,804
Smith	3,200	80.46%	720	18.10%	57	1.43%	2,480	62.36%	3,977
Stone	2,492	77.42%	669	20.78%	58	1.80%	1,823	56.63%	3,219
Sunflower	2,514	44.47%	3,073	54.36%	66	1.17%	-559	-9.89%	5,653
Tallahatchie	2,352	53.03%	1,991	44.89%	92	2.07%	361	8.14%	4,435
Tate	3,495	64.16%	1,845	33.87%	107	1.96%	1,650	30.29%	5,447
Tippah	3,625	72.86%	1,255	25.23%	95	1.91%	2,370	47.64%	4,975
Tishomingo	2,636	60.92%	1,598	36.93%	93	2.15%	1,038	23.99%	4,327
Tunica	642	37.50%	1,009	58.94%	61	3.56%	-367	-21.44%	1,712
Union	3,541	73.51%	1,203	24.97%	73	1.52%	2,338	48.54%	4,817
Walthall	2,483	65.26%	1,248	32.80%	74	1.94%	1,235	32.46%	3,805
Warren	7,650	62.68%	4,421	36.22%	134	1.10%	3,229	26.46%	12,205
Washington	4,246	45.07%	5,039	53.49%	136	1.44%	-793	-8.42%	9,421
Wayne	3,192	68.75%	1,393	30.00%	58	1.25%	1,799	38.75%	4,643
Webster	2,186	78.46%	562	20.17%	38	1.36%	1,624	58.29%	2,786
Wilkinson	1,026	37.07%	1,688	60.98%	54	1.95%	-662	-23.92%	2,768
Winston	3,142	62.81%	1,783	35.65%	77	1.54%	1,359	27.17%	5,002
Yalobusha	1,738	58.20%	1,205	40.35%	43	1.44%	533	17.85%	2,986
Yazoo	3,483	58.63%	2,391	40.25%	67	1.13%	1,092	18.38%	5,941
Totals	388,399	63.58%	213,000	34.87%	9,522	1.56%	175,399	28.71%	610,921

==== Counties that flipped from Democratic to Republican ====
- Leflore (Largest city: Greenwood)

==== Counties that flipped from Republican to Democratic ====
- Coahoma (Largest city: Clarksdale)
- Hinds (largest municipality: Jackson)
- Jefferson Davis (Largest city: Prentiss)
- Washington (Largest city: Greenville)

== See also ==
- 2006 United States Senate elections
